= 1946 in France =

- Decades: 1920s; 1930s; 1940s; 1950s; 1960s
- See also: History of France; Timeline of French history; List of years in France

Events from the year 1946 in France.

== Incumbents ==
- Chairman of the Provisional Government (also Prime Minister):
  - until 26 January: Charles de Gaulle
  - 26 January-24 June: Félix Gouin
  - 24 June-28 November: Georges Bidault
  - 28 November-16 December: Vincent Auriol (interim)
  - starting 16 December: Leon Blum

== Events ==
- 16 January – Charles de Gaulle resigns as a head of a French provisional government.
- 20 January – Charles de Gaulle resigns as President of France.
- 6 March – Ho Chi Minh signs an agreement with France which recognizes Vietnam as an autonomous state in the Indochinese Federation and the French Union.
- 19 March – French Guiana, Guadeloupe, Martinique and Réunion become overseas départements of France.
- 7 April – Syria's independence from France is officially recognised.
- 5 May – Constitutional Referendum held and proposed constitution rejected.
- 2 June – Legislative Election held.
- 5 July – The bikini, designed by Louis Réard, is first modeled by Micheline Bernardini at the Piscine Molitor in Paris.
- 13 October – Constitutional Referendum held and constitution approved, creating the French Fourth Republic.
- 10 November – Legislative Election held for the first National Assembly of the Fourth Republic.
- December – Severe winter weather.
- 12 December – Léon Blum founds a government of socialist parties in France.
- 16 December – Luxury brand Christian Dior is established in Paris by designer Christian Dior.
- 24 December – French Fourth Republic founded.

== Births ==
=== January to June ===
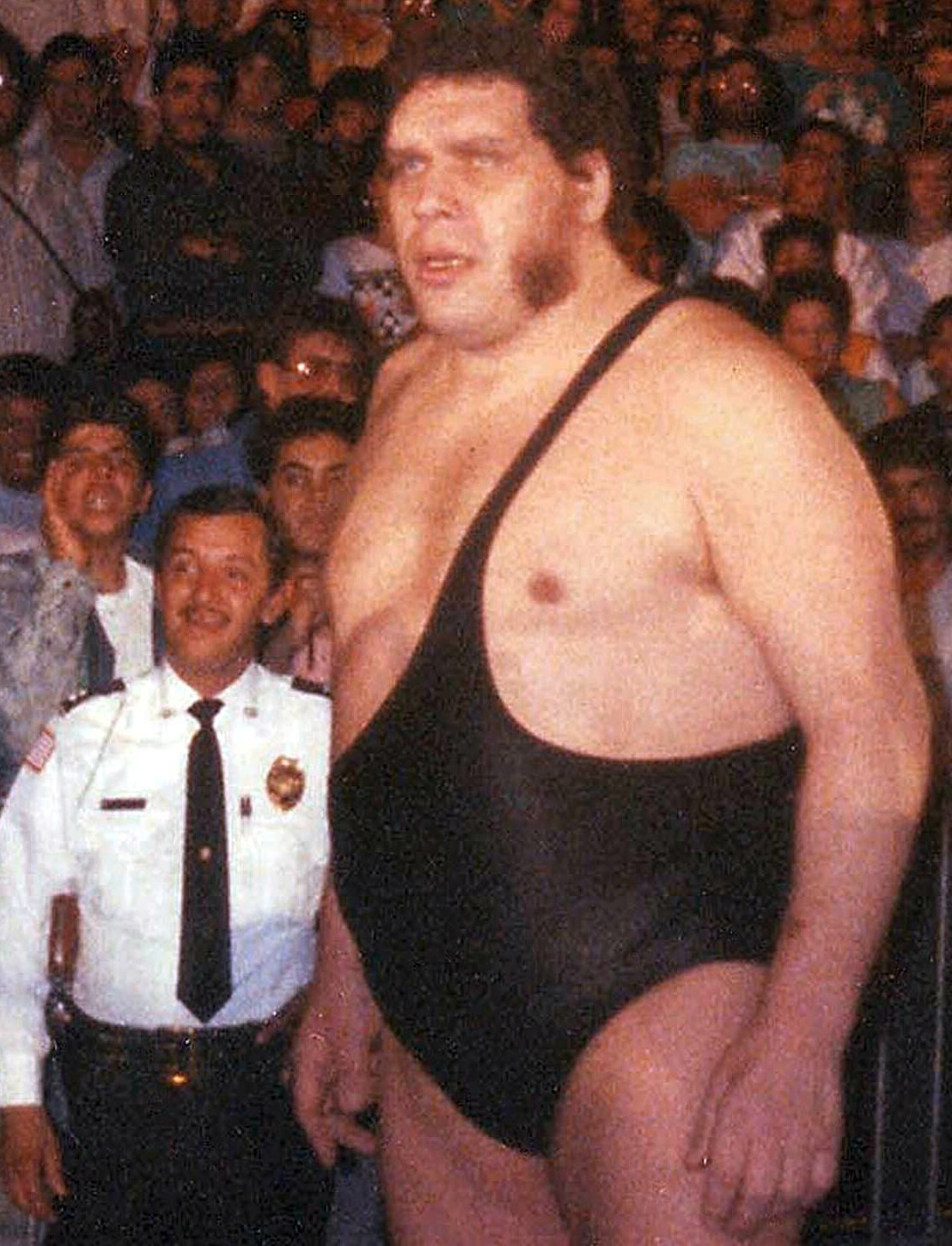
André the Giant

- 11 January – Gilles Gaetner, politician
- 14 February – Tina Aumont, actress (died 2006)
- 2 March – Paul-Henri Nargeolet, explorer (died 2023)
- 7 April – Colette Besson, Olympic athlete (died 2005)
- 13 May – Jean Rondeau, motor racing driver and constructor (died 1985)
- 16 May – Jean-Michel Gaillard, politician (died 2005)
- 17 May – Philippe Tillous-Borde, entrepreneur and engineer (died 2022)
- 19 May – André the Giant, professional wrestler (died 1993)
- 17 June – Gérard Grisey, composer (died 1998)

=== July to December ===
- 22 July – Mireille Mathieu, singer
- 25 July – Nicole Farhi, sculptor and fashion designer
- 9 August - Alain Dorval, voice actor of Sylvester Stallone (died 2024).
- 23 September – Roger Rossat-Mignod, alpine skier
- 30 September – Claude Vorilhon, leader of Raëlian Movement
- 8 October – Jean-Jacques Beineix, film director (died 2022)
- 6 November – Romain Argyroudis, soccer player
- 18 November – Pierre Chanal, soldier and suspected serial killer (died 2003)
- 8 December – Jacques Bourboulon, photographer
- 17 December – François Lamoureux, European civil servant (died 2006)
- 24 December :
  - Daniel Beretta, retired voice actor and singer (died 2024)
  - Roselyne Bachelot, politician

=== Full date unknown ===
- Denise Pumain, geographer

== Deaths ==
- 11 February – Ludovic-Oscar Frossard, socialist, communist politician (born 1889)
- 12 February – Georges Dumas, doctor, psychologist (born 1866)
- 25 February – René Le Grevès, cyclist (born 1910)
- 9 June – Charles Burguet, film director (born 1878)
- 10 August – Léon Gaumont, inventor, engineer, film pioneer and industrialist (born 1864)
- 16 September – Henri Gouraud, general (born 1867)
- 20 September – Raimu, actor (born 1883)
- 5 October – Cécile Brunschvicg, politician (born 1877)
- 12 December – Renée Jeanne Falconetti, actress (born 1892)

== See also ==
- List of French films of 1946
