= 2002 in France =

- Decades: 1980s; 1990s; 2000s; 2010s; 2020s
- See also: History of France; Timeline of French history; List of years in France

Events from the year 2002 in France.

== Incumbents ==
- President: Jacques Chirac
- Prime Minister: Lionel Jospin (until 7 May), Jean-Pierre Raffarin (starting 7 May)

== Events ==
- 1 January – The Euro Currency officially became the legal tender for France, along with the other European Union (EU) Eurozone member area countries, replacing the French franc by being introduced physically with the official launch of the currency coins and banknotes.
- 6 March – France agrees to return the remains of Saartjie Baartman to South Africa.
- 21 April – first round of the presidential election: Jacques Chirac and Jean-Marie le Pen poll the most votes. This was a major political event, both nationally and internationally, as it was the first time someone Le Pen with such far-right views had qualified for the second round of a French presidential election. Two weeks of demonstrations against the National Front follow.
- 5 May – second round of the presidential election. Jacques Chirac returns for a second term as President of the French Republic.
- 6 May – nomination of Jean-Pierre Raffarin for the post of Prime Minister.
- 9 June – first round of the legislative elections
- 16 June – second round of legislative elections.
- 14 July – During Bastille Day celebrations, Jacques Chirac escapes an assassination attempt unscathed.
- November – Citroën launches a revised model of its popular Berlingo leisure activity vehicle.
- November – Renault launches the second generation of Mégane hatchback range of hatchbacks, estates, convertibles and saloons.
- December – The Renault Megane II is voted European Car of the Year.
- Date unknown:
  - Danyel Waro, fyer bâtard documentary film is released.
  - Trident Media Guard company is founded.

== Sport ==
- 6 July – Tour de France begins.
- 21 July – French Grand Prix won by Michael Schumacher of Germany.
- 28 July – Tour de France ends, won by Lance Armstrong of the United States.

== Births ==
- 15 February – Pauline Astier, French basketball player
- 22 July – Jules Bouyer, French diver
- 10 November – Eduardo Camavinga, French footballer

== Deaths ==
=== January to March ===
- 11 January – Henri Verneuil, playwright and filmmaker (born 1920).
- 13 January – Pierre Joubert, illustrator (born 1910).
- 23 January
  - Pierre Bourdieu, sociologist (born 1930).
  - Maurice Limat, science fiction author (born 1914).
- 13 February – Pauline Trigère, fashion designer (born 1908).
- 14 February – Geneviève de Gaulle-Anthonioz, member of the French Resistance and president of ATD Quart Monde (born 1920).
- 21 February – Georges Vedel, public law professor (born 1910).
- 8 March – Robert Dun, writer and SS officer (born 1920).
- 12 March – Louis-Marie Billé, cardinal (born 1938).
- 22 March – Marcel Hansenne, middle-distance runner (born 1917).

=== April to June ===
- 19 April – Jean-Pierre Destrumelle, soccer player and manager (born 1941).
- 22 May – Niki de Saint Phalle, sculptor, painter and filmmaker (born 1930).
- 25 May – Michel Jobert, politician (born 1921).
- 29 May – François Ovide, guitarist (born 1952).
- 6 June – Bernard Destremau, tennis player (born 1917).
- 12 June – Jean de Beaumont, sport shooter (born 1904).
- 29 June – François Périer, actor (born 1919).
- 30 June
  - Claude Berge, mathematician (born 1926).
  - Roger Lévêque, cyclist (born 1920).

=== July to September ===
- 2 July – Jean-Yves Daniel-Lesur, organist and composer (born 1908).
- 3 July – Michel Henry, philosopher and novelist (born 1922).
- 31 July – Claude Rifat, biologist, psychonaut, political activist, writer and researcher.
- 2 August – Jean-Pierre Yvaral, artist (born 1934).
- 6 August – Jean Sauvagnargues, politician and Minister (born 1915).
- 8 September – Henri Rol-Tanguy, communist and leader in the French Resistance (born 1908).

=== October to December ===
- 12 October – Audrey Mestre, free-diver (born 1974).
- 25 October – René Thom, mathematician (born 1923).
- 26 October – Jacques Massu, general (born 1908).
- 31 October
  - Lionel Poilâne, boulanger and entrepreneur (born c1945).
  - Raymond Savignac, graphic artist (born 1907).
- 10 November – Michel Boisrond, film director and writer (born 1921).
- 23 November – Maritie Carpentier, television producer (born 1922).
- 29 November – Daniel Gélin, actor, director and screenwriter (born 1921).
- 1 December – Bernard Blossac, fashion illustrator (born 1917).

=== Full date unknown ===
- Jacques Poirier, painter (born 1928).

== See also ==
- 2002 in French television
- List of French films of 2002
