= 2006 in France =

- Decades: 1980s; 1990s; 2000s; 2010s; 2020s
- See also: History of France; Timeline of French history; List of years in France

This article lists events from the year 2006 in France.

== Incumbents ==
- President: Jacques Chirac
- Prime Minister: Dominique de Villepin

== Events ==
- February - April – Youth protests in France.
- 9 March – Sablé-sur-Sarthe hostage crisis: A former teacher takes 23 hostages including 21 students.
- April – France formally charges six defendants of the Guantanamo Bay detainment camp.
- July – France begins the trial against six defendants of the Guantanamo Bay detainment camp.
- 11 October – A train crash at Zoufftgen kills six people.
- 16 November – Franco–Italian–Spanish Middle East Peace Plan is announced.
- Full date unknown:
  - Axess Vision Technology, a medical device manufacturer is founded.

== Births ==
- 8 March – Warren Zaïre-Emery, footballer
- 12 June – Nell Angloma, basketball player
- 7 December – Baptiste Addis, archer

== Deaths ==
=== January ===
- 16 January – Rebiha Khebtani, politician (born 1926).
- 21 January – Jean-Marie Goasmat, cyclist (born 1913).
- 27 January – Jean-Christophe Lafaille, mountaineer (born 1965).

=== February ===
- 9 February – André Strappe, international soccer player (born 1928).
- 12 February – Henri Guédon, percussionist (born 1944).
- 13 February – Ilan Halimi, kidnap and murder victim (b. c1982).
- 14 February – Darry Cowl, musician and actor (born 1925).

=== March ===
- 9 March – Jean Leymarie, art historian (born 1919).
- 10 March – Jean Hermil, Roman Catholic bishop of Viviers (born 1917).
- 22 March – Pierre Clostermann, flying ace, author, engineer and politician (born 1921).
- March – Jean Desclaux, rugby union coach (born 1922).

=== April ===
- 5 April – Alain de Boissieu, Army chief-of-staff (born 1914).
- 17 April – Jean Bernard, physician and haematologist (born 1907).
- 25 April – Roger Duchêne, biographer (born 1930).
- 30 April – Jean-François Revel, politician, journalist, author and philosopher (born 1924).

=== May ===
- 1 May – Jean-Pierre Hubert, author (born 1941).
- 9 May – Edouard Jaguer, poet and art critic (born 1924).
- 23 May – Philippe Amaury, publishing tycoon and entrepreneur (born 1940).
- 24 May – Claude Piéplu, actor (born 1923).
- 26 May – Édouard Michelin, businessman (born 1963)
- 26 May – Raymond Triboulet, resistance fighter and politician (born 1906).
- 27 May – Michael Riffaterre, literary critic and theorist (born 1924).
- 29 May – Johnny Servoz-Gavin, motor racing driver (born 1942).

=== June ===
- 5 June – André Mandouze, academic and journalist (born 1916).
- 6 June – Léon Weil, World War I veteran (born 1896).
- 11 June – Rolande Falcinelli, organist, pianist and composer (born 1920).
- 15 June – Raymond Devos, humorist, comedian and clown (born 1922).
- 19 June – René Renou, wine expert (born 1952).
- 20 June – Raymond Daudel, theoretical and quantum chemist (born 1920).
- 21 June – Jacques Lanzmann, writer, scriptwriter and lyric writer (born 1927).

=== July ===
- 3 July – Francis Cammaerts, Special Operations Executive (SOE) agent (born 1916).
- 8 July – Catherine Leroy, photojournalist and photographer (born 1945).
- 19 July - Pascal Renwick, French voice actor (born 1954)
- 20 July – Charles Bettelheim, economist and historian (born 1913).
- 20 July – Gérard Oury, actor, writer and producer (born 1919).
- 28 July – Irène Skorik, ballet dancer, actress and composer (born 1924/1928)
- 29 July – Pierre Vidal-Naquet, historian (born 1930).

=== August ===
- 2 August – Maurice Kriegel-Valrimont, militant communist, resistance fighter and politician (born 1914).
- 10 August – Olivier Lecerf, businessman and racehorse owner (b. c1928).
- 17 August – Bernard Rapp, film director and television news presenter (born 1945).
- 26 August – François Lamoureux, European civil servant (born 1946).
- 26 August – Marie-Dominique Philippe, Dominican philosopher and theologian (born 1912).

=== September ===
- 1 September – Nathalie Gautier, politician (born 1951).
- 3 September – Françoise Claustre, archaeologist, (born 1937).
- 9 September – Gérard Brach, film director and screenwriter (born 1927).
- 11 September – Solange Fernex, pacifist activist and politician (born 1934).
- 20 September – Henri Jayer, vintner (born 1922).
- 30 September – André Schwarz-Bart, novelist (born 1928).

=== October ===
- 6 October – Claude Luter, jazz clarinetist (born 1923).
- 9 October – Coccinelle, transsexual actress and entertainer (born 1931).
- 9 October – Danièle Huillet, filmmaker (born 1936).
- 12 October – Eugène Martin, motor racing driver (born 1915).
- 17 October – Daniel Emilfork, actor (born 1924).
- 28 October – Tina Aumont, actress (born 1946).

=== November ===
- 2 November – Adrien Douady, mathematician (born 1935).
- 3 November – Paul Mauriat, musical director (born 1925).
- 7 November – Jean-Jacques Servan-Schreiber, journalist and politician (born 1924).
- 10 November – Maurice Floquet, France's oldest man on record (born 1894).
- 11 November – Anicée Alvina, singer and actress (born 1953).
- 12 November – Alphonse Halimi, boxer (born 1932).
- 14 November – Gustave Choquet, mathematician (born 1915).
- 14 November – Bertrand Poirot-Delpech, journalist, essayist and novelist (born 1929).
- 23 November – Philippe Noiret, actor (born 1930).

=== December ===
- 1 December – Claude Jade, actress (born 1948).
- 27 December – Pierre Delanoë, songwriter/lyricist (born 1918).

=== Full date unknown ===
- Janine Chasseguet-Smirgel, psychoanalyst (born 1928).
