= 2001 in France =

- Decades: 1980s; 1990s; 2000s; 2010s; 2020s
- See also: History of France; Timeline of French history; List of years in France

The following lists events from the year 2001 in France.

== Incumbents ==
- President: Jacques Chirac
- Prime Minister: Lionel Jospin

== Events ==
- March – The Renault Vel Satis is launched at the Geneva Motor Show.
- 8 March – Cantonales Elections are held.
- 11 March – Cantonales Elections are held.
- 11 March – Municipal Elections are held.
- 18 March – Municipal Elections are held.
- April – PSA Peugeot Citroën replaces two of its longest running cars – the Citroën Xantia and Peugeot 306 – with the Citroën C5 and Peugeot 307 respectively.
- September – Citroën launches the all-new C3 hatchback at the Frankfurt Motor Show as a replacement for the outdated Saxo.
- 15 September – Santé Diabète organization is created in Grenoble.
- 21 September – The AZote Fertilisant chemical factory in Toulouse, explodes, killing 29 and seriously wounding over 2500.
- November – The Peugeot 307 is voted European Car of the Year.

== Sport ==
- 15 April – Paris–Roubaix cycle race won by Servais Knaven of the Netherlands.
- 1 July – French Grand Prix won by Michael Schumacher of Germany.
- 7 July – Tour de France begins.
- 29 July – Tour de France ends, won by Lance Armstrong of the United States.

== Births ==
- 26 January – Kenza Fortas, actress
- 24 March – William Saliba, footballer
- 26 March – Khéphren Thuram, footballer
- 5 April – Thylane Blondeau, model and the daughter of soccer player Patrick Blondeau
- 10 April – Lisa Barbelin, archer
- 17 May – Manu Koné, footballer
- 5 September – Janelle Salaün, basketball player
- 6 November – Lucas Chevalier, footballer
- 23 November – Tess Ledeux, freestyle skier
- 12 December – Michael Olise, footballer

== Deaths ==
=== January to March ===
- 1 January - Madeleine Barbulée, actress (b. 1910).
- 10 January – Jacques Marin, actor (b. 1919).
- 30 January
  - Jean-Pierre Aumont, actor (b. 1911).
  - Michel Marcel Navratil, last French survivor and male survivor of the Titanic disaster (b. 1908)
- 5 February – Louise Moreau, politician (b. 1921)
- 8 February – Raymond Polin, philosopher (b. 1910).
- 18 February – Balthus, artist (b. 1908).
- 19 February – Charles Trenet, singer and songwriter (b. 1913).
- Édouard Artigas, fencer (b. 1915).
- 4 March – Jean René Bazaine, painter, stained glass window designer and writer (b. 1904).

=== April to June ===
- 10 April – Jean-Gabriel Albicocco, film director (b. 1936).
- 19 April – André du Bouchet, poet (b. 1924).
- 20 April – Maurice Lauré, creator of taxe sur la valeur ajoutée (TVA) (b. 1917).
- 26 April – André Pascal, songwriter and composer (b. 1932).
- 6 May – René Bondoux, fencer (b. 1905)
- 14 May – Paul Bénichou, writer, critic and literary historian (b. 1908).
- 15 May
  - Jean-Philippe Lauer, architect and Egyptologist (b. 1902).
  - Sacha Vierny, cinematographer (b. 1919).
- 17 May – Jacques-Louis Lions, mathematician (b. 1928).
- 6 June – Marie Brémont, supercentenarian, the oldest recognized person in the world from November 2000 until her death (b. 1886).
- 8 June – Lucien Lauk, racing cyclist (b. 1911)
- 11 June – Pierre Eyt, cardinal (b. 1934).
- 15 June – Henri Alekan, cinematographer (b. 1909).
- 18 June – René Dumont, agronomist, sociologist and environmental politician (b. 1904).
- 23 June – Corinne Calvet, actress (b. 1925).

=== July to September ===
- 1 July – Hélène de Beauvoir, painter (b. 1910).
- 3 August – Jeanne Loriod, musician (b. 1928).
- 4 August – Michel de Salzmann, psychiatrist (b. 1923).
- 12 August – Pierre Klossowski, writer, translator and artist (b. 1905).
- 15 August – Raymond Abescat, oldest man in France and oldest veteran in France at the time of his death (b. 1891).
- 25 August – Philippe Léotard, actor and singer (b. 1940).
- 4 September – Simone de la Chaume, golfer (b. 1908).

=== October to December ===
- 18 October – Micheline Ostermeyer, athlete and pianist (b. 1922).
- 31 October – Régine Cavagnoud, alpine skier (b. 1970).
- 11 November – Pierre Billaud, radio reporter and journalist, killed in Afghanistan (b. 1970).
- Pierre Chevalier, caver and mountaineer (b. 1905).
- 12 December – Jean Richard, actor (b. 1921).
- 14 December – André Tollet, chairman of the Paris liberation committee (b. 1913).
- 18 December – Gilbert Bécaud, singer, composer and actor (b. 1927).
- 19 December – Marcel Mule, classical saxophonist (b. 1901).
- 25 December – Marcel Bleibtreu, Trotskyist activist and theorist (b. 1918).

== See also ==
- 2001 in French television
- List of French films of 2001
