= 1953 in France =

- Decades: 1930s; 1940s; 1950s; 1960s; 1970s
- See also: History of France; Timeline of French history; List of years in France

The following events occurred in France in the year 1953.

== Incumbents ==
- President: Vincent Auriol
- President of the Council of Ministers:
  - until 8 January: Antoine Pinay
  - 8 January – 28 June: René Mayer
  - starting 28 June: Joseph Laniel

== Events ==
- 4 January – Operation Bretagne ends, with French victory over the Viet Minh in Vietnam.
- 9 May – France agrees to the provisional independence of Cambodia with the king Norodom Sihanouk.
- 5 July – First meeting of the assembly of the European Economic Community in Strasbourg.
- 17 July – Miss France Christiane Martel Won Miss Universe 1953
- 28 July – Operation Camargue, further French military action against the Viet Minh, begins.
- 10 August – Operation Camargue ends.
- 13 August – 4 million workers go on strike in France to protest against austerity measures.
- 25 August – General strike ends in France.
- 9 November – Cambodia becomes independent from France.
- 20 November – Operation Castor, airborne operation to establish a fortified airhead in Điện Biên Province, starts.
- 22 November – Operation Castor ends.

== Arts and literature ==
- 4 January – En Attendant Godot premiered at Théâtre de Babylone

== Sport ==
- 3 July – Tour de France begins.
- 27 July – Tour de France ends, won by Louison Bobet.

== Births ==
- 28 January – Anicée Alvina, singer and actress (died 2006)
- 9 February – Michèle Rivasi, politician (died 2023)
- 20 February – Gérard Araud, diplomat
- 4 March – Rose Laurens, singer-songwriter (died 2018)
- 16 March – Isabelle Huppert, actress
- 15 July – Jean-Luc Fichet, politician
- 8 August – Jean Hélène, journalist (died 2003)
- 19 August – Benoît Régent, actor (died 1994)
- 22 September – Ségolène Royal, politician
- 12 October – Serge Lepeltier, politician
- 14 November – Dominique de Villepin, politician, Prime Minister of France
- 23 November – Francis Cabrel, singer-songwriter
- 29 November – Christine Pascal, actress, writer and director (died 1996)
- 1 December – Antoine de Caunes, television presenter, actor, writer and film director

== Deaths ==
- 24 March – Paul Couturier, priest and promoter of the concept of Christian unity (born 1881)
- 4 April – Rachilde, author (born 1860)
- 25 June – Francis Méano, footballer (born 1931)
- 4 July – Jean Becquerel, physicist (born 1878)
- 9 August – Auguste Giroux, rugby union player (born 1874)
- 29 November – Henri Gance, weightlifter and Olympic gold medalist (born 1888)
- 30 November – Francis Picabia, painter and poet (born 1879)

== See also ==
- List of French films of 1953
