= 1952 in France =

- Decades: 1930s; 1940s; 1950s; 1960s; 1970s
- See also: History of France; Timeline of French history; List of years in France

Events from the year 1952 in France.

== Incumbents ==
- President: Vincent Auriol
- President of the Council of Ministers:
  - until 20 January: René Pleven
  - 20 January-8 March: Edgar Faure
  - starting 8 March: Antoine Pinay

== Events ==
- 25 February – Battle of Hòa Bình ends in defeat for French forces by the Việt Minh in Vietnam.
- 1 October – Operation Bretagne begins in Vietnam.
- 19 October – Alain Bombard begins to sail from Canary Islands to Barbados in 65 days; he reaches them 23 December.
- 29 October – Operation Lorraine begins.
- October – Battle of Nà Sản begins.
- 8 November – Operation Lorraine ends with no decisive result.
- 2 December – Battle of Nà Sản ends in French victory.
- Luxury brand Givenchy is founded by fashion designer Hubert de Givenchy.

== Arts and literature ==
- 1 June – Roman Catholic Church bans books of André Gide.

== Sport ==
- 25 June – Tour de France begins.
- 19 July – Tour de France ends, won by Fausto Coppi of Italy.

== Births ==
- 25 January – Sara Mandiano, singer and songwriter.
- 2 February – Christiane Taubira, politician.
- 4 February – Gabriel Yacoub, musician and visual artist. (died 2025)
- 15 February – Dominique Mouillot, business leader.
- 26 March – Didier Pironi, motor racing driver (died 1987)
- 27 March – Maria Schneider, actress (died 2011)
- 1 April – Bernard Stiegler, philosopher (died 2020)
- 2 April – Thierry Le Luron, impersonator and humorist (died 1986)
- 23 April – Jean-Dominique Bauby, journalist, author and editor (died 1997)
- 11 May – Renaud, singer
- 31 May – Carole Achache, writer, photographer and actress (died 2016)
- 3 June – Dominique Laffin, actress (died 1985)
- 7 June – Hubert Auriol, motor racing driver (died 2021)
- 16 June – René Renou, wine expert (died 2006)
- 27 June – Lydia Schenardi, politician and Member of the European Parliament
- 16 July – Jean Paul Gaultier, fashion designer
- 31 August – Edwy Plenel, journalist and editor of Le Monde
- 23 October – Pierre Moerlen, drummer and percussionist (died 2005)
- 25 October – Florence Picaut, athlete
- October – François Ovide, guitarist (died 2002)
- 4 December – Farid Chopel, actor, comedian and singer (died 2008)
- 7 December – Gisèle Pelicot, mass rape victim
- 12 December – Roland Roche, alpine skier

=== Full date unknown ===
- Didier Dubois, mathematician
- Françoise Thébaud, historian, professor emeritus

== Deaths ==
- 11 January – Jean de Lattre de Tassigny, general, military hero of World War II (born 1889)
- 18 May – Henry Bérenger, diplomat (born 1867)
- 16 July – Jean Chantavoine, musicologist and biographer (born 1877)
- 3 November – Louis Verneuil, playwright and screenwriter (born 1893)
- 18 November – Paul Éluard, poet (born 1895)
- 19 November – Marcel Henriot, World War I flying ace (born 1896)
- 27 November – Abel Lefranc, literary historian (born 1863)
- 5 December – André Lefaur, actor (born 1879)
- Full date unknown
  - Gabrielle Petit (feminist), feminist activist, anticlerical, libertarian socialist, and newspaper editor (born 1860)

== See also ==
- List of French films of 1952
