= 1945 in France =

- Decades: 1920s; 1930s; 1940s; 1950s; 1960s
- See also: History of France; Timeline of French history; List of years in France

Events from the year 1945 in France.

== Incumbents ==
- Chairman of the Provisional Government (also Prime Minister): Charles de Gaulle

== Events ==
- 1 January? – Jean-Paul Sartre refuses the Legion of Honour.
- 6 February – Writer Robert Brasillach executed for collaboration with the Germans.
- 9 March – Japanese coup d'état in French Indochina: Japanese forces overthrow the Vichy French Decoux Government in Vietnam.
- 2 May – Colette is the first woman to be admitted to the Académie Goncourt.
- 7 May – General Alfred Jodl signs unconditional surrender terms at Rheims, ending Germany's participation in the war. The document takes effect the next day.
- 8 May – World War II ends in Europe.
- 8–29 May – In Algeria, French troops kill an estimated 6,000 Algerian citizens in the Sétif massacre.
- 23 July – Marshal Philippe Pétain, chief of state of Vichy France goes on trial, charged with treason.
- 31 July – Pierre Laval, fugitive former prime minister of Vichy France, surrenders to Allied soldiers in Austria.
- 19–30 August – Việt Minh under Ho Chi Minh carry out the August Revolution in Vietnam.
- October – École nationale d'administration established.
- 15 October – Pierre Laval, former prime minister of Vichy France, is executed by firing squad for treason.
- 21 October – Legislative Election held. Women are allowed to vote for the first time.
- 13 November – Charles de Gaulle elected head of a French provisional government.
- 2 December – French banks (Banque de France, BNCI, CNEP, Crédit Lyonnais and Société Générale) are nationalized.
- 21 December – André Malraux is appointed minister of information by de Gaulle.
- Duralex glass tableware manufacturers established in La Chapelle-Saint-Mesmin.
- La tennis Bensimon business is founded.

== Births ==
- 22 January – Jean-Pierre Nicolas, racing driver and manager
- 17 February – Bernard Rapp, film director and television news presenter (died 2006)
- 4 April – Daniel Cohn-Bendit, political activist and politician
- 7 April – Joël Robuchon, chef (died 2018)
- 15 April – Christian Bergelin, politician (died 2008)
- 15 June – Françoise Chandernagor, writer
- 16 June – François Rossé, composer (died 2026)
- 20 June – Jean-Claude Izzo, poet, playwright, screenwriter and novelist (died 2000)
- 27 June – Catherine Lacoste, golfer
- 30 July – Patrick Modiano, novelist, Nobel laureate
- 12 August – Jean Nouvel, architect
- 27 August – Catherine Leroy, photojournalist and photographer (died 2006)
- 12 October – Aurore Clément, actress
- 13 October – Christophe (Daniel Bevilacqua), singer-songwriter (died 2020)
- 16 October – Pascal Sevran, television presenter and author (died 2008)
- 28 October – François-Xavier Verschave, a founder of NGO Survie (died 2005)

== Deaths ==
- 5 February -
  - Denise Bloch, heroine of World War II (born 1916)
  - Lilian Rolfe, heroine of World War II (born 1914)
  - Violette Szabo, World War II Allied secret agent (born 1921)
- 6 February – Robert Brasillach, author, executed for collaboration (born 1909)
- 23 March – Elisabeth de Rothschild, World War II heroine (born 1902)
- 30 March – Élise Rivet, nun and World War II heroine (born 1890)
- 3 April – Raoul Dutheil, footballer (born 1903)
- 8 June – Robert Desnos, surrealist poet (born 1900)
- 20 July – Paul Valéry, poet, essayist and philosopher (born 1871)
- 8 August – Le Pétomane (Joseph Pujol), flatulist (born 1857)
- 15 October – Pierre Laval, politician and Prime Minister, executed (born 1883)
- 26 October – Paul Pelliot, sinologist and explorer (born 1878)

== See also ==
- List of French films of 1945
