= 1947 in France =

- Decades: 1920s; 1930s; 1940s; 1950s; 1960s
- See also: History of France; Timeline of French history; List of years in France

Events from the year 1947 in France.

== Incumbents ==
- President: Léon Blum (until 16 January), Vincent Auriol (starting 16 January)
- President of the Council of Ministers:
  - until 22 January: Léon Blum
  - 22 January – 24 November: Paul Ramadier
  - starting 24 November: Robert Schuman

== Events ==
- 16 January – Vincent Auriol is inaugurated as President of France.
- 10 February – Paris peace treaties are signed between the World War II Allies and Italy, Hungary, Romania, Bulgaria and Finland.
- 12 February – Christian Dior introduces The "New Look" in women's fashion, in Paris.
- 28 February – United States gives France a military base in Casablanca.
- 29 March – Malagasy Uprising: Nationalist "tribesmen" began a revolt in the eastern part of Madagascar against French rule.
- 6 May – Malagasy Uprising: In Moramanga, the French military machine-gun Mouvement démocratique de la rénovation malgache (MDRM) officials detained in wagons, killing 124 to 160 mostly unarmed activists.
- 11 July – SS Exodus departs France for Palestine with 4,500 Jewish Holocaust survivor refugees.
- 27 July – Ocean Liberty explodes in Brest harbour causing at least 26 deaths and extensive damage.
- July – Five North-African regiments arrive in Madagascar to assist in quelling the Malagasy Uprising.
- 27 August – Government lowering of the bread ration to 200 grammes causes riots in Verdun and Le Mans.
- 30 August – Fire at a cinema in Rueil, a suburb of Paris, kills 87.
- September – Festival d'Avignon first staged.
- 7 October – Operation Léa begins in Vietnam, an attempt by the French to crush the Viet Minh.
- 10 November – The arrest of four steel workers in Marseille begins a communist riot that spreads to Paris.
- 20 November – Paul Ramadier resigns as Prime Minister of France – he is succeeded by Robert Schuman. Schuman calls 80,000 reservists to quell rioting miners.
- 27 November – In Paris, police occupy the editorial offices of communist newspapers.
- 3 December – French communist strikers derail the Paris-Tourcoing express train because of false rumours that it is transporting soldiers – 21 dead.
- 4 December – Interior minister Jules Moch secures emergency measures against riots after six days of violent arguments in the National Assembly of France.
- 9 December – Labour unions call off the general strike and begin negotiations with the French government.
- 22 December – Operation Lea ends with a tactical success for the French forces.

== Sport ==
- 25 June – Tour de France begins.
- 20 July – Tour de France ends, won by Jean Robic.

== Births ==
- 1 January – F. R. David, musician
- 16 January – Juliet Berto, actress (died 1990)
- 17 January – Alain Payet, adult film director (died 2007)
- 31 January – Bernard Guignedoux, football player and manager (died 2021)
- 25 February – Marc Sautet, philosopher and writer (died 1998)
- 1 April – Alain Connes, mathematician
- 4 April – Jacques Frantz, actor (died 2021)
- 7 April – Michèle Torr, singer
- 10 April – Daniel Bilalian, journalist and television presenter (died 2025)
- 13 April – Jean-Jacques Laffont, economist (died 2004)
- 15 June – Alain Aspect, quantum physicist, recipient of the Nobel Prize in Physics
- 4 July – Jacques Morali, music producer (died 1991)
- 10 July – Michel Étiévent, journalist, historian and writer (died 2021)
- 24 July – Jacques Fouroux, international rugby union player, coach (died 2005)
- 30 July – Françoise Barré-Sinoussi, virologist, recipient of the Nobel Prize in Physiology or Medicine*2 *2 August – Marie-Laure de Decker, photographer (died 2023)
- 3 September – Gérard Houllier, football manager (died 2020)
- 20 September – Patrick Poivre d'Arvor, television news presenter
- 28 September – Bernard Charvin, alpine skier
- 9 October – France Gall, singer (died 2018)
- 21 October – Dominique Braye, politician
- 28 November – Michel Berger, singer and songwriter (died 1992)
- 1 December – Henri Bréchu, alpine skier
- 2 December – Isaac Bitton, drummer

== Deaths ==
- 23 January – Pierre Bonnard, painter and printmaker (born 1867)
- 19 February – Pierre Besnard, revolutionary syndicalist (born 1886)
- 15 March – Jean-Richard Bloch, critic, novelist and playwright (born 1884)
- 13 April – Jean Chassagne, racing driver (born 1881)
- 14 June – Albert Marquet, painter (born 1875)
- 21 September – Marcel Astier, politician (born 1885)
- 24 November – Léon-Paul Fargue, poet and essayist (born 1876)
- 7 December – Tristan Bernard, playwright, novelist, journalist and lawyer (born 1866)

=== Full date unknown ===
- Mary Bonaparte, eldest daughter of Prince Napoléon Bonaparte of Canino (born 1870)

== See also ==
- List of French films of 1947
