= Bensimon =

Bensimon may refer to:

== People ==
- Albert Bensimon (born 1948), Egyptian-born Australian businessman
- Doris Bensimon (1924–2009), Austrian-born French sociologist and academic
- Gilles Bensimon (born 1944), French fashion photographer
- Jacques Bensimon (1943–2012), Canadian film and television director, producer and executive
- Kelly Bensimon (born 1968), American author, socialite and former model

== Other ==
- Bensimon, French lifestyle brand
