= Ballet at the Edinburgh International Festival: history and repertoire, 1947–1956 =

Ballet was an important part of the Edinburgh International Festival from its earliest days, with performances taking place at the Empire Theatre, later to be refurbished to become the Edinburgh Festival Theatre.

The first company to appear was the Sadler's Wells Ballet Company who returned many times later, together with a series of visiting companies from abroad.

== List ==
Date	Company	Ballet	Venue	Choreographer(s)	Principal dancers	Notes and sources
1947	Sadler's Wells Ballet Company	The Sleeping Beauty	Empire Theatre	Frederick Ashton	Margot Fonteyn	
1948	Sadler's Wells Ballet Company	La Boutique fantasque, Miracle in the Gorbals, Symphonic Variations, Coppélia, Checkmate, Clock Symphony, Scènes de ballet, Mam'zelle Angot, Les Sylphides, Job, The Three-Cornered Hat	Empire Theatre	Frederick Ashton	Margot Fonteyn	
1949	Ballets des Champs-Élysées	13 danses, Jeu de cartes, The Nutcracker, Les forains, Mascarade, Le rendez-vous, Swan Lake, Le rencontre, Fêtes galantes, Le création, Don Quichotte, Valse caprice, La Sylphide, Le Cygne noir, Le jeune homme et la mort, La fiancée du diable, Orphéus, L'oiseau bleu, Le bal des blanchisseuses, Coppélia, L'amour et son amour, Pas de quatre, Les amours de Jupiter	Empire Theatre	Victor Gsovsky	Jean Babilée, Leslie Caron, Tutte Enderle, Christiani Franki, Helene Sadovska, Irène Skorik, Helene Varanova	
1950	American National Ballet Theatre	Theme and Variations, Fall River Legend, Fancy Free	Empire Theatre			
1950	Grand Ballet du Marquis de Cuevas (Le Grand Ballet de Monte Carlo)	Swan Lake (Act II), Giselle (two acts), and others	Empire Theatre			
1951	Sadler's Wells Ballet Company	Swan Lake, Les patineurs, Tiresias, Wedding Bouquet, Checkmate, Symphonic Variations, Don Quixote, The Rake’s Progress, Ballet Imperial, Job	Empire Theatre		Margot Fonteyn, Moira Shearer	
1951	Yugoslav Ballet	The Legend of Ohrid, The Ballad of a Medieval Love, Gingerbread Heart	Empire Theatre	Margarita Froman; Pina and Pio Mlakar; Dimitriye Parlitch		
1952	Sadler's Wells Ballet Company	Coppélia, Les Rendezvous, Reflection, Pineapple Poll	Empire Theatre			
1952	Grand Ballet du Marquis de Cuevas (Le Grand Ballet de Monte Carlo)	Concerto Barocco, Scaramouche, Pas-de-trois, Prisoner in the Caucasus, Night Shadow, Ines de Castro, Tarasiana, Del amor y de muerte	Empire Theatre			
1953	American National Ballet Theatre	Constantia, Circo de Espana, Black Swan (pas de deux), Rodeo, Billy the Kid, Schumann Concerto, Graduation Ball	Empire Theatre			
1953	The Spanish Ballet of Pilar López	Spanish dances and music	Empire Theatre	Pilar López		
1953	Sadler's Wells Ballet Company	Pastorale, The Rake's Progress, Blood Wedding, Fête étrange, Harlequin in April, Carte blanche	Empire Theatre			
1954	Sadler's Wells Ballet Company	Homage to Diaghilev: Le tricorne, L'Oiseau de feu, La Boutique fantasque	Empire Theatre	Michel Fokine, Léonide Massine		
1955	Royal Danish Ballet	La Sylphide, Capricious Lucinda, Romeo and Juliet, Napoli, Graduation Ball, The Whims of Cupid and the Ballet Master	Empire Theatre			
1956	Sadler's Wells Ballet Company	Noctambules, Birthday offering, The Lady and the Fool, Coppélia, Les Sylphides, The Miraculous Mandarin, Homage to the Queen, Le lac des cygnes,	Empire Theatre		Margot Fonteyn, Beryl Grey, Nadia Nerina, Rowena Jackson, Svetlana Berisova, Michael Somes	
1956	The Ram Gopal Indian Ballet	The Legend of the Taj Mahal	Empire Theatre	Ram Gopal	Ram Gopal, Kumudini Devi, Shevanti Devi	

== See also ==
- Edinburgh International Festival
- Ballet at the Edinburgh International Festival: history and repertoire, 1957–1966
- Ballet at the Edinburgh International Festival: history and repertoire, 1967–1976
- Opera at the Edinburgh International Festival: history and repertoire, 1947–1956
- Opera at the Edinburgh International Festival: history and repertoire, 1957–1966
- Opera at the Edinburgh International Festival: history and repertoire, 1967–1976
- Drama at the Edinburgh International Festival: history and repertoire, 1947–1956
- Drama at the Edinburgh International Festival: history and repertoire, 1957–1966
- Drama at the Edinburgh International Festival: history and repertoire, 1967–1976
- Musicians at the Edinburgh International Festival, 1947–1956
- Musicians at the Edinburgh International Festival, 1957–1966
- Musicians at the Edinburgh International Festival, 1967–1976
- Visual Arts at the Edinburgh International Festival, 1947–1976
- World premieres at the Edinburgh International Festival
