= 1944 in France =

- Decades: 1920s; 1930s; 1940s; 1950s; 1960s
- See also: History of France; Timeline of French history; List of years in France

Events from the year 1944 in France.

== Incumbents ==
- Chairman of the Provisional Government: Philippe Pétain (until 20 August), Charles de Gaulle (starting 20 August)
- Vice-President of the Council of Ministers: Pierre Laval (until 20 August), Charles de Gaulle (starting 20 August)

== Events ==
- 15 March – The National Council of the French Resistance approves the Resistance programme.
- 1 June – BBC transmits coded messages (including the first line of a poem by Paul Verlaine) to underground resistance fighters in France warning that the invasion of Europe is imminent.
- 2 June – The provisional French government is established.
- 5 June
  - More than 1000 British bombers drop 5000 tons of bombs on German gun batteries on the Normandy coast in preparation for D-Day.
  - At 10:15 p.m. local time, the BBC transmits coded messages including the second line of the Paul Verlaine poem to the underground resistance indicating that the invasion of Europe is about to begin.
- 6 June
  - Battle of Normandy begins – Operation Overlord, code named D-Day, commences with the landing of 155,000 Allied troops on the beaches of Normandy.
  - Battle of Cherbourg begins.
- 7 June – Bayeux liberated by British troops.
- 9 June – Over 200 people are killed by 2nd SS Panzer Division ("Das Reich") in the Tulle massacre
- 10 June
  - 642 people are killed by 2nd SS Panzer Division ("Das Reich") in the Oradour-sur-Glane massacre.
  - Battle of Carentan begins.
- 13 June – Battle of Bloody Gulch, near Carentan, United States forces victory.
- 14 June – Battle of Carentan ends with Allied victory.
- 26 June – American troops enter Cherbourg.
- 30 June – Battle of Cherbourg ends with the fall of the strategically valuable port to American forces.
- 9 July – British and Canadian forces capture Caen.
- 9 August – Ordonnance du 9 août 1944 relative au rétablissement de la légalité républicaine sur le territoire continental declares the Constitutional Law of 1940 issued by the Provisional Government void ab initio.
- 12 August – The world's first undersea oil pipeline is laid, between England and France in Operation Pluto.
- 15 August – Operation Dragoon lands Allies in southern France.
- 19 August – Liberation of Paris: The city rises against German occupation with the help of Allied troops.
- 20 August – American forces defeat German forces at Chambois. This victory closed the Falaise Gap.
- 24 August – Liberation of Paris: The Allies enter Paris, successfully completing Operation Overlord.
- 25 August
  - German surrender of Paris: General Dietrich von Choltitz surrenders Paris to the Allies, in defiance of Hitler's orders to destroy it.
  - Maillé massacre: 129 civilians (70% women and children) are massacred by the Gestapo at Maillé, Indre-et-Loire.
  - The Red Ball Express convoy system begins operation, supplying tons of materiel to Allied forces in France.
- 26 August
  - Toulon liberated in Battle of Toulon (1944).
  - Ordonnance instituting Indignité nationale.
- 28 August – Marseille liberated in Battle of Marseille.
- 8 September – Menton is liberated from Germany.
- 11 September – Northern and Southern France invasion forces link up near Dijon.
- 24 September – The U.S. Army 45th Infantry Division takes the strongly defended city of Epinal before crossing the Moselle River and entering the western foothills of the Vosges.
- 5 October – Royal Canadian Air Force pilots shoot down the first German jet fighter over France.
- 31 October – Mass murderer Marcel Petiot is apprehended in a Paris Métro station.
- 9 November – Collaborationist Georges Suarez becomes the first journalist executed during the épuration légale.
- 23 November – Liberation of Strasbourg.
- 19 December – Newspaper Le Monde first published in Paris.
- Toymaker Jouef established.

== Arts and literature ==
- 6 February – Première of Jean Anouilh's tragedy Antigone, at the Théâtre de l'Atelier in Nazi-occupied Paris.
- May – Première of Jean-Paul Sartre's existentialist drama Huis Clos, at the Théâtre du Vieux-Colombier in Nazi-occupied Paris.

== Births ==
=== January to June ===
- 17 January – Françoise Hardy, singer (died 2024)
- 26 January – Louis Gallois, businessman
- 10 February – Jean-Daniel Cadinot, film director and producer (died 2008)
- 25 February – François Cevert, motor racing driver (died 1973)
- 7 April – Jean-Pierre Brucato, soccer player (died 1998)
- 22 May – Henri Guédon, percussionist (died 2006)
- 25 May – Pierre Bachelet, singer songwriter (died 2005)
- 26 May – Laurent-Michel Vacher, philosopher, writer and journalist (died 2005)
- 22 June
  - Pierre Goldman, left-wing intellectual, convicted of several robberies and assassinated (died 1979)
  - Gérard Mourou, electrical engineer, recipient of the Nobel Prize in Physics
- 24 June – Ticky Holgado, actor (died 2004)

=== July to December ===
- 6 July – Claude-Michel Schönberg, composer
- 12 July – Jean-François Jenny-Clark, double bass player (died 1998)
- 9 August – Patrick Depailler, motor racing driver (died 1980)
- 14 August – Jean-François Bizot, journalist and writer (died 2007)
- 17 August – Jean-Bernard Pommier, pianist and conductor (died 2026)
- 18 August – Françoise Lebrun, actress
- 2 September – Gilles Marchal, songwriter and singer (died 2013)
- 6 September – Christian Boltanski, photographer, sculptor and installation artist (died 2021)

=== Full date unknown ===
- Jean-Jacques Le Chenadec, urban violence victim (died 2005)

== Deaths ==
- 14 January – Eugène Louis Bouvier, entomologist and carcinologist (born 1856)
- 31 January – Jean Giraudoux, novelist, essayist, diplomat and playwright (born 1882)
- 4 February – Yvette Guilbert, singer and actress (born 1865)
- 24 February – Fanny Clar, journalist and writer (born 1875)
- 5 March – Max Jacob, poet, painter, writer and critic (born 1876)
- 22 March – Pierre Brossolette, journalist and Resistance fighter (born 1903)
- 30 April – Paul Poiret, fashion designer (born 1879)
- 20 May – Fraser Barron, New Zealand bomber pilot at Le Mans (born 1921 in Dunedin)
- 6 July
  - Andrée Borrel, French World War II heroine (executed) (born 1919)
  - Sonia Olschanezky, German-born French Jewish World War II heroine (executed) (born 1923)
- 7 July – Georges Mandel, politician and Resistance leader (executed) (born 1885)
- 15 July – Joseph Sadi-Lecointe, aviator (born 1891)
- 31 July – Antoine de Saint-Exupéry, pilot and writer (born 1900)
- 1 August – Jean Prévost, writer, journalist and member of the Maquis (born 1901)
- 17 August – Paul Wormser, Olympic fencer (born 1905)
- 9 September – Robert Benoist, motor racing driver and war hero (executed) (born 1895)
- 11 September – Yolande Beekman, World War II heroine (executed) (born 1911)
- 13 September – Madeleine Damerment, World War II heroine (executed) (born 1917)
- 1 November – Lucien Cayeux, sedimentary petrographer (born 1864)
- 5 November – Alexis Carrel, surgeon and biologist, recipient of the Nobel Prize in Physiology or Medicine (born 1873)
- 13 December- Wassily Kandinsky, artist (born 1866)
- 30 December – Romain Rolland, writer, Nobel Prize in Literature (born 1866)

== See also ==
- List of French films of 1944
