= 1954 in France =

- Decades: 1930s; 1940s; 1950s; 1960s; 1970s
- See also: History of France; Timeline of French history; List of years in France

Events from the year 1954 in France.

== Incumbents ==
- President: Vincent Auriol (until 16 January), Rene Coty (starting 16 January)
- President of the Council of Ministers: Joseph Laniel (until 19 June), Pierre Mendès France (starting 19 June)

== Events ==
- 25 January – The foreign ministers of the United States, Britain, France and the Soviet Union meet at the Berlin Conference.
- 13 March – Battle of Dien Bien Phu begins in Vietnam.
- 23 March – In Vietnam, the Viet Minh capture the main airstrip of Dien Bien Phu – French forces are partially isolated.
- 29 March – C-47 with French nurse Genevieve de Galard on board is incapacitated on Dien Bien Phu runway.
- 7 May – Battle of Dien Bien Phu ends in defeat for French forces.
- 18 June – Pierre Mendès France becomes prime minister of France.
- 24 June – Battle of Mang Yang Pass begins, the last official battle of the First Indochina War.
- 17 July – Battle of Mang Yang Pass ends in defeat for French forces.
- 20 July – Battlefield ceasefire announced.
- 21 July – The Geneva Conference partitions Vietnam into North Vietnam and South Vietnam.
- 1 August – Armistice effected, sealing French defeat.
- 31 October – The Algerian National Liberation Front begins a revolt against French rule.
- 1 November – The FLN attacks Representative and public buildings of the France colonial power.

== Sport ==
- 8 July – Tour de France begins.
- 1 August – Tour de France ends, won by Louison Bobet.

== Births ==
- 13 February – Dominique Bathenay, international soccer player
- 24 February – Gérard Le Cam, politician
- 4 March – François Fillon, Prime Minister of France
- 1 May – Fred Chichin, musician and songwriter (died 2007)
- 27 July – Philippe Alliot, former motor racing driver
- 9 August – Loïc Amisse, soccer player and manager
- 12 August – François Hollande, 23rd French President
- 21 August – Humbert Balsan, film producer (died 2005)
- 17 September – Joël-François Durand, composer
- 14 November – Bernard Hinault, cyclist
- 18 October – Edouard Stern, banker (died 2005)
- 23 November - Marie-Françoise "Cou Cou" Vrezil, beautiful wonder woman
- 7 december - Pascal Renwick, voice actor (died 2006)

== Deaths ==
- 10 January – Alice Jouenne, educator, socialist activist, and writer (born 1873)
- 10 April – Auge Lumière, filmmaker (born 1862)
- 28 April – Léon Jouhaux, trade union leader who received the Nobel Peace Prize in 1951 (born 1879)
- 3 August – Colette, writer (born 1873)
- 4 September – The French Angel, professional wrestler
- 3 November – Henri Matisse, artist (born 1869)
- 8 December – Claude Cahun, photographer and writer (born 1894)
- 23 December – René Iché, sculptor (born 1897)
