= 2003 in France =

- Decades: 1980s; 1990s; 2000s; 2010s; 2020s
- See also: History of France; Timeline of French history; List of years in France

Events from the year 2003 in France.

== Incumbents ==
- President – Jacques Chirac
- Prime Minister – Jean-Pierre Raffarin

== Events ==
- 3 March – Speech of Dominique de Villepin, UN against war in Iraq.
- 10 March – President Jacques Chirac promises to veto any UN resolution authorising war in Iraq.
- 11 April – Flactif family murders.
- May – Citroën launches the C3 Pluriel, a small convertible.
- 30 May – Last flight of Air France's Concorde between Paris and New York.
- 1 June – 29th G8 summit in Évian-les-Bains starts, with tight security and tens of thousands of protesters.
- 7 July – Corsica voters reject a referendum for increased autonomy from France by a very narrow margin.
- 11 August – A heat wave in Paris causes temperatures up to 44 °C (112 °F).
- September – Citroën cease production of the decade-old Saxo to be replaced by the 3-door C2. The Peugeot 106 also ceases production by this time.
- 24 October – The Concorde makes its last commercial flight.
- 24 December – At the request of the United States Embassy in Paris, the French Government orders Air France to cancel several flights between France and the U.S. in response to terrorist concerns.

== Births ==
- 19 May – Malo Gusto, footballer
- 24 August – Alexandre Coste, illegitimate son of Albert II, Prince of Monaco.
- 17 November – Luce Douady, climber (d. 2020)
- 6 December – Olivia Onesti, cyclist

== Deaths ==
=== January to March ===
- 11 January – Maurice Pialat, film director, screenwriter and actor (born 1925).
- 19 January – Françoise Giroud, journalist, screenwriter, writer and politician (born 1916).
- 30 January – Paul-André Meyer, mathematician (born 1934).
- 10 February – Alfred Aston, international soccer player (born 1912).
- 20 February – Maurice Blanchot, writer, philosopher, and literary theorist (born 1907).
- 22 February – Daniel Toscan du Plantier, film critic.
- 24 February – Bernard Loiseau, chef (born 1951).
- 28 February – Albert Batteux, international soccer player and manager (born 1919).
- 4 March – Sébastien Japrisot, author, screenwriter and film director (born 1931).
- 14 March – Jean-Luc Lagardère, engineer and businessman (born 1928).

=== April to June ===
- 7 April – Cecile de Brunhoff, storyteller (born 1903).
- 17 April – Jean-Pierre Dogliani, soccer player (born 1942).
- 18 April – Jean Drucker, journalist.
- 23 April – Fernand Fonssagrives, photographer (born 1910).
- 12 May – Prince Sadruddin Aga Khan, United Nations High Commissioner for Refugees (born 1933).
- 23 May – Jean Yanne, humorist, actor and film director (born 1933).
- 24 May – François Boyer, screenwriter (born 1920).
- 25 May – Laurette Séjourné, archeologist and ethnologist (born 1911).
- 27 May – Jacques Henri-Labourdette, architect (born 1915).
- 29 May – Pierre Restany, art critic and cultural philosopher (born 1930).
- 31 May – Nicolas Barone, cyclist (born 1931).
- 7 June – Georges Pichard, comics artist (born 1920).
- 13 June – Guy Lux, game show host and producer (born 1919).

=== July to September ===
- 4 July – André Claveau, singer (born 1911).
- 18 July – Marc Camoletti, playwright (born 1923).
- August – Christian Boussus, tennis player (born 1908).
- 1 August – Marie Trintignant, actress (born 1962).
- 9 August – Jacques Deray, film director (born 1929).
- 27 August – Pierre Poujade, politician (born 1920).
- 31 August – Pierre Cahuzac, soccer player (born 1927).
- 27 September – Jean Lucas, motor racing driver (born 1917).

=== October to December ===
- 15 October – Pierre Chanal, soldier and suspected serial killer (born 1946).
- 16 November – Bettina Goislard, United Nations worker (born 1974).
- 21 October – Jean Hélène, journalist (born 1953).
- 22 October – Philippe Ragueneau, journalist and writer (born 1917).
- 26 November – Stefan Wul, writer (born 1922).
- 6 December – Paul-Louis Halley, billionaire businessman (born 1934).
- 25 December – Francine Lancelot, dancer, choreographer and dance historian (born 1929).
- 26 December – Georges Boudarel, academic and Communist militant (born 1926).
- December – Guy Héraud, politician and lawyer (born 1920).
