= 2000 in France =

- Decades: 1980s; 1990s; 2000s; 2010s; 2020s
- See also: History of France; Timeline of French history; List of years in France

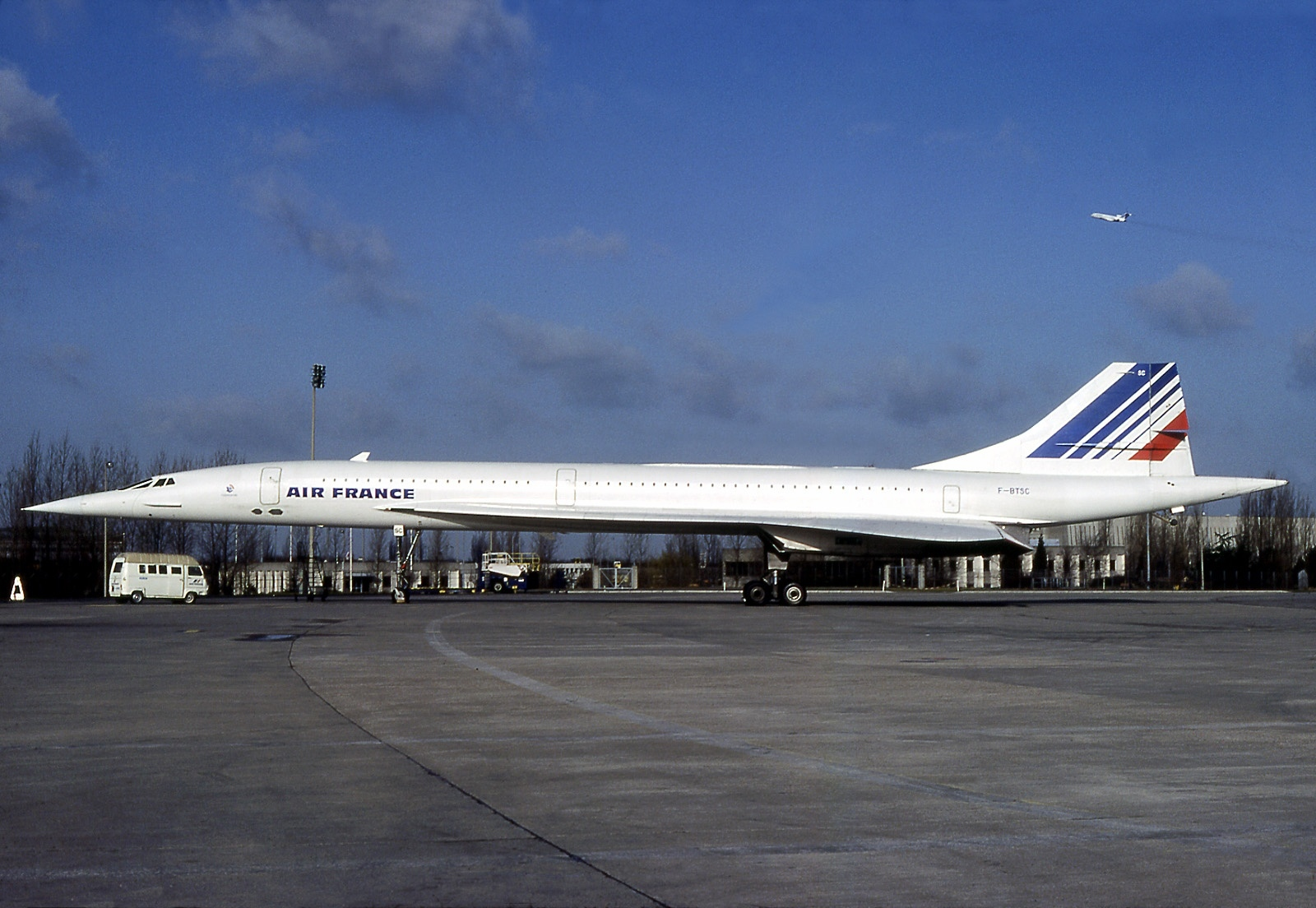
Concorde crash on July 25, 2000 in Gonesse, France

The following lists events that happened during 2000 in France.

The year 2000 is in particular remembered in France by a media campaign on the conditions of detention of prisoners. A parliamentary board of inquiry was created. The conclusions of the report were that French prisons were both unhealthy and over-populated. The sanitary arrangements were considered to be scandalous. The government of Lionel Jospin launched a programme to renovate and build new prisons.

== Incumbents ==
- President: Jacques Chirac
- Prime Minister: Lionel Jospin

== Events ==
=== February ===
- 1 February – a 35-hour working week imposed on companies of over 20 employees (see also Working Time Directive).

=== June ===
- June – National Assembly votes in favour of changing the Presidential term to five years.

=== July ===
- 2 July – France wins the UEFA European Football Championship.
- 25 July – Air France Flight 4590 Concorde crashed outside Paris killing all 109 passengers and crew.

=== September ===
- 24 September – Constitutional Referendum is held on whether the presidential mandate should be reduced from seven to five years.

=== November ===
- 4 November – a demonstration is held in Paris for the abolition of prisons.

=== Undated ===
- Agora Fidelio – French alternative rock band is active, until 2012.

== Births ==
- 16 February – Amine Gouiri, footballer
- 6 April – Maxence Lacroix, footballer
- 3 August – Léo Rispal, singer
- 8 August – Félix Auger-Aliassime, Canadian tennis player

== Deaths ==
=== January to March ===
- 1 January – Jean-Claude Izzo, poet, playwright, screenwriter and novelist (b. 1945)
- 2 January – Henri René Guieu, science fiction writer (b. 1926)
- 3 February – Pierre Plantard, draughtsman, principal perpetrator of the Priory of Sion hoax (b. 1920)
- 5 February – Claude Autant-Lara, film director and later MEP (b. 1901)
- 11 February
  - Jacqueline Auriol, aviator who set several world speed records (b. 1917)
  - Roger Vadim, film director (b. 1928)
- 28 February – Jean Vallette d'Osia, Lieutenant General (b. 1898)
- 5 March – Lolo Ferrari, dancer, porn star, actress, and singer (b. 1963)

=== April to June ===
- 11 April – Pierre Ghestem, bridge and checkers player (b. 1922)
- 20 May – Jean-Pierre Rampal, flautist (b. 1922)
- 6 June – Frédéric Dard, writer (b. 1921)
- 22 June – Philippe Chatrier, tennis player (b. 1926)
- 25 June – Pascal Themanlys, poet, Zionist, and Kabbalist (b. 1909)
- 27 June – Pierre Pflimlin, politician and Prime Minister (b. 1907)
- 28 June – Sid Ahmed Rezala, French serial killer (b. 1979)

=== July to September ===
- 3 July – André Guinier, physicist (b. 1911)
- 17 July – Pascale Audret, actress (b. 1936)
- 18 July – René Chocat, basketball player (b. 1920)
- 22 July – Claude Sautet, author and film director (b. 1924)
- 10 August – Paul Badré, aircraft pilot and engineer (b. 1906)
- 14 August – Alain Fournier, computer graphics researcher (b. 1943)
- 25 August – Antoine Guillaumont, archaeologist and Syriac scholar (b. 1915)
- 26 August – Odette Joyeux, actress and writer (b. 1914)
- 20 September – Jeanloup Sieff, photographer (b. 1933)

=== October to December ===
- 22 October –Suzanne Haïk-Vantoura, organist, music teacher, composer and music theorist (b. 1912).
- 10 November
  - Jacques Chaban-Delmas, Gaullist politician and Prime Minister (b. 1915)
  - Gérard Granel, philosopher and translator (b. 1930)
- 12 November – Franck Pourcel, composer, arranger and conductor of popular music and classical music (b. 1913)
- 16 November – Ahmet Kaya, Turkish–Kurdish folk singer, he was living in France since 1999 until his death. (b. 1957)
- 17 November – Louis Néel, physicist, the Nobel Prize for Physics in 1970 (b. 1904)
- 22 November – Théodore Monod, naturalist, explorer and humanist scholar (b. 1902)
- 25 November – Raymond Janot, politician
- 29 November – Bernard Pertuiset, neurosurgeon (b. 1920)
- 15 December – Jacques Goddet, sports journalist and Tour de France director (b. 1905)
- 19 December – Michel Dens, baritone (b. 1911)
- 19 December – Pierre Allain, climber (b. 1904)
- 28 December – Jacques Laurent, writer and journalist (b. 1919)
