= 1950 in France =

- Decades: 1930s; 1940s; 1950s; 1960s; 1970s
- See also: History of France; Timeline of French history; List of years in France

Events from the year 1950 in France.

== Incumbents ==
- President: Vincent Auriol
- President of the Council of Ministers:
  - until 2 July: Georges Bidault
  - 2 July-12 July: Henri Queuille
  - starting 12 July: René Pleven

== Events ==
- 11 February – Two Viet Cong battalions attack a French base in French Indochina.
- 12 February – Pro-communist riots in Paris.
- 9 April – Notre-Dame Affair, Lettrist movement anti-Catholic intervention.
- 3 June – Herzog and Lachenal of the French Annapurna expedition become the first climbers to reach the summit of an 8,000-metre peak.
- 15–18 September – Battle of Đông Khê, French defeat in First Indochina War.
- 30 September – Battle of Route Coloniale 4 begins.
- 18 October – Battle of Route Coloniale 4 ends in decisive victory for the Việt Minh.
- 20 October – Henri Martin affair: a sailor is imprisoned for distributing propaganda hostile to the First Indochina War.

== Sport ==
- 13 July – Tour de France begins.
- 7 August – Tour de France ends, won by Ferdinand Kübler of Switzerland.

== Births ==
- 24 January – Daniel Auteuil, actor and director
- 15 February – Guy Touvron, trumpeter (died 2024)
- 22 February – Miou-Miou, actress.
- 5 March – Bernard Vera, politician
- 21 April – Michel Rougerie, motorcycle racer (died 1981)
- 8 May – Aimé Venel, painter
- 9 August
  - Anémone, French actress, filmmaker and political activist (died 2019)
  - Nicole Tourneur, French novelist (died 2011)
- 25 September – Philippe Peythieu, actor.

== Deaths ==
- 6 February – Georges Imbert, chemical engineer (born 1884)
- 2 March – Joseph d'Arbaud, poet (born 1874)
- 6 March – Albert Lebrun, politician and President of France (born 1871)
- 16 April – Arnaud Massy, golfer (born 1877)
- 28 September – Joë Bousquet, poet (born 1897)
- 10 November – Jean Biondi, politician (born 1900; car crash)
- 11 November – Pierre-Jules Boulanger, engineer and businessman (born 1885; car crash)

== See also ==
- List of French films of 1950
