= Visual Arts at the Edinburgh International Festival, 1947–1976 =

The Visual Arts at the Edinburgh International Festival, 1947 to 1976 lists exhibitions during the first three decades of the festival.

Although they were not featured in the first two festivals in 1947 and 1948, from 1949 the visual arts became an important feature with a series of exhibitions at the Royal Scottish Academy and the National Gallery of Scotland.

During the first decade, they tended to be devoted to famous major artists—from Rembrandt to the Impressionists. While in the second and third decades, there were also ones showcasing particular collections, and national schools of artists. Archaeological treasures were shown at the Royal Scottish Museum, now known as the National Museum of Scotland, and some others were connected with the performing arts.

== Galleries ==
Since the 19th-century, Edinburgh has enjoyed good facilities for showing the visual arts. During the first three decades, the Royal Scottish Academy was the main gallery used by the festival, hosting an least 22 exhibitions. The other main locations were the Royal Scottish Museum now known as the National Museum of Scotland, where eight exhibitions were held, and the National Gallery of Scotland which had five. Edinburgh College of Art and Waverley Market in Princes Street each held three exhibitions. The Scottish National Gallery of Modern Art, City of Edinburgh Art Gallery and the Fruit Market Gallery, Market Street each had 2 exhibitions. In addition there were at least another 10 places used for smaller exhibitions.

== List of exhibitions ==
Year	Exhibition	Place	Notes
1949	Exhibition of Dutch and Flemish Paintings from the Collection of the Marquess of Bute	National Gallery of Scotland	
1950	Rembrandt	National Gallery of Scotland	
1951	Spanish Paintings (El Greco to Goya)	National Gallery of Scotland	
1952	Degas	Royal Scottish Academy	
1953	Renoir	Royal Scottish Academy	
1953	Medieval Frescoes from the Churches and Monasteries of Yugoslavia	Royal Scottish Museum	
1954	Cézanne	Royal Scottish Academy	
1954	Treasures from the Barber Institute (Birmingham)	National Gallery of Scotland	
1954	Homage to Diaghilev	Edinburgh College of Art	
1955	Gauguin	Royal Scottish Academy	
1956	Braque	Royal Scottish Academy	
1957	Monet	Royal Scottish Academy	
1958	Masterpieces of Byzantine Art	Royal Scottish Museum	
1958	Moltzau Collection (Cézanne to Picasso)	Royal Scottish Academy	
1959	Masterpieces of Czech Art	Royal Scottish Academy	
1960	Blue Rider Group: an Exhibition of German Expressionist Painting	Royal Scottish Academy	
1961	Epstein Memorial Exhibition	Waverley Market, Princes Street	
1961	Selection from the Bührle Collection (Zürich)	Royal Scottish Academy	
1962	Modern Primitive Paintings from Yugoslavia	National Gallery of Scotland	
1962	Matisse and After (from the Sonja Henie — Niels Onstad Collection in Oslo	Royal Scottish Academy	
1963	Modigliani and Soutine	Royal Scottish Academy	
1963	Music and Dance in Indian Art		
1964	Delacroix	Royal Scottish Academy	
1965	Corot	Royal Scottish Academy	
1965	Treasures of Rumanian Art	Royal Scottish Museum	
1966	Rouault	Royal Scottish Academy	
1967	Derain	Royal Scottish Academy	
1967	Two hundred summers in a day	Waverley Market	
1967	Treasures from Scottish Houses	Royal Scottish Museum	
1967	Edinburgh Open 10	David Hume Tower, University of Edinburgh	
1968	Charles Rennie Mackintosh	Royal Scottish Museum	
1968	Wotruba	Royal Scottish Museum	
1968	Boudin to Picasso	Royal Scottish Academy	
1968	Canada 101	Edinburgh College of Art	
1968	Hoffnung Exhibition	English Speaking Union	
1969	Sixteenth century Italian drawings from British private collections	Merchants' Hall	
1969	Contemporary Polish art	Scottish National Gallery of Modern Art	
1969	Jack Coia gold medallist	Royal Incorporation of Architects, 15 Rutland Square	
1969	Pomp (works of art from the City of London)	Royal Scottish Museum	
1970	Early Celtic art	Royal Scottish Museum	
1970	Contemporary German art from Düsseldorf	Edinburgh College of Art	
1971	The Belgian contribution to surrealism	Royal Scottish Academy	
1971	Sir Walter Scott Bicentenary	Parliament House	
1971	Writer to the Nation (Walter Scott)	Waverley Market	
1971	Contemporary Romanian art	Richard Demarco Gallery	
1972	Alan Davie	Royal Scottish Academy	
1972	Italian seventeenth-century drawings from British private collection	Merchants' Hall	
1972	Exhibition of Polish Contemporary Art	Richard Demarco Gallery	
1973	Permanences e l'Art Francais	Royal Scottish Academy	
1973	Objects USA	City of Edinburgh Art Gallery	
1973	Tyrone Guthrie Exhibition	Assembly Hall, forecourt	
1974	Aachen International 70/74	Royal Scottish Academy	
1974	Eighteenth-century musical instruments: France and Britain	City of Edinburgh Art Gallery	
1974	EDA Eleven Dutch artists	Fruit Market Gallery, Market Street	
1975	Kandinsky	Scottish National Gallery of Modern Art	
1975	A kind of gentle painting, an Exhibition of Elizabethan Miniatures by Nicholas Hilliard and Isaac Oliver	Scottish Arts Council Gallery, 19 Charlotte Square	
1975	Eight from Berlin	Fruit Market Gallery, Market Street	
1975	Recording Scotland's Heritage	Canongate Tolbooth Museum	
1976	The Royal Scottish Academy, 150th anniversary summer exhibition	Royal Scottish Academy	
1976	Hepworth	Royal Botanic Garden	

== See also ==
- Edinburgh International Festival
- Opera at the Edinburgh International Festival: history and repertoire, 1947–1956
- Opera at the Edinburgh International Festival: history and repertoire, 1957–1966
- Opera at the Edinburgh International Festival: history and repertoire, 1967–1976
- Ballet at the Edinburgh International Festival: history and repertoire, 1947–1956
- Ballet at the Edinburgh International Festival: history and repertoire, 1957–1966
- Ballet at the Edinburgh International Festival: history and repertoire, 1967–1976
- Drama at the Edinburgh International Festival: history and repertoire, 1947–1956
- Drama at the Edinburgh International Festival: history and repertoire, 1957–1966
- Drama at the Edinburgh International Festival: history and repertoire, 1967–1976
- Musicians at the Edinburgh International Festival, 1947–1956
- Musicians at the Edinburgh International Festival, 1957–1966
- Musicians at the Edinburgh International Festival, 1967–1976
- World premieres at the Edinburgh International Festival
