= 1948 in France =

- Decades: 1920s; 1930s; 1940s; 1950s; 1960s
- See also: History of France; Timeline of French history; List of years in France

Events from the year 1948 in France.

== Incumbents ==
- President: Vincent Auriol
- President of the Council of Ministers:
  - until 24 July: Robert Schuman
  - 24 July-2 September: André Marie
  - 2 September-11 September: Robert Schuman
  - starting 11 September: Henri Queuille

== Events ==
- 17 March – Treaty of Brussels, is signed by Belgium, France, Luxembourg, the Netherlands and the United Kingdom, aimed mainly at defending against possible German rearmament.
- 5 September – Robert Schuman becomes Prime Minister of France.
- 7 October – Citroën 2CV economy car introduced at the Paris Motor Show.

== Sport ==
- 30 June – Tour de France begins.
- 25 July – Tour de France ends, won by Gino Bartali of Italy.

== Births ==
- 17 February – Philippe Khorsand, actor (died 2008)
- 10 March – Jean-Pierre Adams, international soccer player (died 2021)
- 11 March – Dominique Sanda, actress
- 9 April – Bernard-Marie Koltès, playwright and director (died 1989)
- 20 June – Véronique de Montchalin, politician
- 19 July – Bernard Drubay, sailor
- 30 July – Jean Reno, actor
- 3 August – Jean-Pierre Raffarin, former Prime Minister of France
- 18 September – Jean-Louis Pichon, stage director and opera manager (died 2025)
- 8 October – Claude Jade, actress (died 2006)
- 27 December – Gérard Depardieu, actor

== Deaths ==
- 7 January – Jean-Baptiste Chabot, priest and Syriac scholar (born 1860)
- 15 January – Henri-Alexandre Deslandres, astronomer (born 1853)
- 12 February – Caroline Lacroix, courtesan (born 1883)
- 4 March
  - Antonin Artaud, dramatist, poet, actor and director (born 1896; cancer)
  - Lucien Rouzet, physicist and inventor (born 1886)
- 12 March – Antoine François Alfred Lacroix, mineralogist and geologist (born 1863)
- 5 July – Georges Bernanos, author (born 1888)
- 6 July – René de Labarrière, first UN soldier killed in action (born 1899; killed by landmine)
- 31 July – Georges Blondel, historian (born 1856)
- 25 September – Pierre Frondaie, poet, novelist and playwright (born 1884)
- 11 October – André Bloch, mathematician (born 1893; leukaemia)

== See also ==
- List of French films of 1948
