= Trevor O'Keeffe =

Irish murder victim (1967/1968–1987)

Trevor O'Keeffe (1967/1968 – 8 August 1987) was an Irish man who was murdered while hitchhiking in France. His body was found in a shallow grave, having been strangled with a cord. Since 1980, seven young men had disappeared in the so-called 'Triangle of Death' around Mourmelon military camp.

A year after O'Keeffe's murder, chief adjutant Pierre Chanal was stopped by police, who found a Hungarian hitchhiker bound and gagged in the back of his van. In 1990 Chanal was convicted of kidnapping and rape. He was released from prison in 1995. O'Keeffe's mother, Eroline, tried for 16 years to get the French authorities to bring Chanal to trial for the murder of her son. Chanal committed suicide in the hospital after his previous attempt in prison in 2003 while on trial. Mrs. O'Keeffe later wrote a book about her experiences.
