= 1949 in France =

- Decades: 1920s; 1930s; 1940s; 1950s; 1960s
- See also: History of France; Timeline of French history; List of years in France

Events from the year 1949 in France.

== Incumbents ==
- President: Vincent Auriol
- President of the Council of Ministers: Henri Queuille (until 28 October), Georges Bidault (starting 28 October)

== Events ==
- 19–25 August – 1949 Landes forest fire: a wildfire burns 50.000 ha of forest land and kills 82.
- 27 October – Air France Flight 009 flying from Paris Orly Airport to New York crashes on São Miguel Island in the Azores and kills all 48 on board, including violinist Ginette Neveu and boxer Marcel Cerdan.
- Simone de Beauvoir publishes her book The Second Sex (Le Deuxième Sexe), an extremely influential work for second-wave feminism, in Paris.

== Sports ==
- 30 June – Tour de France begins.
- 21 July – Tour de France ends, won by Fausto Coppi of Italy

== Births ==
- 11 January – Max Azria, fashion designer (died 2019)
- 11 January – Jean-Paul Enthoven, philosopher and publisher
- 18 January – Philippe Starck, designer
- 6 February – Olivier Chevallier, motor cycle racer (died 1980)
- 10 February – Maxime Le Forestier, singer
- 2 March – Isabelle Mir, Alpine skier
- 5 March – Bernard Arnault, billionaire businessman
- 22 March – Fanny Ardant, actress
- 1 April – Gérard Mestrallet, businessman
- 16 April – Claude Papi, soccer player (died 1983)
- 24 April – Véronique Sanson, singer-songwriter
- 27 April – Didier Daeninckx, author and politician
- 16 May – Gilles Bertould, athlete
- 13 June – Thierry Sabine, motor cycle racer (died 1986)
- 17 June – Serge Vinçon, politician (died 2007)
- 25 June – Patrick Tambay, racing driver (died 2022)
- 29 June – Henri Proglio, businessman
- 2 July – Bernard-Pierre Donnadieu, actor (died 2010)
- 13 August – Philippe Petit, highwire artist
- 22 October – Arsène Wenger, soccer manager
- 25 October – Alain Escoffier, anti-communist activist, self-immolated (died 1977)
- 13 November – Gérard Lelièvre, racewalker
- 19 November – Raymond Blanc, chef
- Full date unknown – Jean-Claude Irvoas, murder victim (died 2005)

== Deaths ==
- 28 January – Jean-Pierre Wimille, motor racing driver and resistance member (born 1908)
- 16 February – Roger François, weightlifter (born 1900)
- 4 June – Maurice Blondel, philosopher (born 1861)
- 24 September – Pierre de Bréville, composer (born 1861)
- 27 October – Marcel Cerdan, boxer (born 1916)
- 27 October – Ginette Neveu, violinist (born 1919)

== See also ==
- List of French films of 1949
