= 1951 in France =

- Decades: 1930s; 1940s; 1950s; 1960s; 1970s
- See also: History of France; Timeline of French history; List of years in France

Events from the year 1951 in France.

== Incumbents ==
- President: Vincent Auriol
- President of the Council of Ministers:
  - until 10 March: René Pleven
  - 10 March-11 August: Henri Queuille
  - starting 11 August: René Pleven

== Events ==
- 13 January – Battle of Vĩnh Yên begins in Vietnam.
- 17 January – Battle of Vĩnh Yên ends in decisive defeat for the Việt Minh forces.
- 23 March – Battle of Mạo Khê begins.
- 28 March – Battle of Mạo Khê ends in the defeat of Việt Minh forces.
- April – Magazine Cahiers du cinéma is first published.
- 18 April – Treaty of Paris adopted, establishing European Coal and Steel Community.
- 17 June – Legislative Election is held to elect the second National Assembly of the Fourth Republic.
- 11 August – René Pleven becomes Prime Minister of France.
- 10 November – Battle of Hòa Bình begins.
- December – Engagements in the Battle of Hòa Bình continue.

== Sport ==
- The 1951 French rugby league tour of Australia and New Zealand is conducted.
- 4 July – Tour de France begins.
- 29 July – Tour de France ends, won by Hugo Koblet of Switzerland.

== Births ==
- 10 January – Nicolas Philibert, film director and actor
- 13 January – Bernard Loiseau, chef (died 2003)
- 6 February – Jacques Villeret, actor (died 2005)
- 23 September – Nathalie Gautier, politician (died 2006)
- 11 October – Jean-Jacques Goldman, singer and songwriter
- 6 November – Alain Etchegoyen, philosopher and novelist (died 2007)

== Deaths ==
- 7 January
  - René Guénon, orientalist and philosopher (born 1886)
  - Lucien Cuénot, biologist (born 1866)
- 26 January – Henri Bard, international soccer player (born 1892)
- 19 February – André Gide, author and winner of Nobel Prize in literature in 1947 (born 1869)
- 2 June – Émile Chartier, philosopher, journalist and pacifist (born 1868)
- 21 June – Gustave Sandras, artistic gymnast (born 1872)
- 23 July – Philippe Pétain, Marshal of France, later Chief of State of Vichy France (born 1856)
- 11 November – César Vezzani, opera singer (born 1888)

== See also ==
- List of French films of 1951
