= François Rossé =

French composer and musician (1945–2026)

- Rossé in 2015
- Born: 16 June 1945; Reichshoffen, France
- Died: 4 September 2026 (aged 81)
- Education: Conservatoire de Paris
- Occupations: Composer; Pianist; Academic teacher
- Organizations: Conservatoire de Bordeaux
- Awards: Ordre des Arts et des Lettres

François Rossé (French: [fʁɑ̃swa ʁɔse]; 16 June 1945 – 4 September 2026) was a French composer, pianist and academic teacher, especially known for improvisation, for piano as well as with others. One of the last students of Olivier Messiaen, he was a prolific composer of pieces for various ensembles, with a special interest in the saxophone. From 1974 to 1985. he was professor of analysis at the Conservatoire de Bordeaux.

== Life and career ==
Rossé was born in Reichshoffen, Alsace, on 16 June 1945. He was self-taught in music and began serious piano studies at age 17 at the Conservatoire de Strasbourg with Alphonse Foehr. He studied further with Jeannine Bonjean at the École Normale de Musique de Paris. He then studied at the Conservatoire de Paris, first musical analysis, then composition in the classes of Olivier Messiaen, as one of his last students, and of Betsy Jolas. He also studied with Ivo Malec and Paul Méfano. During his studies he was influenced by jazz, poetry, theatre and electronic music.

His improvisations were regarded as having "an inexhaustible imagination", on piano solo or with players such as vocalist Beñat Achiary, Bernard Lubat and saxophonist Jean-Marie Londeix. He was awarded a second prize from the Music and Computing competition. His work Cseallox for cello and saxophone earned him a 1994 prize at the Berlin international composition competition of the Berlin University of the Arts. He was awarded the SACEM "Claude Arrieu" national prize for his complete work.

Rossé was a professor of analysis at the Conservatoire de Bordeaux from 1974 to 1985. There he met Londeix, who encouraged him to begin his career of composition. He taught musical analysis at CEFEDEM training centres, encouraging students "to listen beyond aesthetic categories and institutional norms". He was appointed a Chevalier of the Ordre des Arts et des Lettres in 1991.

=== Personal life ===
Rossé was a resident of Léognan. He was also a poet.

Rossé died on 4 September 2026, at the age of 81. A memorial service was held at the church of Léognan on 10 September.

== Compositions ==
Compositions by Rossé include works for concert bands and for ensembles such as Ensemble l'Itinéraire, Ensemble Aleph, and Percussions de Strasbourg, works for stage music, works including spoken word, and cabaret songs. He wrote spatialised music such as O yelp for fire engines and three saxophonists. He composed for keyboards (piano and organ), strings, winds, voices, and various combinations of instruments.

His approximately 700 works include:

- Virgile for piano (1977) Billaudot
- Stalactites/echos for 2 pianos (1980)
- Piano Center (1989)- Nihsi for piano (1991)
- Handgelöbnis for piano (1997)
- Sonate No. 6 "Wesengesang" for piano (1996)
- Wild Strings for TrioPolycordes (2016)
- Variations for cello (1993) Billaudot
- Le Frêne égaré for alto saxophone alto (1978) Billaudot
- Nishi Asakusa for saxophone and piano
- Løbuk Constrictor for saxophone and piano
- Seaodie I for saxophone and piano
- Seaodie II for saxophone and piano
- Seaodie III for saxophone and piano
- La main dans le souffle for saxophone and piano
- Sonates en Arcs for sax double et sax grave (1982) Salabert
- Mod'son 7 (1985-13 min) 4 saxophonistes (soprano/alto, alto, tenor/alto, baryton/alto) ed. Durand
- O Yelp for 3 saxophones, 1 fire engine (soloist), 9 fire engines (tutti) (1989)
- Arianna for saxophone, Robert Martin (1992)
- Ost-Atem for tenor saxophone and electro-acoustic, Robert Martin (1992)
- Scriu numele tau for soprano saxophone, Robert Martin (1992)
- Oem for soprano and six instruments (1988)
- Mod'son 5 for flute, viola and harp (1984) Billaudot
- Cseallox for baritone saxophone and cello (1993) Bärenreiter
- Jonctionfor alto sax and piano (1999) Billaudot
- Triangle pour un souffle for alto saxophone and strings (1981) Billaudot
- Bachflüssigkeit for 15 instruments (1984) Billaudot
- Ost for violin, piano, bass clarinette, double bass and orchestra (1992)
