= Raymond Abescat =

- Born: 10 September 1891; Paris
- Died: 25 August 2001 (109 years, 349 days); Rueil-Malmaison

Raymond Abescat (10 September 1891 in Paris – 25 August 2001 in Rueil-Malmaison) was one of the last surviving veterans of World War I in France, its oldest living man and its oldest living veteran when he died aged 109 years, 349 days.

== Life ==
Abescat joined the military in October 1912 and spent seven years with an infantry regiment. Immediately following the French declaration of war, his unit was mobilized and sent to the Belgian frontier to await the German advance. During their first engagement his company lost all but 80 soldiers, and most of those were injured. Abescat was slightly injured in that fight. In 1916, he was seriously wounded near Verdun, where fighting cost the lives of 250,000 French and German soldiers.

His leg was amputated late in life, in part due to his old war wound. To his dying day, he kept several small shell fragments that had been taken from his leg in 1916.

After the war, Abescat joined a state financing agency where he worked until his retirement in 1957.

His memory was very clear until the end of his life. As such he was interviewed several times. Segments of his recollections appear in several documentaries. In one he recounts visiting the Exposition Universelle of 1900.

Abescat became the oldest living French man upon the death of 110-year-old Alexis Daigneau on 3 April 2001. He died on 25 August 2001, just 16 days before his 110th birthday, and was succeeded as the oldest living French man by 109-year-old Polish-born Joseph Rabenda.

== Bibliography ==
- "French Veteran of World War I Was 109". Los Angeles Times. 2001-08-29. Archived from the original on May 24, 2011.
- "Legacy of WWI vets promises to outlive them". CNN International. 1998-11-13.
