= Léon Weil =

French military man

Léon Roger Weil (16 July 1896 – 6 June 2006) was one of the last two surviving veterans of the battle of Val-de-Marne in the First World War. He was almost 110 when he died at the Val-de-Grâce military hospital in Paris, France.

Joining the army when he was 20 years old, he was assigned to the fifth battalion of chasseurs à pied (cinquième bataillon de chasseurs à pied) in Alsace and took part in 1917 in the battle of Chemin des Dames. More than 150,000 people died during this battle. He was also a French Resistance fighter during the Second World War under the code name of Victor. After the war, he worked as a sales representative in the women's fashion industry. A fan of theatre and boxing (he was quite a good boxer in his younger days), he continued to swim until the age of 102.

At the time of his death he was one of the last seven surviving officially recognized French veterans of World War I.
