= Axess Vision Technology =

Axess Vision Technology Ltd
- Company type: Privately held
- Industry: Medical technology
- Founded: 2006
- Fate: Acquired (2017)
- Headquarters: Tours
- Key people: Regis Olivier, General Manager
- Products: Medical devices
- Owner: The Surgical Company (TSC) Group
- Number of employees: 18

Axess Vision Technology is a start-up company and manufacturer of medical devices, mainly endoscopes. It is headquartered in Saint Pierre des Corps, France. It is competing with Ambu and Single Use Surgical Ltd to develop the world first generation of disposable endoscopes. These companies are responding to a market need of getting rid of cross contamination from flexible endoscopes, the latter ranked third in the ECRI 2011 top 10 Health Hazards. Even when endoscopes are spotless, there remains a risk of infection of 1%. Therefore, these endoscopes are designed to be used on one patient only before being incinerated.

Its main investors are the venture capitalists OTC Asset Management and Cap Décisif Management, with 2.5 million euros in the first round. Its main competitors are the German Invendo and the English Single Use Surgical. The problematic decontamination of reusable endoscopes and the risk of nosocomial infections seems to have prompted this race for innovation. Indeed, even if traditional endoscopes are cleaned and decontaminated after use, there is always a risk of infection of about 1%. The endoscopes developed by Axess Vision Technology are therefore designed to be used once before being incinerated.

In 2014, a contract was signed with the University Hospital of Rennes.

On February 7, 2017, the company was placed in safeguard proceedings. In the same year, Axess Vision Technology SAS was acquired by The Surgical Company (TSC) Group.

== See also ==
- Medical technology
- Medical device
- Nosocomial infection
- Disposable
