= Santé Diabète =

French non-governmental organization

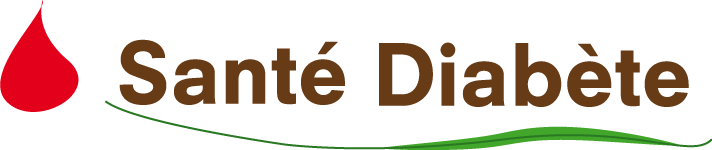
- Abbreviation: SD
- Formation: September 15, 2001; 25 years ago
- Type: Non-governmental organization
- Purpose: Fight against diabetes, "health"
- Headquarters: Grenoble, France
- Region served: Worldwide
- Official language: English, French
- Executive Director: Stéphane Besançon
- Main organ: Board of Directors, elected by the Annual General Meeting
- Staff: 30
- Volunteers: 100
- Website: santediabete.org/en_en/
- Formerly called: Santé Diabète Mali

Santé Diabète (SD) (Health Diabetes) is a French non-governmental organization (NGOs) whose headquarters is in Grenoble (France) which is working on strengthening health systems to improve the prevention and management of diabetes in Africa. As part of a chronic disease like diabetes, improving the quality of care saves thousands of lives but also improves the quality of life for people living with diabetes.

== History ==
The NGO Santé Diabète was created in 2001, by Stephane Besançon current CEO of the organization.

Santé Diabète was created following a research conducted in Mali on the fonio (cereal that is present in West Africa) and diabetes with the International Center for Agronomic Research for Development (CIRAD) which enabled Stephane Besançon to be aware of the impact of diabetes on the African continent but also and especially the lack of access to health care for people living with diabetes in Africa and the lack of consideration of the issue by development actors (sponsors, United Nations, NGOs).

== Purpose ==
Santé Diabète has focused on strengthening health systems to improve the prevention and management of diabetes, by supporting the development of long term field projects, of research projects or short-term expertise in many African countries. The NGO focuses its work on a comprehensive approach including all the axes necessary for the establishment of prevention and care of quality for diabetes. This innovative approach is realized in practice by the development of 6 components:

1. Investing in primary prevention to reduce the human and economic burden of the disease progression.
2. Investing in the decentralization of care to ensure geographic accessibility to a care of quality.
3. Investing in secondary and tertiary prevention "therapeutic education" to reduce the burden of complications due to diabetes.
4. Investing in the reduction of care costs for geographic accessibility to a care of quality.
5. Investing in an integrated approach including active involvement of patients and their families through their associations by promoting self-management mechanisms and advocacy allowing them to defend their rights.
6. Investing in research - action to develop innovative approaches.

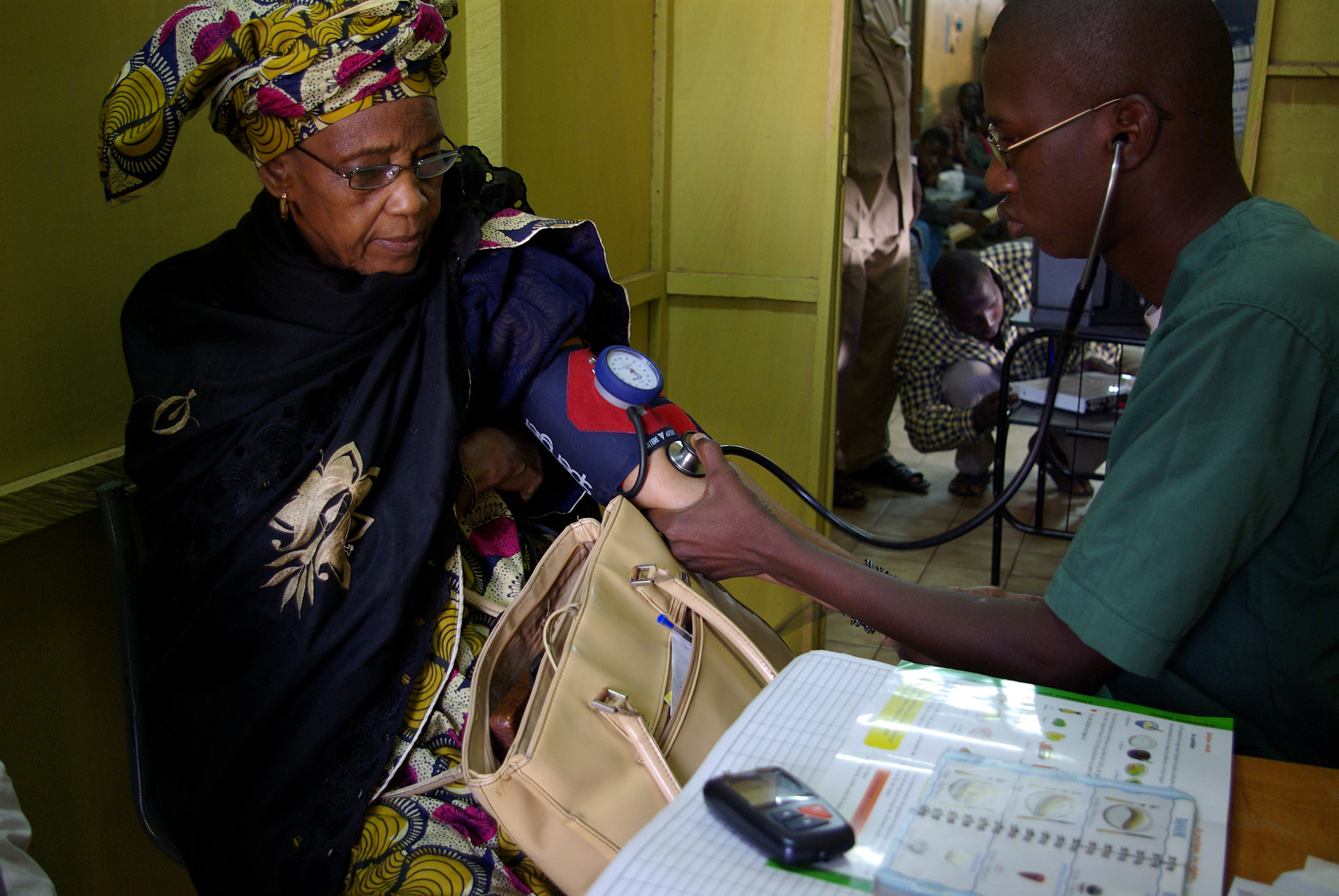
Diabetes consultation

This approach is developed in the field with the institutional partners (public authorities, administrative authorities and local government). This positioning into technical assistance to support prevention policies and treatment of diabetes implemented by the states ensures that the interventions done by the NGO can achieve long-term solutions.

In parallel to these field operations, Santé Diabète support many governments in the development or implementation of their diabetes policy.

More recently, the NGO Santé Diabète has also invested in France in the development of projects in development and international solidarity education.

== Interventions areas ==
=== Field Project ===
- Mali
- Burkina Faso
- Senegal
- Union of the Comoros

=== Research and academic activities ===
Source: Tanzania, Benin and Guinea.

== Internal organization ==
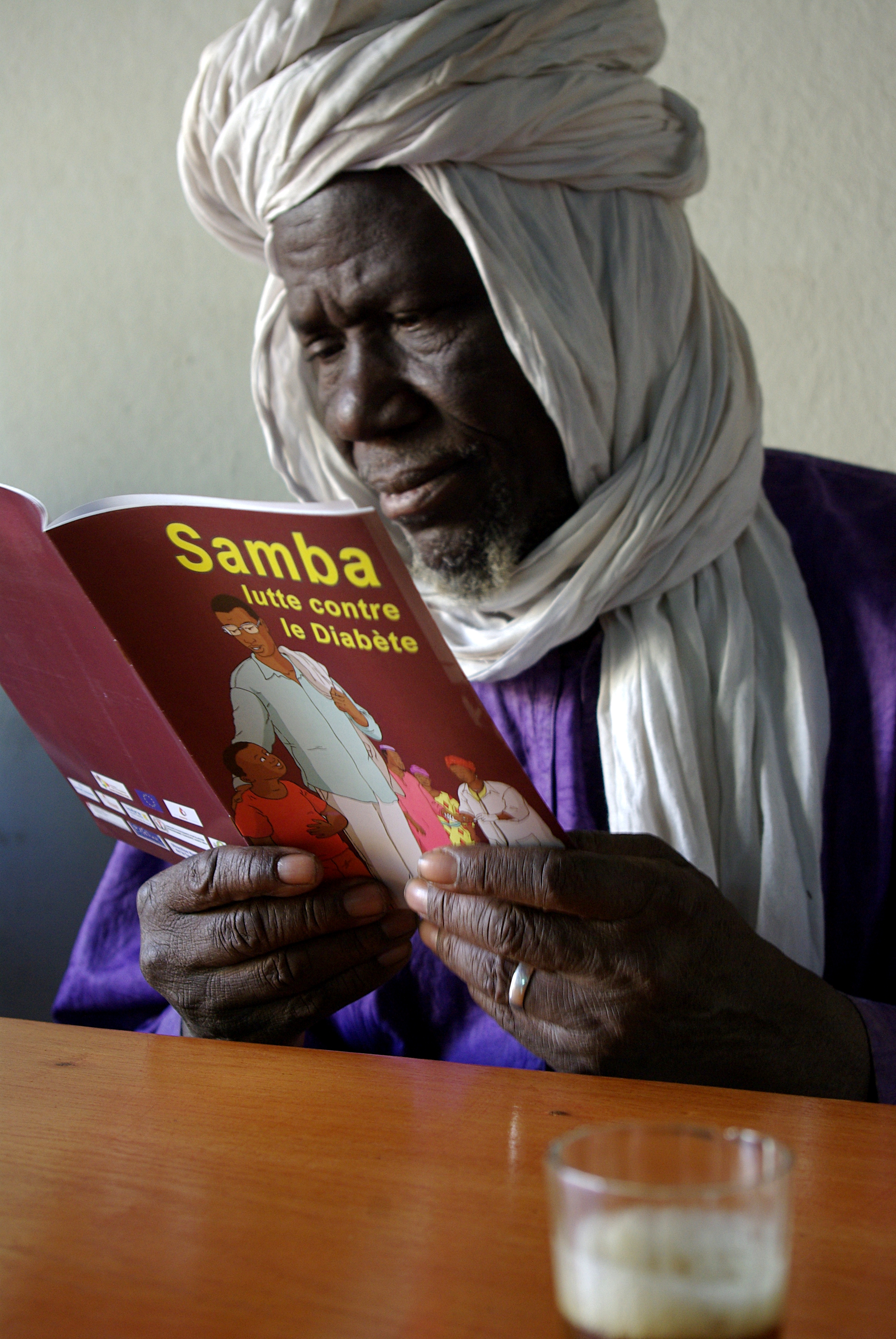
Diabetes information tools

Santé Diabète has 30 staff (data 2014) which is distributed among the various operational offices: Grenoble (France), Bamako (Mali), Ouagadougou (Burkina Faso) and Dakar (Senegal).

This team is working under the direction of a voluntary board of 12 members. This board includes people from different backgrounds and different nationalities (officials, doctors, professional of development, humanitarian, researchers, communications professionals, people with diabetes, academics, students, etc.) ensuring orientation of the organization.

Finally, in addition to these organs, Santé Diabète has a scientific advisory board of physicians and scientists of the highest levels from various specialties and different countries:

- Anthropology
- Development Economics
- Educational Sciences
- Epidemiology
- Health Economics
- Medicine
- Public Policy
- Sociology

== Partners ==
Field results and the pole of experts involved have gradually done the NGO Santé Diabète the structure of international reference for many international organizations with which the NGO has established close partnerships:

- International Diabetes Federation (IDF)
- World Health Organization (WHO)
- West African Health Organization (WAHO)
- Francophone Society of Diabetes (SFD)
- University of Montreal: Centre for Research on the nutritional transition (TRANSNUT)
- University Hospital of Grenoble (France)
- University Hospital of the Reunion Island (France)
- Geneva University (Switzerland)
- Association Française des Diabétiques (AFD)
- Association des Jeunes Diabétiques (AJD)
- International Insulin Foundation (IIF)
- World Diabetes Foundation (WDF)

== Publication and conferences ==
=== Books ===
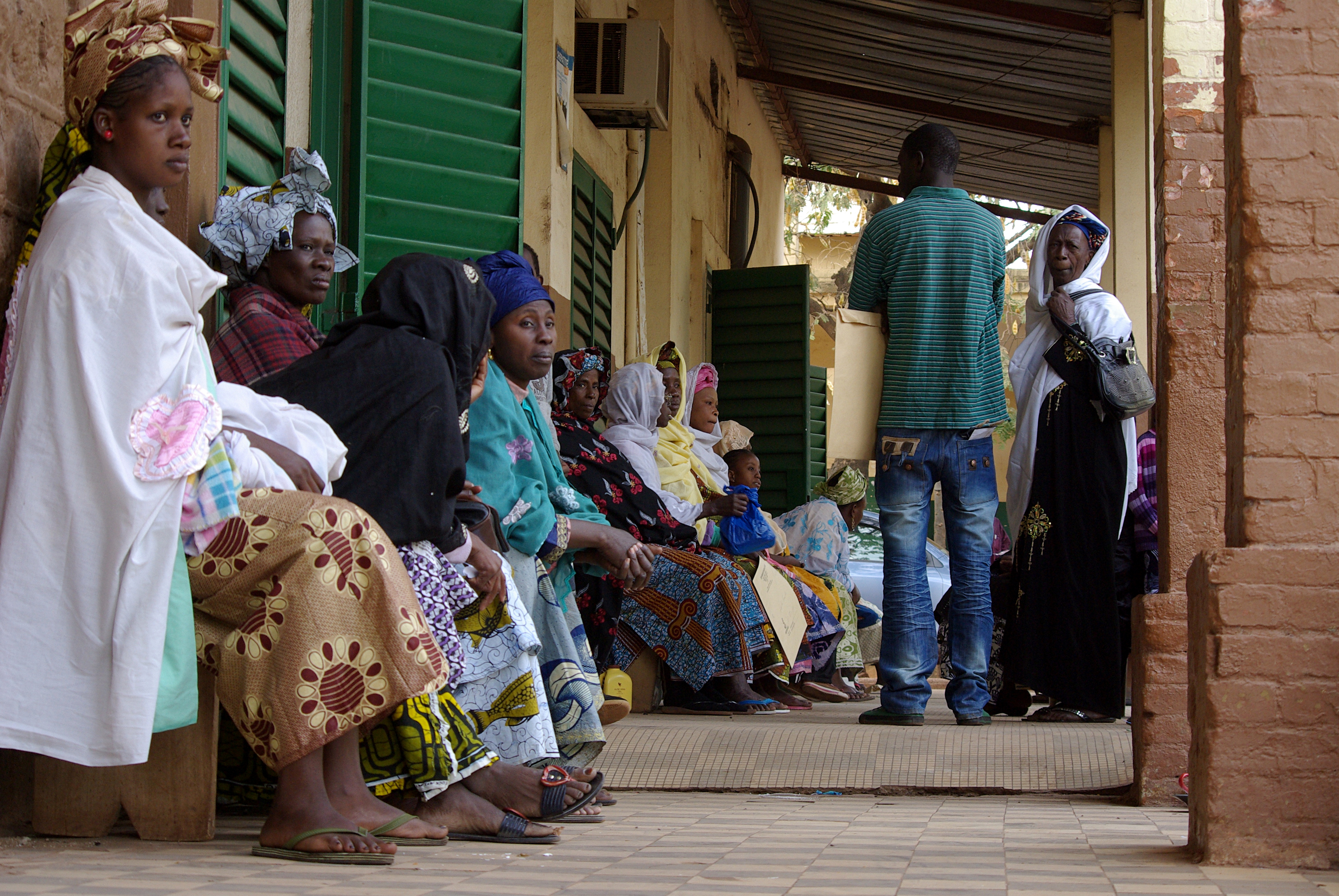
Diabetes consultation at hospital, Bamako

- Stéphane Besançon et Kaushik Ramaiya. Diabète Afrique. Edition ONG Santé Diabète, 2010, 80 pages.

=== Publications ===
- Betz Brown J, Ramaiya K, Besançon S, Rheeder P, Mapa Tassou C, Mbanya J.C, Kissimova-Skarbek K, Wangechi Njenga E, Wangui Muchemi E, Kiambuthi Wanjiru H, Schneide E. Use of Medical Services and Medicines Attributable to Diabetes in Sub-Saharan Africa, PLOS One, September 2014
- Besançon S, Beran D, Bouenizabila E. Accès à l'insuline dans les pays en voie de développement: une problématique complexe. Médecine des Maladies Métaboliques, April 2014
- Besançon S, Sidibé A, Traoré B, Amadou D, Djeugoue P, Coulon AL, Halimi S. Injecter de l’aide dans une région oubliée Diabetes Voice, Volume 59, March 2014
- Besançon S, Sidibé A. Le diabète : un enjeu de santé publique au Mali. Soins, N°781, December 2013
- Besançon S. Afrique et diabète: La fin d'un paradoxe. Diabète et Obésité, Volume 8, N° 72, October 2013
- Besançon S, Sidibé A.T. La société civile face à l'urgence du diabète au Mali. Diabetes Voice, Volume 57, July 2012
- Delisle H, Besançon S, Mbanya JC, Dushimimana A, Kapur A, Leitzmann C, Makoutodé M, Stover PJ. Empowering our profession in Africa. World Nutrition May 2012, 3, 6, 269-284
- Drabo J, Sidibé A, Halimi S, Besançon S. Une approche multipartenaire du développement de l'excellence dans la formation à la gestion du diabète dans quatre pays africains. Diabetes Voice, Volume 56, June 2011
- Debussche X, Balcou-Debussche M, Besançon S, Sidibé AT. Challenges to diabetes self-management in developing countries. Volume 54, Special Issue World diabetes congress, October 2009
- Besançon S, Sidibé AT, Nientao I. Décentralisation des soins du diabète au Mali, Un exemple de travail en réseau. Développement et Santé, July 2009
- Besançon S, Sidibé AT, Nientao I. Adaptation des recommandations pour la prise en charge du diabète en Afrique. Développement et Santé, July 2009
- Besançon S, Sidibé AT, Nientao I. Le diabète au Mali : aspects diététiques. Développement et Santé, July 2009
- Besançon S, Sidibé AT, Nientao I, Sow DS. Comment a été développé le programme de prévention et de prise en charge spécifique du pied diabétique au Mali ?. Développement et Santé, July 2009
- Beran D, Besançon S, Sidibé AT. Le diabète un nouvel enjeu de santé publique pour les pays en voie de développement : l’exemple du Mali. Médecine des maladies Métaboliques, March 2007
- Besançon S. L’Association Malienne de Lutte contre le Diabète. Diabetes Voice, Volume 51 Numéro 3, September 2006
- Beran D, Besançon S. Report of the International Insulin Foundation on the assessment protocol for insulin access in Mali, December 2004

=== Conferences ===
- Symposium international de Libreville sur le diabète (2014). Besançon S. “Apport des pairs éducateurs dans l’éducation thérapeutique des patients diabétiques au Mali”. Libreville, Gabon, 6 et 7 juin 2014
- Médecins Sans Frontière (MSF) International Diabetes Workshop (2014). Besançon S. “Management of diabetes in emergency contexts: a case study from Mali”. Genève, Suisse, 3 et 4 juin 2014
- Médecins Sans Frontière (MSF) International Diabetes Workshop (2014). Besançon S. “Advocacy and International network on diabetes management in Africa”. Genève, Suisse, 3 et 4 juin 2014
- 2nd African Diabetes Summit (2014). Besançon S., Diabetes in war and conflicts. Yaounde, Cameroun, February 25 to 28, 2014
- World Diabetes Congress (2013). Besançon S. "Peer educators structured educational intervention in type 2 diabetes - a randomised controlled trial in Mali". Melbourne, Australia, 2 au 6 décembre 2013
- Symposium international de Libreville sur le diabète (2013). Besançon S. Accès au traitement pour le diabète: problématique médico-économique et logistique. Libreville, Gabon, 7 et 8 juin 2013
- Congress of the French speaking society of diabetes (2013). Besançon S. Diabetes Africa : the end of a paradox. Montpellier international congress center. Montpellier, France, March 28, 2013
- Regional Forum on NCDs : "Integrated and evidence-informed approaches to tackling NCDs in the West African Sub-Region". Besançon S. Development of prevention and management of diabetes in Mali. West African Health Organization (WAHO). Ouagadougou, Burkina Faso, 20–21 November 2012,
- The African Diabetes Congress (1st Scientific Sessions). Besançon S. Role of nutrition in the prevention and management of diabetes : research and programs developed in Mali. Arusha International Congress Center. Arusha, Tanzania, 25 – 28 July 2012.
- Symposium international de Libreville sur le diabète en Afrique. Besançon S. Méthodologie développée pour décentraliser les soins pour le diabète au Mali. Libreville, Gabon, 1er et 2 juin 2012
- Geneva Health Forum 2012. Besançon. S. State-NGO Partnership to Improve the Prevention and Management of Diabetes in Mali? Geneva (Suisse), April, 18–20 April 2012.
- Expert Meeting on Indigenous Peoples, Diabetes and Development. Besançon S. Diabetes Education & Nutrition in Mali, Improving Care Amongst the Tuareg Population. Copenhaguen, Danemark, 01 and 2 March 2012
- Therapeutic Patient Education: Issues and Perspectives. Besançon S. Developing the therapeutic education with limited resources: what Challenges ? The example of Mali. La Reunion, France, 24 février 2012
- Sommet Africain Francophone du Diabète (SAFDIA). Besançon S. Sidibe AT. Décentralisation des soins pour le diabète, l’example du Mali. Brazzaville, Congo, 27 au 29 octobre 2011
- Sustainability Leadership Programme – Cambridges university. Besançon S. Access to health and especially to drugs for diabetic patients, what perspective for the NGO Santé Diabète ? Copenhagen, Denmark, Wednesday 28th – Friday 30 September 2011
- Séminaires du centre collaborateur OMS sur la transition nutritionnelle et le développement (TRANSNUT). Besançon S. Développement : des actions de recherches pour soutenir les activités de terrain et celles de plaidoyer. Centre TRANSNUT. Département de nutrition, Faculté de médecine Université de Montréal - 18 mai 2011
- WHO African Region Ministerial Consultation on Non communicable Diseases. Besançon S., Collaboration State - NGO to improve prevention and management of diabetes in Mali. Brazzaville, Congo, 4–6 April 2011
- Diabetes Leadership Forum Africa 2010. Besançon. S, Traore. N. M. Leveraging multi-stakeholder engagement in diabetes care. Johannesburg (Afrique du Sud), 30 septembre – 01 octobre 2010
- Social and Economic Impact of Diabetes International Expert Summit. Besançon. S. Panel expert: Economic impact of diabetes in Africa. Pékin (Chine), 13-14 novembre 2010.
- World Diabetes Congress. Nientao. I. Besançon. S. IDF Study on the Economic and Social Impact of Diabetes in Mali. Montréal (Canada), October 2009
- African Diabetes Congress. Besançon. S. Sidibe.A. Nientao. I. Nutritional management of diabetes in Africa a new hope. Nairobie (Kenya), 2007
- World Diabetes Congress. Besançon. S. Sidibe.A. T. Nientao. I. Nutritional management of diabetes in Africa the example of Mali. Cape Town (Afrique du sud), 2006
- Symposium International sur le diabète. Besançon.S. How was the program developed « Towards an improved coverage of Diabetes Mellitus in Mali ». Manilles (Philippines). Avril 2006
