= Trident Media Guard =

- Company type: S.A.
- Founded: 2002
- Headquarters: Saint-Sébastien-sur-Loire, France
- Key people: Alain Guislain (CEO)
- Number of employees: 40
- Website: https://tmg.eu/

Trident Media Guard (TMG) is a French company that specializes in software to prevent unauthorized copying of files over the Internet. Founded in 2002 by Alain Guislain and Bastien Casalta, it is located in Saint-Sébastien-sur-Loire near Nantes.

It aims to "provide services to major publishing companies of the recording and film industry to stop the loss of revenue due to illegal downloads on peer-to-peer networks." When it was created, it benefited from the incubator functions of Atlanpole, and a significant subscription from the Rennes venture capitalist Ouest Venture. Thierry Lhermitte entered the capital in June 2009 and is a director.

It was selected in late January 2010, by the music and film industry to address copyright infringements on the Internet as part of the HADOPI law. In this context, it will aim to identify the IP addresses of users making illegal downloading, and then send that information to HADOPI.

Also, it also works with other companies (Canal Plus, LFP, France Télévisions), in order to fight against the streaming retransmission of illegal streams during various sporting events.

Trident Media Guard and Thierry Lhermitte jointly received the Special Mention prize Orwell Internet at Big Brother Awards 2010.

On May 13, 2011, Bluetouff, on the Reflets.info site, revealed the existence of an unprotected company server that leaked personal data as well as scripts for processing this data. This incident earned him a triple audit (CNIL, HADOPI and HSC, mandated by the rights holders) and a cut in the interconnection used to communicate the IP addresses of downloaders to HADOPI. The conclusions of these audits will never be made public, only those of Bluetouff will be after it has presented its conclusions to the HADOPI rights protection commission.

== See also ==
- HADOPI law
- Peer Media Technologies
