= Michel Étiévent =

French journalist, historian and writer

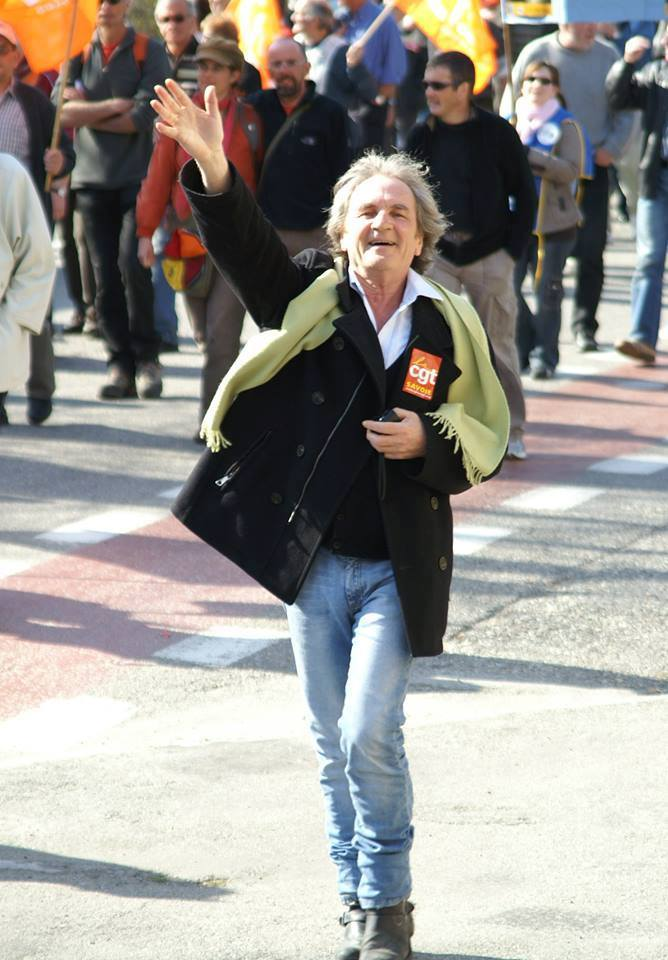
- Born: 10 July 1947
- Died: 12 October 2021 (aged 74)
- Occupations: Journalist, historian and writer

Michel Étiévent (10 July 1947 – 12 October 2021) was a French journalist, historian and writer.

== Career ==
Étiévent created collective writing projects linked to universities, schools, hospitals, and jails, with support of the French Ministries of Education Culture, Justice and Health. He directed formation stages about the theme of writing, with professors, psychologists and educators.

He worked under Ambroise Croizat, the Minister of Trade under Charles de Gaulle's government (1945–1947), and wrote two biographies.

In October 2013, with Annie Lacroix-Riz, he was boycotted at a colloquium about Ambroise Croizat organized by the Mairie de Paris. They received the support of the M'PEP.

== Books ==
- Ambroise Croizat, ou L'invention sociale : suivi de lettres de prisons, 1939–1941, Gap, La Ravoire, 1999.
- Guy Môquet, J'aurais voulu vivre..., Gap, 2007.
- Marcel Paul, Ambroise Croizat : chemins croisés d'innovation sociale, Gap, Challes-les-Eaux, 2008.
- With Pierre Assouline, Marieke Aucante, Malika Bey-Durif, Anne Bihan, Jean-Noel Blanc, Olivia Cattan, Noelle Chatelet, Régine Detambel, Sylvie Fabre, Ali Fekih, Alain Freixe, Jean-Paul Gavard, Albane Gelle, Sylvie Germain, Sophie Girardeau, Patrick Grainville, Michel Layaz, Philippe Lefait, Françoise Lefevre, Elisabeth Motsch, Catherine Neykov, Pia Petersen, Arnauld Pontier, Patrick Ravella, Monique Romagny, Danièle Saint-Bois, and Jean-louis Serrano, Au nom de la fragilité. Des mots d'écrivains..
- Émilie au bout de la nuit. Vies d'une paysanne savoyarde ouvrière et résistante, Gap, 2021.

== Filmography ==
- De mémoires d'ouvriers, 2011.
