= Robert Dun =

French writer (1920–2002)

Robert Dun, whose real name is Maurice Martin (1920 - 8 March 2002) was a French self-taught writer, supporter of European nationalism and neo-paganism, and an SS officer.

== Biography ==
An admirer of Nietzsche, Dun wrote many books which deal with many a topic such as philosophy, religion and mythology.

In his early years, he was a communist activist. He then became an anarchist, volunteering in the International Brigades, before changing sides and enlisting in the Frankreich Brigade and later in the 33rd Waffen Grenadier Division of the SS Charlemagne. When he came back to France, he was sentenced (in 1948 in Lyon) to one year of jail for his commitment. About this period of his life, he will later on disavow the leader principle without ever renouncing racialism: "So hang on to your French, European and White conscience and be if you can a part of our race, of our blood, of our soul that shall live on when all around us will fall apart".

A pioneer of ecology in France with his periodical L'Or Vert (The Green Gold), he also wrote in identitarian publications such as the extreme right Réfléchir & Agir to condemn modern society drawing inspiration from neoheathenism, ecology, myths and traditions. He furthermore created the "Europo", a language that he hoped could be used for European integration.

His intellectual commitment was always followed by action (gatherings, letters, lectures etc.) which were aimed in particular at the youth which he called the "Werewolves". Thus named, they form a voluntarily flattering metaphoric representation of barbaric violence borrowed from folklore.

== Bibliography ==
- Les Confidences d'un Loup-Garou
- Le Message du Verseau
- Nietzsche (Frédéric), Ainsi parlait Zarathoustra
- Manifeste de l'Art sacerdotal et le Rosier sur la cendre
- Le Grand Suicide
- BOJORIX, Woher ? Wohin ? Wozu ? Antworten an die heutige Sphynx
- Liberté, Vérité, Santé ou les Catacombes de la Libre Pensée
- L'Âme Européenne
- Neues Licht über « Also sprach Zarathoustra »
- Vers l'Europe retrouvée ou la mort !
- Une vie de combat, Cartouches intellectuelles
- Lo Sage om Vanda og Romuald

== See also ==
- National Anarchism
