= Claude Rifat =

French biologist

Claude Rifat (1 March 1952, Cairo - July 31, 2002) was a French biologist, psychonaut, political activist, writer, and researcher. His accomplishments include some early research into GHB, including the thymoanaleptic and sociabilising effects of this molecule. He is credited with providing the first live plant material and seeds of Mitragyna speciosa outside Thailand, including several bioassays. This material is the source of the vast majority of Kratom plants currently available outside Thailand. He has been one of the best bamboos specialist in the last years. He has introduced more than 100 different species, forms and varieties of bamboos from different countries in the world. He has written a book about the contrasts between English and French people in Quebec.
