= Agora Fidelio =

French music group

- Origin: Toulouse, Occitania, France
- Genres: Post rock, alternative rock
- Years active: 2000–2012
- Labels: Jerkov
- Members: Matthieu Miègeville; Julien Rouche; Stéphane Bezzina; Pierre-Marie Lesouple
- Past members: Akira
- Website: http://www.agorafidelio.com/

Agora Fidelio was a French alternative rock band (sometimes referred to as post rock).

== History ==
The band was formed in the late 1990s in the form of side-project of Psykup. The band interprets simple acoustic covers.

After some changes, the line up is stabilized in 2002. Mathieu MIEGEVILLE, vocals, is no longer the only member of the initial training. He also officiates since 2007 in My Own Private Alaska, a piano trio / battery / screams. Mathieu Sainty, said Akira, who takes the bass, was also a member of the Seaside Group. Julian Rouche, guitar, is a founding member of the Naive group, which released his first album in June 2009. He is also the only member of the electro Status Phantom project.

In 2002, the band released their first album Une histoire de chair.

The second album Altitude Zéro, was released in 2004.

The third album, Le troisième choix, was initially scheduled for February 2006, but was released 10 months later, in November 2006. To ward off the spell, the group released a 4 track EP called Finir à Paris. This EP offers two pieces of the future album, two remixes from Altitude Zero, and clip Finish in Paris.

In early 2007, Akira decided to leave band. He was replaced by Stéphane Bezzina (called Pelo and current bassist Psykup).

The band's fourth album Les Illusions d'une Route was structured as a triple album triptych. The first issue Barcelone (lit. 'Barcelona'), was released in 2010, and the second issue Bagdad (lit. 'Baghdad') in 2012.

The band name has no special meaning. This is the concatenation of Agora is the name of the former studio of Psykup, Agora (managed by Yannick Tournier, former Psykup), who was also a place of life and meetings, and Fidelio, which is the Password orgiastic evening in the film Eyes Wide Shut (originally the name of the only opera Beethoven).

== Members ==
- Matthieu Miègeville (aka MiLKa) : Vocals, (Also vocalist of Psykup and My Own Private Alaska)
- Julien Rouche (aka Jouch) : Guitar (Also singer and guitarist of Naïve)
- Stéphane Bezzina (aka Pelo) : Bass (Substitute of Akira, since February 2007) - Pelo also is bass in Psykup
- Pierre-Marie Lesouple (aka Pim) : Drums

== Discography ==
- Une histoire de chair (2002)
- Altitude Zéro (2004)
- Finir à Paris (EP) (2006)
- Le troisième choix (2006)
- Les Illusions d'une Route : Barcelone (2010)
- Les Illusions d'une Route : Bagdad (2012)
