= Dominique Mouillot =

French businesswoman

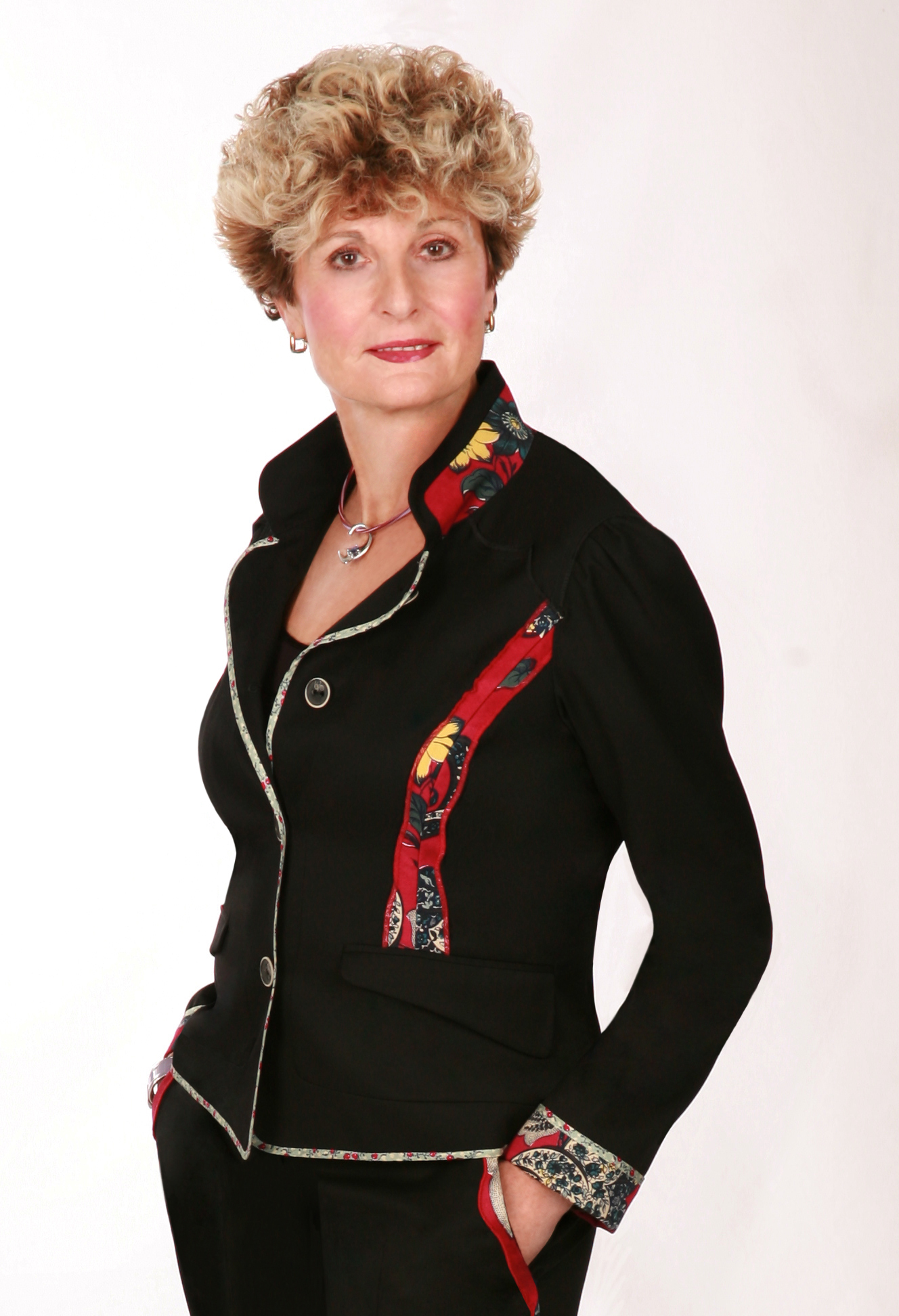

Personal details
- Born: 15 February 1952 (age 74) Paris
- Education: École nationale supérieure d'ingénieurs de Caen (National Graduate School of Engineering & Research Centre)

Dominique Mouillot (born 15 February 1952 in Paris), is a French business leader.

Married with one child, Dominique Mouillot has a passion for horse riding in competitions, with a speciality in dressage. She is now at the national level of "Amateur Elite" and is the 2011 "Amateur Elite" PACA Champion.

== Biography ==
After completing preparatory classes for the French Grandes Ecoles specialized in higher maths and special maths at the Lycée Saint Louis in Paris, she joined the École nationale supérieure d'ingénieurs de Caen (National Graduate School of Engineering in Caen) and graduated with an engineering degree in 1975.

She began her professional career as a Research Engineer at the CEA where she produced numerous works classified as Confidentiel Défense and Secret défense.

From 1979 to 1996, she held successive positions of Product Manager as well as Sales and Marketing Director, in French and in foreign companies (American, German) in the field of nuclear engineering and systems of nuclear measures for the safety of facilities, workers and populations.

== Onet Technologies ==
In 1996, she joined the Onet group to take the Chair of Onet Technologies (now €240 million - 2,400 employees). She has significantly developed the technological added value of its activities, and multiplied the turnover by more than eight with only €15 million of external growth (the acquisition of COMEX NUCLEAIRE in 1999).

In April 2011, she created COMIA a Joint Venture with MHI (MITSUBISHI HEAVY INDUSTRIES Ltd) and Onet Technologies India with an Indian partner PCI Ltd (PRIME GROUP), now 70% owned by Onet Technologies and 30% by PCI.

== Nominations and awards ==
- 2008 Trophy for Women Corporate Leaders in the field of "New Professions and Innovation"
- 2009 Foreign trade advisor in France for a period of three years (PACA Corsica). In July 2011, she was elected President of the Provence Alps Corsica Regional Committee for Foreign Trade Advisors in France.

== Honours ==
By decree of the President of the Republic dated 15 May 2009, she was raised to the Class of Chevalier (Knight) in the Ordre national du Mérite(National Order of Merit).

By decree of the President of the Republic dated 30 December 2011, she was appointed to the Class of Chevalier (Knight) in the Ordre de la Légion d'Honneur(Order of the Legion of Honour).

== Other activities ==
- 27 June 2012 Election as a member of the Board of Directors at Syntec Engineering.
- July 2010 Integration onto the Board of Directors of the French Atomic Forum to the unanimity of its members.
- September 2010, Elected "Corporate Member" of the European Nuclear Society
- March 2011, she took part in the creation and launch of the international business network UCCCAB (the Union of Chambers of Commerce and Bilateral Business Clubs)
- July 2011: She was appointed Member of the Strategic Committee of the Nuclear Establishment (launched by the Minister Eric BESSON, Mr. Henri PROGLIO, Chairman of EDF and Mr. Luc OURSEL, Chairman of AREVA).

=== Women In Nuclear ===
WIN aims to promote careers and professions in nuclear, to facilitate access to a first job and help develop diversity in the nuclear industry in the broadest possible sense. As a woman and the Chair of WIN France and the Founding Chief Executive of Win Europe (association Loi 1901) (Voluntary non-profit association, governed by the 1901Waldeck-Rouddeau Act) with 10 other member countries / international organizations (Bulgaria, Finland, Germany, Hungary, IAEA, Romania, Slovenia, Spain, Sweden et Switzerland), she is involved in promoting nuclear professions among young people and especially young students.

=== Fem Energia Award ===
Ms. Mouillot created the Fem'Energia Award in partnership with EDF, to attract skills towards technical and technological professions in this sector. The first and second editions of the prize-giving were under the patronage of the Ministers Christine LAGARDE and Valérie PECRESSE. The 2011 Edition, was under the patronage of the Ministers François BAROIN and Laurent WAUQUIEZ. For the 2011 edition, a category "Women working in Europe" was created.

=== Les Elles de l'économie (Women in the Economy) ===
In 2010, she became Chair of the first edition of "Women in the Economy". Her ambition was to honour the commitment and success of women in the region's economic world, and women leaders invested at a high level of responsibility in companies in order to reward their hard work and perseverance in a predominantly male world.
