= Gérard Le Cam =

French politician (born 1954)

Gérard Le Cam (born 24 February 1954, in Côtes-d'Armor) is a former member of the Senate of France, who represented the Côtes-d'Armor department from 1998 to 2014. He is a member of the Communist, Republican, and Citizen Group.

== Biography ==
The son of farmers, he enrolled at the École normale d'instituteurs (teacher training college) in Saint-Brieuc and became a technology teacher in Plénée-Jugon in 1981. Elected deputy mayor of the town in 1983, he became vice-president of the Arguenon-Hunaudaye Community of Municipalities in 1995.

On September 27, 1998, he was elected senator for the Côtes-d'Armor department. He became mayor of Plénée-Jugon following the municipal elections in March 2008, was re-elected to the Senate on September 21, 2008, and is vice-chair of the Economic Affairs Committee.

After considering presenting his list in the September 2014 senatorial elections, while affirming his party's "willingness to support the emergence of a broad coalition on the left ," he withdrew in favor of a socialist-communist coalition list with a second place reserved for one of his party members, Christine Prunaud, as he had wished.

He also sits on the committee, the federal bureau, and the national environment commission of the French Communist Party.

Gérard Le Cam is married and has two children.
