= Danyel Waro, fyer bâtard =

- Directed by: Thierry Hoarau
- Screenplay by: Thierry Hoarau
- Produced by: Imago Productions
- Starring: Danyel Waro
- Cinematography: Thierry Hoarau
- Edited by: Véronique Sanson
- Music by: Danyel Waro
- Release date: 2002
- Running time: 54 minutes
- Countries: France; Réunion

Danyel Waro, fyer bâtard (in English, Danyel Waro, the Proud Bastard) is a 2002 documentary film.

== Synopsis ==
In Réunion, there's no need to introduce Danyèl Waro, his rhythms and texts have left their mark on the cultural landscape of the past twenty years. Behind the public image, the singer, there's a man with strong convictions, a poet, a craftsman. Unknown facets that Thierry Hoarau's film reveals. An intimate portrait of a strong, appealing personality.
