= Jean-Michel Gaillard =

Jean-Michel Gaillard (May 16, 1946, Pont-Sant-Esprit in Gard, France – July 19, 2005, Paris, France) was a high-ranking French official. He was, most notably, director general of Antenne 2 (now France 2), from 1989 to 1991.

== Biography ==
Gaillard was a student of the École normale supérieure de Saint-Cloud, where he received a doctorate in history. As a politician he was a militant socialist, aligned with the likes of François Hollande and Ségolène Royal. He was father to two girls.

Before his death from cancer at the age of 59, Gaillard was counsel for the Academy of Television Arts. During the presidency of François Mitterrand, he worked as a senior advisor at the Élysée Palace. As a television script writer he co-wrote the television film Leclerc, a Dream of Indochina with Nicolas Sarkozy, which debuted on France 3 in 2003.

Gaillard wrote many works, including a biography of Jules Ferry, published in 1989.

== Bibliography ==
- Tu seras président mon fils : anatomie des grandes écoles et malformations des élites. - Ramsay, 1987. - 248 p.; 24 cm. - ISBN 2-85956-565-5
- L'ENA : miroir de l'État de 1945 à nos jours. - Complexe, 1995. - 238 p.; 22 cm. - ISBN 2-87027-563-3
- Les 40 jours de Blum. - Perrin, 2001. - 316 p.-4 pl.; 23 cm. - ISBN 2-262-01731-X
- Les Grands jours de l'Europe : 1950-2004. - Perrin, 2004. - 139 p.; 18 cm. - (Tempus; 59). - ISBN 2-262-02169-4

== TV films ==
- Le Dernier été, based on Georges Mandel by Nicolas Sarkozy.
- Thérèse et Léon, following part of the life of Léon Blum.
