= Gilles Gaetner =

French journalist and author (born 1946)

Gilles Gaetner (born 11 January 1946 in Paris) is a French journalist and the author of several books. He became a journalist at L'Express in 1992.
