= Jean Hélène =

French journalist

Jean Hélène (8 August 1953 in Mulhouse – 21 October 2003) was a French journalist specializing in Africa. He was working for Radio France Internationale in Ivory Coast when he was killed in Abidjan by police Sergeant Théodore Séry Dago. Jean Hélène was his press name, Christian Baldensberger being his real name.

== Media coverage analysis in Rwanda ==
During the initial months of the 1994 Rwandan genocide, international media coverage, including reports by Jean Hélène for Le Monde, faced severe challenges in capturing the systematic nature of the massacres due to extreme chaos and communication blackouts.

A May 1999 French court ruling reviewed this early coverage, noting that during the first two months of the conflict, Le Monde—through its correspondent Jean Hélène—highlighted the "civil war" aspect of the conflict rather than the systematic genocide. Historians analyzing the media landscape of the period point out that his early reports maintained a "relative symmetry" (relative symétrie) between the government forces and the RPF, reflecting the structural difficulties of field journalism before the full scale of the tragedy became clear, rather than an intentional political bias.

== Murder and Trial ==
On 21 October 2003, in a prevailing atmosphere of rabid anti-French sentiment during the civil war in Côte d'Ivoire, Hélène had gone to the Abidjan police headquarters to interview some government opponents who had just been released from detention. Apparently he had an altercation with Sergeant Dago over parking, following which Dago went inside, grabbed an AK-47 and shot him dead as he was walking from his car, talking on his mobile phone.

Sergeant Dago was immediately arrested and apparently confessed to the crime. Subsequently, however, he changed his position claiming that he had come inside the building after talking to Helene when he heard the shots that killed him.

There was wide international condemnation of the event. Amnesty international said:

The fact that a sergeant can kill a journalist who posed no threat to him in cold blood shows the atmosphere of impunity in which Côte d'Ivoire security forces have been operating.

After the event, Théodore Séry Dago became a hero and a Dago support committee was formed. In January 2004, a military court under judge Ahmed Lanzéni Coulibaly considered ballistic evidence which indicated that the bullet had been shot from Dago's service weapon, and found him guilty of having "deliberately killed" Helene. Dago was sentenced to 17 years in prison.
