= Henri Guédon =

Martiniquais musician

Henri Guédon (born May 22, 1944, in Fort de France in Martinique - died on February 12, 2006, in Paris, France after heart surgery) was a French percussionist from Martinique. His first band was called La Contesta and he organised it when he was 20. He was awarded a Maracas d'or the first year the awards ran. In 1983, Philippe Langlais invited him to compose a mix of classical and jazz with his orchestra, the resulting composition called Opéra Triangulaire. He was a judo champion 1963-65. Multiple albums fused Antillean rhythms with other music from around the world. Guedon was instrumental in exporting the new sound of 60s and 70s Latin -guaguanco, boogaloo, salsa, descarga - to France and the rest of Europe. When Guedon began placing his percussion instruments at the front of the stage in the style of his great influence Ray Barretto, French audience members found themselves shocked and intrigued. Soon enough, greats like El Conde and Pacheco were touring France. Were it not for Henri Guedon, Europe could have conceivably taken years to move forward from mambo and cha-cha-cha.

== Discography ==
- Zouk Experience Percussion Des Antilles (Epic, 1977)
- Afro Blue (Le Chant Du Monde 1982)
- Afro Temple (Le Chant Du Monde 1984)
- Nomadisme Musical Aux Caraibes (Bleu Caraibe, 1992)

== Bibliography ==
(incomplete)

- De l'onomatopée créole à la percussion (with Mauricette Catillon)
- Écoute les Antilles (Armand 1984)
- Percussions (Alphones Le Duc 1984)
