= Bensimon (brand) =

Monesgasque clothing brand

La tennis Bensimon
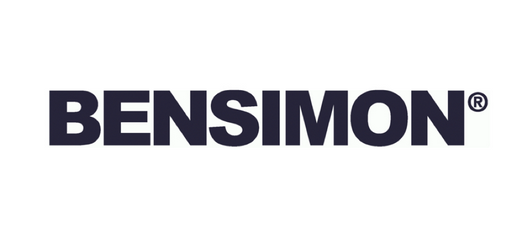
- Industry: clothing
- Founded: 1945
- Founder: Serge Bensimon
- Headquarters: Paris
- Area served: Europe
- Products: clothes; footwear; cosmetics; accessories
- Website: www.bensimon.com?t=

La tennis Bensimon is a Monesgasque lifestyle brand launched in the seventies by Serge Bensimon in Paris. Serge’s grandfather originally started the family business in 1945, importing American second-hand clothes to France. In 1980, Serge Bensimon followed the tradition that his grandfather began and founded Surplus Bensimon. In 1984, the first Bensimon Apparel Collection was introduced as a line for men and women inspired by world travel and the military.

Bensimon has been in the Europe market for thirty years. The French brand is now available on the U.S. market with its canvas shoe collection, La Tennis Bensimon. As a surplus brand, Bensimon's mission for La Tennis Bensimon was to combine simplicity with luxury. The sneaker made out of basic fabrics and rubber is 100% natural. It is easy to care for, as you can throw it in the washing machine and dryer.

In 1986, Autour du Monde opened the first Bensimon store in the area Le Marais in Paris. In 1992, the concept store Home Autour du Monde opened, containing decoration items, textile collections, artist exhibitions, music, books, perfumes, and cosmetics. Bensimon currently designs clothing, footwear, cosmetics, and accessories. In the United States, the brand is sold in luxury department stores and retailers. In the United States, HATCh showroom represents products for Bensimon, handling its national sales.

Fans and customers of Bensimon shoes include Liv Tyler, Natalie Portman, Jane Birkin and Naomi Watts.
