= François Lamoureux =

François Lamoureux (17 December 1946 – 26 August 2006) was a French civil servant who worked on European integration as part of the Delors Commission.

== Career ==
Educated at the Lycée Buffon and the Institut d'Etudes Politiques de Paris, Lamoureux began his professional career in the legal service of the European Commission in 1978. He was recruited by Commission Secretary-General Emile Noël to join the cabinet (personal staff) of Jacques Delors in 1985. As deputy director of the Commission President's cabinet, he played a central role in advancing European integration, working on the Single European Act and the Maastricht Treaty.

After a short period in Paris as director of the Cabinet of Prime Minister Édith Cresson, he returned to the Commission in Brussels. After a period working on the enlargement of the EU to include the countries of Central and Eastern Europe, he became Directorate-General for Transport and Energy of the European Commission in 1999, working closely with Commissioner Loyola de Palacio.

He died of cancer in the summer of 2006. According to the wishes of his widow, Christine Lamoureux, his archives are deposited at the Historical Archives of the European Union in Florence.
