= Irène Skorik =

Irène Skorik (born Beaudemont; 27 January 1924 or 1928 – 28 July 2006) was a French ballet dancer, actress and composer. She made her debut with the ballet recital at the Théâtre Sarah-Bernhardt in 1944 and danced with the Ballet des Champs Elysées from 1945 to 1950. Skorik also danced with the Munich State Opera Ballet, the Berlin State Ballet, Basel Opera, Ballett Zürich and the Dutch National Ballet. She was also a television actress, a theatre actress and a composer as well as a music professor.

== Early life ==
Skorik was born Irène Beaudemont in the 10th arrondissement of Paris, France on 27 January in either 1924 or 1928. She was the daughter of the Russian-born Alexandra Beaudemont (née Skorik) and the French bank clerk René Baudemont. Skorik was educated at Ecole communale de Courbevoie, Lycée Racine and Conservatoire Russe de Musique, Paris, under the tutelage of Boris Kniaseff, Lyubov Egorova, Olga Preobrazhenskaya, Victor Gsovsky and Carlotta Zambelli.

== Career ==
She made her debut with the ballet recital at the Théâtre Sarah-Bernhardt in 1944. Skorik became a dancer with the Ballet des Champs Elysées in 1945, and was promoted to principal dancer in 1946 and continued in the role until 1950, also dancing with the Nouveau Ballet de Monte Carlo. She created the role of Serge Lifar's Chota Rostaveli in 1946. Skorik suffered a nervous breakdown following the end of a run at Winter Garden Theatre in July 1947, and danced in Les Sylphides at Alexandra Palace broadcast on BBC Television in February 1949. Starting in 1950, she pursued an international career, but withdrew from a tour of Australia on doctor's orders due to illness. In 1951, Skorik joined the Munich State Opera Ballet, Germany and remained there until 1952. She appeared on the 1953 BBC programme Ballet for Beginners.

She went on to be a guest artist with various theatres and companies in France and abroad, including the opera houses of Berlin, Basel from 1961 to 1962, Rome in 1968, Zurich, the Ballets de Paris from 1957 to 1959, the small French company Ballets 1958, and with the Dutch National Ballet between 1959 and 1960. Skorik danced in Bacchus and Ariadne, Daphnis et Chloé, The Stone Flower, Giselle, Victor Gsovsky's Hamlet in 1950, Josephs Legende in 1951, Cinderella in 1951, Chemin de la lumière in 1952, Tatjana Gsovsky's Fleurenville in 1956, Orlikowsky's revival of The Prince of the Pagodas in 1961, Gsovsky's Études in 1961, The Stone Flower in 1962, Abraxas in 1963, Peer Gynt in 1964, Le Bourgeois gentilhomme in 1966, A Streetcar Named Desire in Germany in 1973, Le Prince des Pagodes and La Fleur de Pierre (ballets), as well as William Tell in 1987. She performed with the London Festival Ballet in 1963 and participated in the Nervi International Ballet Festival, Italy in 1970.

In 1961, Skorik made her debut as a television actress in Munich, Germany and debuted as a theatre actress in Paris in 1966. She worked as an actress in television films from 1960 to 1987 and in theatre in 1983, having been a composer between 1979 and 1982. From 1970 to 1989, Skorik was a professor at the Paris Académie Internationale de Danse and at the municipal conservatory of the 9th arrondissement of Paris between 1983 and 1989. She became a member of the SACEM in 1979.

== Death ==
Skorik died on 28 July 2006.
