= Operation Bretagne =

- Part of First Indochina War
Date	1 December 1952 – 4 January 1953
Location	South of the Red River, between Nam Định and the sea
Result	French Union victory

Belligerents
French Union: France; French Indochina; State of Vietnam	Democratic Republic of Vietnam: (North Vietnam) Việt Minh

Commanders and leaders
General de Berchoux; Colonel de Monclard	Võ Nguyên Giáp

Strength
4 Mobile Groups; 2 Amphibian Sub-Group	9th Regiment (Division 304); 48th Regiment (Division 320)

Casualties and losses
Unknown	Unknown

Operation Bretagne was a French Union military operation between 1 December 1952 and 4 January 1953, during the First Indochina War.

Four Mobile Groups (Groupes Mobiles, GM) and General de Berchoux's two Amphibian Sub-Groups hunted and engaged the 9th Regiment (304th Division) and the 48th Regiment (320th Division) of the Viet Minh, who were threatening the bishopric of Bui Chu, in Nam Định province. Defeated, the Việt Minh split in small groups, disguised themselves with peasant clothes and escaped to the south.
