= Pierre Chanal =

French soldier and suspected serial killer (1946-2003)

- Born: 18 November 1946; Saint-Étienne, France
- Died: 15 October 2003 (aged 56); Reims, France
- Cause of death: Suicide by Exsanguination
- Convictions: Kidnapping and rape

Details
- Victims: 8–17
- Span of crimes: 1980–1988
- Country: France
- State: Champagne-Ardenne
- Date apprehended: 9 August 1988

Pierre Chanal ([pjɛʁ ʃanal]; 18 November 1946 – 15 October 2003) was a French soldier and suspected serial killer. He was convicted of the rape and kidnapping of a young man, Balázs Falvay, whom he picked up hitchhiking in 1988. He received a ten-year sentence for the attack and was released in 1995 on probation. He was accused of murdering three of eight young men who disappeared in northeastern France between 1980 and 1987. One of his alleged victims was Trevor O'Keeffe. Chanal killed himself in prison in 2003 while on trial.

== Biography ==
Pierre Chanal was chief warrant officer and instructor at camp de Mourmelon in the 4th dragoon regiment in Marne, from 1977 to 1986, the time of the Mourmelon disappearances. He had an impeccable service record. He jogged 15 kilometres (9.3 mi) daily, was trained in hand-to-hand combat and was a skydiving enthusiast. He earned a United Nations medal for his service as a UN peacekeeper in Lebanon. He was deployed from 18 January 1985 to 15 May 1985. His behaviour was described as exemplary by his superiors.

=== Criminal activity ===
On 9 August 1988, police from Saône-et-Loire spotted a Volkswagen Type 2 microbus parked on a dead-end road leading to a TGV line that was under construction in the town of Bussières. The police approached the vehicle, thinking that it might belong to environmentalists opposed to the TGV project. Pierre Chanal was inside the vehicle and, when questioned by one of the policemen, explained that he was an "NCO taking advantage of some leave time to do some tourism." The police requested identification, at which time they realized that he was assigned to the 4th Dragoon Regiment in Mourmelon from 1977 to 1986, drawing the connection to the Mourmelon disappearances. The other policeman spotted the head of a man wrapped in a blanket through the rear window of the vehicle. The man, freed from his restraints, was a 20-year-old Hungarian named Balázs Falvay. He explained that he'd been hitchhiking the night before in Chalon-sur-Saône and Chanal had picked him up.

He accused Chanal of having kidnapped and raped him. During the processing of the vehicle, the police found sex toys and a camera with images that included the scenes described by the hitchhiker.

On 23 October 1990, the Saône-et-Loire Assize Court condemned Pierre Chanal to 10 years in prison. He was taken to the prison in Dijon, where he requested to be placed in solitary confinement. Both during and after the trial, Chanal did not speak at all. He was released from prison on 16 June 1995.

Despite his release, the police continued to suspect him of the Mourmelon disappearances due to his psychological profile as well as his being stationed at Camp de Mourmelon during the time in question.

Since January 1980, no fewer than eight people had disappeared from a triangular area of the Mourmelon region. Since 1980, the story had made headlines, embarrassing the judiciary, military and investigators. It was long denied by the military authorities, who claimed the disappearances were desertions. Several military conscripts vanished after hitchhiking while on leave. By 1990, at least seven had disappeared — five soldiers between 1980 and 1982, a civilian traveling to Mourmelon camp in 1985, and a soldier assigned to the 4th Dragoon Regiment in 1987. Adding to these disappearances were two bodies found near the camp: that of Olivier Donner, a 4th Dragoon Regiment of Mourmelon soldier who disappeared in 1982, who was recovered on 31 October of the same year in a grove near Mailly-le-Camp, as well as the body of an Irish tourist, Trevor O'Keefe, found on 8 August 1987 near Alaincourt in Aisne, the body half buried in a grove.

== Death ==
Chanal was found dead on 15 October 2003, putting an end to his trial. He had severed his femoral artery with a razor.

== See also ==
- List of serial killers by number of victims
