= 1987 in France =

- Decades: 1960s; 1970s; 1980s; 1990s; 2000s
- See also: History of France; Timeline of French history; List of years in France

Events from the year 1987 in France.

== Incumbents ==
- President: François Mitterrand
- Prime Minister: Jacques Chirac

== Events ==
- 24 March – The Euro Disneyland Project agreement is signed by The Walt Disney Company and the French government, enabling a theme park to be built to the east of Paris. The theme park, today known as Disneyland Paris, eventually opened in April 1992.
- 11 May – Klaus Barbie goes on trial in Lyon for war crimes committed during World War II.
- May – Peugeot launches the 405 range of four-door saloons; a five-door estate is to follow in 1988. It will be built in France and also at the old Rootes/Chrysler Europe factory in Britain.
- 4 July – A court in Lyon sentences former Gestapo boss Klaus Barbie to life imprisonment for crimes against humanity.
- 1 December – Construction of the Channel Tunnel is initiated.
- 17 December – Peugeot 405 is elected European Car of the Year. Another French car, the Citroen AX, comes second in the contest.

== Births ==
=== January to March ===
- 2 January – Loïc Rémy, soccer player.
- 6 January – Magalie Vaé, singer
- 23 January
  - The Avener, deep house producer
  - Cyril Cinélu, singer.
  - Louisa Nécib, soccer player.
- 9 February – Jérémy Acedo, soccer player.
- 15 February – Romain Gasmi, soccer player.
- 16 February – Willy Aubameyang, soccer player.
- 17 February – Thomas Ayasse, soccer player.
- 26 February – Jean-Philippe Sabo, soccer player.
- 28 February – Édouard Collin, actor.
- 4 March – Jean-Philippe Mendy, soccer player.
- 7 March – Hatem Ben Arfa, soccer player.
- 13 March – Pierre Jamin, soccer player.
- 14 March – Aravane Rezaï, tennis player.
- 16 March – Fabien Lemoine, soccer player.
- 21 March – Maxime Josse, soccer player.
- 23 March – Nathalie Fauquette, rhythmic gymnast.
- 24 March – Pierre-Loup Bouquet, ice dancer.
- 31 March – Amaury Bischoff, soccer player.

=== April to June ===
- 4 April – Jérémy Taravel, soccer player.
- 16 April – Loris Arnaud, soccer player.
- 16 April – Lhadji Badiane, soccer player.
- 18 April – Anthony Roux, cyclist.
- 18 April – Kévin Sireau, cyclist.
- 29 April – Basile Camerling, soccer player.
- 6 May – Romain Beynié, soccer player.
- 7 May – Pierre Ducasse, soccer player.
- 7 May – Serge Gakpé, soccer player.
- 7 May – Jérémy Menez, soccer player.
- 12 May – Loïc Lumbilla Kandja, soccer player.
- 15 May – Kévin Constant, soccer player.
- 26 May – Quentin Garcia, professional ice hockey player.
- 7 June – Jean Philippe Baile, rugby league player.
- 9 June – Toumani Diagouraga, soccer player.
- 9 June – Valentin Roberge, soccer player.
- 26 June – Samir Nasri, international soccer player.
- 27 June – Jean-François Christophe, soccer player.

=== July to September ===
- 21 July – Bilel Mohsni, footballer.
- 23 July – Élodie Brouiller, ice dancer.
- 24 July – Nordine Assami, soccer player.
- 24 July – Cyriaque Louvion, soccer player.
- 30 July – Benoît Costil, soccer player.
- 6 August – Rémy Riou, soccer player.
- 8 August – Pierre Boulanger, actor.
- 19 August – Anaïs Lameche, singer.
- 11 September – Clément Chantôme, soccer player.
- 18 September – Ludovic Genest, soccer player.

=== October to December ===
- 15 October – Serge Akakpo, soccer player.
- 1 December – Rémi Sergio, soccer player.
- 19 December – Karim Benzema, footballer
- 19 December – Cédric Baseya, soccer player.
- 22 December – Garfield Darien, hurdler
- 31 December – Émilie Le Pennec, gymnast, Olympic gold medallist.

== Deaths ==
=== January to June ===
- 2 January – Jean de Gribaldy, cyclist and directeur sportif (born 1922).
- 31 January – Yves Allégret, film director (born 1907).
- 18 February – Edmond Pagès, cyclist (born 1911).
- 24 February – Henri Pinault, Roman Catholic Bishop of Chengdu (born 1904).
- 15 March – Léon Fleuriot, linguist and historian (born 1923).
- 19 March – Louis de Broglie, physicist and a Nobel laureate (born 1892).
- 1 April – Henri Cochet, tennis player (born 1901).
- 3 May – Dalida, singer (born 1933).
- 23 June – Sauveur Ducazeaux, cyclist (born 1911).

=== July to December ===
- 6 July – Pierre Marcilhacy, politician (born 1910).
- 30 July – Michel Tapié, artist, art critic, curator and art collector (born 1909)
- 3 August – Jean Douvinet, Olympic wrestler (1920) (born 1899).
- 6 August – Léon Noël, diplomat, politician and historian (born 1888).
- 23 August – Didier Pironi, motor racing driver (born 1952).
- 29 August – Jean Schlumberger, jewelry designer (born 1907).
- 3 October – Jean Anouilh, dramatist (born 1910).
- 27 October – Jean Hélion, painter and author (born 1904).
- 28 October – André Masson, artist (born 1896).
- 1 November – Pierre Matignon, cyclist (born 1943).
- 3 November – André Roussin, playwright (born 1911).
- 4 November – Pierre Seghers, poet and editor (born 1906).
- 5 November – Georges Franju, filmmaker (born 1912).
- 6 November – Jean Rivier, composer (born 1896).
- 18 November – Jacques Anquetil, cyclist, five times Tour de France winner (born 1934).
- 2 December – Luis Federico Leloir, doctor and biochemist who received the 1970 Nobel Prize in Chemistry (born 1906).
- 3 December – Pierre Mollaret, neurologist (born 1898).
- 13 December – Julien Darui, international soccer player (born 1916).
- 15 December – François Borde, rugby union player (born 1899).

=== Full date unknown ===
- Roland Ansieau, graphic artist (born 1901).
- Norbert Casteret, caver and adventurer (born 1897).
- Henri Decaë, cinematographer (born 1915).
- Robert Filliou, artist (born 1926).
- René Hardy, French Resistance member (born 1911).
- Raymond Ruyer, philosopher (born 1902).
- Michel Tapié, artist, critic, curator and art collector (born 1909).
