= 1985 in France =

- Decades: 1960s; 1970s; 1980s; 1990s; 2000s
- See also: History of France; Timeline of French history; List of years in France

Events from the year 1985 in France.

== Incumbents ==
- President: François Mitterrand
- Prime Minister: Laurent Fabius

== Events ==
- 1 February – 13 nations and the World Bank set up a fund for Africa
- 10 March – Cantonales Elections held.
- 17 March – Cantonales Elections held.
- 3 April – The government announces changes to the country's electoral system, so that deputies will in future be elected by proportional representation.
- 10 July – The Greenpeace vessel Rainbow Warrior is bombed and sunk in Auckland harbour by Direction Générale de la Sécurité Extérieure (DGSE) agents.
- 25 July – American actor Rock Hudson, 59, announces from his bed in a Paris hospital that he is suffering from AIDS.
- 1 September – A joint American-French expedition locates the wreck of the RMS Titanic.
- October – Peugeot launches its new 309 hatchback, which will be built at Poissy and also at the Ryton plant near Coventry, England, which currently produces Talbot cars. The 309 was developed with the intention of using the Talbot brand (which had been used since 1979 after Peugeot bought the European operations of American carmaker Chrysler), but Talbot will soon be phased out on passenger cars.
- 22 September – 5 October. Paris's oldest bridge, the Pont Neuf, is entirely wrapped in polyamide fabric by artists Christo and Jeanne-Claude.
- 22 November – Launch of the Renault 21, which will go on sale in the new year as replacement for the Renault 18.
- 18 December – A site to the east of Paris is selected by Disney as the site of the Euro Disney resort and theme park; it is hoped that the resort will be open by 1991.

== Births ==
=== January to March ===
- 5 January – Mélanie Bernier, actress.
- 11 January – Julien Loubet, cyclist.
- 13 January – Souleymane Bamba, soccer player.
- 18 January – Benoît Benvegnu, soccer player.
- 22 January – Kevin Lejeune, soccer player.
- 23 January – Guy Moussi, soccer player.
- 23 January – Sarah Tanzilli, politician.
- 29 January – Salomé Stévenin, actress.
- 31 January – Grégory Baugé, cyclist.
- 1 February – Yohann Lacroix, soccer player.
- 4 February – Clément Pinault, soccer player.
- 7 February – Christophe Mandanne, soccer player.
- 8 February – Habib Baldé, soccer player.
- 22 February – Hamer Bouazza, soccer player.
- 25 February – Joakim Noah, Former basketball player
- 28 February – Fabien Camus, soccer player.
- 4 March – Mathieu Montcourt, tennis player.
- 7 March – Mohamed Fofana, soccer player.
- 10 March – Lassana Diarra, soccer player.
- 14 March – Loïc Jacquet, rugby union player.
- 22 March – Lizzie Brocheré, actress
- 23 March – Jonathan Hivert, cyclist.
- 28 March – Steve Mandanda, association football player

=== April to June ===
- 17 April – Jo-Wilfried Tsonga, tennis player
- 19 April – Nicolas Maurice-Belay, soccer player.
- 22 April – Florian Cazalot, rugby union player.
- 24 April – Joséphine Jobert, actress and singer
- 30 April – Guillaume Rippert, soccer player.
- 8 May – Cédric Pineau, cyclist.
- 9 May – Jérémie Roumegous, soccer player.
- 10 May – Pierre Drancourt, cyclist.
- 12 May – André-Pierre Gignac, soccer player.
- 14 May – Baptiste Martin, soccer player.
- 20 May – Maxime Laheurte, Nordic combined skier.
- 23 May – Jean-Charles Sénac, cyclist.
- 25 May – Demba Ba, footballer
- 28 May – Simon Pouplin, soccer player.
- 1 June – Julien El Fares, cyclist.
- 2 June – Mathieu Robail, soccer player.
- 3 June – Jiovanny William, politician
- 17 June – Jean-Baptiste Pierazzi, soccer player.
- 18 June – Bertrand N'Dzomo, soccer player.
- 21 June – Amel Bent, singer
- 26 June – Stéphane Poulhies, cyclist.

=== July to September ===
- 1 July – Léa Seydoux, actress
- 4 July – David Larose, judoka.
- 12 July – Maurice Dalé, soccer player.
- 12 July – Jean-Christophe Vergerolle, soccer player.
- 16 July – Olivier Veigneau, soccer player.
- 22 July – Boukary Dramé, soccer player.
- 25 July – Mathieu Debuchy, soccer player.
- 25 July – Guillaume Levarlet, cyclist.
- 26 July – Gaël Clichy, soccer player.
- 31 July – Rémy Di Gregorio, cyclist.
- 6 August – Bafétimbi Gomis, footballer
- 7 August – Loïc Perrin, soccer player.
- 15 August – Julien N'Da, soccer player.
- 10 September – Laurent Koscielny, soccer player.
- 12 September – Jonatan Cerrada, Belgian-born singer and winner of À la Recherche de la Nouvelle Star
- 19 September – Paul Vannier, politician.
- 20 September – Alban Préaubert, figure skater.
- 21 September – Jean-Louis Leca, soccer player.
- 26 September – Matt Pokora, singer.

=== October to December ===
- 3 October – Julien Gerbi, motor racing driver
- 4 October – Julien Simon, cyclist
- 24 October – Lionel Beauxis, rugby union player
- 26 October – Soko, musician and actress
- 29 October – Romain Vincelot, soccer player
- 4 November – Gauthier Diafutua, soccer player
- 8 November – Vincent Bessat, soccer player
- 18 November – Thomas Portes, politician.
- 26 November – Sophie Huber, freestyle swimmer
- 28 November – Shy'm, singer
- 2 December – Amaury Leveaux, swimmer
- 19 December – Julien Toudic, soccer player
- 28 December – Benoît Trémoulinas, soccer player

=== Full date unknown ===
- Faïza Guène, writer and director.

== Deaths ==
=== January to June ===
- 2 January – Jacques de Lacretelle, novelist (born 1888).
- 3 January – Lucien Cailliet, composer, conductor, arranger and clarinetist (born 1891).
- 14 February – Jean-Marie Loret, railroad worker and alleged illegitimate son of Adolf Hitler
- 20 February – Georges Girard, bacteriologist (born 1888).
- 12 March – Alfred Eluère, rugby union player (born 1893).
- 28 March – Marc Chagall, Russian–French artist (born 1887).
- 15 April – Marc-Gilbert Sauvajon, film director, script-writer, playwright and author (born 1909).
- 17 April – Germaine Sablon, singer and actress (born 1899).
- 20 April – André Rollet, footballer (born 1905).
- 12 May – Jean Dubuffet, painter and sculptor (born 1901).
- 31 May – Gaston Rébuffat, alpinist and mountain guide (born 1921).
- 31 May – Louis Robert, historian and author (born 1904).
- 1 June – Eugène Séguy, entomologist (born 1890).
- 12 June – Dominique Laffin, actress (born 1952).

=== July to December ===
- 9 July – Pierre-Paul Grassé, zoologist (born 1895).
- 17 July – Philippe de Chérisey, writer, radio humorist, and actor (born 1923).
- 1 August – Jules Moch, politician (born 1893).
- 14 August – Marie Bell, actress and stage director (born 1900).
- 29 August – Michel Pécheux, fencer (born 1911).
- 3 September – Gilles Thomas, science fiction writer (born 1929).
- 30 September – Simone Signoret, actress (born 1921).
- 24 November – René Barjavel, author, journalist and critic (born 1911).
- 27 November
  - Fernand Braudel, historian (born 1902).
  - André Hunebelle, film director (born 1896).
- 13 December – Pierre Nord, writer, spy and resistance member (born 1900).
- 27 December – Jean Rondeau, motor racing driver and constructor (born 1946).

=== Full date unknown ===
- Gerard Albouy, milliner (born 1912).
- Ferdinand Alquié, philosopher (born 1906).
- François Châtelet, historian of philosophy (born 1925).
- Henri-Robert Petit, journalist, Collaborationist under the Vichy regime and far-right activist (born 1899).
