= 1983 in France =

- Decades: 1960s; 1970s; 1980s; 1990s; 2000s
- See also: History of France; Timeline of French history; List of years in France

Events from the year 1983 in France.

== Incumbents ==
- President: François Mitterrand
- Prime Minister: Pierre Mauroy

== Events ==
- 19 January – Nazi war criminal Klaus Barbie is arrested in Bolivia.
- February – Launch of the Pininfarina styled modern supermini hatchback, the Peugeot 205, which will be produced alongside the 104, though its predecessor is set to be withdrawn from most export markets by the end of the year once the 205 is on sale in all key markets. The 205 is initially sold as a five-door hatchback, but will be joined by a three-door version and a high performance GTI next year.
- 6 February – Klaus Barbie is officially charged with war crimes.
- 24 February – The Peugeot 205 supermini is officially launched with a range of hatchbacks and convertibles.
- 6 March – Municipal Elections held.
- 13 March – Municipal Elections held.
- 23 September – Violence erupts in New Caledonia between native Kanaks and French expatriates. The French government withdraws the promise of independence.
- 16 October – Production of Renault's flagship 20 and 30 is finished after eight years to make way for the 25.
- 23 October – Simultaneous suicide truck-bombings destroy both the French and the United States Marine Corps barracks in Beirut, killing 241 US servicemen, 58 French paratroopers and 6 Lebanese civilians.
- 20 November – Launch of the Renault 25 executive car, replacement for both the Renault 20 and Renault 30.
- 31 December – Two bombs explode in France. One on the Paris train kills 3 and injures 19. The other at Marseille station kills 2 and injures 34.

== Births ==
=== January to March ===
- 6 January – Alexandre Pichot, cyclist.
- 7 January – Stéphanie Falzon, hammer thrower.
- 10 January – Romauld Bouadji, soccer player.
- 12 January – Bryan Bergougnoux, soccer player.
- 13 January – Ronny Turiaf, basketball player.
- 17 January – Mamadi Berthe, soccer player.
- 22 January – Étienne Bacrot, chess grandmaster.
- 26 January – Abdoulaye Diawara, soccer player.
- 1 February – Mathieu Drujon, cyclist.
- 2 February – Jérémie Iordanoff, politician
- 3 February – Damiel Dossévi, pole vaulter.
- 12 February – Anthony Floch, rugby union player.
- 14 February – Bacary Sagna, soccer player.
- 16 February – Tristan Lahaye, soccer player.
- 17 February – Gérald Cid, soccer player.
- 17 February – Émilie Fer, slalom canoer.
- 21 February
  - Benoît Lesoimier, soccer player.
  - Mélanie Laurent, actress
- 22 February – Mathieu Moreau, soccer player.
- 24 February – Rémi Maréval, soccer player.
- 2 March
  - Olivier Bonnaire, cyclist.
  - Sébastien Agius, singer.
- 3 March – Cyril Lemoine, cyclist.
- 5 March – Mickaël Antoine-Curier, soccer player.
- 8 March – Guillaume Moreau, motor racing driver.
- 11 March – Céline Couderc, freestyle swimmer
- 15 March – Armand One, soccer player.
- 16 March – Nicolas Rousseau, cyclist.
- 18 March – Stéphanie Cohen-Aloro, tennis player.
- 28 March – Ladji Doucouré, athlete.
- 30 March – Jérémie Aliadière, soccer player.

=== April to June ===
- 1 April – Franck Ribéry, international soccer player.
- 3 April – Ludovic Butelle, soccer player.
- 18 April – François Clerc, soccer player.
- 24 April – Cyril Théréau, soccer player.
- 25 April – Maxime Brillault, soccer player.
- 1 May – Alain Bernard, swimmer.
- 3 May – Jérôme Clavier, pole vaulter.
- 4 May – Julien Malzieu, rugby union player.
- 6 May – Julien Belgy, cyclist.
- 9 May – Jean-Michel Badiane, soccer player.
- 13 May – Edouard Duplan, soccer player.
- 13 May – Grégory Lemarchal, singer (died 2007).
- 14 May – Mathieu Valverde, soccer player.
- 17 May – Mathieu Claude, cyclist.
- 25 May – Ibrahim Diarra, rugby union player. (died 2019)
- 1 June – Fabien Laurenti, soccer player.
- 9 June – Claude Gnakpa, soccer player.
- 14 June – Louis Garrel, actor.
- 14 June – Fabien Patanchon, cyclist.
- 22 June – Jérémy Roy, cyclist.
- 25 June – Patrick Noubissie, soccer player.
- 28 June – Reynald Lemaître, soccer player.

=== July to September ===
- 15 July – Julien Leparoux, jockey.
- 24 July – Étienne Didot, soccer player.
- 31 July – François Marque, soccer player.
- 1 August – Julien Faubert, soccer player.
- 1 August – Julien Rantier, soccer player.
- 5 August – Jérémy Sorbon, soccer player.
- 15 August – Alain Cantareil, soccer player.
- 15 August – Jean-Marc Marino, cyclist.
- 2 September – Jonathan Assous, soccer player.
- 2 September – Christophe Grondin, soccer player.
- 5 September – Cédric Bockhorni, soccer player.
- 7 September – Benoît Baby, rugby union player.
- 10 September – Jérémy Toulalan, international soccer player.
- 14 September – Olivier Auriac, soccer player.
- 20 September – Jérémy Gavanon, soccer player.

=== October to December ===
- 26 October – Julien Arias, rugby union player.
- 27 October – Jessy Matador, singer
- 29 October – Jérémy Mathieu, soccer player.
- 2 November – Sophie Milliet, chess player.
- 2 November – Alain Schmitt, judoka.
- 3 November – Rémi Fournier, soccer player.
- 5 November – Julien Saubade, rugby union player.
- 8 November – Gabriel Nassif, card player.
- 16 November – Bertrand Robert, soccer player.
- 28 November – Édouard Roger-Vasselin, tennis player.
- 8 December – Pierre Roger, swimmer.
- 17 December – Sébastien Ogier rally driver
- 12 December – Johan Audel, soccer player.
- 22 December – Nathalie Péchalat, ice dancer.

=== Full date unknown ===
- Nicolas Saint Grégoire, artist and designer

== Deaths ==
=== January to March ===
- 15 January – Henri Debain, actor (born 1886).
- 27 January – Georges Bidault politician and resistance leader (born 1899).
- 27 January – Louis de Funès, actor (born 1914).
- 28 January – Claude Papi, soccer player (born 1949).
- 2 February – Corentin Louis Kervran, scientist (born 1901).
- 17 February – Waldeck Rochet, politician (born 1905).
- 2 March – Olivier Chandon de Brailles, motor racing driver (born 1955).
- 13 March – Louison Bobet, cyclist, three times Tour de France winner (born 1925).
- 14 March – Maurice Ronet, actor, director and writer (born 1927).

=== April to June ===
- 12 April – Pierre Richard-Willm, actor (born 1895).
- 21 April – Édouard Bader, rugby union player (born 1899).
- 23 April – Marguerite Broquedis, tennis player (born 1893).
- 19 June – Henri Enjalbert, professor of geography (born 1910).

=== July to September ===
- 23 July – Georges Auric, composer (born 1899).
- 16 August – René Duverger, weightlifter and Olympic gold medallist (born 1911).
- 20 August – Georges Spénale, writer, poet and politician, President of the European Parliament (born 1913).
- 21 September – Marie-Gabriel Tissot, Abbot of Quarr (born 1886).
- 26 September
  - Henri Navarre, General (born 1898).
  - Tino Rossi, singer and actor (born 1907).

=== October to December ===
- 2 October – Louis Béguet, rugby union player (born 1894).
- 7 October – Célestin Lainé, Breton nationalist and Axis collaborator
- 8 October – Alexandre Renard, Roman Catholic cardinal (born 1906).
- 17 October – Raymond Aron, philosopher, sociologist and political scientist (born 1905).
- 26 October – Charles Ducasse, soccer player (born 1932).
- 5 November – Jean-Marc Reiser, comics creator (born 1941).
- 7 November – Germaine Tailleferre, composer (born 1892).
- 15 November – Marc Bernard, writer (born 1900).
- 18 November – Émile Veinante, soccer player and coach (born 1907).
- 20 November – Marcel Dalio, actor (born 1900).
- 6 December – Lucienne Boyer, singer (born 1903).
- 10 December – Michel Pêcheux, linguist and philosopher (born 1938)
- 19 December – Fania Fénelon, pianist, composer and cabaret singer (born 1908).
- 24 December – Paul Gégauff, screenwriter, actor and director (born 1922).
- 28 December – Eugène Chaboud, motor racing driver (born 1907).
