= Nicolas Théobald =

French geologist, paleontologist and professor of geology

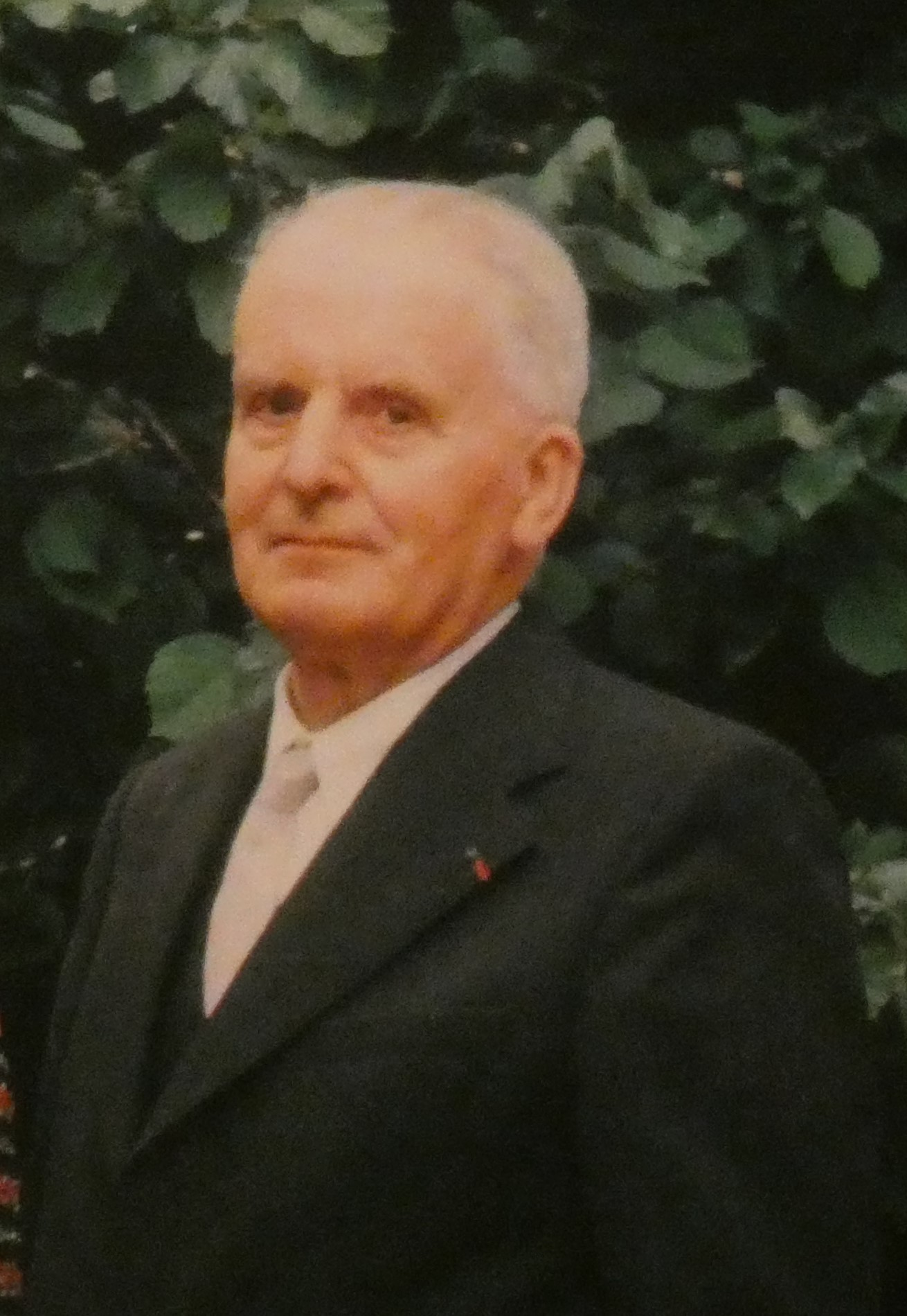
- Geologist and paleontologist Nicolas Théobald in Besançon in 1976
- Born: 31 August 1903; Montenach, France
- Died: 10 May 1981 (aged 77); Obernai, France
- Scientific career
- Fields: Paleontology; Geology; Entomology; Education
- Institutions: Saarland University, University of Franche-Comté
- Thesis: Les insectes fossiles des terrains oligocènes de France (1937)

Nicolas Théobald, born in Montenach (Moselle) on August 31, 1903 and died in Obernai (Bas-Rhin) on May 10, 1981, was a Lorrain and French geologist, paleontologist and professor of geology at university of Besançon.

He is best known for the new orientation of his state thesis on Fossil Insects from the Oligocene Lands of France (1937). He discovered several genera and more than 300 species of insects; however, these fossils being often very close to current species, it was not their stratigraphic value that was put forward, but their biogeographical significance, making it possible to determine the climatic and environmental characteristics of their living environments and to describe the landscapes of Oligocene “France”.

He was also a specialist in the geological history of the entire Middle Rhine and Moselle basin. He insisted on the evidence of quaternary tectonic movements mainly in the Rhine trench.

With an agrégation in Natural Sciences, he very early had the vocation of teaching and, as a professor of geology at the University of Saarbrücken, then at the University of Besançon, trained many researchers, while drawing attention to the need to protect drinking water resources and fragile natural environments.

== Biography ==
=== Youth ===
Nicolas Théobald was born in Montenach, in a village near Germany and Luxembourg as he tells in his book of memories À l'heure des cloches de mon village : Scènes d'un village lorrain du début du 20e siècle. He spent his entire childhood "rhythmic to the sound of bells"; he came from a family of eight children, his father being the mayor of the village, practicing husbandry and working in the fields. His mother used to go to the nearby local market to sell farm products, such as the lump of butter, "well-kneaded and containing no trace of whey", which she was famous for, as well as dozens of eggs "a dime a dozen, according to the custom of the small town", which the "bourgeoises of Sierck" hastened to take away.

=== Training ===
In March 1918, he prepared for the entrance examination to the normal school at the preparatory school of Phalsbourg. He left his village at the age of fifteen in order to study and obtain his diplomas, only returning there during the holidays. Fifty years in the service of teaching and research will follow.

After the return of Alsace-Lorraine to France, Nicolas Théobald was admitted to the Normal school of teachers of Metz, first of the class of 1920-1923. This is the opportunity to discover the witnesses of the Gallo-Roman past of the Moselle at the Musée de Metz. In Montenach, Monographie d'un village lorrain , Nicolas tells how, on the advice of the curator Roger Clément, he searches in the fields of Montenach for the remains of large tiles which could bear the seal of the manufacturer. His younger brother Albert, who accompanies him, finds one with six lines of text; translated by R. Clément, they reveal an account of the working hours of a worker in the tile factory. This precious vestige, dating from the 2nd century, is still kept at the Museums of Metz. Nicolas continued his fourth year at the École normale de Lyon and successfully entered the École normale supérieure de Saint-Cloud (1924–1926); his encounters with Teilhard de Chardin determine his vocation.

=== Career ===
After his military service, he was appointed professor at the Normal School of Obernai in 1927, studying at the same time at University of Strasbourg and became aggregate of natural sciences in 1930, date from which he teaches at the high school of Mulhouse, then at the high school of Nancy. He defended his thesis in Nancy in 1937 then he was appointed inspector of academy at Albi (1937), then at Colmar (1938).

With the start of the war in 1939, N. Théobald was mobilized as a lieutenant in artillery at Coëtquidan then officer geologist at Mulhouse. After the debacle, he found himself, from 1940 to 1944, inspector of the Academy in Châteauroux, where his links with the maquis berrichon allowed him to hide some "malgré-nous" from Alsace-Lorraine.

During the gradual Liberation of French territory, Châteauroux was liberated on September 10, 1944 and the Provisional Government of the French Republic appointed Nicolas Théobald Inspector of the Academy in Strasbourg (November 15, 1944). He arrived there during the liberation of the great Alsatian city (November 23, 1944). He was responsible for reopening the schools in the villages as the German troops withdrew, until the final liberation of Lauterbourg on March 19, 1945.

After the war, he was appointed chief administrator of the public education services of Baden, in Freiburg im Breisgau (1945–1948). Perfectly bilingual, he works in a spirit of Franco-German reconciliation, following the movement launched by Robert Schuman. In 1948, he participated in the founding of the University of Saarland, Universitas Saraviensis, where he was appointed as geology professor, and where he was elected Dean of the Faculty of Sciences (1949–1953). Then, he continued his career at the University of Besançon, as holder of the chair of Historical Geology and Paleontology (1953–1974).

== Works and publications ==
Nicolas Théobald has published many books and articles, particularly related to his research in Geology, Paleontology and Historical Geology and to his duties as geology professor at the universities of Saarbrücken and Besançon.

His basic works for the preparation for recruitment competitions for the teaching of earth sciences are based on a long practice of research in the field and in the laboratory, including his state thesis, "Les Insectes fossiles des terrains oligocènes de France", is the best-known testimony.

He is the author of many geological maps.

A complete chronological list of articles and geological maps can be found on Wikispecies.

Pict. 1, 2 and 3: Nested or stepped terraces.

=== Alluvial and Neotectonic terraces ===
During his studies, Nicolas Théobald had been seduced by the avant-garde ideas of Alfred Wegener (1880–1930), theoretician of continental drift. But, in the first half of the 20th century, most geologists and geographers believe that the tectonic movements responsible for the establishment of continents and mountains are no longer sensitive to the Quaternary era. The modifications of the relief, when the continents are stable, are then linked to the variations in the level of the oceans, as explained by the eustatic theory, resulting from the work of the American geologist W.M. Davis and whose main representative in France was, at the beginning of the 20th century, Henri Baulig, professor of geography at the University of Strasbourg (1877–1962).

==== Controversies surrounding the eustatic theory ====
These controversies were mentioned by the former students of N. Théobald: J. Blaison, M. Campy, D. Contini and Y. Rangheard, in a summary article devoted to his career.

Comparison of two reconstructions of sea levels during the last 500 million years. The scale of change during the last glacial/interglacial transition is indicated by the black vertical bar. For most of geologic history, long-term mean sea level was significantly higher than it is today.

Geologists agree on the fact that during the Quaternary, the level of the oceans underwent significant fluctuations, linked to temperature variations. During the glacial periods, water being capitalized in mountain glaciers and ice sheets, the sea level fell, which favored erosion in the lower course of the rivers, while their upper course was cluttered with fluvial-glacials debris. During interglacial periods, the rise in sea level favored aggradation downstream. At least four glacial periods have been listed in the Quaternary and the alternation of phases of digging and filling allowed the formation of stepped or nested terraces along the watercourses (Pictures 1, 2 and 3).

The eustatic theory is justified in regions that have been stable since the end of the Tertiary era, such as large sedimentary basins, and Nicolas Théobald applied it in his first work on the Moselle valley downstream of Thionville; he recognizes terraces at 90, 60, 40 and 15 meters above the low water level of the river and relates them to the four great glacial periods of the Quaternary.

But his studies on the old alluvial terraces of the Rhine in Alsace and in the Baden reveal an aberrant arrangement: their relative altitude decreases from upstream to downstream, where they drown in the recent alluvium, and the bedrock is getting deeper and deeper. N. Théobald, recalling the consistent observations of A. Gutzwiller (1894). (1912)., Johannes Ernst Wilhelm Deecke (1917), and A. Briquet (1928) ., (1930)., concludes like these geologists that, during the deposition of alluvium, the Haut-Rhin plain continued to sink (1933). This region near Basel, classified in zone IX-X on a scale of XII, the MSK scale, is still affected by earthquakes; in 1356, the city of Basel was almost completely destroyed by a historic earthquake.

The young geologist intends to develop this theme in a thesis, but at the University of Strasbourg, where he obtained his bachelor's degree and his university master's degree in science, the geographer Henri Baulig, a supporter of the eustatic theory, had his students work on the valleys of the Alsatian side of the Vosges, it is up to them to demonstrate the stability of the massif in the Quaternary. The geographer does not accept the quaternary subsidence of the Rhine graben (1935). The pressure of the eustatic school forced Nicolas Théobald to abandon his work and find another subject of research, in paleontology. He will wait more than 10 years for the freedom to take up the theme of neotectonics in the Rhine ditch.

==== Recognition of neotectonic theories ====
Resuming his research at the end of the war, Nicolas Théobald published precise data in 1948 in a memoir on the south of the Rhine ditch, and he affirmed that "It is impossible to explain the accumulation of 200, sometimes 300 and even 400 meters of alluvium in certain parts of the ditch, if we do not admit that the very bottom of the ditch was lowered during the deposit" (p. 40-41).

Then, in 1949, in his 'Contribution to the study of the lower Rhine terrace", between Basel and Karlsruhe, N. Théobald concluded that "tectonic movements interfered with the backfilling phenomena linked to the eustatism of the base levels". The views of the partisans of eustatism and those of the tectonicians are thus reconciled.

Between 1950 and 1977, N. Théobald still published many articles on the Rhine ditch, Lorraine, the south of the Vosges and the Saône ditch, where he underlined the importance of vertical movements in the Quaternary. He is in agreement with the researchers who propose to explain the subsidence of the Rhine ditch by isostatic compensation for the uplift of the old massifs which surround it. From now on, the “neotectonicians” are numerous, both in France and in Germany. The notion of quaternary tectonic movements, linked to the “plate theory” is universally accepted.

=== Paleontology and Ecology ===
When he had to abandon his thesis subject on neotectonics, N. Théobald had already published several articles on the fauna of the secondary or quaternary eras. Indeed, the geologist seeking to date the sedimentary terrains on which he works, for example to establish a "geological map", is happy to find fossils and must identify them. Some species have never been described before. He must give them a name!

==== Fossil insects from the Oligocene terrains of France: 1937 thesis ====
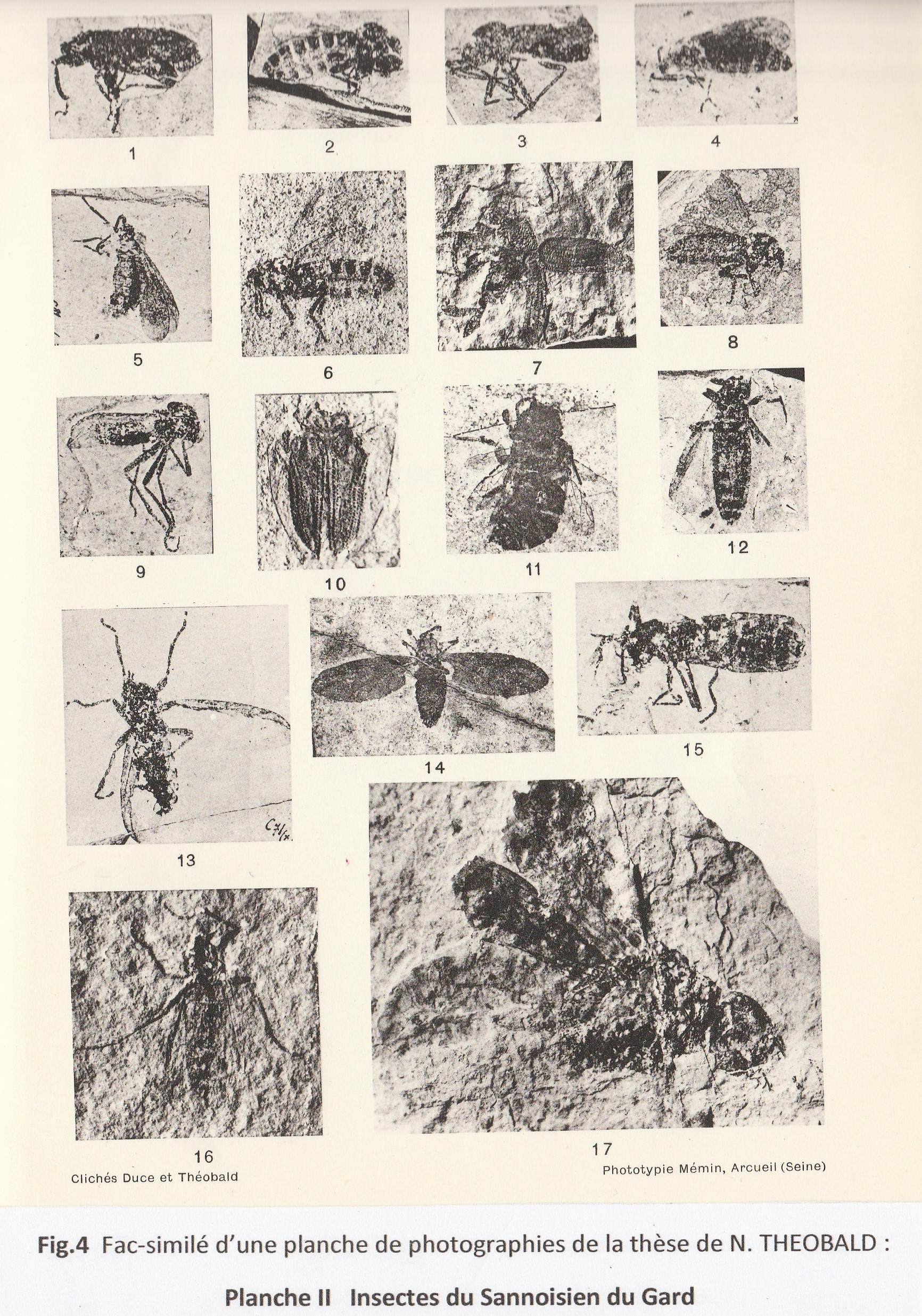
Pict. 4: Thesis of Nicolas Théobald, pl. II, Insects of Sannoisien du Gard (Note: Détail de la Fig. 4 : 1. Syrphidae? 2.Bibio celasensis N. TH., 3. Plecia försteri N. TH., 4. Plecia augustiventris N. TH., 5. Plecia splendida N. TH., 6. Bibio obtusa N. TH., 7. Strophosomus marcelini N. TH., 8. Bibio tenuiapicalis N. TH., 9.Plecia cf longua HEER, 10.Oligocassida melaena N. TH., 11.Tetralonia berlandi N. TH., 12. Bibio macerata N.TH., 13. Bibio elongatipennis N.TH., 14. Plecia splendida N.TH., 15. Plecia superba N.TH., 16.Plecia longiventris N. TH., 17. Cryptochilus contentus N.TH..( tous sont des holotypes, sauf les échantillons 1 et 9; tous les échantillons proviennent du gisement de Célas, sauf le 6 (Monteils), 10 et 16 (Les Fumades))). 33.9–28.1 Ma Cenozoic : Oligocene

Studies on fossil insects were rare when Nicolas Théobald undertook his thesis on Oligocene insects; these are found only in continental or lacustrine deposits, often overlooked or marginally studied at the time. These fossils are small and fragile, difficult to preserve. It is exceptional to find whole samples, except if the insect, which fell into a lake or a lagoon in the process of being filled in, was quickly buried under silt, if it found itself enveloped in volcanic ash, or even trapped by a casting of resin, which will give amber. Benefiting from access to the collections of natural history museums, such as Basel, Marseille, Clermont-Ferrand, Brussels, the paleotonologist will analyze approximately 3,000 samples, which will be photographed, drawn, compared to already known fossil insects and to current representatives of the same genera, and determined (Picture 4).

N.THEOBALD, Pict. 5 Aquisextana irenaei, Photograph and graphic interpretation, 1937

These fossils are divided into 650 species, including 300 new ones, which are replaced in their environment, by analyzing the conditions of sedimentation and plant remains: the biotopes are reconstituted, because the fauna characterizes the regional climates well. Thus will be presented a living synthesis of the natural environments of the Oligocene period.

On the territory of present-day France, in the Oligocene, the surface occupied by lakes and lagoons is considerable. In the south and south-east of our country, the Pyrenean orogeny having reached its paroxysmal stage and the Alps and Provence being in the process of uplift, trenches of collapses and synclines welcome the sedimentation of debris torn from the emerged lands:

- Thus, between the Cévennes and the Languedoc Garrigues, a small ditch to the east of Alès (Gard) is occupied by brackish water, where limestone, marly limestone and sandstone are deposited and colonized by water lilies and reeds, with grassy shoals and wooded shores of conifers and pandanus where Bibionidae, flower dipterans with aquatic larvae, or Libellulidae thrive. Higher up grow Acacia celasensis LAURENT. Genus analysis suggests a Mediterranean climate with pronounced subtropical affinities, comparable to the current climate of the East Indies and southern China.
- Further east, north of the current site of Aix-en-Provence, we are closer to the perialpine seas. Limestone marls separating beds of gypsum, exploited for centuries at the “Montée d'Avignon”, have provided a considerable number of fossil insects (p. 291). Here, "lagoons subject to periodic marine influences" are populated by fish hunting insects "in coves with calm waters": Hydrophilidae, Dytiscidae, etc. N. Théobald cites many aquatic plants (Typha latissima HEER, water lilies). On the edges, irises bloom amid sedges and grasses, inhabited by dragonflies and caddisflies, Bibio, Plecia and crane flies. In coniferous forests, anthills are numerous. Above these basins, the links of Provence, already emerged, are occupied by kinds of savannas, as the presence of termites seems to prove.
- In Haute-Alsace, the atmosphere is different, because the Rhine ditch is occupied by a sea communicating with the North Sea, which explains the scarcity of freshwater species (such as dragonflies). The deposits near Mulhouse (Brunstatt) and in the Pays de Bade (Kleinkems), right bank of the Rhine opposite Kembs) present marls in plates from the middle Sannoisian; on the German side, there are more Formicidae and termites, proving the proximity of arid expanses to the location of the current Black Forest. These steppes are traversed by wadis bordered by riparian forests. During floods, the water carries insects mixed with plant debris to brackish lagoons subject to frequent marine influences.
- The thesis also describes insects and Oligocene environments of Céreste (Basses-Alpes, today Alpes-de-Haute-Provence) in the Luberon and many sites in Auvergne.

The coexistence of certain insects shows that, already between 25 and 35 million years before the present time, there are relations of commensalism or parasitism between the species; ants live in societies... In an Additional Note on Oligocene fossil insects from the gypsums of Aix-en-Provence, the paleontologist still describes new species, including a magnificent Lepidoptera of the Lycaenidae family, Aquisextana irenaei, dedicated to his wife Irene (Picture 5). This paleontological study appears as a veritable ecology of the past. The originality of the method was recognized until Canada.

==== Other paleontological contributions ====
Nicolas Théobald has devoted many other works to the Oligocene period, in particular on fish from Alsace and Auvergne.

Other research has concerned the Lower Permian (or Cisuralian) Stegocephalia from Saint-Wendel in Sarre, the ammonites from Alsace or Franche-Comté or the Quaternary faunas in Alsace, in the Palatinate and in Franche-Comté.

The basic work published in 1958 with A. Gama underlines the influence of the environment on the evolution of living beings and insists on the balance in biotopes. Another work, dealing with the geological foundations of prehistory, was the subject of a broad review by Henriette Alimen, (Director of the Quaternary Geology Laboratory of the CNRS), in the session of the French Prehistoric Society of 02/28 /1973.

=== Ecology, hydrology and human life ===
The paleontologist is aware that the degradation of the environment leads to that of the life associated with it. Confronted with the problems of human groups, it retains the same ecological orientation. As part of his duties as a geologist associated with the BRGM for the development of geological maps, Nicolas Théobald was to ensure the search for drinking water for the communes of Haute-Saône; noting the risks of groundwater pollution by sandpits, metal processing workshops, slaughterhouses, dairies and landfills, he urged mayors to create security perimeters around drinking water catchments. From this experience came the publication of a book on the geology and hydrogeology of the Haute-Saône.

His interventions were sometimes linked to large-scale projects, such as the creation of an artificial lake in Vaivre (near Vesoul, Haute-Saône), a project led by the mayor of Vaivre. In a recent work, the mayor at the time, Pierre Bonnet, recalls the intervention of Professor Théobald of the University of Besançon, "scientist of reference for all geological studies", who in 1970 wrote a report prior to the establishment of the lake. This was built from 1976 to 1978; the materials extracted during the excavation were deposited on land dedicated to the extension of the PSA plant in Vesoul. This Vaivre-et-Montoille lake, which extends over 95 hectares, is today a leisure area and a natural area of ecological interest where many migratory birds stop.

=== Conservation of the natural heritage of the village of Montenach ===
Retired, Nicolas Théobald took the time to write a monograph of his native village and a collection of his childhood memories.

At the same time, he is committed to the conservation of the natural heritage of the hills which served as pasture for sheep and pigs all around the village; they are occupied by dry lawns where spectacular orchids thrive in particular (Dactylorhiza maculata, Orchis mascula, Orchis militaris). The child of the country convinces the municipality to fight against reforestation favored by the abandonment of ancestral practices of breeding. After his death (1981), the municipal council of Montenach and several owners agreed, with the department of Moselle, to erect the dry lawns into a voluntary nature reserve, the seven hills reserve, dedicated to Professor Nicolas Théobald. A management agreement was signed between the municipality and the Conservatoire des Sites Lorrains in 1987. Then the national nature reserve of Montenach was classified by decree of February 8, 1994. It is now managed by the Conservatory of natural spaces of Lorraine.

Nicolas Théobald was one of those who alerted public opinion to the need to take measures to protect nature. The paleontologist is not a scientist closed to life; on the contrary, the search for traces of life in a petrified world gives him a particular sensitivity to the protection of its current forms, which the abusive exploitation of natural environments endangers.

== See also ==
- Taxa named by Nicolas Théobald

== Awards ==
Nicolas Théobald is the recipient of the following decorations :

- 1949: Knight of the Order of the Legion of Honor
- 1963: Commander of the Academic Palms
- 1965: Knight of the Agricultural Merit
- 1974: Officer in the Ordre national du Mérite

== Publications ==
=== Author's works ===
- Thèse : Nicolas Théobald (1937). Written at France. Les insectes fossiles des terrains oligocènes de France (Thesis) (in French). Thèses Université de Nancy.: Bulletin mensuel de la Société des Sciences de Nancy et Mémoires de la Société des Sciences de Nancy (in French). pp. 473 pp., 17 fig., 7 cartes, 13 tables, 29 planches hors-texte. OCLC 786027547.
- Nicolas Théobald (1971). Géologie et Hydrogéologie de la Haute-Sâone (in French). France: Annales Scientifiques de l'Université de Besançon. pp. 3e série, Géologie, fasc.14, 76 pp., 15 fig., 10 planches hors-texte, 2 cartes.
- Nicolas Théobald (1972). Written at France. Les Fondements Géologiques de la Préhistoire. Essai de chronostratigraphie des formations quaternaires (in French). Paris: Doin. pp. 95 pp., 45 figures.
- Nicolas Théobald (1975). Montenach, Monographie d'un village lorrain. Obernai 9 rue de la Victoire, 67210 (in French). France. pp. 211 pp., 28 fig., 5 pl.
- Nicolas Théobald (1979). Written at France. À l'heure des cloches de mon village : Scènes d'un village lorrain au début du XXème siècle (in French). Obernai. pp. 176 pp., 160 fig., 4 pl. ISBN 2-307-43014-8.

=== Author articles ===
- Nicolas Théobald (1931). "Les alluvions anciennes de la Moselle aux environs de Sierck". Compte Rendu Sommaire de la Société Géologique de France (in French): 2: 10–12. ISSN 0037-9417.
- Nicolas Théobald (1932). "Le pays de Sierck, Description géologique comprenant une étude détaillée des terrasses de la Moselle entre Koenigsmacker et Sierck". Bulletin de la Société d'Histoire de la Moselle. 4e série (in French). 33: IX: 1–45, 5 figures, 8 planches. ISSN 1149-4719.
- Nicolas Théobald (1933). "Observations sur la basse terrasse du Rhin en aval de Bâle". Bulletin de la Société Industrielle de Mulhouse, IC (in French): 21–27, 3 fig.
- Nicolas Théobald (1934). "Contribution à la paléontologie du bassin oligocène du Haut-Rhin et du Territoire de Belfort. Les poissons oligocènes". Bulletin du Service de la Carte géologique d'Alsace et de Lorraine (in French). 2 (2): (2): 117–162, planches XI-XV. doi:10.3406/sgeol.1934.1106. ISSN 0037-2560.
- Les formations quaternaires : Nicolas Théobald (1935). "Les formations quaternaires". L'Enseignement scientifique, 8e année (in French): (79): 262–271, (80): 303–307, 6 figures, 1 tableau. ISSN 0367-1372.
- Nicolas Théobald (1935). "Les alluvions anciennes de la Moselle et de la Meurthe en amont de Sierck". Bulletin du Centenaire de la Société d'Histoire Naturelle de la Moselle (in French). Metz: (3), 34:69–100, 1 figure, 2 tableaux.
- Note complémentaire : Nicolas Théobald (June 1937). "Note complémentaire sur les insectes fossiles oligocènes des gypses d'Aix-en-Provence. BM SSN Juin 1937". Bulletin de la Société des Sciences de Nancy (in French): (6):157–178, 2 planches, 7 figures. ISSN 1155-1119. Archived from the original (PDF) on 2022-08-18.
- Découverte : Nicolas Théobald (1937). "Découverte d'une défense de Mammouth, Elephas primigenius, dans les alluvions de la plaine rhénane de Valff (Bas-Rhin). BM SSN Mai 1937" (PDF). Bulletin de la Société des Sciences de Nancy (in French): (5):142–145. ISSN 1155-1119..
- Nicolas Théobald (1948). "Carte de la base des formations alluviales dans le sud du fossé rhénan". Mémoires du Service de la Carte Géologique d'Alsace et de Lorraine (in French). 9 (1): (9):5–77, 9 cartes, 4 coupes, 1 planche. ISSN 0080-9020.
- Nicolas Théobald (1949). "Contribution à l'étude de la basse-terrasse rhénane". Bulletin de la Société Géologique de France (in French): (5), 19: 155–160. ISSN 0037-9409.
- Stégocéphales : Nicolas Théobald (1958). "Contribution à l'étude des Stégocéphales du Permien inférieur de la Sarre". Annales Universitatis Saraviensis, Sciences (in French): VII, (2): 192–210, 4 planches.
- Elephas : Nicolas Théobald (1958). "Elephas Trogontherii dans les alluvions anciennes du niveau de Griesheim (Bas-Rhin)". Bulletin du Service de la Carte Géologique d'Alsace et de Lorraine (in French). 11 (2): T. 11, (2):21–24), 1 fig. doi:10.3406/sgeol.1958.1180. ISSN 0037-2560.

=== Common articles ===
- Piton, L.; Théobald, Nicolas (1939). "Poissons, crustacés et insectes fossiles de l'Oligocène du Puy-de-Mur (Auvergne)". Mémoires de la Société des Sciences de Nancy (in French): 11–47, 28 fig., 2 pl. ISSN 0369-2183.
- Théobald, Nicolas; Cheviet, M. T. (1959). "Les Ammonites du Toarcien supérieur du Jura franc-comtois". Annales Scientifiques de l'Université de Besançon, (2), Géologie (in French): (9): 43–77, 17 figures, 3 planches. ISSN 0523-056X.
- Théobald, Nicolas; Firtion, F. (1953). "Découvertes paléontologiques dans la plaine du Rhin à Wörth en Palatinat". Annales Universitatis Saraviensis (in French): II, (3):177–185, 3 planches. Nicolas Théobald et F. Firtion 1953.
- Théobald, Nicolas; Moine, H. (1959). "Les ammonites du Toarcien supérieur et de l'Aalénien du sentier de l'Ehn près d'Obernai (Bas-Rhin)". Bulletin du Service de la Carte Géologique d'Alsace et de Lorraine (in French). 12: t 12, fasc. 1, 1–36, 6 planches. doi:10.3406/sgeol.1959.1191. ISSN 0037-2560.
- Théobald, Nicolas; Szymanek, C. (1963). "Le crâne du Rhinocéros à narines cloisonnées des grottes de Rigney (Doubs)". Annales Scientifiques de l'Université de Besançon (2) Géologie (in French): fascicule 17:97–113. ISSN 0523-056X.

=== Common works ===
- Théobald, Nicolas; Gama, Adrien (1956). Géologie générale et Pétrographie (in French). Paris: Doin, Deren et Cie. pp. 304 pp, 157 fig., 12 planches.
- Géologie : Théobald, Nicolas; Gama, Adrien (1969). Géologie générale et Pétrologie, Éléments de géodynamique (in French). Paris: Doin, Deren et Cie. pp. 586 pp, 234 fig., 16 planches. Géologie Générale et Pétrologie, Éléments de Géodynamique..
- Paléontologie : Théobald, Nicolas; Gama, Adrien (1969). Paléontologie : éléments de paléobiologie ([2e éd. revue et mise à jour]) (in French). Paris: Doin, Deren et Cie. p. 584. OCLC 489626848.
- Stratigraphie : Théobald, Nicolas; Gama, Adrien (1969). Stratigraphie: éléments de géologie historique (in French). Doin, Deren et Cie. ISBN 978-2-7040-0134-7.

== Bibliography ==
=== Works by other authors ===
- Henri Baulig (1935). Quelques problèmes de morphologie vosgienne. L'Alsace géologique, géographique et géophysique, Bibliothèque Jean Macé (in French). pp. I:13–22.
- Pierre Bonnet (2019). Le Lac. J'en ai rêvé (in French). Imprimerie Repro-System, Vesoul. p. 158.
- Cadiot, B.; Mayer-Rosa, D.; Vogt, J. (December 1979). Le séisme bâlois de 1356. Les tremblements de terre en France, sous la direction de Jean Vogt. Orléans, Mémoire du Bureau de Recherches Géologiques et Minières (in French). Vol. 96. p. 224. B. Cadiot, D. Mayer-Rosa, J. Vogt 1979.
- Johannes Ernst Wilhelm Deecke (1917). Geologie von Baden, T. 2 Tektonik (in German). Berlin, Gebr. Borntraeger.
- Camille Maire (2000). La promotion 1920–1923: Première promotion française de l'École Normale de Montigny (PDF). les Cahiers Lorrains, N°4, 2000 (in French). Société d'histoire et d'archéologie de la Lorraine. pp. 515–522. Archived from the original (pdf) on 2022-02-01.

=== Articles by other authors ===
- Henriette Alimen (1973). "Compte-rendu de : N. Théobald, Fondements géologiques de la Préhistoire". Bulletin de la Société préhistorique française, Comptes-rendus des séances mensuelles (in French). 70 (2): vol 70 (2):42. ISSN 0249-7638.
- Blaison, J.; Campy, M.; Contini, D.; Rangheard, Y. (1973). "Jubilé scientifique de Nicolas Théobald". Annales Scientifiques de l'Université de Besançon, 3e série, Géologie, fasc. 18 (in French): 7–8. ISSN 0523-056X.
- Abel Briquet (1928). "La terrasse à berge haute du Rhin moyen". Bulletin du Service de la Carte Géologique d'Alsace et de Lorraine (in French). 1 (3): T. 1 (3): 263–268, 2 fig., pl. X. doi:10.3406/sgeol.1928.1094. ISSN 0037-2560.
- Abel Briquet (1930). "Le Quaternaire de l'Alsace". Bulletin de la Société Géologique de France (in French). 4: XXX: 977–1014. ISSN 0037-9409.
- Roger Clément (1927). "Un compte d'un briquetier gallo-romain du pays de la Moselle". Revue des Études anciennes (in French). 29 (2): (29), 2:205–207, 1 fig. doi:10.3406/rea.1927.2445. ISSN 0035-2004.
- Mireille Darmois-Théobald (1973). "Paléontologie et écologie dans l'œuvre de N. Théobald. in " Recueil de travaux dédiés au Professeur N. Théobald "". Annales Scientifiques de l'Université de Besançon, 3e série, Géologie, fasc. 18 (in French): 19–22, 1 fig. ISSN 0523-056X.
- Darmois-Théobald, Mireille; Rangheard, Yves (1987). "Une page de l'histoire de la néotectonique : les premiers travaux de Nicolas Théobald sur les terrasses rhénanes". Annales Scientifiques de l'Université de Besançon, 4e série, Géologie, fasc. 8 (in French): 55–65, 6 fig. OCLC 490154370..
- A. Gutzwiller (1912). "Die Gliederung der diluvialen Schotter in der Umgebung von Basel". Verh. Der Naturf. Ges. In Basel (in German): Band XXIII: 57–75.
- A. Gutzwiller (1894). "Diluvialbildungen der Umgebung von Basel". Verh. Der Naturf. Ges. In Basel (in German): Band X: 512–688, 2pl.
- A. L. (A. Leopold?) (December 1937). "Review: Les Insectes Fossiles des Terrains Oligocènes de France by Nicolas Théobald". The Canadian Field-Naturalist: 137. ISSN 0008-3550.
- Rangheard, Yves (1982). "Vie et œuvre de Nicolas Théobald (1903–1981)". Annales Scientifiques de l'Université de Besançon (in French). 4 (4): 3–11, 1fig.
- Jean-Gérard Théobald (2001). "Souvenirs de la guerre 39-45". Revue lorraine populaire (in French): 159.
