= 1986 in France =

- Decades: 1960s; 1970s; 1980s; 1990s; 2000s
- See also: History of France; Timeline of French history; List of years in France

Events from the year 1986 in France.

== Incumbents ==
- President: François Mitterrand
- Prime Minister: Laurent Fabius (until 20 March), Jacques Chirac (starting 20 March)

== Events ==
- 20 January – The United Kingdom and France announce plans to construct the Channel Tunnel, which is hoped to be open in the early 1990s.
- 12 February – Treaty of Canterbury, Anglo-French Treaty on the Channel Tunnel, is signed.
- 16 February – The French Air Force raids the Libyan Ouadi Doum airbase in northern Chad.
- 21 February – Launch of the Renault 21 saloon and Nevada estate, which replace the Renault 18.
- 16 March – Legislative Election held.
- 16 March – Regional Elections held.
- 1 April – Le Parisien, the French national newspaper, causes a brief public outrage by reporting that the Eiffel Tower will be relocated from its location in the centre of Paris to the Euro Disney development site to the east of the city. It is quickly discovered to be an April Fools' Day joke.
- May – Production of Talbot passenger cars by Peugeot in France and Britain is discontinued; it is now restricted to commercial vehicles and to Spanish and Finnish production of the Horizon model, which is due to finish next year.
- June – The Renault 4 finishes production in France after 25 years and is switched to Argentina where it is set to continue into the early 1990s.
- 2 October – Launch of the Citroën AX supermini.
- 17 November – Georges Besse, 58-year-old head of carmaker Renault, is shot dead outside his mansion in Paris; left-wing extremists are suspected of his murder.
- 6 December - Johnny Hallyday released his 35th album Gang.

== Births ==
=== January to March ===
- 21 January – Julien Jousse, motor racing driver.
- 13 February – Arnaud Lescure, soccer player.
- 14 February – Djamel Abdoun, soccer player.
- 24 February – Sébastien Rouault, freestyle swimmer
- 28 February – Dieudonné Owona, soccer player.
- 5 March – Alexandre Barthe, soccer player.
- 8 March – Aurélien Collin, soccer player.
- 19 March – Clément Lhotellerie, cyclist.

=== April to June ===
- 15 April – Sylvain Marveaux, soccer player.
- 8 May – Marie de Villepin, socialite, model and actress.
- 11 May – Abou Diaby, soccer player.
- 21 May – Guillaume Loriot, soccer player.
- 13 June – DJ Snake, music producer
- 18 June – Richard Gasquet, tennis player.
- 20 June – Mathieu Coutadeur, soccer player.
- 21 June – Alexandre Raineau, soccer player.
- 25 June – Guillaume Quellier, soccer player.

=== July to September ===
- 3 July – Romain Danzé, soccer player.
- 9 July – Sébastien Bassong, soccer player.
- 11 July – Jean-Christophe Napoléon, claimant to headship of the House of Bonaparte.
- 12 July – Didier Digard, soccer player.
- 27 July – François Braud, Nordic combined skier.
- 6 August – Jérôme Coppel, cyclist.
- 7 August – Alexis Allart, soccer player.
- 9 August – Romain Brégerie, soccer player.
- 11 August – Zoumana Bakayogo, soccer player.
- 13 August – Xavier Pentecôte, soccer player.
- 17 August – Julien Quercia, soccer player.
- 19 August – Arnaud Brocard, soccer player.
- 20 August
  - Pernelle Carron, ice dancer.
  - Damien Gaudin, cyclist.
- 1 September – Jean Sarkozy, regional councillor, son of President of France, Nicolas Sarkozy.
- 11 September – Cédric Avinel, soccer player.
- 16 September – Gaëtan Belaud, soccer player.

=== October to December ===
- 9 October – Laure Manaudou, swimmer.
- 10 October – Pierre Rolland, cyclist.
- 17 October – Alexandre Bonnet, soccer player.
- 1 November – Arnaud Mignardi, rugby union player.
- 16 November – Maxime Médard, rugby union player.
- 11 November – François Trinh-Duc, rugby union player.
- 17 November – Alexis Vastine, boxer.
- 30 November – Abdoulaye Baldé, soccer player.
- 26 December – Hugo Lloris, football goalkeeper.

== Deaths ==
=== January to March ===
- 8 January – Pierre Fournier, cellist (born 1906).
- 9 January – Michel de Certeau, Jesuit and scholar (born 1925).
- 11 January – Roger Trinquier, army officer (born 1908).
- 12 January – Marcel Arland, novelist, literary critic and journalist (born 1899).
- 14 January
  - Daniel Balavoine, singer and songwriter (born 1952).
  - Thierry Sabine, motor cycle racer (born 1949).
- 23 January – Yvonne Lefébure, pianist (born 1898).
- 19 February – André Leroi-Gourhan, archaeologist, paleontologist, paleoanthropologist and anthropologist (born 1911).
- 22 February – Jacques Pâris de Bollardière, General (born 1907).
- 23 March – Étienne Mattler, international soccer player (born 1905).

=== April to June ===
- 14 April – Simone de Beauvoir, author and philosopher (born 1908).
- 15 April – Jean Genet, writer and political activist (born 1910).
- 17 April – Marcel Dassault, aircraft industrialist (born 1892).
- 24 April – Wallis, Duchess of Windsor wife of Prince Edward, Duke of Windsor(formally King Edward VIII)(born 1896 in the United States).
- 29 April – Henri de France, pioneering television inventor (born 1911).
- 7 May – Gaston Defferre, politician (born 1910).
- 5 June – Henri Michel, historian (born 1907).
- 16 June
  - Christian Beullac, politician and Minister (born 1923).
  - Maurice Duruflé, composer and organist (born 1902).
- 19 June – Coluche, comedian and actor (born 1944).

=== July to September ===
- 1 July – Jean Baratte, soccer player and manager (born 1923).
- 14 July – Raymond Loewy, industrial designer (born 1893).
- 17 July – Pierre Langlais, military officer (born 1909).
- 14 August – Pierre Bertaux, Germanist (born 1907).
- 15 August – Louis Peglion, cyclist (born 1906).
- 9 September – Albert Malet, painter (born 1912).
- 12 September – Jacques Henri Lartigue, photographer and painter (born 1894).

=== October to December ===
- 11 October – Georges Dumézil, philologist (born 1898).
- 26 October – Marcel Simon, historian (born 1907).
- 1 November – Pierre Repp, humorist and actor (born 1909).
- 13 November – Thierry Le Luron, impersonator and humorist (born 1952).
- 17 November – Georges Besse, businessman, assassinated (born 1927).
- 27 November – Philippe Viannay, journalist (born 1917).
- 27 December – André Cailleux, paleontologist and geologist (born 1907).

=== Full date unknown ===
- Jacques Baron, poet (born 1905).
- Roger Trézel, bridge player (born 1918).

== See also ==
- List of French films of 1986
