= 1991 in France =

- Decades: 1970s; 1980s; 1990s; 2000s; 2010s
- See also: History of France; Timeline of French history; List of years in France

Events from the year 1991 in France.

== Incumbents ==
- President: François Mitterrand
- Prime Minister: Michel Rocard (until 15 May), Édith Cresson (starting 15 May)

== Events ==
- 16 March – Official launch of the Citroen ZX. It partly replaces the larger BX, which will be completely replaced within the next two years by a larger model.
- 15 May – Édith Cresson becomes France's first female premier.
- 29 May – Olympique Marseille lose the European Cup final to Yugoslav champions Red Star Belgrade on penalties after a 0–0 draw in Bari, Italy.
- 5 September – Peugeot launches the all-new 106 supermini, designed as a marginally smaller alternative to the eight-year-old 205, which is expected to be phased out after the launch of a larger Peugeot which will replace the 309 in early 1993.
- Pommeau is granted its Appellation d'origine contrôlée.

== Sport ==
- 6 July – Tour de France begins.
- 7 July – French Grand Prix is won by Nigel Mansell of the United Kingdom.
- 28 July – Tour de France ends, won by Miguel Indurain of Spain.

== Births ==
- 3 January – Sébastien Faure, footballer
- 9 February – Alexandre Briancon, figure skater
- 10 February – Romain Wattel, golfer
- 6 May – Ribar Baikoua, basketball player
- 28 May
  - Jonathan Ligali, soccer player
  - Alexandre Lacazette, soccer player
- 1 July – Kev Adams, comedian, actor, humorist, screenwriter and film producer
- 6 July – Victoirre Thivisol, actress.
- 16 July – Valentin Lavillenie, pole vaulter.
- 7 August – Lénora Guion-Firmin, sprinter
- 30 August – Gaia Weiss, model and actress.
- 1 October – Thomas Trauttmann, basketball player
- 14 October – Robin Buffet, alpine skier

== Deaths ==
=== January to March ===
- 7 January – Henri Louveau, motor racing driver (born 1910).
- 9 January – Roland Laudenbach, writer, editor, and journalist (born 1921).
- 30 January – Marcel Galey, footballer (born 1905).
- 24 February – Georges Capdeville, soccer referee (born 1899).
- 2 March – Serge Gainsbourg, poet, singer-songwriter, actor and director (born 1928).
- 12 March – Étienne Decroux, actor and mime (born 1898).
- 25 March – Marcel Lefebvre, Roman Catholic archbishop (born 1905).
- 29 March – Guy Bourdin, photographer (born 1928).
- 30 March – Silvia Monfort, actress and theatre director (born 1923).

=== April to June ===
- 3 April – Robert Veyron-Lacroix, harpsichordist and pianist (born 1922).
- 6 April – Louis Joxe, statesman and Minister (born 1901).
- 26 April – Leo Arnaud, composer of film scores (born 1904).
- 30 April – André Badonnel, entomologist (born 1898).
- 30 April – Ghislaine Marie Françoise Dommanget, actress and Princess of Monaco (born 1900).
- 8 May – Jean Langlais, composer and organist (born 1907).
- 20 May – Michel Gauquelin, psychologist and statistician (born 1928).
- 7 June – Antoine Blondin, writer (born 1922).
- 10 June – Jean Bruller, writer and illustrator (born 1902).
- 28 June – Jacques Corrèze, businessman and politician (born 1912).
- 29 June – Henri Lefebvre, sociologist and philosopher (born 1901).

=== July to September ===
- 27 July – Pierre Brunet, figure skater (born 1902).
- 29 July – Christian de Castries, military officer (born 1902).
- 5 August – Gaston Litaize, organist and composer (born 1909).
- 28 August – Pierre Guillaumat, politician and Minister (born 1909).
- 4 September – Henri de Lubac, Jesuit priest and theologian (born 1896).
- 5 September – Raymond Dronne, politician (born 1908).
- 17 September – Zino Francescatti, violinist (born 1902).
- 28 September – Eugène Bozza, composer (born 1905).

=== October to December ===
- 9 November – Yves Montand, actor and singer (born 1921).
- 15 November – Jacques Morali, music producer (born 1947).
- 18 November – Claude Cahen, orientalist (born 1909).
- 26 November – François Billetdoux, playwright and novelist (born 1927).
- 9 December – Gisèle Lestrange, graphic artist (born 1927).
- 13 December – André Pieyre de Mandiargues, writer (born 1909).
- 20 December – Gaston Waringhien, linguist, lexicographer and Esperantist (born 1901).
- 27 December – Hervé Guibert, writer (born 1955).

=== Full date unknown ===
- Antoine Berman, translator and historian (born 1942).
- Louis Henry, historian (born 1911).

== See also ==
- List of French films of 1991
