= Ribar =

Ribar is both a surname and a given name. As a surname, in Croatian, Macedonian, and Bulgarian languages it literally means "fisherman".

Notable people with the name include:

- Frank Ribar
- Ivan Ribar
- Ivo Lola Ribar
- Ribar Baikoua

== See also ==
- Rebar
