= Boisson =

Boisson is a French surname meaning "drink". Notable people with the surname include:

- Andrée Boisson (1900–1973), French fencer
- Christine Boisson (born 1956), French actress
- Francis Boisson (1928–2021), Monegasque sport shooter
- Loïs Boisson (born 2003), French tennis player
- Noëlle Boisson (born 1944), French film editor
- Pierre Boisson (1894–1948), French civil servant, colonial administrator, and the Governor General of French Equatorial Africa and French West Africa

== See also ==
- Boissonnat
