= 1990 in France =

- Decades: 1970s; 1980s; 1990s; 2000s; 2010s
- See also: History of France; Timeline of French history; List of years in France

Events from the year 1990 in France.

== Incumbents ==
- President: François Mitterrand
- Prime Minister: Michel Rocard

== Events ==
- 15 May – Launch of the Renault Clio supermini, which will eventually replace the Renault 5.
- 13 July – Loi Gayssot enacted, prohibiting Holocaust denial.
- 14 July – Jean-Michel Jarre performs Paris La Défense – Une Ville En Concert before a world record audience of 2.5 million people.
- 27 July – Citroën ends production of its 2CV after 42 years.
- December – Espace Euro Disney, an information hub on the under construction Euro Disney resort near Paris, is opened to the public.
- 1 December – Channel Tunnel workers from the United Kingdom and France meet 40 metres beneath the English Channel seabed.

== Sport ==
- 30 June – Tour de France begins.
- 8 July – French Grand Prix won by Alain Prost.
- 22 July – Tour de France ends, won by Greg LeMond of the United States.

== Births ==
- 6 January – Jonathan Matijas
- 10 January – Richard Philippe, motor racing driver.
- 22 January – Alizé Cornet, tennis player.
- 29 January – Francois Civil, actor
- 13 February – Mamadou Sakho, footballer
- 15 February – Charles Pic, motor racing driver.
- 10 March – César Domboy, actor
- 18 March – Ines Rau, transgender model
- 20 March – Stacy Martin, actress
- 26 March – Romain Saïss, Footballer
- 12 April – Ciryl Gane, mixed martial artist
- 19 April – Damien Le Tallec, footballer
- 20 May – Adeline Canac, pair skater.
- 4 June – Tippi Degré, animal handler.
- 11 June – Christophe Lemaitre, sprinter
- 12 June – Jérôme Jarre, vine star.
- 13 July – Alizé Lim, tennis player
- 16 July – Johann Zarco, motorcycle racer
- 20 July – Wendie Renard, footballer
- 12 August – Wissam Ben Yedder, footballer.
- 13 August – Benjamin Stambouli, footballer
- 19 September – Josuha Guilavogui, footballer
- 21 October – Maxime Vachier-Lagrave, chess grandmaster.
- 9 November – Romain Bardet, racing cyclist
- 12 November – Florent Manaudou, swimmer
- 25 November – Anouchka Delon, French-Dutch actress
- 22 December – Jean-Baptiste Maunier, actor and singer.

== Deaths ==
=== January to March ===
- 10 January – Juliet Berto, actress (b. 1947).
- 16 January – Robert Lamartine, soccer player (b. 1935).
- 17 January – Charles Hernu, politician and Minister (b. 1923).
- 5 February – Père Marie-Benoît, friar who helped smuggle Jews to safety from Nazi-occupied Southern France (b. 1895).
- 5 February – Joseph Mauclair, cyclist (b. 1906).
- 15 February – Michel Drach, film director, writer, producer and actor (b. 1930).
- 7 March – Claude Arrieu, composer (b. 1903).
- 12 March – Philippe Soupault, poet, novelist, critic and political activist (b. 1897).
- 17 March – Capucine, actress (b. 1928).
- 20 March – Maurice Cloche, film director, screenwriter and film producer (b. 1907).

=== April to June ===
- 21 April – Romain de Tirtoff, artist and designer (b. 1892).
- 30 June – Jacques Lob, comic book creator (b. 1932).

=== July to September ===
- 18 July – Yves Chaland, cartoonist (b. 1957).
- 23 July – Pierre Gandon, illustrator and engraver of postage stamps (b. 1899).
- 25 July – Jean Fourastié, economist (b. 1907).
- 27 July – René Toribio, Guadeloupean politician (b. 1912).
- 1 August – Michel Arnaud, General (b. 1915).
- 6 August – Jacques Soustelle, anthropologist (b. 1912).
- 15 August – Louis Vola, double bass player (b. 1902).
- 20 August – Maurice Gendron, cellist and teacher (b. 1920).
- 30 September – Michel Leiris, surrealist writer and ethnographer (b. 1901).

=== October to December ===
- 20 October – Colette Audry, novelist, screenwriter and critic (b. 1906).
- 22 October – Louis Althusser, Marxist philosopher (b. 1918).
- 27 October – Jacques Demy, film director (b. 1931).
- October – Alfred Sauvy, demographer, anthropologist and historian (b. 1898).
- 5 November – Raymond Oliver, chef and restaurateur (b. 1909).
- 17 November – Pierre Braunberger, producer and actor (b. 1905).
- 1 December – Simone Melchior, wife and business partner of Jacques-Yves Cousteau (b. 1919).
- 18 December – Paul Tortelier, cellist and composer (b. 1914).
- 19 December – Edmond Delfour, international soccer player, manager (b. 1907).
- 23 December – Serge Danot, animator (b. 1931).
- 23 December – Pierre Gripari, writer (b. 1925).

=== Full date unknown ===
- Jacques-Laurent Bost, journalist (b. 1916).
- Daniel du Janerand, painter (b. 1919).
- Marcel Légaut, philosopher and mathematician (b. 1900).
- Claude Ponsard, economist (b. 1927).

== See also ==
- List of French films of 1990
