= Thomas Trauttmann =

French basketball player (born 1991)

Thomas Trauttmann (born 1 October 1991) is a French basketball player who plays for French Pro A League club SIG Strasbourg. He was born in Mulhouse.

== See also ==
- Basketball in France
