= 1989 in France =

- Decades: 1960s; 1970s; 1980s; 1990s; 2000s
- See also: History of France; Timeline of French history; List of years in France

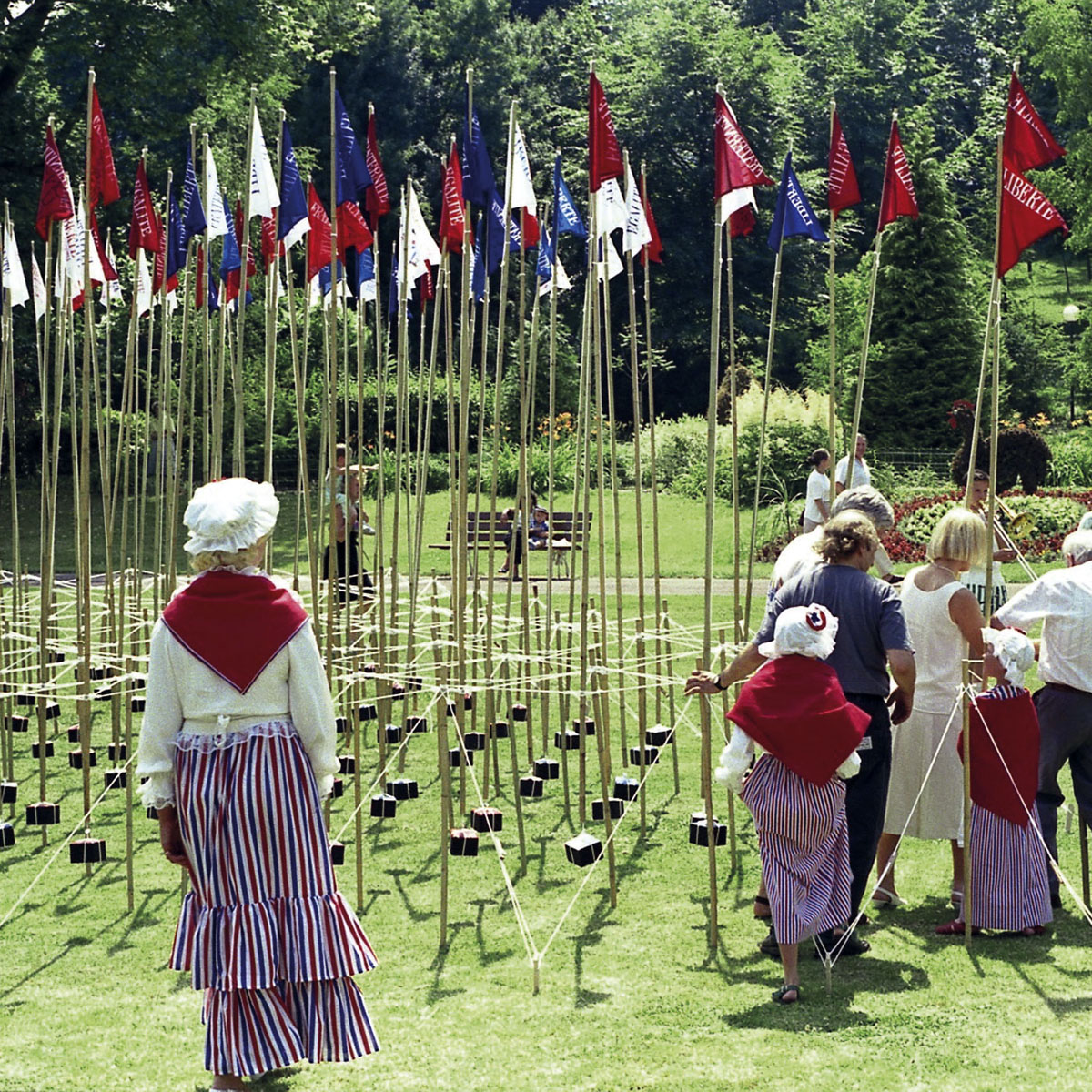

This article lists events from the year 1989 in France.

== Incumbents ==
- President: François Mitterrand
- Prime Minister: Michel Rocard

== Events ==
- January – Two women, Nathalie Menigon and Joelle Aubron (both member of left-wing extremist group Action Directe), are found guilty of murdering Renault owner Georges Besse, who was shot dead in Paris November 1986. They are both sentenced to life imprisonment, as are Jean-Marc Rouillan and Georges Cipriani who are found guilty of being accomplices.
- 12 March – Municipal Elections held.
- 19 March – Municipal Elections held.
- 29 March – The glass pyramids, designed by Chinese-American artist I.M. Pei, are unveiled at the entrance of the Louvre in Paris.
- 23 May – Citroën launches the all-new XM executive car, a replacement for the 15-year-old CX.
- 15 June – European Parliament Election held.
- 14 July – France celebrates the 200th anniversary of the French Revolution.
- 14 July – 15th G7 summit at the Grande Arche in Paris begins.
- 16 July – 15th G7 summit ends.
- 19 September – UTA Flight 772 broke up over the Sahara Desert following an explosion. 156 passengers and 14 crew were killed.
- November – The Citroën XM is voted European Car of the Year.

== Births ==
- 2 January – Romain Dedola, footballer.
- 8 January – Dominique Malonga, soccer player.
- 7 February – Marc de Fleurian, politician.
- 10 February – Kévin Aubeneau, soccer player.
- 26 February – Gabriel Obertan, soccer player.
- 16 March – Gabriel Attal, politician, prime minister
- 6 April – Djamel Bakar, soccer player.
- 23 April – François Letexier, FIFA football referee
- 8 May – Nora Arnezeder, actress.
- 3 June – Anthony Taugourdeau, soccer player.
- 8 June - Amaury Vassili, operatic tenor.
- 18 June - Pierre-Emerick Emiliano François Aubameyang, soccer player.
- 3 July – Jean-Armel Kana-Biyik, soccer player.
- 18 July – Yohan Mollo, footballer.
- 3 August – Jules Bianchi, Formula One driver (d. 2015)
- 16 August – Moussa Sissoko, soccer player.
- 4 September – Antoine Léaument, politician.
- 25 September – Julie Delpech, politician.
- 8 October – Armand Traoré, soccer player.
- 23 October – Justine Gruet, politician.
- 10 November – Parfait Mandanda, soccer player.
- 17 December – André Ayew, soccer player.

== Deaths ==
=== January to March ===
- 5 February – André Cheuva, soccer player (born 1908).
- 6 February – André Cayatte, filmmaker (born 1909).
- 7 February – Gilbert Simondon, philosopher (born 1924).
- 13 February – Claude Dupuy, Roman Catholic archbishop (born 1901).
- 17 February – Guy Laroche, fashion designer (born 1921).
- 21 February – Alex Thépot, international soccer player (born 1906).
- 8 March – Robert Lacoste, politician (born 1898).
- 15 March – Valérie Quennessen, actress (born 1957).
- 29 March – Bernard Blier, actor (born 1916).
- 29 March – Fernand Gambiez, General and military historian (born 1903).

=== April to June ===
- 6 April – Henri Cadiou, painter and lithographer (born 1906).
- 15 April – Charles Vanel, film director and actor (born 1892).
- 19 April – Dimitri Bouclier, classical accordion performer (born 1989).
- 30 April – Pierre Lewden, athlete (born 1901).
- 25 May – Jean Despeaux, boxer, Olympic gold-medallist (born 1915).
- 22 June – Henri Sauguet, composer (born 1901).

=== July to September ===
- 2 July – Jean Painlevé, film director (born 1902).
- 5 July – Jean Leguay, civil servant, accomplice of the Deportation of Jews from France (born 1909).
- 6 July – Jean Bouise, actor (born 1931).
- 17 July – Suzanne Dechevaux-Dumesnil, lover and later wife of Samuel Beckett (born 1900).
- 20 July – Marie-Madeleine Fourcade, French Resistance leader (born 1909).
- 4 September – Georges Simenon, writer (born 1903).
- 8 September – Vincent Badie, lawyer and politician (born 1902).

=== October to December ===
- 14 November – Rémi Laurent, actor (born 1957).
- 23 November – Armand Salacrou, dramatist (born 1899).
- 31 December – Lilly Daché, milliner and fashion designer (born 1898).

=== Full date unknown ===
- Bernard-Marie Koltès, playwright and director (born 1948).
- Jean-Etienne Marie, composer (born 1917).
- André Muffang, chess master (born 1897).
- Jean-Louis Verdier, mathematician (born 1935).
