= Verset laïque et somptueux =

Composition by Erik Satie

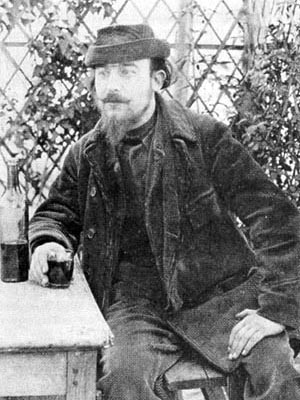
Erik Satie

Verset laïque et somptueux (Secular and Sumptuous Verse) is a pièce d'occasion for piano composed in 1900 by Erik Satie. With it he bid an ironic farewell to the style of his "Rosicrucian" or "mystic" period, which he ultimately dismissed as "musique à genoux" ("music on its knees"). It was written for an ephemeral publication and never performed in Satie's lifetime.

== Description ==
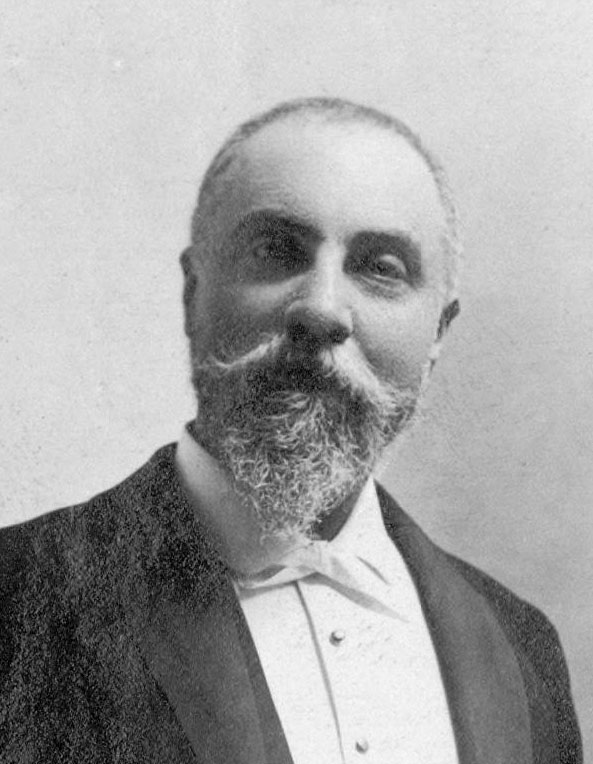
Charles Malherbe

The Verset laïque et somptueux was one of two little works Satie produced in connection with the 1900 Paris Exposition. Musicologist Charles Malherbe, acting in his position as chief librarian of the Paris Opera, chose to commemorate the event by compiling the Autographes de Musiciens Contemporains 1900, a special collection of composers' manuscripts representing current French music. Satie was invited to contribute something to this anthology which, considering the source, he must have accepted with a feeling of vindication. His previous dealings with the Paris Opera (in 1892) were to force director Eugène Bertrand to look at one of his scores by challenging him to a duel. Things went more smoothly this time and Satie's one-page manuscript facsimile duly appeared in the Autographes de Musiciens, topped by a drawing of Paris and the Seine and the score itself bordered with laurel leaves. A copy of this book can still be found in the Paris Opera Library.

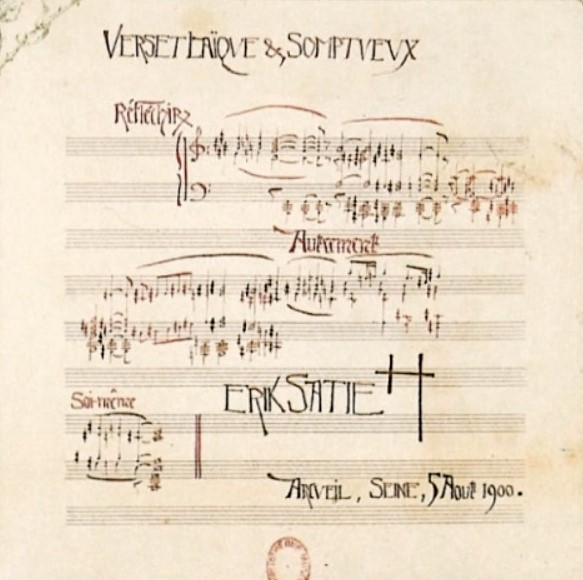
Facsimile of Satie's autograph score.

Formally dated "Arcueil, Seine, 5 August 1900", the Verset laïque et somptueux was the only piece in the old Rose + Croix style (1891–95) that Satie composed at his new home in Arcueil, 10 kilometers (6.2 miles) south of Paris, where he had moved in October 1898. This period saw him reexamining his creative past (the Gnossiennes), either out of nostalgia for his early Montmartre days or searching for clues to a new stylistic beginning. The minute-long Verset has the characteristics of the "religious mystic" music: slow reflective tempo, expansive chordal writing, harmonic modality. It is built of seven phrases of unequal length, unified by transpositions of the opening three chords.

With its pseudo-Gothic calligraphy the look of Satie's autograph score is also period correct, and for the last time he signed his name with the emblem of his defunct church, the Metropolitan Church of Art of Jesus the Conductor – a Greek cross and Latin cross linked together. The irony of this personal adieu surfaces mostly in the minimal text and hints at deeper things. "Secular and Sumptuous Verse" may be an incongruous title here but is an apt reference to Satie's career in 1900, when he was miserable as a jobbing cabaret songwriter – quite the comedown from his self-styled role as leader (and sole member) of his own religious sect.

The work's three playing directions, Réfléchir, Autrement and Soi-même, can roughly be translated together as "Think differently of yourself". And in the penultimate phrase (after the Autrement) the music gets in the final dig by hinting at the Airs à faire fuir from the Pièces froides (1897) – "Tunes to Make You Run Away".

Irony also figures in Satie's second (purely literary) contribution to the Paris Expo, "The Musicians of Montmartre" (1900), his idea of a puff piece for a tourist's guide to The Butte. Although he was closely involved with the subject, Satie spends most of the article making elaborate excuses for why he can't write the article, and simply invites readers to experience Montmartre's cabarets for themselves. He concludes, "The fact that music gives no pleasure to the deaf, even those who are mute, is no reason for ignoring it".

Robert Orledge edited a performing edition of the Verset laïque et somptueux, published by Salabert in 1995.

== Recordings ==
Jean-Pierre Armengaud (Le Chant Du Monde, 1986), Aldo Ciccolini (EMI, 1988), Cristina Ariagno (Brilliant Classics, 1994), Bojan Gorišek (Audiophile, 1994), Olof Höjer (Swedish Society Discofil, 1996), Jean-Yves Thibaudet (Decca, 2003), Steffen Schleiermacher (MDG, 2003), Alessandro Simonetto (Aevea, 2016, 2021), Dunanduan Hao (Naxos, 2018), Nicolas Horvath (Grand Piano, 2019).
