= Boissonnat =

Boissonnat (English: /bwɑːsəˈnɑː/, French: [bwasɔna]) is a French surname. Notable people with the surname include:

- Jean Boissonnat (1929–2016), French economic journalist
- Jean-Daniel Boissonnat, French computer scientist

== See also ==
- Boisson
