= Madame Bovary (1991 film) =

1991 film by Claude Chabrol

- Directed by: Claude Chabrol
- Screenplay by: Claude Chabrol
- Based on: Madame Bovary; 1857 novel by Gustave Flaubert
- Produced by: Marin Karmitz
- Starring: Isabelle Huppert; Jean-François Balmer; Christophe Malavoy; Jean Yanne
- Cinematography: Jean Rabier
- Edited by: Monique Fardoulis
- Music by: Jean-Michel Bernard; Matthieu Chabrol; Maurice Coignard
- Distributed by: MK2 Diffusion
- Release date: 3 April 1991
- Running time: 143 minutes
- Country: France
- Language: French

Madame Bovary is a 1991 French drama film directed by Claude Chabrol and based on the 1857 novel Madame Bovary by French author Gustave Flaubert.

Set in Normandy in the 1850s, the film follows the story of Emma Bovary, an attractive young woman full of romantic notions, whose marriage to an unexciting country doctor leads her to adulterous affairs and tragedy.

== Plot ==
Facing spinsterhood on her widowed father's farm Emma, with the help of her father, is successful in attracting and contracting a marriage with the local doctor, whose wife has recently died. Charles Bovary is kindly and conscientious, but lacks assertiveness and is a dull conversationalist. Following an aristocratic ball she is more dissatisfied than ever and her husband, noticing this, moves to a larger town with potentially greater diversions, where he is befriended by the apothecary.

There she meets the law clerk Léon, with whom she can talk about art, literature, poetry and music. His attentions to her cause adverse comment and eventually prompt her to instead become more attentive to her husband and baby, but this leads her to become dissatisfied yet again. The parish priest is a poor listener and does not respond to her unhappiness. Léon, disappointed by her rejection, leaves to study in Paris, leaving her without congenial company.

After encountering her, the womanising landowner Rodolphe decides he would like an affair with her and, under the pretence of offering riding lessons, finds her more than willing. After four years, she demands that they run away together and, after he agrees, buys travelling clothes and luggage on credit; instead he writes her a farewell letter and leaves town.

She is in despair, until she discovers that Léon has found a job in the city of Rouen nearby. Under the pretence of having piano lessons, she takes the regular coach to Rouen and meets him in a hotel. To pay the cost of the coach fares, the hotel room, smart clothes to go to town and gifts to Léon, together with extravagant furnishings, she runs up debts with the conniving shopkeeper Lheureux. When he demands repayment, neither of her lovers will help and she cannot face the truth coming out. Bailiffs seize the contents of the house, which is put up for sale by court order, and a lawyer she consults wants sex in return for his help, which she rejects. After taking poison, she dies in prolonged agony. Her husband, devastated when he learns all that has happened, dies of grief. Their child ends up with a penniless aunt, who puts her to work in a factory.

== Cast ==
- Isabelle Huppert as Emma Bovary
- Jean-François Balmer as Charles Bovary
- Christophe Malavoy as Rodolphe Boulanger, the landowner
- Jean Yanne as Homais, the pharmacist
- Lucas Belvaux as Léon Dupuis, the law student
- Christiane Minazzoli as the widow Lefrançois
- Jean-Louis Maury as Lheureux, the shopkeeper
- Florent Gibassier as Hippolyte, the stable lad
- Jean-Claude Bouillaud as Rouault, Emma's father
- Sabeline Campo as Félicité, the maid
- Marie Mergey as Charles Bovary's mother
- François Maistre as Lieuvain, the lawyer
- Thomas Chabrol as the Viscount
- Jacques Dynam as Father Bournisien
- Henri Attal as Maître Hareng, the bailiff
- Dominique Zardi as the blind man
- Louis-Do de Lencquesaing

== Reception ==
Roger Ebert gave the film 3 stars out of 4 in his 1991 review. He particularly praised the performance of Isabelle Huppert: "...Chabrol was quite right to find Emma Bovary within her.... Who else could do so little and yet project such a burning need - such a cry for deliverance from the bondage of self?" Vincent Canby of the New York Times also gave a generally positive review and concluded that "Mr. Chabrol errs on the side of understatement. His Madame Bovary is not to be dismissed. It is so good in so many details that the wish is that it were better. See it. You won't be bored, but you may want to talk back to it."

On Rotten Tomatoes, the film holds a rating of 63% from 16 reviews.

It was nominated for the Golden Globe Award for Best Foreign Language Film as well as for the Academy Award for Best Costume Design. It was also entered into the 17th Moscow International Film Festival where Isabelle Huppert won the award for Best Actress.

== See also ==
- Isabelle Huppert on screen and stage
- List of French films of 1991
