= 1988 in France =

- Decades: 1960s; 1970s; 1980s; 1990s; 2000s
- See also: History of France; Timeline of French history; List of years in France

Events from the year 1988 in France.

== Incumbents ==
- President: François Mitterrand
- Prime Minister: Jacques Chirac (until 10 May), Michel Rocard (starting 10 May)

== Events ==
- 29 March – African National Congress representative Dulcie September assassinated in Paris.
- 22 April–5 May – The Ouvéa cave hostage taking takes place in Ouvéa, Loyalty Islands, New Caledonia.
- 24 April – Presidential Election held.
- 8 May – Presidential Election held, won by François Mitterrand.
- 5 June – Legislative Election held.
- 12 June – Legislative Election held.
- 26 June – Air France Flight 296 Airbus A320 crashes at an airshow at Mulhouse killing three passengers.
- 26 June – Matignon Accords referendum held.
- 27 June – Gare de Lyon train accident results in 56 deaths.
- 21 July – Renault launches the R19 hatchback range, which replaces the Renault 11 hatchback. A saloon model to replace the Renault 9 is expected soon.
- August – Construction begins on the Euro Disney resort and theme park east of Paris; it is expected to be open within three years.
- 26 August – Mehran Karimi Nasseri, "The terminal man", is stuck in Charles de Gaulle Airport in Paris, where he will continue to reside until 1 August 2006.
- 25 September – Cantonales Elections held.
- 2 October – Cantonales Elections held.
- 28 October – Abortion: 48 hours after announcing it was abandoning RU-486, French manufacturer Roussel Uclaf states that it would resume distribution of the drug, bowing to pressure from the Government of France.

== Births ==
=== January to March ===
- 5 January – Pauline, singer and songwriter.
- 16 January – Benoît Richaud, ice dancer.
- 25 January – Tatiana Golovin, tennis player.
- 7 February – Albin Hodža, footballer
- 12 February – Guillaume Borne, soccer player.
- 24 February
  - Mathieu Baudry, footballer
  - Rodrigue Beaubois, basketball player
- 27 February – Sandy Paillot, soccer player.
- 5 March – Damien Plessis, soccer player.
- 10 March – Kévin Olimpa, soccer player.
- 27 March – Quentin Othon, soccer player.
- 28 March – Mélodie Chataigner, pair skater.
- 31 March – Mickael Charvet, soccer player.

=== April to June ===
- 21 April – Ibrahima Traoré, soccer player.
- 4 May – Simon Pontdemé, soccer player.
- 18 May – Paul Baysse, soccer player.
- 26 May – Aurélien Saintoul, politician.
- 12 June – Matthias Lepiller, soccer player.
- 29 June – Adrian Mannarino, tennis player

=== July to September ===
- 4 July – Angélique Boyer, actress.
- 11 July – Étienne Capoue, soccer player.
- 14 July – Jérémy Stravius, swimmer
- 8 August – Flavia Bujor, novelist.
- 16 August – Christophe Pourcel, motocross rider.
- 18 August – Wilfried Domoraud, soccer player.
- 19 August – Kévin Monnet-Paquet, soccer player.
- 25 August – Malaury Martin, soccer player.
- 31 August – Rachel Legrain-Trapani, Miss France in 2007.
- 6 September – Jean-Yves Mvoto, soccer player.
- 16 September – Kim Lucine, figure skater.

=== October to December ===
- 26 October – Mehdi Rahmouni, football assistant referee
- 12 December – Kévin Bru, soccer player.
- 14 December – Nicolas Batum, basketball player.
- 15 December – Floyd Ayité, soccer player.

== Deaths ==
=== January to March ===
- 9 January – Thierry Maulnier, journalist, essayist, dramatist and literary critic (born 1909).
- 20 January – Philippe de Rothschild, motor racing driver, scriptwriter, film producer, poet and wine grower (born 1902).
- 2 February
  - Alain Savary, politician and Minister (born 1918).
  - René Massigli, diplomat (born 1888).
- 16 February – Charles Delaunay, author, jazz expert, co-founder and long-term leader of the Hot club de France (born 1911).
- 19 February – René Char, poet (born 1907).
- 19 February – André Frédéric Cournand, physician and physiologist, shared Nobel Prize in Physiology or Medicine in 1956 (born 1895).
- 6 March – Jeanne Aubert, singer and actress (born 1906).
- 19 March – Francis Lefebvre, physician (born 1916).
- 21 March – Germain Jousse, member of the French Resistance (born 1895).
- 30 March – Edgar Faure, politician, essayist, historian, and memoirist (born 1908).
- 31 March – Georges Lévis, comic artist (born 1924).

=== April to June ===
- 14 April – Daniel Guérin, anarchist and author (born 1904).
- 18 April – Pierre Desproges, humorist (born 1939).
- 24 May – Ernest Labrousse, historian (born 1895).
- 24 June – Pierre Jaïs, bridge player (born 1913).

=== July to September ===
- 15 July – Armand Mouyal, epee fencer (born 1925).
- 31 July – André Navarra, cellist and cello teacher (born 1911).
- 1 August – Louis-Jean Guyot, Cardinal (born 1907).
- 11 August
  - Pauline Lafont, actress (born 1963).
  - Jean-Pierre Ponnelle, opera director (born 1932).
- 20 August – Jean-Paul Aron, writer and journalist (born 1925).
- 25 August – Françoise Dolto, physician and psychoanalyst (born 1908).

=== October to December ===
- 14 October – René Vietto, cyclist (born 1914).
- 23 October – André Neher, Jewish scholar and philosopher (born 1914).
- 10 November – Jean Leray, mathematician (born 1906)
- 11 November – Émile Muller, politician (born 1915).
- 4 December – Fernand Mourlot, printer and publisher (born 1895).
- 13 December – André Jaunet, flautist (born 1911).
- 29 December – Émile Aillaud, architect (born 1902).

=== Full date unknown ===
- Serge Mouille, industrial designer and goldsmith (born 1922).
- Jules Semler-Collery, composer, conductor and teacher (born 1902).
