= List of French films of 1991 =

A list of films produced in France in 1991.

Title	Director	Cast	Genre	Notes
30 Door Key	Jerzy Skolimowski	Iain Glen, Robert Stephens, Crispin Glover	Drama	British–French–Polish co-production
Afraid of the Dark	Mark Peploe	James Fox, Fanny Ardant, Paul McGann	Thriller	British–French co-production
Les Amants du Pont-Neuf	Léos Carax	Juliette Binoche, Denis Lavant, Marie Trintignant	Romance, drama	
La Belle Noiseuse	Jacques Rivette	Michel Piccoli, Emmanuelle Béart, Jane Birkin	Drama	
Delicatessen	Marc Caro, Jean-Pierre Jeunet	Dominique Pinon, Marie-Laure Dougnac, Jean-Claude Dreyfus	Comedy	
Dingo	Rolf de Heer	Colin Friels, Miles Davis	Drama, music	Australian-French co-production
The Double Life of Véronique	Krzysztof Kieślowski	Irène Jacob, Wladyslaw Kowalski, Aleksander Bardini	Drama	French–Polish co-production
L'entraînement du champion avant la course	Bernard Favre			Screened at the 1991 Cannes Film Festival
Fortune Express	Olivier Schatzky			Entered into the 41st Berlin International Film Festival
Isabelle Eberhardt	Ian Pringle	Mathilda May, Peter O'Toole, Tcheky Karyo	Biography, drama	Australian-French co-production
Jacquot de Nantes	Agnès Varda			Screened at the 1991 Cannes Film Festival
J'embrasse pas	André Téchiné	Philippe Noiret	Drama	1 win & 3 nominations
Madame Bovary	Claude Chabrol	Isabelle Huppert		Entered into the 17th Moscow International Film Festival
Mayrig	Henri Verneuil	Claudia Cardinale, Omar Sharif	Drama	1 win & 1 nomination
A Mere Mortal (Simple mortel)	Pierre Jolivet	Philippe Volter, Christophe Bourseiller, Nathalie Roussel, Roland Giraud	Thriller	
Night and Day	Chantal Akerman	Guilaine Londez, Thomas Langmann	Drama	
Out of Life	Maroun Bagdadi			Won the Jury Prize at Cannes
The Secret of Sarah Tombelaine	Daniel Lacambre	Irène Jacob, Marc de Jonge, Jean-Paul Roussillon	Horror	
Tous les Matins du Monde	Alain Corneau	Jean-Pierre Marielle, Gérard Depardieu	Biography drama	Nomin. for Golden Globe, +8 wins, +5 nom.
Van Gogh	Maurice Pialat			Entered into the 1991 Cannes Film Festival
Venus and Lulu	Daniel Losset	Caroline Laurence, Maxime Boidron	Comedy	

== See also ==
- 1991 in France
