= Pierre Jamin =

French footballer (born 1987)

Personal information
- Full name: Pierre Jamin
- Date of birth: 13 March 1987 (age 39)
- Place of birth: Cholet, France
- Height: 1.80 m (5 ft 11 in)
- Position: Midfielder

Team information
- Current team: Union Sportive Crandelloise

Youth career
- 2001–2006: Chamois Niortais

Senior career*
Years	Team	Apps	(Gls)
2006–2010	Chamois Niortais	50	(8)
2008	→ Martigues (loan)	15	(1)
2010–2015	Les Herbiers	134	(28)
2015–2017	Bergerac	23	(1)
2017–	Aurillac	28	(2)
- * Club domestic league appearances and goals as of 11:44, 15 January 2019 (UTC)

Pierre Jamin (born 13 March 1987) is a French footballer who plays as a midfielder for départemental 1 side Crandelles.

== Career ==
Jamin started his career with Chamois Niortais, where he joined the youth team in 2001. Five years later, he was promoted to the senior squad and made his debut for the club on 11 May 2007, coming on as a substitute in the 2–1 win over US Créteil-Lusitanos in Ligue 2. During the 2007–08 campaign, he had a loan spell at FC Martigues, where he scored one goal in 15 league appearances. Jamin scored eight league goals in the 2009–10 season as Chamois Niortais won the CFA Group C to gain promotion to the Championnat National. However, he was released at the end of the campaign, and joined local rivals Les Herbiers on 3 June 2010.

== Career statistics ==
As of 7 March 2019

League appearances and goals by club and season
Club	Division	Season	League	
Club	Division	Season	Apps	Goals
Chamois Niortais	Ligue 2	2006–07	2	0
Chamois Niortais	Ligue 2	2007–08	8	0
Chamois Niortais	National	2008–09	8	0
Chamois Niortais	CFA Group C	2009–10	32	8
Chamois Niortais	Total		50	8
Martigues (loan)	National	2007–08	15	1
Les Herbiers	CFA Group C	2010–11	23	5
Les Herbiers	CFA Group C	2011–12	32	7
Les Herbiers	CFA Group C	2012–13	26	8
Les Herbiers	CFA Group C	2013–14	26	6
Les Herbiers	CFA Group C	2014–15	27	2
Les Herbiers	Total		134	28
Bergerac	CFA Group C	2015–16	18	1
Bergerac	CFA Group C	2016–17	5	0
Bergerac	Total		23	1
Aurillac	Championnat National 3	2017–18	18	2
Aurillac	Championnat National 3	2018–19	15	2
Aurillac	Total		33	4
Career total			255	42
