= Gauthier Diafutua =

French footballer (born 1985)

Personal information
- Full name: Bolomba Diafutua Ngudiangani
- Date of birth: 14 November 1985 (age 40)
- Place of birth: Levallois-Perret, France
- Height: 1.81 m (5 ft 11 1/2 in)
- Position: Striker

Youth career
- 2003–2005: Watford

Senior career*
Years	Team	Apps	(Gls)
2005–2006	Cherbourg	24	(2)
2006–2007	Mons	8	(0)
2007	Dender	12	(2)
2007–2009	Tubize	32	(1)
2009–2011	Sète	?	(?)
2011–2012	Bayonne	35	(6)
2012–2013	Quevilly	32	(2)
2013–2014	Namur	2	(0)
2014	Oissel	10	(2)
- * Club domestic league appearances and goals

Bolomba Diafutua Ngudiangani (born 14 November 1985), commonly known as Gauthier Diafutua, is a French former professional footballer who played as a striker.

== Career ==
Amongst his former teams are Watford, AS Cherbourg, and Belgian sides RAEC Mons, FCV Dender and A.F.C. Tubize.
