= Jérémy Gavanon =

French footballer (born 1983)

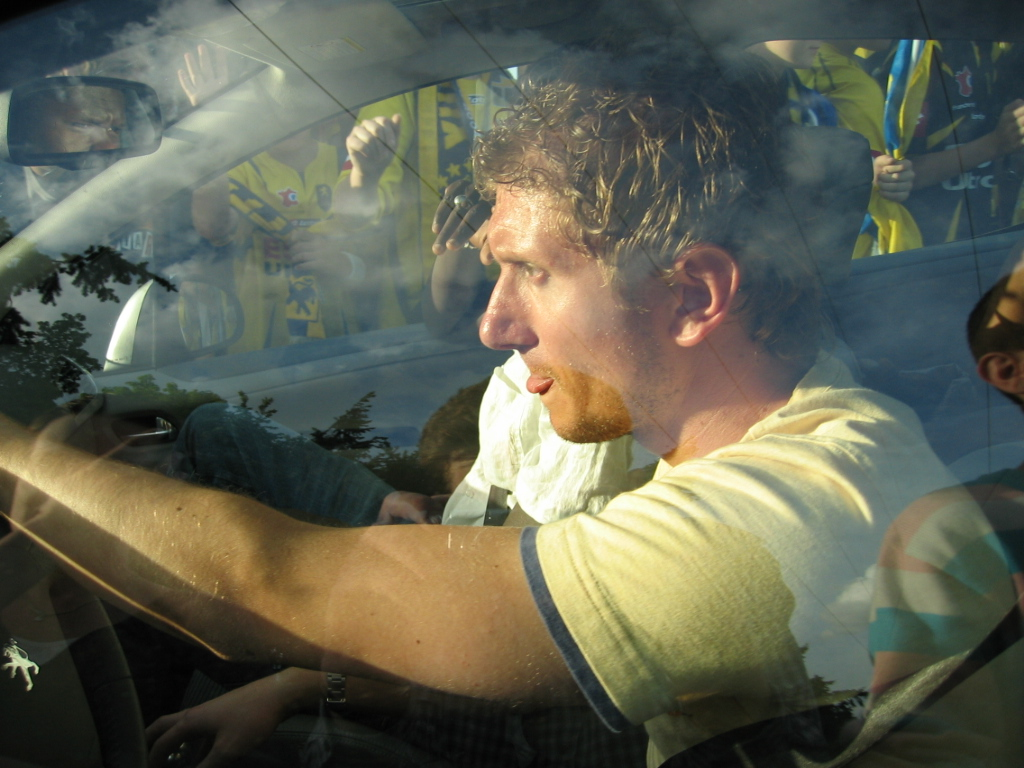
- Gavanon in 2007

Personal information
- Date of birth: 20 September 1983 (age 43)
- Place of birth: Marseille, France
- Height: 1.82 m (6 ft 0 in)
- Position: Goalkeeper

Youth career
- 1992–1993: SO de Septèmes
- 1993–2002: Marseille

Senior career*
| Years | Team | Apps | (Gls) |
| 2002–2006 | Marseille | 10 | (0) |
| 2005–2006 | → Clermont (loan) | 22 | (0) |
| 2006–2009 | Sochaux | 6 | (0) |
| 2009–2014 | Cannes | 142 | (0) |
| Total | | 169 | (0) |

International career
| 2004–2006 | France U21 | 19 | (0) |
- * Club domestic league appearances and goals

Jérémy Gavanon (born 20 September 1983) is a French former professional footballer who played as a goalkeeper. An Olympique de Marseille youth product, he made his professional debut with the club in 2002. Following a loan at Clermont Foot and a three-year stint with FC Sochaux in which he rarely featured, Gavanon went on to make 142 league appearances for AS Cannes in five years.

== Club career ==
Born in Marseille, Gavanon signed a professional contract with Olympique de Marseille in the summer of 2003, and made his first start for the club in a UEFA Champions League group match against FK Partizan, which resulted in a 1–1 draw and a place in the UEFA Cup. He also appeared in the 2004 UEFA Cup Final against Valencia as a substitute, after Barthez was sent off. He made only ten league appearances in two years, however, and with the signing of Fabien Barthez, the club decided to loan out Gavanon to Clermont to gain some first-team experience. He made 22 league appearances for Clermont during the 2005–06 season.

Gavanon transferred to Sochaux after the season ended. He was on the bench as Sochaux won the 2007 Coupe de France Final. On 29 May 2009, FC Sochaux released the goalkeeper along with defenders Olivier Thomas and Hakim El Bounadi and Brazilian-born Tunisian international striker Francileudo Santos.

== International career ==
Gavanon was also a regular player for the France U21 national team, and he was a member of the 24-man squad selected for the European Under-21 Football Championship, held in the summer of 2006.

== Career statistics ==
Appearances and goals by club, season and competition
| Club | Season | League | | | National cup | | League cup | | Europe | | Other | | Total | |
| Club | Season | Division | Apps | Goals | Apps | Goals | Apps | Goals | Apps | Goals | Apps | Goals | Apps | Goals |
|---|---|---|---|---|---|---|---|---|---|---|---|---|---|---|
| Marseille | 2002–03 | Ligue 1 | 0 | 0 | 0 | 0 | 0 | 0 | — | | — | | 0 | 0 |
| Marseille | 2003–04 | Ligue 1 | 2 | 0 | 0 | 0 | 1 | 0 | 2 | 0 | — | | 5 | 0 |
| Marseille | 2004–05 | Ligue 1 | 8 | 0 | 0 | 0 | 0 | 0 | — | | — | | 8 | 0 |
| Marseille | Total | | 10 | 0 | 0 | 0 | 1 | 0 | 2 | 0 | — | | 13 | 0 |
| Clermont (loan) | 2005–06 | Ligue 2 | 22 | 0 | 1 | 0 | 0 | 0 | 0 | 0 | — | | 23 | 0 |
| Sochaux | 2006–07 | Ligue 1 | 1 | 0 | 0 | 0 | 0 | 0 | — | | — | | 47 | 0 |
| Sochaux | 2007–08 | Ligue 1 | 0 | 0 | 0 | 0 | 0 | 0 | 0 | 0 | 0 | 0 | 0 | 0 |
| Sochaux | 2008–09 | Ligue 1 | 5 | 0 | 0 | 0 | 1 | 0 | — | | — | | 35 | 0 |
| Sochaux | Total | | 6 | 0 | 0 | 0 | 1 | 0 | 0 | 0 | 0 | 0 | 7 | 0 |
| Cannes | 2009–10 | Championnat National | 29 | 0 | 1 | 0 | — | | — | | — | | 30 | 0 |
| Cannes | 2010–11 | Championnat National | 36 | 0 | 0 | 0 | — | | — | | — | | 36 | 0 |
| Cannes | 2011–12 | CFA | 25 | 0 | — | | — | | — | | — | | 25 | 0 |
| Cannes | 2012–13 | CFA | 31 | 0 | — | | — | | — | | — | | 31 | 0 |
| Cannes | 2013–14 | CFA | 10 | 0 | 0 | 0 | — | | — | | — | | 10 | 0 |
| Cannes | Total | | 131 | 0 | 1 | 0 | — | | — | | — | | 132 | 0 |
| Career total | | | 169 | 0 | 2 | 0 | 2 | 0 | 2 | 0 | 0 | 0 | 175 | 0 |

== Honours ==
Individual

- Toulon Tournament Best Goalkeeper: 2004
