= Guillaume Loriot =

French footballer (born 1986)

Personal information
- Date of birth: 21 May 1986 (age 40)
- Place of birth: Le Mans, France
- Height: 1.85 m (6 ft 1 in)
- Position: Midfielder

Team information
- Current team: FC Chambly
- Number: 21

Senior career*
| Years | Team | Apps | (Gls) |
| 2005–2010 | Le Mans | 47 | (0) |
| 2008–2009 | → Clermont (loan) | 28 | (1) |
| 2010–2012 | Valenciennes | 8 | (0) |
| 2012–2013 | Boulogne | 41 | (2) |
| 2013–2014 | Fréjus Saint-Raphaël | 17 | (3) |
| 2014–2015 | Orléans | 29 | (2) |
| 2015–2017 | Creteil | 28 | (1) |
| 2017– | FC Chambly | 4 | (0) |
- * Club domestic league appearances and goals as of 8 July 2017 (UTC)

Guillaume Loriot (born 21 May 1986) is a French football midfielder. He currently plays for FC Chambly.
