= 1983 French municipal elections =

Municipal elections were held in France on 6 and 13 March 1983. President François Mitterrand and leader of the Socialist Party held power since May 1981.

The left-wing coalition of the Socialists and Communists, in power for only two years, was defeated in the 1983 local elections by the RPR-UDF right-wing opposition. Voter disillusionment with Pierre Mauroy government's tournant de la rigueur ("austerity turn") played a key role in the defeat. The Communists lost Saint-Étienne and Reims, while the Socialist Party lost Tourcoing, Grenoble, and Roubaix. They narrowly held Marseille (with Gaston Defferre) against Jean-Claude Gaudin (UDF). In Paris, RPR Leader Jacques Chirac was easily re-elected, sweeping all arrondissements.

== Sources ==
- Locals 1983
- E-P Locals
