= 1985 French cantonal elections =

Cantonale elections to renew canton general councillors were held in France on 10 and 17 March 1985. The left, in power since 1981, lost 10 departments. As a result, the right controlled 69 out of 95 departments.

== Electoral system ==
The cantonales elections use the same system as the regional or legislative elections. There is a 10% threshold (10% of registered voters) needed to proceed to the second round.

== National results ==
Runoff results missing

Party/Alliance	% (first round)	Seats
PS	24.90%	413
UDF	18.10%	519
RPR	16.60%	390
Miscellaneous Right	14.40%	399
PCF	12.50%	139
FN	8.90%	2
Miscellaneous Left	1.80%	33
MRG	1.50%	57
Ecologists	0.80%	2
Far-Left	0.60%	0
