= Basketball in France =

- Country: France
- Governing body: French Federation of Basketball
- National team: Men's national team; Women's national team

Club competitions
- Ligue nationale de basket

Basketball is the fifth most popular sport in France and was first played there in 1893. For females, it is the number one team sport.

== History ==
=== 1893-Post World War 2 ===
In December 1893, the first European basketball game was played in Paris. The French youth were influenced by American culture to play basketball. French basketball teams led in the 1930s European Competition and after World War II.

=== 1948 ===
At the 1948 Olympics, the French basketball team won its first medal in their basketball history. They ended up with a silver medal after being defeated by the United States.

=== 1951 & 1953 ===
Under the management of Andre Vacheresse, the team won a bronze medal in Eurobasket.

=== 1960s and 1970s ===
This was a low point in France's basketball history because they were not able to compete in major world competitions. No basketball games were broadcast on TV until the 1970s came. There were many gyms but people did not play in them because they did not have basketballs.

=== 1980s ===
Basketball started to be famous again because the NBA started broadcasting their games on TV. The French basketball team was able to return to the Olympics in 1984. They also competed in the 1986 FIBA World Championship.

=== 2003 ===
France competed in 2003 Eurobasket with talented members such as Tony Parker, Tariq Abdul-Wahad, Jerome Moiso, Boris Diaw, Laurent Foirest, Florent Pietrus, and Cyril Julian.

=== 2015-2016 ===
About 22 French citizens have played in the NBA and in Canada during the 2015–2016 season. Very high attendance was observed during the FIBA EuroBasket 2015 and with the 2016 FIBA Women's Olympic Qualifying Tournament.

=== 2024 ===
Paris hosted the Olympic Games and Paralympic Games in the summer of 2024. Basketball and 3x3 basketball was played in Paris.

=== 2031 ===
France will host the FIBA Basketball World Cup in 2031. This will mark the first time the country has hosted a major basketball event.

== See also ==
- France men's national basketball team
- France women's national basketball team
- French Federation of Basketball
