= Basile Camerling =

French footballer (born 1987)

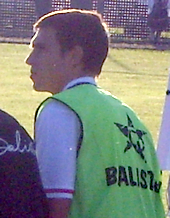

Personal information
- Date of birth: 29 April 1987 (age 39)
- Place of birth: Laxou, France
- Height: 1.84 m (6 ft 1/2 in)
- Position: Striker

Team information
- Current team: UN Käerjéng 97 (on loan from CS Fola Esch)
- Number: 19

Senior career*
Years	Team	Apps	(Gls)
2005–2010	AS Nancy	7	(0)
2009	→ Clermont Foot (loan)	3	(1)
2009–2010	→ SC Amiens (loan)	20	(4)
2010–2012	SR Colmar	13	(4)
2014–2015	Le Mans	18	(5)
2015–	CS Fola Esch	15	(5)
2017–	→ UN Käerjéng 97 (loan)	2	(3)
- * Club domestic league appearances and goals as of 8 September 2017

Basile Camerling (born 29 April 1987) is a French footballer who plays for UN Käerjéng 97 on loan from CS Fola Esch.

== Career ==
On 21 September 2009, AS Nancy loaned the striker to SC Amiens, after he had played the prior half-year on loan for the Clermont Foot.

In October 2013, he went on trial with English championship club Bolton Wanderers, having also spent time on trial with Queens Park Rangers and Charlton Athletic. At the end of the trial, Camerling was not offered a contract; Bolton Manager Dougie Freedman explained the reason he was not offered a contract: "He is a good player but he's probably a couple of months away from fitness and in the end that's exactly why we couldn't sign him".
