= Quentin Garcia =

French ice hockey player

- Born: 26 May 1987 (age 39) Meulun, FRA
- Height: 5 ft 8 in (173 cm)
- Weight: 167 lb (76 kg; 11 st 13 lb)
- Position: attacker
- Catches: Left
- team: Lyon Hockey Club

Quentin Garcia (born 26 May 1987 in Meulun, France) is a professional ice hockey player. He is currently an attacker for the Lyon Hockey Club.

== Career ==
Garcia spent two years playing in the Espoirs team of Grenoble before being promoted to Grenoble's Ligue Magnus team for season 2006. He moved to the Lyon Hockey Club in 2007 and remains with the club in season 2008.

Garcia was part of the 2006 Ligue Magnus championship team and the 2007 FFHG Division 2 Vice-Champion squad from Lyon.
