= Nicolas Saint Grégoire =

French artist and designer (born 1983)

Nicolas Saint Grégoire is a French artist and designer born in 1983. Dividing his time between Paris and New York, he is represented by Galerie Marcel Strouk Rive Gauche (Paris), Cynthia Corbett Gallery (London) and Life As a Work of Art (New York).

Nicolas Saint Gregoire is working mainly with Plexiglas and neon. Seeking to break the boundaries between Fine Arts and other artistic practices such as design or fashion, the work of Nicolas Saint Gregoire raises the question of the nature of a piece of art.

He takes over from traditional forms of furniture (tables, chairs, lighting...) and frees them from all functional, economics or social role. Through his work, those utilitarian objects become objects of art.

Starting 2009, he started drawing the repertoire of forms and motifs created by fashion designer Yves Saint Laurent to create light sculptures that interrogates the status of fashion as art.

== Exhibitions ==
- 2013: Frimousses de Createurs - UNICEF - Petit Palais - Paris
- 2013: Art Southampton - Curator special project - USA
- 2013: Diva special project - Monaco
- 2012: Frimousses de Createurs - UNICEF - Petit Palais - Paris
- 2012: Saint Gregoire Rive Gauche, Stéphane Olivier Gallery, Paris
- 2011: ArtCouture. Solo Show. Gallery 27, London
- 2011: Nicolas Saint Gregoire, Stéphane Olivier Gallery, Paris
- 2011: Volta Basel, Basel
- 2011: Art San Francisco
- 2010: ArtDesign. Solo Show, Stranos, Saint-Tropez
- 2010: London Art Fair
- 2010: Art Miami
- 2009: Art Miami (selected to represent contemporary sculpture)
- 2009: Art on the Top. Solo Show. Empire State Building, New York
