= Cédric Bockhorni =

French footballer (born 1983)

Personal information
- Date of birth: 5 September 1983 (age 43)
- Place of birth: Nancy, France
- Height: 1.82 m (6 ft 0 in)
- Position: Defender

Youth career
- 1993–1995: COS Villers-les-Nancy
- 1995–2000: Nancy

Senior career*
Years	Team	Apps	(Gls)
2000–2003	Nancy	35	(1)
2004–2006	R.E. Virton	54	(7)
2006–2016	Clermont	199	(4)
Total		288	(12)

International career
2002–2004	France U21	2	(0)
- * Club domestic league appearances and goals

Cédric Bockhorni (born 5 September 1983) is a French former professional footballer who played as a defender. He played for Clermont Foot, R.E. Virton, and AS Nancy.

== Career ==
Bockhorni left Clermont at the end of the 2015–16 season with his contract running out, putting an end to a ten-year spell at the club.
