= Marcel Légaut =

French mathematician and philosopher (1900–1990)

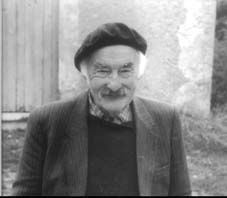

Marcel Légaut (27 April 1900 – 6 November 1990) was a French Christian philosopher and mathematician.

== Biography ==
Marcel Légaut was born in Paris, where he received his Ph.D. in Mathematics from the École Normale Supérieure in 1925. He taught in various faculties (among them Rennes and Lyon) until 1943. Under the impact of the Second World War and the rapid French defeat in 1940, Légaut acknowledged the lack of certain fundamental aspects in his life as well as in the lives of other university professors and civil servants. That is why he tried to alternate teaching with farm work. After three years his project was no longer accepted and he left the University to live as a shepherd in the Pré-Alpes (Haut-Diois). Légaut had married in 1940, and between 1945 and 1953 he became the father of six children.

Twenty years after this renunciation of his social status (and the consequent rooting in common life), Légaut, almost sixty years old, started a deep and personal reflection around man's condition and existence, which was captured in the two volumes of his main work: Human Accomplishment.

Monsieur Portal, his mentor during his youth, had helped him discover that honesty and intellectual independence are essential to a vigorous, spiritual life. This was not usual in the Catholic education of the time, where obedience and adherence to the prevailing doctrine took priority. M. Portal had learned something from the modernist crisis period.

Encouraged in this secular direction by M. Portal, Légaut ruled out the usual lifestyle in the Catholic system of the time (priesthood and religious life), and instead thoroughly followed the scientific path. As a result of these youthful decisions, but also by the way he lived the full engagement, Légaut became a leader of the Catholic students in the Normale Écoles during the interwar period up to the French defeat. He overcame the temptation of absolutizing his function as celibate leader in the group, and therefore Légaut didn't consider himself as a philosopher, or a theologian of formation or occupation. His only degree was his tenacity and freedom of thought (other names for his responsibility). Writing as an older man, Légaut recovered his dream as a youth: to express spiritual life just as it is, in a sincere and honest way, avoiding utopian speculation.

Légaut died in Avignon.

== Publications ==
Marcel Légaut is the author of twenty books, sixteen of which have been published from 1970.

His main work, published in two volumes in 1970 and 1971, is L’accomplissement humain (Human Accomplishment). (Vol. 1: L’homme à la recherche de son humanité; Vol.2: Introduction à l'intelligence du passé et de l'avenir du christianisme. Prior to these, there is a small book called: Travail de la foi (1962). L’homme à la recherche de son humanité was published in English under the title "True humanity" (1982).

After 1971: Mutation de l’Église et conversion personnelle (1975), Priéres d’homme (1974, 1978, 1984), Débat sur la foi I y II (1972, 1977), Devenir soi (1981), Un homme de foi et son Église (1988) and Vie spirituelle et modernite (1992).

Légaut offers, in his books, his meditation, his testimony and his prayer, resulting from the intimate conversation he holds with himself, with his friends and with God. Meditation, testimony and prayer are, in every human being, the three categories corresponding to the different destinataries of intimate "conversation", which is, in short, the sort of communication that every spiritual life aims to achieve according to its deep instinct.

Légaut's books are written with an authority or value that doesn't come from an institutional command nor from a social reliability (command or reliability that would justify its separation from the rest and its leaning on a platform, either academic or other). Its truth comes from the full engagement of living and thinking deeply and freely, without calculation nor self-defence, immersed in "the very living waters of life" (Antonio Machado loved this expression by Teresa de Ávila).

In L’accomplissement humain, Légaut reconsiders his itinerary, and that of his companions, during a century full of great upheavals and mutations, without forgetting to examine the failure of the churches, their current crisis, and thinking how they could truly come out of this decline. His response suggests «taking everything up again from the basis» through a conversion with the essential teachings of Jesus, and facing up without fear, that is to say, with faith, to mutation. In order to take everything up from its origin, his thoughts were centered, in Vol I, around subjects as faith in oneself, married and paternal faith, and faith in the other and in front of reality, including one's death and that of people who are close. An itinerary on self-knowledge, in line with "christian socratism" or "socratic christianism". A path leading to discover, by non ideological means, the faith in God, the following of Jesus and a spiritual style of how to act in the World, in the way of ferment, that includes an adult way of being in Christianity.
