= Loïc Lumbilla =

French footballer (born 1987)

Personal information
- Full name: Loïc Lumbilla-Kandja
- Date of birth: 12 May 1987 (age 39)
- Place of birth: Saint-Denis, France
- Height: 1.83 m (6 ft 0 in)
- Position: Forward

Youth career
- Paris FC
- 2004–2006: Inter Milan

Senior career*
Years	Team	Apps	(Gls)
2006–2008	Inter Milan	0	(0)
2006–2007	→ Legnano (loan)	7	(0)
2007–2008	→ Locarno (loan)	10	(1)
2008–2009	Écija Balompié	2	(0)
2009–2010	VfL Wolfsburg II	4	(1)
2010–2011	Al Quwat		
2011–2012	Al-Shaab		
2013	Hamrun Spartans	9	(3)
2013–2016	Al-Najma SC (Bahrain)		
- * Club domestic league appearances and goals

Loïc Lumbilla-Kandja (born 12 May 1987) is a French former professional footballer who played as a forward.

== Career ==
Lumbilla started his career at Paris FC. In July 2004, along with Tijani Belaid, he signed for the Inter Milan Youth Sector.

In the next season he played for Inter's under-20 team in Campionato Nazionale Primavera. He also played numbers of friendlies for the first team.

In the 2006–07 season, he left on loan to Legnano of Serie C2, where he won the championship.

He then left for FC Locarno of Swiss Challenge League, where he played nine matches.

In January 2009, he signed a contract with Écija Balompié of Spanish Segunda División B.

In August 2009, he signed a two-year contract with VfL Wolfsburg, rejoining former teammate Obafemi Martins.

After a few years playing outside Europe, Lumbilla returned to Europe for Maltese club Hamrun Spartans in January 2013.

== Personal life ==
Born in France in 1987, Lumbilla has Congolese origins.

== Honours ==
- Coppa Italia Primavera: 2006
- Serie C2: 2007
