= Julien N'Da =

Ivorian-French footballer (born 1985)

Personal information
- Full name: Julien N'Da
- Date of birth: 15 August 1985 (age 41)
- Place of birth: Niort, France
- Height: 1.79 m (5 ft 10 1/2 in)
- Position: Defender

Senior career*
Years	Team	Apps	(Gls)
2003–2005	Chamois Niortais	18	(0)
2005–2006	Rouen	13	(0)
2006	Accrington Stanley	3	(0)
2008–2010	Gueugnon	66	(1)
2010–2011	Moulins	11	(0)
2011–2012	Besançon	19	(2)
2013–2014	Chauray	6	(0)
- * Club domestic league appearances and goals as of 18:39, 13 December 2015 (UTC)

Julien N'Da (born 15 August 1985) is an Ivorian-French footballer. He has represented the Ivory Coast national football team at Under-21 level on several occasions.

He started his career at French Ligue 2 outfit Chamois Niortais, (Note: Julien N'Da – French league stats at LFP – also available in French (archived)) where he joined the youth set-up at just 6 years old. He later moved to French Championnat de France amateur team FC Rouen where after a series of impressive performances he was recommended to Accrington Stanley boss John Coleman who signed him on 31 May 2006. He was expected to play a crucial part in Stanley's first season back in the Football League, but suffered medial ligament damage after making only 3 substitute league appearances (5 in all competitions). One of these appearances was as a late substitute in a memorable League Cup win over Nottingham Forest. His contract was terminated by mutual consent in November 2006.
