= Andrée Boisson =

French fencer (1900–1973)

Personal information
- Born: 21 October 1900
- Died: 18 July 1973 (aged 72)

Sport
- Sport: Fencing

Andrée Boisson (21 October 1900 – 18 July 1973) was a French fencer. She competed in the women's individual foil event at the 1936 Summer Olympics.
