= Jérémie Roumegous =

French footballer (born 1985)

Personal information
- Full name: Jérémie Roumegous Geremia
- Date of birth: 9 May 1985 (age 41)
- Place of birth: Villefranche-de-Rouergue, France
- Height: 1.81 m (5 ft 11 1/2 in)
- Position: Defender

Youth career
- 1990–1999: J.S.P. Montbazens
- 1999–2000: Rodez AF
- 2000–2004: AJ Auxerre

Senior career*
| Years | Team | Apps | (Gls) |
| 2004–2006 | Rodez AF | 62 | (2) |
| 2006–2009 | Nîmes Olympique | 84 | (0) |
| 2009–2011 | LB Châteauroux | 20 | (0) |
| 2011–2016 | Rodez AF | | |
- * Club domestic league appearances and goals as of 27 September 2016

Jérémie Roumegous Geremia (born 9 May 1985 in Villefranche-de-Rouergue) is a French football defender who last played for French club Rodez AF.

== Career ==
On 15 June 2009 LB Châteauroux signed the defender from Championnat National side Nîmes Olympique. His previous clubs include AJ Auxerre, Rodez AF and J.S.P. Montbazens.
