= Arnaud Brocard =

French goalkeeper (born 1986)

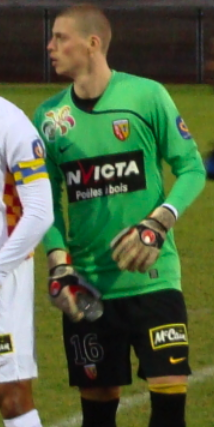

Personal information
- Date of birth: August 19, 1986 (age 40)
- Place of birth: Dijon, France
- Height: 1.86 m (6 ft 1 in)
- Position: Goalkeeper

Youth career
- 2004–2007: Lens

Senior career*
Years	Team	Apps	(Gls)
2007–2009	Lens	8	(0)
2009–2010	Paris FC	13	(0)
2010–2011	Troyes	3	(0)
2011	Gap	2	(0)
2011–2012	Valenciennes	0	(0)
- * Club domestic league appearances and goals as of 14:38, 18 June 2012 (UTC)

Arnaud Brocard (born 19 August 1986 in Dijon) is a French goalkeeper. He previously played in Ligue 2 with RC Lens and Troyes AC in the Championnat National. He made the jump into professional football from the RC Lens youth academy in 2007. Brocard also previously played for Paris FC and Gap.

In August 2011, Brocard joined Ligue 1 side Valenciennes FC as a reserve goalkeeper but could not get chance to play any match.
