= Montenach =

- Commune
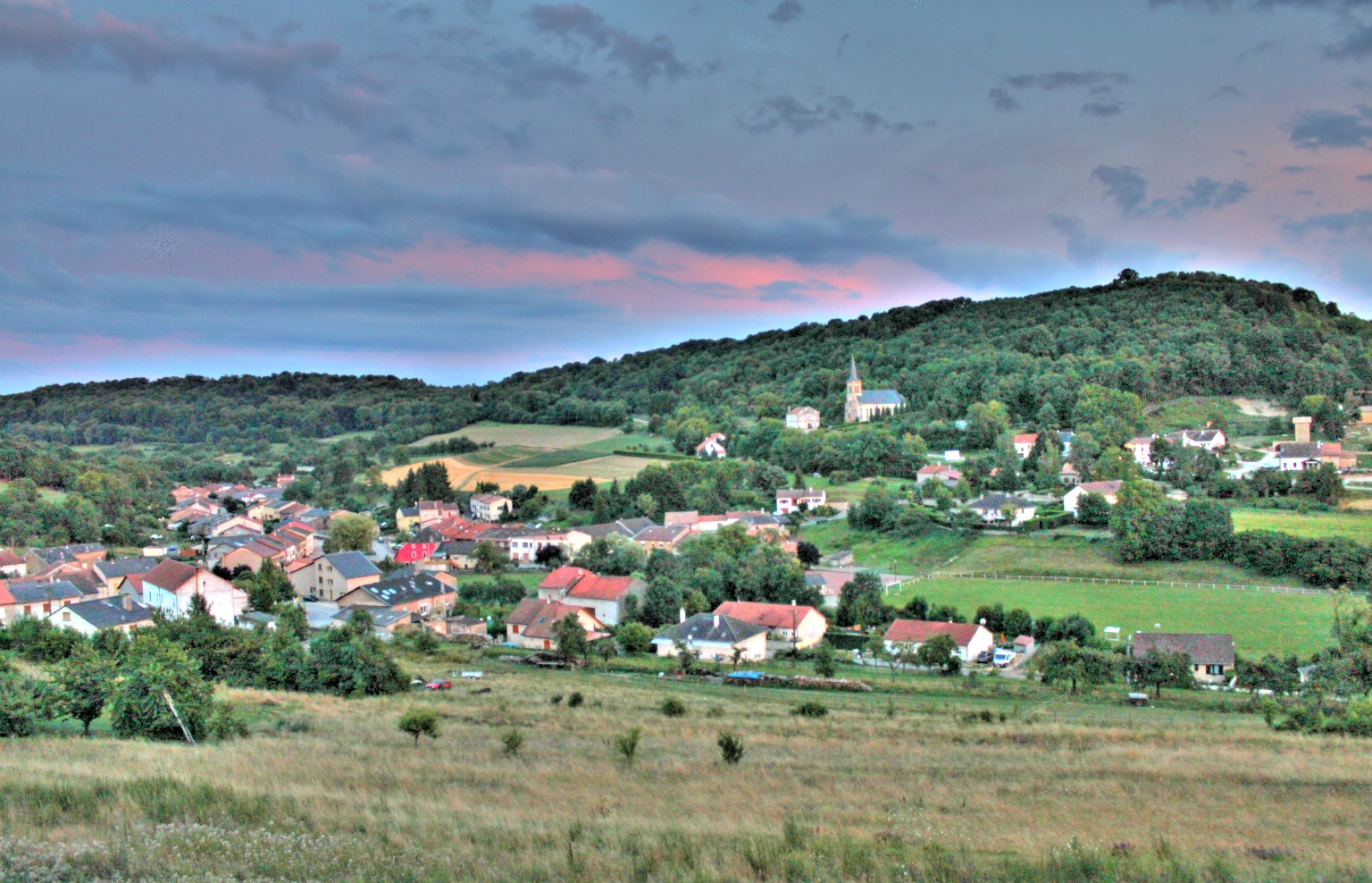
- A general view of Montenach

- Coat of arms
- Location of Montenach
- Location within France Location within Grand Est
- Coordinates: 49°25′13″N 6°22′53″E
- Country: France
- Region: Grand Est
- Department: Moselle
- Arrondissement: Thionville
- Canton: Bouzonville
- Intercommunality: Bouzonvillois-Trois Frontières

Government
  - Mayor (2020–2026): Jean-Paul Tinnes
- Area^{1}: 9.19 km^{2} (3.55 sq mi)
- Elevation: 200 m (660 ft)
- Highest elevation: 340 m (1,120 ft)
- Lowest elevation: 175 m (574 ft)
- Population (2023): 495
  - Density: 53.9/km^{2} (140/sq mi)
- Time zone: UTC+01:00 (CET)
  - Summer (DST): UTC+02:00 (CEST)
- INSEE/Postal code: 57479 /57480
- ^{1} French Land Register data, which excludes lakes, ponds, glaciers > 1 km^{2} (0.386 sq mi or 247 acres) and river estuaries.

Montenach (French pronunciation: [mɔ̃tnak]) is a commune in the Moselle department in Grand Est in north-eastern France.

== See also ==
- Communes of the Moselle department
