= Henriette Alimen =

French archaeologist and prehistorian

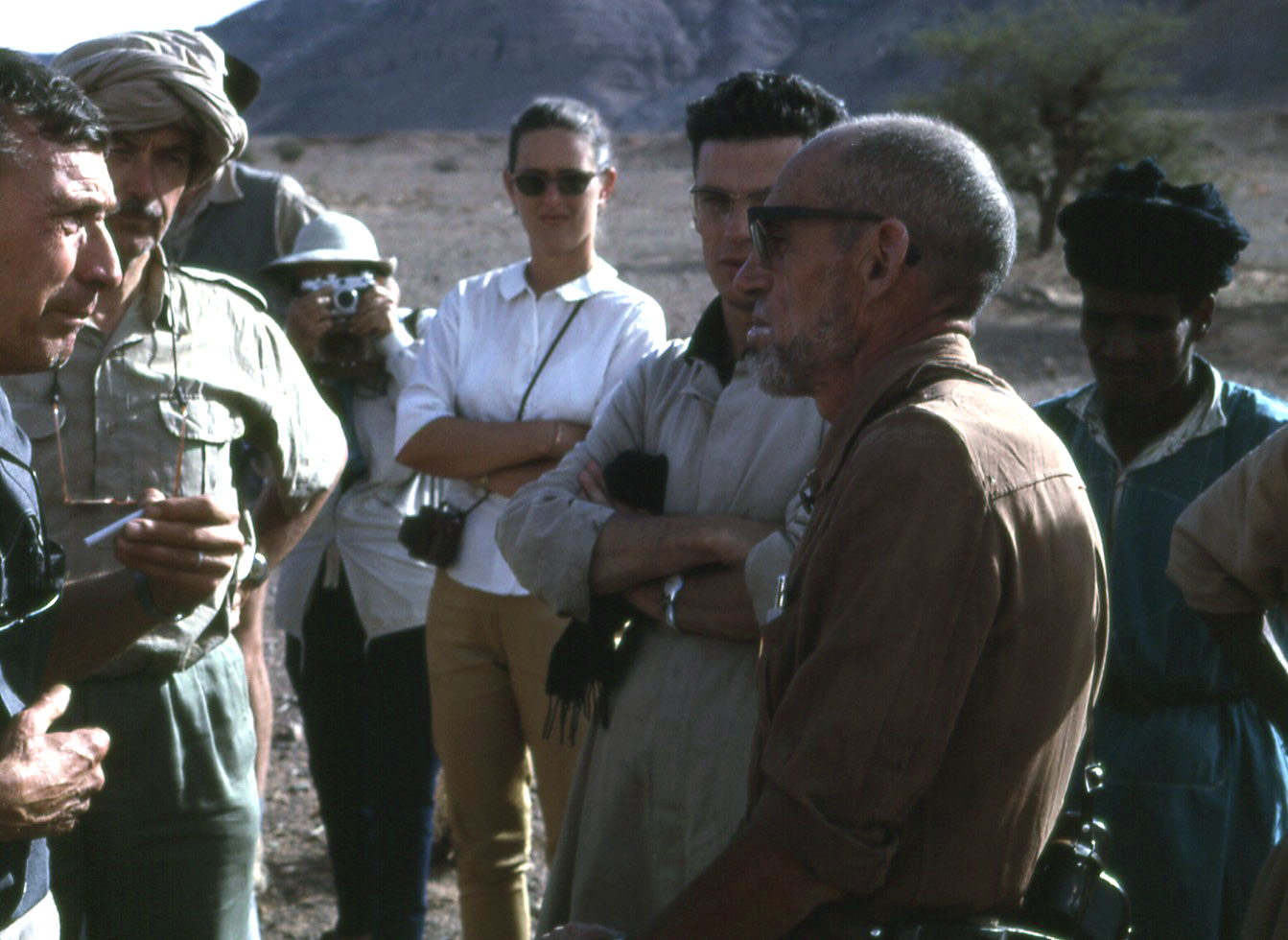
Alimen (obscured by a camera) on an expedition in Mauritania.

Marie-Henriette Alimen (22 June 1900 – 13 March 1996) was a French paleontologist and geologist. Alimen studied at École Normale Supérieure, later going on to teach at Musée de l'Homme, and serve as president of Société géologique de France. Alimen's career was mainly focused on Quaternary geology in France and Africa while working for Centre national de la recherche scientifique (French National Centre for Scientific Research, or CNRS). She later became a Knight of both the Legion of Honour and the Ordre des Palmes Académiques.

== Education ==
Alimen studied at Ecole Normale Supérieure, earning a degree in Natural Sciences, and earned her doctorate in 1936. (one of the first women to submit a submit a thesis for a PhD in the field of prehistory), her thesis was titled Étude sur le Stampien du Bassin de Paris (A Study of Stampien from the Paris Basin). Her thesis wone the 1940 Prix Auguste Viquesnel from the Société géologique de France (Geological Society of France).

== Career ==
Alimen later went on to teach Quaternary Geology at the Musée de l'Homme in Paris from 1946 to 1956. In 1948 Alimen went to work for Centre national de la recherche scientifique, studying the Quaternary geology of the Pyrenees and the Sahara. She later managed the Laboritoire du Géologie Quaterniare for CNRS in Paris, which continued to study Quaternary geology in the two regions. Following her retirement from Centre national de la recherche scientifique, Alimen became President of the Société Géologique de France. Alimen also served as President of the Société Préhistorique Française (Prehistorical Society of France) in 1946 and again in 1960. Alimen published two books through the publisher Boubée, including Atlas de Préhistoire (1950), and La Préhistoire de l'Afrique (1955).

For her contributions she was named a Knight of the Legion of Honour and named a Knight of the Ordre des Palmes Académiques.
