= Jérémy Acédo =

French footballer (born 1987)

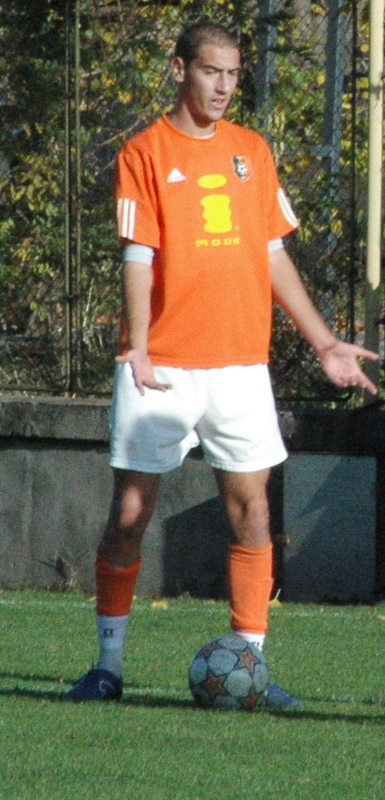

Personal information
- Date of birth: 2 September 1987 (age 39)
- Place of birth: Paray-le-Monial, France
- Height: 1.85 m (6 ft 1 in)
- Position: Midfielder

Senior career*
Years	Team	Apps	(Gls)
2005–2008	Gueugnon	23	(0)
2008	→ Martigues (loan)	11	(0)
2008	Litex Lovech	6	(0)
2009	Créteil	10	(0)
2009–2010	Martigues	13	(0)
2010–2012	Moulins	50	(7)
2012–2017	Stade Montois	99	(6)
2017–2018	Genêts Anglet	7	(0)
Total		219	(13)
- * Club domestic league appearances and goals

Jérémy Acédo (born 2 September 1987) is a French former professional footballer who played as a midfielder.

== Career ==
The son of professional footballer Jean Acédo, who spent his entire career with FC Gueugnon, Acédo began his own career in 2006 at the same club, where his father was working as an assistant coach.
