= Ribar Baikoua =

French basketball player (born 1991)

Ribar Baikoua (born 6 May 1991 in Poitiers) is a French basketball player who plays for French Pro A league club Poitiers. He primarily plays as a swingman. Baikoua recently played at the Amicale Sportive Niortaise in French Regional League.
