= 1997 in France =

- Decades: 1970s; 1980s; 1990s; 2000s; 2010s
- See also: History of France; Timeline of French history; List of years in France

Events from the year 1997 in France.

== Incumbents ==
- President: Jacques Chirac
- Prime Minister: Alain Juppé (until 3 June), Lionel Jospin (starting 3 June)

== Events ==
- 27 January – It is revealed that French museums had nearly 2,000 pieces of art that had been stolen by Nazis.
- 30 March - Euronat, a nationalist European political alliance is founded. It was led by the French National Front (FN). It will be dissolved by 2009.
- 25 May – Legislative Election held.
- 1 June – Legislative Election held.
- 31 August – Diana, Princess of Wales is killed in a car crash in Paris.
- 3 November – In France, striking truck drivers blockade ports during a pay dispute.

== Arts and literature ==
- 6 September – A Jean Michel Jarre Oxygene in Moscow concert, celebrating the city's 850th anniversary, draws 3.5 million people.

== Sport ==
- 17 April – Paris–Roubaix cycling race won by Frédéric Guesdon.
- 29 June – French Grand Prix is won by Michael Schumacher of Germany.
- 5 July – Tour de France begins.
- 27 July – Tour de France ends, won by Jan Ullrich of Germany.

== Births ==
- 3 January – Jérémie Boga, footballer
- 9 January – Issa Diop, footballer
- 12 March – Marie Hoyau, ski jumper
- 26 August – Lisa Gautier, actress, dancer and singer
- 11 September – Garance Le Guillermic actress
- 17 September – Ornella Bankole, basketball player
- 6 October – Théo Hernandez, footballer
- 14 November – Christopher Nkunku, footballer
- 1 December – Michelito Lagravere, Mexican-born bullfighter

=== Full date unknown ===
- Carla Ferrari, chef and TV presenter

== Deaths ==
=== January to June ===
- 12 January – Jean-Edern Hallier, author (b. 1936).
- 8 March – Gershon Liebman, Russian-born French rabbi (b. 1905)
- 16 March – Jean-Dominique Bauby, journalist, author and editor (b. 1952).
- 19 March – Jacques Foccart, politician (b. 1913).
- 19 March – Eugène Guillevic, poet (b. 1907).
- 6 April – Pierre-Henri Teitgen, lawyer, professor and politician (b. 1908).
- 16 April – Roland Topor, illustrator, painter, writer and filmmaker (b. 1938).
- 20 April – Jean Louis, costume designer (b. 1907).
- 3 May – Sébastien Enjolras, motor racing driver (b. 1976).
- 25 June – Jacques-Yves Cousteau, naval officer, explorer, ecologist, filmmaker, scientist, photographer and researcher (b. 1910).

=== July to September ===
- 12 July – François Furet, historian (b. 1927).
- 4 August – Jeanne Calment, supercentenarian and the oldest living person ever documented in history (b. 1875).
- 16 August – Jacques Pollet, motor racing driver (b. 1922).
- 25 September – Jean Françaix, composer, pianist, and orchestrator (b. 1912).

=== October to December ===
- 1 November – Roger Marche, footballer (b. 1924).
- 13 November – James Couttet, alpine skier (b. 1921).
- 16 November – Georges Marchais, head of the French Communist Party (b. 1920).
- 25 November – Monique Serf, singer (b. 1930).
- 28 November – Georges Marchal, actor (b. 1920).
- 30 November – Françoise Prévost, actress (b. 1930).
- 1 December – Stéphane Grappelli, jazz violinist (b. 1908).
- 7 December – Fernand Cornez, cyclist (b. 1907).
- 13 December
  - Georges Rose, footballer (b. 1910).
  - David Rousset, writer and political activist (b. 1912).
- 18 December – Michel Quoist, priest and writer (b. 1921).
- 25 December – Anita Conti, explorer, photographer and first French female oceanographer (b. 1899).

=== Full date unknown ===
- Jean Pierre Capron, painter (b. 1921).
- Jean-Marie Domenach, writer and intellectual (b. 1922).
- Jacques Leguerney, composer (b. 1906).
- Fernand Oury, teacher and creator of modern French schooling (b. 1920).
- Jean-Pierre Sudre, photographer (b. 1921).
- Claude Tresmontant, philosopher, hellenist and theologian (b. 1925).

== See also ==
- List of French films of 1997
