= 1995 in France =

- Decades: 1970s; 1980s; 1990s; 2000s; 2010s
- See also: History of France; Timeline of French history; List of years in France

Events from the year 1995 in France.

== Incumbents ==
- President: François Mitterrand (until 17 May), Jacques Chirac (starting 17 May)
- Prime Minister: Édouard Balladur (until 18 May), Alain Juppé (starting 18 May)

== Events ==
- January – SIVU des Inforoutes de l'Ardèche is founded.
- 21 February – Ibrahim Ali, a 17-year-old Comorian living in France, is murdered by 3 far right National Front activists.
- 13 April – Presidential Election held.
- 7 May – Presidential Election held with Jacques Chirac elected as fifth president of the Fifth Republic.
- 11 June – Municipal Elections held.
- 13 June – President Jacques Chirac announces the resumption of nuclear tests in French Polynesia.
- 18 June – Municipal Elections held.
- 25 July – a gas bottle explodes in the Saint-Michel – Notre-Dame station, killing 8 and wounding 80 people. (see: 1995 Paris Metro bombing)
- 17 August – a bomb at the Arc de Triomphe wounds 17 people.
- 26 August – a huge bomb is found on the railroad tracks of a high-speed rail line near Lyon.
- 3 September – a bomb malfunctions in a square in Paris, wounding 4.
- 7 September – a car bomb at a Jewish school in Lyon wounds 14.
- 18 September – Renault launches the Renault Mégane, a range of hatchbacks, saloons, estates, coupes and cabriolets to replace the R19.
- 24 September – Student, Eric Borel, killed 14 people (including his parents) and injured five others, in a rampage in Toulon, before committing suicide.
- 27 – 28 September – Bob Denard's mercenaries capture President Said Mohammed Djohor of the Comoros; the local army does not resist.
- 29 September – Khaled Kelkal, a leader of the Armed Group (GIA) which carried out the attacks, is killed by EPIGN gendarmerie members resisting arrest.
- October – Peugeot launches the 406 range of saloons, estates and coupés that replaces the 405. It also enters the people carrier market with the 806, which will also be sold as the Citroen Synergie, Fiat Ulysse and Lancia Z as part of a venture between PSA Peugeot Citroen and Fiat.
- 4 October – France launches a counter-coup in the Comoros with 600 soldiers. They arrest Bob Denard and his mercenaries and take Denard to France; Caabi el-Yachroutu becomes the interim president.
- 6 October – a gas bottle explodes in station Maison Blanche of the Paris Métro, wounding 13.
- 17 October – a gas bottle explodes between the Musée d'Orsay and Saint-Michel – Notre-Dame stations, wounding 29.
- 17 October- French-woman Jeanne Calment reaches the confirmed age of 120 years and 238 days making her the oldest person ever recorded.
- 15–16 December – 16 members of the Order of the Solar Temple die in a mass murder-suicide in the Vercors Massif. These bodies are discovered on 23 December, the day after the first publication of the report of the Parliamentary Commission on Cults in France.

== Arts and literature ==
La Haine is released.

== Sport ==
- 9 April – Paris–Roubaix cycle race won by Franco Ballerini of Italy.
- 1 July – Tour de France begins.
- 2 July – French Grand Prix won by Michael Schumacher of Germany.
- 23 July – Tour de France ends, won by Miguel Indurain of Spain.

== Births ==
=== January to March ===
- 13 January – Léna Marrocco, figure skater
- 28 January
  - Wylan Cyprien, footballer
  - Anne-Gaëlle Servel alias AG la jument de Michao, chanteuse folklorique bretonne
  - Calvin Hemery, tennis player
- 5 February – Rouguy Diallo, triple jumper
- 6 February – Enzo Crivelli, footballer
- 9 February – Yann Bodiger, footballer
- 13 February – Georges-Kévin Nkoudou, footballer
- 16 February – Nicolas Gavory, footballer
- 17 February – Stéphane Sparagna, footballer
- 27 February – Charlotte Bonnet, swimmer
- 2 March – Ange-Freddy Plumain, footballer
- 9 March – Baptiste Santamaria, footballer
- 15 March – Morgan Demiro-O-Domiro, trampoline gymnast
- 24 March – Enzo Fernández, footballer

=== April to October ===
- 1 April – Maxence Perrin, actor
- 8 April – Farès Bahlouli, footballer
- 23 April – Lénaëlle Gilleron-Gorry, figure skater
- 24 April – Axel Chapelle, pole vaulter
- 10 May – Gabriella Papadakis, ice dancer
- 23 May – Younès Kaabouni, footballer
- 31 May – Romain Le Gac, ice dancer
- 5 June – Ferland Mendy, footballer
- 6 June – Mira Boumejmajen, artistic gymnast
- 17 June – Clément Lenglet, footballer
- 22 June – Wilhem Belocian, sprinter
- 24 June – Hervin Ongenda, footballer
- 25 June – Jean-Philippe Gbamin, footballer
- 3 July – Mike Maignan, footballer
- 15 July – Corentin Jean, footballer
- 26 July – Marco Ilaimaharitra, footballer
- 13 August – Presnel Kimpembe, footballer
- 22 August – Aristote Madiani, footballer
- 27 August – Joelly Belleka, basketball player
- 13 September – Jordan Bardella, politician.

=== November to December ===
- 3 November – Coline Mattel, ski jumper
- 12 November – Thomas Lemar, footballer
- 28 November – Thomas Didillon, footballer
- 1 December – Sophia Serseri, gymnast
- 5 December – Anthony Martial, footballer

== Deaths ==
=== January to March ===
- 4 January – Nina Tikhonova, Russian-born ballet dancer and teacher (b. 1910).
- 21 January – Philippe Casado, cyclist (b. 1964)
- 26 January – Marcel Bidot, cyclist (b. 1902)
- 27 January – Jean Tardieu, artist, musician, poet and author (b. 1903)
- 1 February – François Boutin, Thoroughbred horse trainer (b. 1937)
- 2 February – André Frossard, journalist and essayist (b. 1915)
- 13 March – Odette Sansom, World War II heroine (b. 1912)

=== April to June ===
- 5 April – Christian Pineau, French Resistance leader and politician (b. 1904)
- 18 May – Henri Laborit, physician, writer and philosopher (b. 1914)
- 25 May – Élie Bayol, motor racing driver (b. 1914)
- 2 June – Alexandre de Marenches, military officer (b. 1921)
- 3 June – Jean-Patrick Manchette, novelist (b. 1942)
- 22 June – Yves Congar, priest and theologian (b. 1904)
- 23 June – Henri de Laulanie, Jesuit priest and agriculturalist (b. 1920)
- 27 June – Jacques Berque, Islamic scholar and sociologist (b. 1910)

=== July to September ===
- 8 July – Paul Bonneau, composer (b. 1918)
- 15 July – Robert-Joseph Coffy, Roman Catholic cardinal (b. 1920)
- 19 July – René Privat, cyclist (b. 1930)
- 23 July – Fabien Galateau, cyclist (b. 1913)
- 29 July – Philippe De Lacy, actor (b. 1917)
- 6 August – André Fleury, composer, pianist and organist (b. 1903)
- 11 August – Marcel Moussy, screenwriter and television director (b. 1924)
- 19 August – Pierre Schaeffer, composer, inventor of musique concrète (b. 1910)
- 22 August – Gilles Andruet, chess player (b. 1958)
- 29 August – Pierre Max Dubois, composer (b. 1930)
- September – René Zazzo, psychologist (b. 1910)
- 4 September – Edmond Jouhaud, one of four generals who staged the Algiers putsch of 1961 (b. 1905)
- 24 September – Eric Borel, spree killer (b. 1978)

=== October to December ===
- 1 October – Marcel Noual, swimmer (b. 1912)
- 7 October – Gérard de Vaucouleurs, astronomer (b. 1918)
- 19 October – André Lalande, military officer (b. 1913)
- 29 October – Pierre Hornus, footballer (b. 1908)
- 4 November – Gilles Deleuze, philosopher (b. 1925)
- 23 November – Louis Malle, film director (b. 1932)

=== Full date unknown ===
- Adrien Goybet, Chevalier of the French Legion of Honor (b. 1922)
- Jean-Yves Couliou, painter (b. 1916)
- Gilbert Martineau, author and curator of the French properties on St Helena (b. 1918)

== See also ==
- 1995 in French television
- List of French films of 1995
