= 1992 in France =

- Decades: 1970s; 1980s; 1990s; 2000s; 2010s
- See also: History of France; Timeline of French history; List of years in France

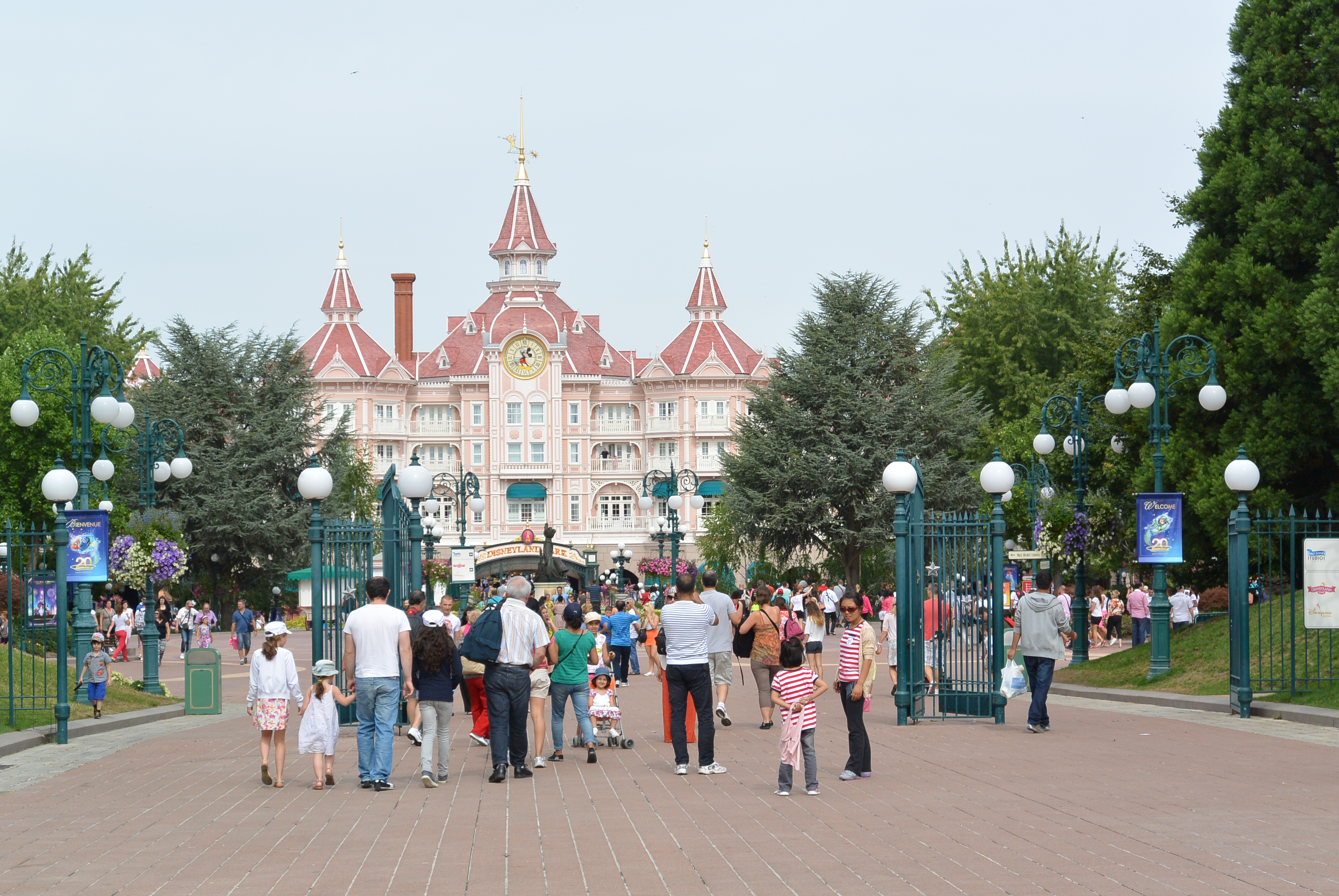
Disneyland Park Paris (opened in 1992)

Events from the year 1992 in France.

== Incumbents ==
- President: François Mitterrand
- Prime Minister: Édith Cresson (until 2 April) Pierre Bérégovoy (starting 2 April)

== Events ==
- 20 January – Air Inter Flight 148 crashes into the Vosges Mountains while on approach to Strasbourg, killing 87 of the 96 people on board.
- 22 March – Regional Elections held.
- 22 March – Cantonales Elections held.
- 29 March – Cantonales Elections held.
- 12 April – Euro Disney resort and theme park opens to the east of Paris.
- 17 June – The France's pursuit of the Euro 92 are ended by a 2–1 defeat to Denmark in the final group game in Sweden.
- 20 September – Maastricht Treaty referendum held, with a small majority in favour of ratification of the Maastricht Treaty.
- 8 October – Launch of the Renault Twingo, an entry-level car which takes on a ground-breaking one-box design and will compete with the likes of the new Fiat Cinquecento.
- 17 November – Start of the "couscous connection" trial in which Habib Ben Ali, the younger brother of the President of Tunisia is accused of laundering drug money.

== Arts and literature ==
- 9 April – Jean-François Deniau, essayist and novelist, elected to the Académie française.
- 12 April – Disneyland Paris officially opens under the name "EuroDisney".
- 20 December – The Folies Bergère music hall in Paris closes.

== Sport ==
- 8 February – The opening ceremony for the 1992 Winter Olympics is held in Albertville.
- 23 February – The closing ceremony of the 1992 Winter Olympics is held.
- 5 May – Armand Césari Stadium disaster in Bastia, Corsica, when one of the terraces collapsed, killing 18 people.
- 4 July – Tour de France begins.
- 5 July – French Grand Prix won by Nigel Mansell of the United Kingdom.
- 26 July – Tour de France ends, won by Miguel Indurain of Spain.

== Births ==
- 17 January
  - Dounia Abdourahim, handball player
  - Laura Augé, swimmer
- 22 January – Benjamin Jeannot, footballer
- 7 February – Jain, singer-songwriter and musician
- 10 February – Pauline Ferrand-Prévot, cyclist
- 15 February – Annaïg Butel, footballer
- 19 February – Marie Annequin, swimmer
- 21 February – Gauthier Mahoto, footballer
- 3 March – Sega Keita, footballer
- 10 March – Neeskens Kebano, footballer
- 28 March – Alexandre Ndoye, basketball player
- 30 March – Abdoulaye Diallo, footballer
- 31 March – William Gros, footballer
- 10 April – Najib Ammari, footballer
- 13 April – Melodie Monrose, model
- 24 April – Sigrid Agren, model
- 29 April – Gaël N'Lundulu, footballer
- 30 April – Mike Cestor, footballer
- 11 May – Pierre-Ambroise Bosse, middle-distance athlete
- 14 May – Anthony Derouard, footballer
- 18 May – Kevin Mendy, basketball player
- 22 May – Camille Lou, singer
- 28 May – Stéphane Bahoken, footballer
- 9 June
  - Yannick Agnel, swimmer
  - Dennis Appiah, footballer
- 16 June – Alexandre Jallier, French basketball player
- 17 June – Hugo Valente, French auto racing driver
- 18 June
  - Rachid Alioui, footballer
  - Adama Soumaoro, footballer
- 22 June – Terence Makengo, footballer
- 29 June – Sabri Lontadila, basketball player
- 6 August – Mehdi Abeid, footballer
- 19 August – Estelle Mossely, Boxer
- 4 September – Layvin Kurzawa, footballer
- 12 September – Gilbert Imbula, footballer
- 15 September – Camélia Jordana, pop singer
- 11 October – Jean-Daniel Akpa Akpro, footballer
- 25 October – Clarisse Agbegnenou, judoka
- 7 November – Agnès Raharolahy, sprinter
- 1 December – Quentin Bigot, hammer thrower
- 2 December – Massadio Haïdara, footballer
- 12 December – Félix Maritaud, actor
- 24 December – Serge Aurier, footballer

== Deaths ==
=== January to June ===
- 21 January – Bernard Cornut-Gentille, administrator and politician (born 1909).
- 1 February – Jean Hamburger, physician, surgeon and essayist (born 1909).
- 20 February – Pierre Dervaux, operatic conductor and composer (born 1917).
- 14 March – Jean Poiret, actor, director and screenwriter (born 1926).
- 16 March – Yves Rocard, physicist (born 1903).
- 20 March – Georges Delerue, film composer (born 1925).
- 30 March – Amédée Fournier, cyclist (born 1912).
- 27 April – Olivier Messiaen, composer, organist and ornithologist (born 1908).
- 5 May – Jean-Claude Pascal, costume designer and singer (born 1927).
- 30 June – André Hébuterne, painter (born 1894).

=== July to December ===
- 24 July – Arletty, singer and actress (born 1898).
- 2 August – Michel Berger, singer and songwriter (born 1947).
- 19 August – Jean-Albert Grégoire, car pioneer (born 1899).
- 29 August – Félix Guattari, militant, institutional psychotherapist and philosopher (born 1930).
- 16 September – Henri Legay, operatic tenor (born 1920).
- 15 October – Paul Paillole, soldier (born 1905).
- 29 November
  - Jean Dieudonné, mathematician (born 1906).
  - Raoul Ploquin, film producer, production manager and screenwriter.
- 10 December – Jacques Perret, writer (born 1901).
- 23 December – Vincent Fourcade, interior designer (born 1934).

=== Full date unknown ===
- Jules Gros, Breton linguist (born 1890).
- Bernard Lefebvre, photographer (born 1906).

== See also ==
- List of French films of 1992
