= 1999 in France =

- Decades: 1970s; 1980s; 1990s; 2000s; 2010s
- See also: History of France; Timeline of French history; List of years in France

Events from the year 1999 in France.

== Incumbents ==
- President: Jacques Chirac
- Prime Minister: Lionel Jospin

== Events ==
- 1 January - the euro currency is introduced for digital transactions in the European Union (EU) Eurozone member countries.
- 3 March – ratification of the Amsterdam Treaty by the French National Assembly.
- 17 March – ratification of the Amsterdam Treaty by the Senate.
- 24 March – Mont Blanc Tunnel fire: A fire in the Mont Blanc Tunnel kills 39 people, closing the tunnel for nearly three years.
- 13 June – European Parliament election in France.
- 11 August – a total solar eclipse occurs in the north of France.
- September – The Peugeot 607 is launched to replace the unsuccessful decade-old 605.
- 13 October – Pacte civil de solidarité (a type of civil union) adopted by French Parliament.
- 12 December – a ship, Erika, breaks up near Penmarc'h spilling 37 000 tons of fuel, causing an oil slick on the Breton, Vendean and Charentaise coasts. Loire-Atlantique is particularly affected.
- 26 and 28 December – Storms Lothar and Martin cause heavy damage with winds reaching 180 km/h. The total damage includes more than 90 dead, 6 billion euros paid by the insurers and 10,000 km^{2} of forest devastated.
- 29 December – English woman Evelyn Wilkinson-Lund is reported missing from her home in Rayssac.
- Full date unknown – Certificat d'aptitude à l'enseignement aéronautique, a national degree for aeronautics and space knowledge, is introduced.

== Arts and literature ==
- 2 September – Publication of Jean-Marie Guéhenno's "L'avenir de la liberté – La démocratie dans la mondialisation", which examines the problems arising from confrontation between the democracy and globalisation

== Sport ==
- 27 June – French Grand Prix won by Heinz-Harald Frentzen of Germany.
- 3 July – Tour de France begins.
- 25 July – Tour de France ends, won by Lance Armstrong of the United States.

== Births ==
- 21 March – Mélusine Mayance, actress
- 26 March - Bleuenn Battistoni, Ballerina
- 14 April – Matteo Guendouzi, soccer player
- 13 July – Julian Chartier, trampoline gymnast
- 25 October – Noémie Brochant, basketball player

== Deaths ==
=== January ===
- 6 January – Michel Petrucciani, Jazz pianist (b. 1962).
- 19 January – Jacques Lecoq, actor, mime and acting instructor (b. 1921).
- 24 January – Roger Rondeaux, cyclo-cross racer (b. 1920).
- 25 January – Henri Rochereau, politician and European Commissioner (b. 1908).
- 26 January – Jeanne-Marie Darré, pianist (b. 1905).

=== February ===
- 3 February – Luc Borrelli, soccer player (b. 1965)
- 4 February – Maurice Najman, journalist (born 1948)
- 12 February – André Devigny, soldier and French Resistance member (b. 1916)
- 18 February – Andreas Feininger, photographer (b. 1906)

=== March ===
- 12 March – André Nocquet, aikido teacher (b. 1914).
- 17 March – Jean Pierre-Bloch, French Resistance member (b. 1905).
- 20 March – Elsa Barraine, composer (b. 1910)
- 21 March – Jean Guitton, Catholic philosopher and theologian (b. 1901).

=== May ===
- 25 May – René Gallice, soccer player (b. 1919).

=== June ===
- 9 June – Maurice Journeau, composer (b. 1898).
- 19 June – Henri, comte de Paris, Orléanist claimant to the French throne (b. 1908).
- 28 June – Louis Ducatel, politician and businessman (b. 1902).
- 30 June – Edouard Boubat, photographer (b. 1923).

=== July to October ===
- 16 July – André Martinet, linguist (b. 1908).
- 30 July – Hermann Panzo, athlete (b. 1958).
- 22 August – Yann Goulet, sculptor, Breton nationalist and war-time Nazi collaborationist (b. 1914).
- 30 August – Raymond Poïvet, cartoonist (b. 1910).
- 14 September – Jehan Buhan, fencer (b. 1912).
- 15 September – Michel Pinseau, architect (b. 1924).
- 4 October – Bernard Buffet, painter (b. 1928).
- 27 October – Charlotte Perriand, architect and designer (b. 1903).

=== November ===
- 3 November – Alan Heusaff, Breton nationalist and linguist (b. 1921).
- 9 November – Claude Ballot-Léna, motor racing driver (b. 1936).
- 11 November – Alphonse Antoine, cyclist (b. 1915).
- 13 November – Germaine Dieterlen, anthropologist (b. 1903).
- 21 November – Serge Lang, journalist, alpine skier, and founder of the alpine skiing World Cup (b. 1920).
- 25 November – Pierre Bézier, engineer (b. 1910).
- 27 November – Alain Peyrefitte, scholar and politician (b. 1925).

=== December ===
- 6 December – Paul Bacon, politician (b. 1907).
- 18 December – Robert Bresson, film director (b. 1901).
- 23 December – Marcel Landowski, composer, biographer and arts administrator (b. 1915).
- 24 December – Maurice Couve de Murville, politician and Prime Minister (b. 1907).
- 28 December – Pierre Clémenti, actor (b. 1942).
- 28 December – Louis Féraud, fashion designer and artist (b. 1921).

=== Full date unknown ===
- René Le Hir, Breton nationalist (b. 1920).
- Laure Leprieur, radio personality (b. 1919).

== See also ==
- List of French films of 1999
