= 1993 in France =

- Decades: 1970s; 1980s; 1990s; 2000s; 2010s
- See also: History of France; Timeline of French history; List of years in France

Events from the year 1993 in France.

== Incumbents ==
- President: François Mitterrand
- Prime Minister: Pierre Bérégovoy (until 29 March), Édouard Balladur (starting 29 March)

== Events ==
=== January to March ===
- 28 January – Philippe Bernard, the French ambassador to Zaire, is killed in an attack on the French Embassy in Kinshasa by soldiers rioting against Zaire's President Mobutu Sese Seko.
- 16 February – A memorial dedicated to French casualties in the First Indochina War is inaugurated by President François Mitterrand in Fréjus.
- 18 February – Peugeot launches the 306 range of hatchbacks, estates, convertibles and saloons, which will mainly be built at Peugeot's factory near Coventry in England, which was formerly owned by the Rootes Group and the now-defunct European division of Chrysler.
- 7 March – Citroën launches the Xantia five-door hatchback, which replaces the 10-year-old BX. An estate model is due next year.
- 20 March - Peugeot launched the 306 hatchback, which replaces the 309 and some versions of the 205.
- 21 and 28 March – 1993 French legislative election: The alliance between Rally for the Republic and Union for French Democracy defeats the Socialist Party in a landslide victory, winning 449 of the 577 seats in the French National Assembly. Pierre Bérégovoy is subsequently replaced as prime minister by Edouard Balladur on 29 March.

=== April to June ===
- April – The closure of four national observatories by the end of the decade is announced in a cost-saving measure to maintain France's funding commitments towards international astronomical facilities.
- 15 May – Teacher Laurence Dreyfus and six children are rescued by police after being held hostage by a gunman in a nursery school in Paris for two days. Dreyfus is later awarded the Légion D'honneur for her bravery.
- 26 May – Olympique de Marseille become the first French club to win the European Cup after defeating Italian side A.C. Milan by a score of 1–0 in the 1993 UEFA Champions League Final in Munich.
- 8 June – René Bousquet, a banker and a former police administrator in Vichy France, is shot dead in his Parisian home. The shooter, Christian Didier, is arrested later that day after confessing in an impromptu press conference held with television media.
- 18 June – Météo-France, the nation's meteorological service, is established.

=== July to December ===
- 13 October – The fifth summit of the Francophonie opens in Mauritius.
- November – A total of 538 people are infected in an outbreak of trichinellosis in Paris, Velizy, La Rochelle, and Coulommiers after consuming horse meat from a single carcass imported from Canada.
- December – The Renault Laguna is launched as a hatchback to replace the Renault 21 hatchback and saloon, although the Savanna estate will continue until 1995 when the Laguna estate is launched.
- 2 December – A planned merger between Renault and Swedish car maker Volvo to create the world's sixth largest automotive manufacturer is cancelled after executives at Volvo force a withdrawal over concerns about the direction of the future merged company.
- 10 December – Air France Flight 2306 between Paris and Nice is hijacked by a knife-wielding man shortly before arriving at Nice. Despite demands to be flown to Tripoli, the aircraft lands as intended at Cote d'Azur airport, where all 123 passengers and six crew members onboard are released unharmed.

== Sport ==
- 16 May – Marseille defeats A.C. Milan in the UEFA Champions League Final, becoming the first French team to win the European Cup.
- 3 July – Tour de France begins.
- 4 July – Alain Prost wins the French Grand Prix, held at the Circuit de Magny-Cours, for the sixth time.
- 25 July – Tour de France ends won by Miguel Indurain of Spain.
- 3 October – Urban Sea, ridden by jockey Eric Saint-Martin, wins the 72nd Prix de l'Arc de Triomphe.
- 17 November – France are eliminated from qualifying for the 1994 FIFA World Cup after a 2–1 defeat to Bulgaria at the Parc des Princes.

== Births ==
- 5 January – Marie-Bernadette Mbuyamba, basketball player.
- 21 January – Clément Mignon, swimmer.
- 15 March – Paul Pogba, footballer
- 25 April – Raphaël Varane, footballer
- 20 July – Lucas Digne, footballer.
- 1 September – Ilona Mitrecey, singer.

== Deaths ==
=== January to March ===
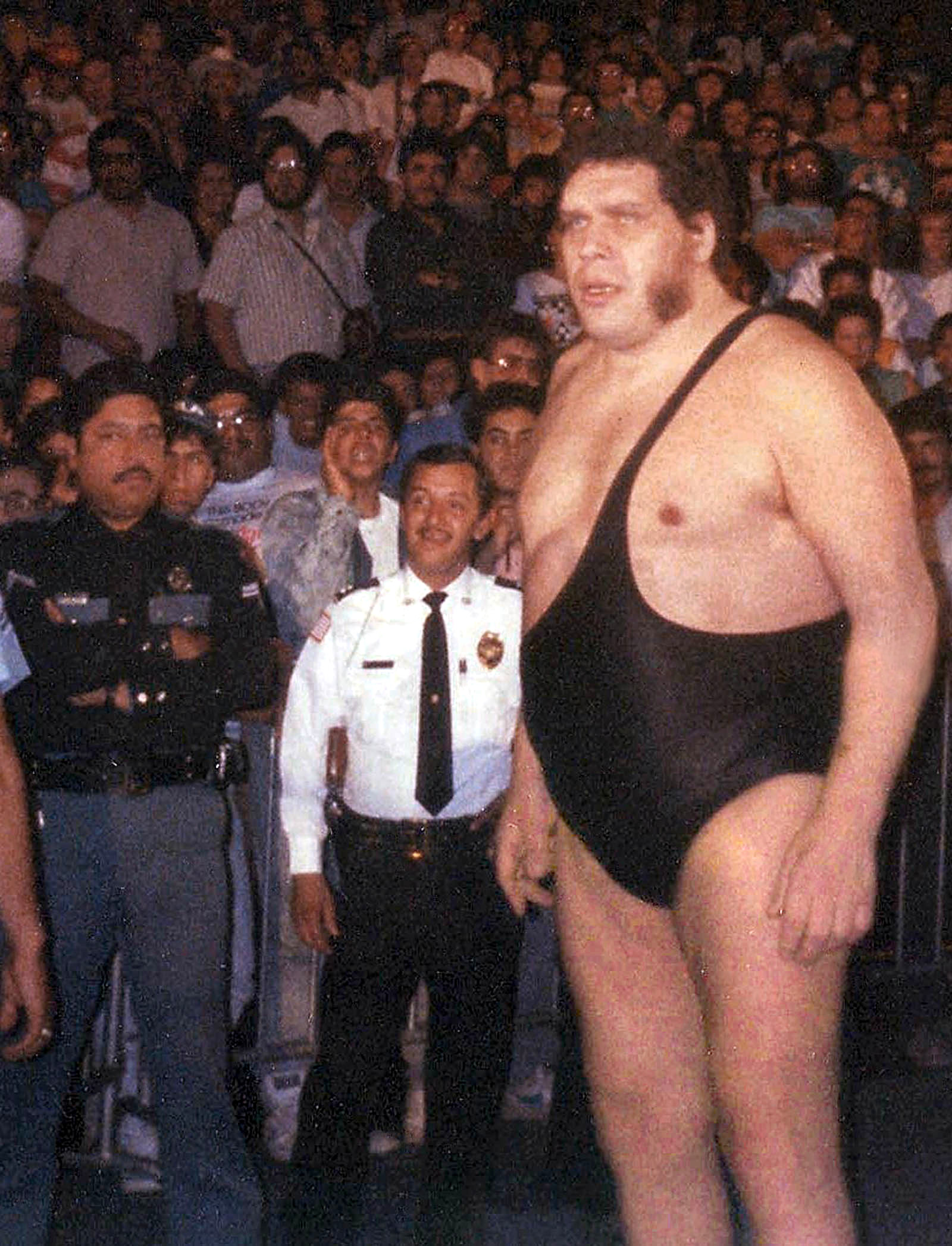
André the Giant c. 1980s

- 13 January
  - René Pleven, French politician, 88th prime minister of France (b. 1901)
  - Charles Tillon, French politician (b. 1897)
- 20 January – Françoise Dior, French supporter of the postwar Nazi cause (b. 1932)
- 27 January – André the Giant, French WWF professional wrestler (b. 1946)
- 31 January – Claude de Cambronne, French aircraft manufacturer \9b. 1905)
- 21 February – Jean Lecanuet, politician (b. 1920)
- 8 February – Roland Mousnier, historian (b. 1907)
- 10 February – Maurice Bourgès-Maunoury, politician and Prime Minister of France (b. 1914)
- 25 February – Eddie Constantine, American-born French actor and singer (b. 1917)
- 19 March – Roger Michelot, boxer (b. 1912)
- 30 March – Andrée Brunet, figure skater (b. 1901)

=== April to June ===
- 1 April – Andrée Brunin, poet (b. 1937)
- 23 April - Séra Martin, middle-distance Olympic runner (b. 1906)
- 1 May – Pierre Bérégovoy, politician and Prime Minister of France (b. 1925)
- 22 May – Alfred Vaucher, theologian, church historian and bibliographer (b. 1887)
- 4 June – André Girard, civil servant and Resistance worker (b. 1909)
- 8 June – René Bousquet, civil servant, secretary general of the Vichy regime police (b. 1909)
- 14 June – Louis Jacquinot, lawyer and politician (b. 1898)
- 18 June – Jean Cau, writer and journalist (b. 1925)
- 19 June – Marcel Béalu, writer (b. 1908)

=== July to September ===
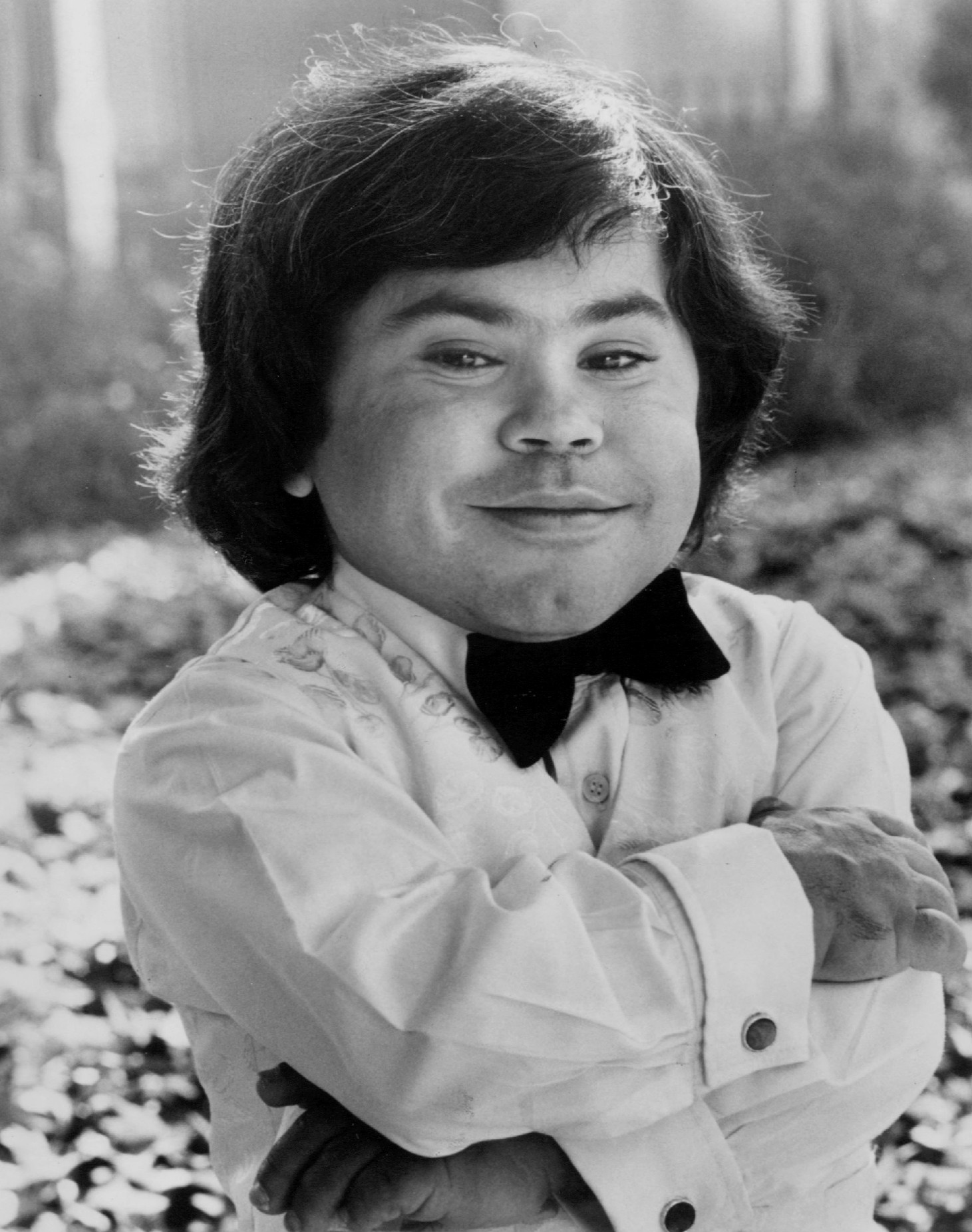
Hervé Villechaize in 1977

- 14 July – Léo Ferré, poet, composer, singer and musician (b. 1916)
- 21 July – René-Jean Jacquet, soccer player (b. 1933)
- 16 August – René Dreyfus, motor racing driver (b. 1905)
- 4 September – Hervé Villechaize, actor (b. 1943)
- 5 September – Claude Renoir, cinematographer (b. 1914)
- 7 September – Christian Metz, film theorist (b. 1931)

=== October to December ===
- 1 November – Clément Dupont, rugby union player (b. 1899)
- 16 November – Achille Zavatta, clown and circus operator (b. 1915)
- 13 December – Vanessa Duriès, novelist (b. 1972)
- 18 December – Georges Bégué, engineer and Special Operations Executive agent (b. 1911)
- 23 December – Sylvia Bataille, actress (b. 1908)
- 25 December – Pierre Victor Auger, physicist (b. 1899)
- 27 December – André Pilette, motor racing driver (b. 1918)

=== Full date unknown ===
- Pierre Naville, writer and sociologist (b. 1903).

== Animal births ==
- Helissio, thoroughbred racehorse, winner of the 1996 Prix de l'Arc de Triomphe (died 2013).

== See also ==
- List of French films of 1993
