= 1994 in France =

- Decades: 1970s; 1980s; 1990s; 2000s; 2010s
- See also: History of France; Timeline of French history; List of years in France

Events from the year 1994 in France.

== Incumbents ==
- President: François Mitterrand
- Prime Minister: Édouard Balladur

== Events ==
- 20 March – Cantonales Elections held.
- 24 March – Cantonales Elections held.
- 20 April – Paul Touvier is found guilty of ordering the execution of seven Jews at Rillieux-la-Pape in June 1944, becoming the first French national to be charged with crimes against humanity committed during the German occupation of France in the Second World War.
- 6 May – The Channel Tunnel is opened by President François Mitterrand and Elizabeth II in two separate ceremonies held in Calais and Folkestone.
- 12 June – European Parliament election held in France.
- 30 June – Airbus A330 test flight crash in Toulouse, killing 3 crew and 4 passengers.
- 4 August – Toubon Law enacted.
- 3 November – A French magazine publishes photo of President François Mitterrand's secret daughter.
- 13 November – The first passengers travel through the Channel Tunnel.
- 7 December – L'étrange Noël de monsieur Jack on French Movie Theater
- 24 December – Air France Flight 8969 is hijacked in Algiers airport.
- 26 December – Raid of Air France Flight 8969: The Hijacked Air France aircraft is flown to Marseille and stormed by the GIGN, 4 hijackers and 3 others were killed.

== Sport ==
- 2 July – Tour de France begins. Two stages take place in England.
- 3 July – Michael Schumacher wins the French Grand Prix held at the Circuit de Nevers Magny-Cours.
- 24 July – Tour de France ends, won by Miguel Indurain of Spain.

== Births ==
- 6 January – Margaux Pinot, judoka
- 19 January – Adrien Hunou, footballer
- 23 January – Wesley Jobello, footballer
- 30 January
  - Tom Hudson, actor
  - Werenoi, rapper (d. 2025)
- 13 February – Axel Reymond, Marathon swimmer
- 3 March – Abdoulaye Touré, footballer
- 27 May – Aymeric Laporte, footballer
- 13 June – Guy-Elphège Anouman, sprinter
- 14 June – Romain Habran, footballer
- 17 July – Benjamin Mendy, footballer
- 3 August – Corentin Tolisso, footballer
- 17 August – Tiémoué Bakayoko, footballer
- 15 September – Raphael Severe, clarinet player
- 27 October – Kurt Zouma, footballer
- 8 November – Damien Dussaut, footballer

== Deaths ==
=== January to March ===
- 2 January – Pierre-Paul Schweitzer, fourth managing director of the International Monetary Fund (born 1912)
- 15 January – Gabriel-Marie Garrone, cardinal (born 1901)
- 22 January – Jean-Louis Barrault, actor, director and mime artist (born 1910)
- 24 January – Yves Navarre, writer (born 1940)
- 27 January – Alain Daniélou, historian, musicologist and Indologist (born 1907)
- 30 January – Pierre Boulle, novelist (born 1912)
- 11 February – Max Leognany, artist (born 1913)
- 16 February – François Marty, Roman Catholic crdinal (born 1904)
- 24 February – Jean Sablon, singer and actor (born 1906)
- 9 March – Paul Dubreil, mathematician (born 1904)
- 28 March – Eugène Ionesco, Romanian-born playwright (born 1909)
- 31 March – Henri Gouhier, philosopher, historian of philosophy and literary critic (born 1898)

=== April to June ===
- 1 April – Robert Doisneau, photographer (born 1912)
- 3 April – Jérôme Lejeune, paediatrician and geneticist (born 1926)
- 9 April – Marcel Ichac, alpinist, explorer, photographer and film director (born 1906)
- 14 April – Jean Joyet, painter (born 1919)
- 17 April – Gaston Charlot, chemist (born 1904)
- 20 April – Jean Carmet, actor (born 1920)
- 29 April – Marcel Bernard, tennis player (born 1914)
- 16 May – Alain Cuny, actor (born 1908)
- 19 May – Jacques Ellul, philosopher, sociologist, theologian (born 1912)
- 3 June – Puig Aubert, rugby league footballer (born 1925)
- 14 June – Marcel Mouloudji, singer and actor (born 1922)
- 16 June – Bernard Moitessier, yachtsman and author (born 1925)
- 27 June – Jacques Berthier, composer (born 1923)

=== July to September ===
- 8 July – Christian-Jaque, filmmaker (born 1904)
- 17 July – Jean Borotra, tennis player (born 1898)
- 19 August – Louis de Froment, conductor (born 1921)
- 16 September – Albert Decourtray, Roman Catholic cardinal (born 1923)
- 23 September – Madeleine Renaud, actress (born 1900)
- 30 September – André Michel Lwoff, microbiologist, awarded Nobel Prize in Medicine in 1965 (born 1902)

=== October to December ===
- 15 October – Jean Dasté, actor and theatre director (born 1904)
- 21 October – Benoît Régent, actor (born 1953)
- 18 November – Henri Choussat, gerontologist (born 1906)
- 30 November
  - Guy Debord, Marxist theorist, writer and filmmaker (born 1931)
  - Louis Gabrillargues, soccer player (born 1914)
- 7 December – Pierre Cloarec, cyclist (born 1909)
- 13 December – Antoine Pinay, politician and Prime Minister of France (born 1891)
- 18 December – Roger Apéry, mathematician (born 1916)
- 25 December – Pierre Dreyfus, civil servant and businessman (born 1907)

=== Full date unknown ===
- Raymond Molinier, Trotskyist (born 1904)

== See also ==
- List of French films of 1994
