= 1996 in France =

- Decades: 1970s; 1980s; 1990s; 2000s; 2010s
- See also: History of France; Timeline of French history; List of years in France

Events from the year 1996 in France.

== Incumbents ==
- President – Jacques Chirac
- Prime Minister – Alain Juppé

== Events ==
- 8 January – Former president of France and founder of the Socialist Party of France, François Mitterrand, dies.
- 29 January – President Jacques Chirac announces a "definitive end" to French nuclear testing.
- 5 May – A fire in Paris destroys much of Crédit Lyonnais bank's headquarters.
- 23 May – Members of the Armed Islamic Group in Algeria kill seven French Trappist monks, after talks with French government concerning the imprisonment of several GIA sympathisers break down.
- 27 – 29 June – 22nd G7 summit takes place in Lyon.
- 8 October – Launch of Renault Mégane Scénic, a five-seater mini MPV based on the floorpan of the standard Mégane hatchback.
- 18 November – Channel Tunnel fire on a truck being carried on an HGV shuttle.
- Full date unknown:
  - Tennis Elbow video game is released in November 1996.

== Arts and literature ==
26 January - 24 March 1996 The Traffic (art exhibition) was on show CAPC Musée d'art Contemporain de Bordeaux

La Dernière Fête produced by Pierre Granier-Deferre was released

== Sport ==
- 29 June – Tour de France begins.
- 30 June – French Grand Prix won by Damon Hill of the United Kingdom.
- 21 July – Tour de France ends, won by Bjarne Riis of Denmark.

== Births ==
- 7 February – Pierre Gasly, racing driver
- 8 February – Lys Mousset, footballer
- 26 February – Bertille Noël-Bruneau, actress.
- 21 March – Adam Ellis, grasstrack and speedway rider.
- 26 April – Laurine Lecavelier, figure skater.
- 9 May – Caroline Costa, singer and TV presenter.
- 13 June – Kingsley Coman, footballer.
- 21 June – Léa Lemare, ski jumper.
- 29 June – Estelle Elizabeth, ice dancer.
- 14 August – Neal Maupay, footballer.
- 15 August – Bahia Bakari, survivor of Yemenia Flight 626.
- 27 August – Estel-Anaïs Hubaud, competitor.
- 17 September – Esteban Ocon, racing driver
- 20 September – Anaïs Ventard, figure skater.
- 22 September – Anthoine Hubert, racing driver (died 2019)
- 27 September – Maxwel Cornet, footballer
- 12 December – Mathéo Tuscher, Swiss-born racing driver.
- 17 December – Anne Kuhm, gymnast.

== Deaths ==
=== January ===
- 8 January – François Mitterrand, President of France from 1981 to 1995 (born 1916).
- 15 January – Max Varnel, film and television director (born 1925).

=== February ===
- 6 February – Jacques Wertheimer, businessman (born 1911).
- 11 February – Pierre Edouard Leopold Verger, photographer and ethnographer (born 1902).
- 14 February – Louis Finot, international soccer player (born 1909).
- 17 February – Hervé Bazin, writer (born 1911).

=== March ===
- 2 March – Célestin Delmer, international soccer player (born 1907).
- 3 March – Marguerite Duras, writer and film director (born 1914).
- 3 March – Léo Malet, novelist (born 1909).
- 17 March – René Clément, screenwriter and film director (born 1913).
- 20 March – Claude Bourdet, writer, journalist and politician (born 1909).
- 22 March – Claude Mauriac, author and journalist (born 1914).
- 24 March – Jean-Claude Piumi, soccer player (born 1940).
- 29 March – Christophe Caze, terrorist (born 1969).

=== April to June ===
- 21 April – Robert Hersant, newspaper magnate (born 1920).
- 29 April – François Picard, motor racing driver (born 1921).
- 25 May – Barney Wilen, saxophonist and jazz composer (born 1937).
- 30 May – Léon-Etienne Duval, cardinal (born 1903).
- 15 June
  - Raymond Salles, rower (born 1920).
  - Yvonne Vallée, actress (born 1899).
- 17 June – François Mercier, footballer (born 1916).

=== July to September ===
- 17 July – Paul Touvier, convicted of crime against humanity for his Collaborationist role during Vichy France (born 1915).
- 29 July – Marcel-Paul Schützenberger, mathematician (born 1920).
- 2 August – Michel Debré, politician and first Prime Minister of the Fifth Republic (born 1912).
- 4 August – André Trochut, cyclist (born 1931).
- 30 August – Christine Pascal, actress, writer and director (born 1953).

=== October to December ===
- 11 October – Pierre Grimal, historian and classicist (born 1912).
- 12 October – René Lacoste, tennis player (born 1904).
- 12 October – Roger Lapébie, cyclist, won the 1937 Tour de France (born 1911).
- 15 October – Pierre Franey, chef and food writer (born 1921).
- 17 October – Jean-Pierre Munch, cyclist (born 1926).
- 26 October – Henri Lepage, fencer (born 1908).
- 31 October – Marcel Carné, film director (born 1906).
- 3 December – Georges Duby, historian (born 1919).
- 3 December – Jean Tabaud, artist (born 1914).
- 9 December – Alain Poher, politician (born 1909).
- 11 December – Marie-Claude Vaillant-Couturier, member of the French Resistance (born 1912).
- 21 December – Alfred Tonello, cyclist (born 1929).
- 25 December – Roger Duchesne, actor (born 1906).
- 25 December – Gabriel Loire, stained glass artist (born 1904).
- 29 December – Mireille Hartuch, singer, composer and actress (born 1906).

=== Full date unknown ===
- André-Georges Haudricourt, anthropologist and linguist (born 1911).

== See also ==
- List of French films of 1996
