= Mbuyamba =

Mbuyamba is a surname. Notable people with the surname include:

- Marie-Bernadette Mbuyamba (born 1993), French basketball player
- Sedrick Mbuyamba Kalombo (born 1995), Italian footballer
- Noah Mbuyamba (born 1998), Dutch Paralympic long jumper
- Xavier Mbuyamba (born 2001), Dutch footballer
