= Ibrahim Ali =

Ibrahim Ali may refer to:

- Ibrahim Ali (footballer) (born 1950), Iraqi footballer
- Ibrahim Ali (politician) (born 1951), Malaysian nativist politician
- Ibrahim Ali (France) (1978–1995), French teenage shooting victim
- Ibrahim Ali (athlete), Egyptian Paralympic discus and javelin competitor
- Sheikh Ibrahim Ali (born 1989), West Bengali politician
- Ibrahim Ali (murderer) (born 1990), Syrian man found guilty for murder in Canada
- Ibrahim Ali (UAE), Emirati footballer at the 2006 AFC Youth Championship
- Ibrahim Ali Tashna (1872–1931), Bengali Islamic scholar and poet
