= 1995 in French television =

This is a list of French television related events from 1995.

== Debuts ==
=== International ===
- 12 February – (United States) Aladdin (1994–1995) (TF1)

== Television shows ==
=== 1940s ===
- Le Jour du Seigneur (1949–present)

=== 1950s ===
- Présence protestante (1955–)

=== 1970s ===
- 30 millions d'amis (1976–2016)

=== 1980s ===
- Dimanche Martin

== Deaths ==
Date	Name	Age	Cinematic Credibility
25 November	Léon Zitrone	81	Russian-born French journalist & television presenter

== Networks and services ==
=== Launches ===
Network	Type	Launch date	Notes	Source
RTL9	Cable television	21 January		
La Chaîne Météo	Cable and satellite	21 June		
AB1 Channel 1	Cable and satellite	1 December		

== See also ==
- 1995 in France
- List of French films of 1995
