= Allan Morante =

French trampoline gymnast

- Born: 13 August 1994 (age 32) Drancy, France
- Height: 180 cm (5 ft 11 in)

Gymnastics career
- Discipline: Trampoline gymnastics
- Country represented: France; (2014–present)
- Training location: Paris, France
- Club: Association Saint Denis Trampoline 93
- Gym: INSEP
Medal record
Men's trampoline gymnastics
Representing France
World Championships
Gold medal – first place	2023 Birmingham	Individual team
Silver medal – second place	2022 Sofia	Individual
Silver medal – second place	2022 Sofia	Individual team
Bronze medal – third place	2015 Odense	Synchro
European Games
Bronze medal – third place	2019 Minsk	Synchro
European Championships
Gold medal – first place	2022 Rimini	Individual
Gold medal – first place	2022 Rimini	Trampoline team
Gold medal – first place	2024 Guimarães	Individual team
Bronze medal – third place	2018 Baku	Individual
Bronze medal – third place	2021 Sochi	Individual team

Allan Morante (born 13 August 1994) is a French trampoline gymnast. He is the 2022 World silver medalist and the 2022 European champion in the individual event. He competed in the 2020 Summer Olympics.

== Gymnastics career ==
Morante began trampoline gymnastics at eight years old after trying swimming.

Morante competed with Sébastien Martiny in the synchro event at the 2015 World Championships, and they won the bronze medal. He was an alternate for the 2016 Summer Olympics. He won the individual title at the 2017 French Championships. At the 2018 European Championships, he won a bronze medal in the individual event.

Morante represented France at the 2019 European Games and finished fifth in the individual final. Then in the synchro final, he won the bronze medal alongside Martiny. At the 2021 European Championships in Sochi, Morante won the team bronze medal with Julian Chartier, Florestan Riou and Josuah Faroux. He was selected to represent France at the 2020 Summer Olympics. However, during the qualification round, he made major mistakes in both routines and finished last out of the 16 competitors.

Morante won a gold medal in the individual event at the 2022 European Championships in Rimini, Italy, and the French team won the gold medal. Then at the 2022 World Championships, he won the individual silver medal to Dylan Schmidt. He also helped France win the silver medal in the team event.

At the 2023 World Championships in Birmingham, Morante won the gold medal in team trampoline with Morgan Demiro-o-Domiro, Pierre Gouzou and Julian Chartier, the first time a French team had done so since 1996.

At the 2024 European Championships in Guimarães, Morante won the gold medal in team trampoline with Demiro-o-Domiro, Gouzou, and Chartier, He was the substitute for Pierre Gouzou for the 2024 Summer Olympics. He had planned on retiring from the sport but decided to keep training for the 2028 Summer Olympics.
