= Comorians in France =

Total population
- 119,300 (Oficial Source)

Regions with significant populations
- Marseille, Paris, Mayotte

Languages
- Shikomor, French, Arabic

Religion
- Sunni Islam

Related ethnic groups
- Black people in France, Afro-French

Comorians in France consist of migrants from Comoros and their descendants living and working in France.

Outside of Mayotte, where Comorians are an important proportion of the local population, a great Comorian community is settled in Metropolitan France, mostly in Marseille.

== Notable people ==
- Soprano, rapper
- Alonzo, rapper
- Rohff, rapper
- Sultan, rapper

== Significance ==
Comorian immigrants make up a significant part of Mayotte's population. In 2011, the number of migrants was estimated at around 40 to 50 thousand people out of a total population of 250,000, and in 2018 this number had risen to at least 130,000 (45% of the island's population). This rate of immigration, caused by the close geographical proximity of the two nations and an unstable economy, poses sociopolitical issues for the territory.

The Comorian diaspora in mainland France is equally significant, most notably in Marseille, which has been described by the ex-president of the Comoros Ahmed Abdallah Mohamed Sambi as "...the fifth island of the Comoros". Other areas with high Comorian populations are Paris.

== Bibliography ==
- Abdou Katibo, 'Les migrations comoriennes en France', Recherches internationales, no. 90, pg. 135-152 (read online)
- Sophie Blanchy, 'Les Comoriens, une immigration méconnue', Hommes & Migrations, no. 1215, 1998, pg. 5-20 (read online)

== See also ==
- Murder of Ibrahim Ali
