= Killing of Evelyn Wilkinson-Lund =

1999 killing

- Date: 29 December 1999
- Location: Rayssac, France
- Perpetrator: Robert Lund
- Charges: Intentional violence resulting in death

Evelyn Wilkinson-Lund (née Wilkinson; 1947 – 29 December 1999) was an Englishwoman who went missing France in 1999. Her body was discovered inside her car in 2001 and her husband Robert Lund was suspected of being responsible. There were three trials in which he was found guilty on different charges. In 2013, Robert Lund was released from prison.

The crime, known in France as the Affaire Lund (English: Lund case), made headlines in Britain and France in the 2000s.

== Events ==
=== Background ===
Evelyn Wilkinson-Lund was the mother of three children. In 1991 she was widowed from her husband of 22 years, a district manager for an insurance company. She met Robert Lund in Darwen, Lancashire the same year. He was a trained tree surgeon working for the Stockport Metropolitan Borough Council. The couple, who were from Lancashire, emigrated to France. In 1997, they settled on a farm in Rayssac (at a place called La Veaute) in the Tarn department. They lived in a 400-year-old farmhouse known as Journey's End. The marriage reportedly faced difficulties following the move to France with Evelyn turning to alcohol. It was alleged during the trial that the relationship was violent. It was said that she had felt isolated being apart from her children from her first marriage and not being among English speakers in the rural French countryside. On 29 December 1999, Evelyn Wilkinson-Lund disappeared along with her vehicle while returning from friends living in Réalmont. She had driven from the home of Marianne Ramsey and was not seen again. On 1 January 2000, her husband alerted the police of her disappearance.

=== Media coverage ===
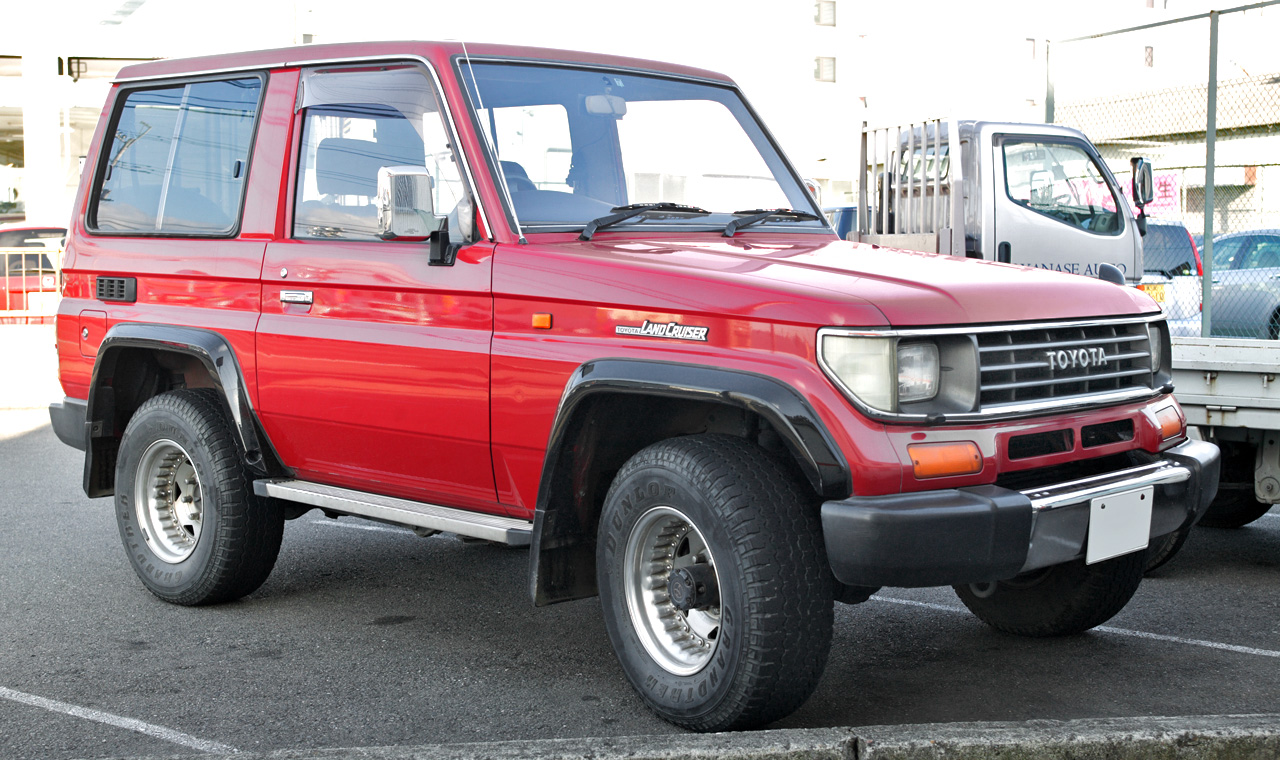
A red Toyota Land Cruiser similar to the car which went missing.

The police began searching for the missing vehicle, a red 4x4. As the region was dotted with lakes, investigators carried out checks on 225 of them and probed 19 of them, hoping to find the vehicle which hypothetically had crashed into by accident. In the initial inquiry her handbag containing her glasses was found at the farmhouse which suggested foul play. After a few weeks, Robert Lund was suspected of being involved in his wife's disappearance. The investigation by French police, carried out in collaboration with England where Evelyn Lund's family resided, reported difficulties in their relationship. On the day of her disappearance, Mrs Lund had taken refuge with friends following an argument. She had subsequently said she was going home to feed her animals on the farm. Robert Lund repeated his claim that he never saw his wife return and claimed his innocence. He was questioned for 22 hours before being released without charge.

In April 2000, the farm was searched, without any significant progress in the investigation.

=== Discovery of the vehicle ===
On 13 October 2001, a horse rider riding along the banks of Lake Bancalié saw the roof of a vehicle submerged at the bottom of the water. The summer drought had caused the water to fall by 30 feet. The police identified the vehicle as the Toyota Land Cruiser that was reported missing. The body of a woman was discovered in the back seats. The medical examination confirmed that the body was that of Evelyn Lund. There were traces of blood on the seat and on her clothes. Due to badly-decomposed condition the post-mortem could not establish the cause of death. An examination of the vehicle revealed that the gearbox had been in neutral when it entered the lake and the engine had been switched on.

=== Investigation ===
The British media produced a report on the tragedy and spoke with Robert Lund, who took them to the scene of the tragedy. The journalists were reportedly surprised by his casual demeanour, even though it was his first time visiting there, so they reported their suspicions to the police. However journalist Clare Cook said "he never tried to hide anything from us and he never resisted too much to me going out to France because he saw it as a chance to clear his name and to facilitate his campaign to prove his innocence".

In November 2004 Robert Lund was arrested by police and held in Albi pending a murder trial. He pleaded his innocence.

=== Trials ===
Robert Lund was imprisoned on 15 November 2004 following his indictment for the murder. He was sentenced three times by a criminal court and twice on appeal to twelve years' imprisonment for "intentional violence resulting in the death" of his wife. The two appeals he subsequently filed were rejected. His "cold" personality and behaviour played a role in his various trials and a major battle between expert reports on the vehicle took place. During his trials, he always proclaimed his innocence. Robert Lund was described as a "cruel, calculating and manipulative bully" who had manipulated a wealthy widow.

=== First trial ===
The initial trial was held in 2007 at Cour d'Assises de Tarn in Albi. The victim's family declined the opportunity for a full inquest. Robert Lund was accused of killing his wife and trying to disguise it as an accident by pushing the car from a rocky cliff above the lake.

The defence stated that the death had been an accidental road accident and drowning death while the prosecution alleged that she had been killed and the accident had been staged for her money from her life insurance. The prosecution case rested on the discovery of Evelyn's spectacles in the farmhouse she shared with her husband. As she had been wearing them when she was last seen, this proved that she had returned to the farmhouse before she was killed, which Lund had denied. Lund claimed that his wife was a violent alcoholic who had once attacked him with a kitchen knife. The court also heard that Evelyn Lund had been suicidal and depressed. On 19 October 2007, Robert Lund was convicted of involuntary homicide.

=== Second trial ===
In 2009, he was retried in Montauban and a number of witnesses come forward to describe Lund's verbal abuse of his wife. The second trial was held in October 2009. He was jailed for 12 years for manslaughter.

=== Third trial ===
On appeal, Robert Lund was granted another retrial in 2011. A friend of Evelyn told the court that she regularly refused to wear her glasses or wear her seatbelt when driving. The prosecution claimed that the motive was financial as she had inherited a large sum of money from her first husband. Robert Lund suggested that his wife may had been drunk driving and therefore lost control of the car and driven into the lake. This was disputed that it was "medically and technically impossible" for the death to have been an accident. The appeal was rejected. In December 2011, he appealed his conviction again.

== Release ==
Robert Lund was released on 14 September 2013 after 9 years in prison. This was criticised by the victim's family. He initially asked for a new retrial. In November he told the Lancashire Telegraph that he wouldn't attempt to clear his name but instead move on with his life. On return to England he attempted to access to her will and assets at Leeds Combined Court.

== Popular culture ==
In 2019, the case was featured in the television programme Missing Turns to Murder on the Crime + Investigation channel. In 2025, the case was covered in an episode of Body in the Water on the True Crime channel.

== See also ==
- List of major crimes in France (1900–present)
- List of solved missing person cases (1990s)

== Television documentaries ==
- « L'Affaire Lund, les lunettes qui accusent » om 17 November 2010 on Enquêtes criminelles : le magazine des faits divers on W9.
- « Robert Lund, le mystère du lac » le 5 May 2013 on Faites entrer l'accusé presented by Frédérique Lantieri on France 2.
- « Le mystère de Rayssac » (troisième reportage) dans « ... à Noël » le 22 and 29 December 2014 and 6 January 2015 on Crimes on NRJ 12.
