= Habib Ben Ali =

Tunisian criminal (1941–1996)

Habib Ben Ali, also known as Moncef El Habib Ben Ali (Tunisian Arabic: حبيب بن علي, romanized: Ḥbīb bin ʿAlī or Tunisian Arabic: منصف الحبيب بن علي, romanized: Munṣif il-Ḥbīb bin ʿAlī; 21 August 1941 – 15 May 1996)) was a Tunisian criminal and younger brother of former president Zine el-Abidine Ben Ali.

== Activities ==
In France, his base was in Belleville from where he managed drug trafficking as well as other criminal activities (procuring, racketeering, etc.). He also owned cafes, pizzerias, agriculture, and real estate as well as import-export companies in IT and luxury cars.

== Trial and sentencing ==
He was sentenced in absentia, in the so-called couscous connection case, on 30 November 1992, to ten years in prison and an indefinite ban on access to French territory by the 14th Chamber of the Correctional Court of Paris. He was accused of having transported money from international trafficking in heroin and cocaine between the Netherlands, France and Tunisia while his lawyer, Jean-Yves Leborgne, denounced a "political manipulation" repeating that he had "no material proof" that Moncef participated in "money laundering." Moreover, Moncef was not present at his trial which began on 17 November.

Following the 2011 revolution, several other members of the Ben Ali and Trabelsi families were arrested and prosecuted.

== Disappearance ==
On 15 May 1996, he was found dead in an apartment in Tunis "in circumstances still not fully understood." Tunisian activist Sadri Khiari suspected he may have been assassinated. He was buried on the same day at the cemetery of Hammam Sousse.

His body was exhumed on 3 May 2012, so it could be autopsied.
