= Pierre Goybet =

French military personnel (1887–1963)

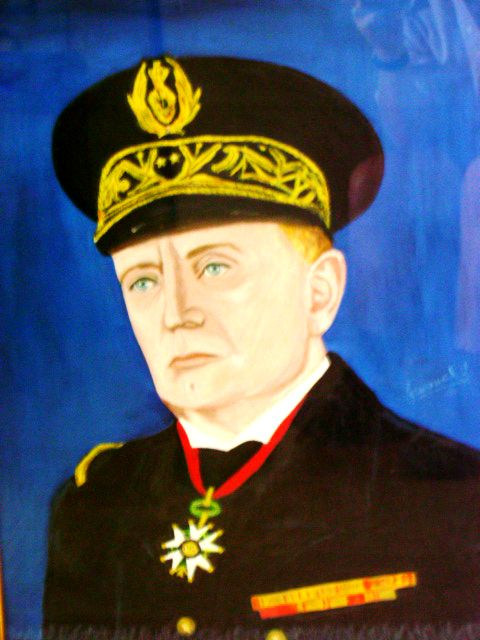
Pierre Goybet

Pierre Goybet (9 June 1887 – 7 December 1963) was a member of the French military in World War I and World War II.

== Early life ==
Goybet was born in Mostaganem, Algeria, the third son of General Mariano Goybet and father of Adrien Goybet, Chevalier of the Legion of Honor, third generation in this decoration.

== Military career ==
=== World War I ===
He took part in the Battle of Verdun.

=== World War II ===
Goybet commanded the cruiser Primauguet and landed at Aruba in the Antilles in April 1940 to protect Standard and Shell Petroleum installations against attacks by the Germans.

On June 25, 1940, he brought a part of the French Gold Reserve from the Banque de France to Casablanca to be protected from the Germans.

In November 1942, he was the commanding officer of the port of Casablanca when the Americans landed there during Operation Torch. He received Generals George S. Patton, Kees, and Wilburg to discuss a ceasefire.
