= Mezri Haddad =

Tunisian journalist, writer, philosopher and diplomat

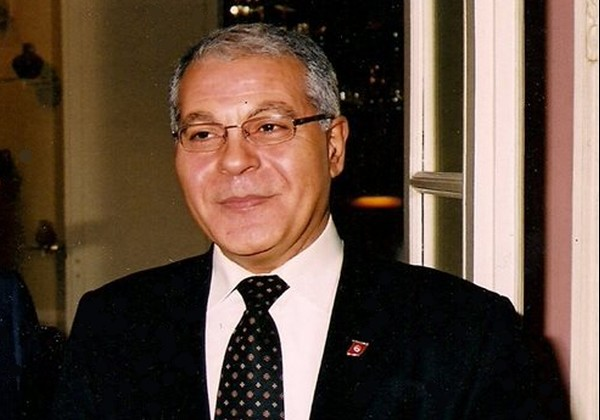
- Mezri Haddad in 2014
- Born: 2 July 1961 (age 65); Le Kram, Tunisia
- Occupations: Journalist, diplomat
- Known for: Tunisian ambassador to UNESCO (2009–11)

Mezri Haddad (born 2 July 1961 in Le Kram) is a Tunisian journalist, writer, philosopher and diplomat. Haddad was a doctor of moral and political philosophy at the Paris-Sorbonne University, and the first Muslim candidate to be qualified by the National Council of French universities as a lecturer in Catholic theology. He is the author of several essays that focus on politics and religion (Islam and Christianity).

He regularly contributes to the press in France (Le Figaro, Libération and Le Monde), Belgium (Le Soir) and Switzerland (Tribune de Genève) and has made several appearances on France 24, LCI, Public Sénat, France Ô and France 2. He was also, from 2007 to 2009, co-director of the Daedalos Institute of Geopolitics, a think tank based in Nicosia created at the initiative of the Cypriot Ministry of Foreign Affairs. In late 2009 he was appointed ambassador to UNESCO, a post he resigned in January 2011 before the fall of Zine El Abidine Ben Ali.

== Youth ==
=== Birth and early years ===
Mezri Haddad was born in Le Kram, in the northern suburbs of Tunis. His father came from Monastir. He spent his childhood and early adolescence in Le Kram in a middle-class family. His father Mohamed, a trade unionist and first-generation activist of the Neo Destour party, belonged to the resistance network in the Menzel Bourguiba region. He was a turner-fitter at the thermal power plant La Goulette. His mother, a native of Mateur, was a seamstress.

After secondary studies in high school in La Goulette, in 1979 Mezri Haddad became a journalist. He signed his first article as "A very angry young Tunisian" in La Presse de Tunisie. It was three years before he signed his second article, "The Wassila effect" in Jeune Afrique. He violently criticized the first lady of Tunisia, at the time an untouchable person. Arrested and then pardoned, he began a career in journalism in the official press with a brief passage in the journal Dialogue and then the daily L'Action tunisienne, from which he was dismissed due to incompatibility with the spirit of this newspaper, the official organ of the ruling Socialist Destourian Party.

Haddad obtained a position with the cultural and artistic magazine of Établissement de la Radiodiffusion-Télévision Tunisienne but resigned in January 1984 during the Tunisian bread riots and left Tunisia for France. He wrote three years later in Le Temps that he felt he had no future in the country. He enrolled at the Sorbonne to study philosophy. In 1987, the year when President Zine El Abidine Ben Ali came to power, Mezri Haddad, long opposed to the Bourguiba regime, had reservations about the nature of the new regime and warned the against general unanimous support and personality cult.

=== Higher education ===
In 1987 Haddad obtained his Diplôme d'études universitaires générales in Philosophy, and a Licentiate in 1988. He then enrolled in sociology and studied under professors Raymond Boudon, François Bourricaud and Bernard Valade. In parallel, he participated for three years in Dominique Chevallier's seminar on the history of the Arab world. In 1989, the year of the fall of the Berlin Wall, he defended his moral and political philosophy masters thesis, entitled "The communist ideology and Islamism: analysis and perspectives", in which he demonstrated the points of convergence between red (communism) and green (Islamist theocracy) totalitarianism. In an article published in Le Monde on 25 April 2009 Mezri Haddad denounced "green fascism".

In 1990 Haddad obtained his Master of Advanced Studies degree on the theme of "Historical materialism and class struggles in Karl Marx." The same year he started his thesis for a doctorate in moral and political philosophy under the direction of Claude Polin. "The issue of the relationship between spiritual authority and temporal power in Islam and in Christianity" was the topic of his 982-page theses which he defended in 1997. According to the jury, by its comparative and multidisciplinary approach Haddad shows that political theology is the biggest problem of all religions and all cultures. The "theocratic disease" is therefore not specifically Islamic. According to Mohammed Arkoun, "by its resolutely comparative and heuristic approach" Mezri Haddad's thesis "is a first in the field of comparative studies of Islam studies and theology that revives the high tradition of philosophical orientalism".

== Professional career ==
=== Journalist ===
After his first efforts in the press of the Destour Socialist Party, and once installed in France, for a long time he was permanent correspondent of the Tunisian magazine Realities. He became editor and columnist until his resignation in 1992 for restrictions on his freedom of expression. He nevertheless continued his fight in the French press and in 1992 signed his first article in Libération about the "Couscous connection". According to the Canadian writer Lise Garon, "Haddad is probably the only Tunisian to have signed an article about the involvement of the president's brother in international drug trafficking." Also according to Lise Garon, "Haddad, who signs his articles in European newspapers with his real name, remains an exceptional case. In general Tunisian newspapers have sided with the general-president."

In 1994 Mezri Haddad was the only Tunisian to support the presidential candidacy of his friend Moncef Marzouki in the Tunisian general election through an article in the French daily Libération of 23 March 1994. According to Reporters Without Borders this edition of the newspaper was banned in Tunisia due to Haddad's article, which condemned the lack of democratic process in his country. The 29 March 1995 edition of Libération was also suppressed in Tunisia due to an article by Haddad that attacked the dictators who collaborated in suppressing the freedom of the people.

=== University ===
Between 1989 and 1993 Haddad served as assistant to Professor Jacqueline Brisset at Panthéon-Assas University – Paris II in philosophy of law and the history of political ideas. From 1991 to 1992 Pierre Aubenque, a specialist in Aristotle, employed him as a researcher at the Center for Research on Ancient Thought, a laboratory associated with the Centre national de la recherche scientifique (CNRS).

From 1999 to 2001 Haddad was a researcher at the Center for the History of Arab and Medieval Sciences and Philosophies, a laboratory directed by Roschdi Rasched and associated with CNRS. At the same time he taught history as an Attaché Temporaire d'Enseignement et de Recherche (Temporary assistant for teaching and research) at Paris Diderot University – Paris VII, assigned to the training and research unit for "Geography and Social Sciences." From 2003 to 2005 he was a temporary teacher at HEC Paris with a seminar called "Religions and Cultures".

== Political activities ==
Early on, Mezri Haddad distanced himself from the regime of President Zine El Abidine Ben Ali. In 1989 he reiterated his criticism of the unanimity and the personality cult that the regime of Habib Bourguiba had already introduced. Between 1989 and 1991 he was one of the few intellectuals to openly challenge the authoritarian drift of the regime in the Tunisian press. He called for dialogue with the opposition, respect for human rights and the opening of democracy. Forbidden to speak in Tunisia, he continued his fight in the daily Libération. This was the only newspaper to carry his articles at the time.

After a three-year delay, France granted Haddad the status of political exile in 1995. Respected by all the opposition movements but not a member of any of them, Lise Garon says that Mezri Haddad became a central figure in the Tunisian political scene. Each article that appeared in Libération triggered a diplomatic crisis between France and Tunisia. Mohammed Mzali said he was the real brains of the Tunisian opposition in exile as well as the bridge between it and the left opposition inside the country. He adds that "Mezri Haddad was one of the few Tunisian intellectuals to take up his pen to defend me publicly, as he did not know me personally. He had left Tunisia in January 1984 after resigning from RTT (Tunisian Radio and Television) where he made his first steps as a journalist. He was not destourien, or a small apparatchik who had just lost his privileges, or an ambitious calculator."

In an interview with the Belgian daily Le Soir in 1997 Haddad denounced the paranoia and "almost pathological susceptibility" of the regime, as well as the fundamentalist threat, while emphasizing the peaceful and democratic means to fight it. Has also called for a return to the spirit and the letter of the Declaration of 7 November 1987 "provided that the evil counselors of the prince finally leave the palace of Carthage". Two influential men seem to have played a decisive role in the rapprochement between President Ben Ali and Mezri Haddad: Mohamed Masmoudi, former Foreign Minister in the Bourguiba era and Béchir Ben Yahmed, head of Jeune Afrique. From 1998 the latter tried to persuade Haddad to break exile and return to Tunisia, but Haddad did not return home until April 2000, a few days before the death of Bourguiba. He then met the president and called for a general amnesty and the return of political exiles in Tunisia including Ahmed Ben Salah and Mzali.

With Haddad's new book, Non Delenda Carthago. Carthage ne sera pas détruite published by Editions du Rocher in 2002 he violently attacked the opposition but did not spare some figures in power, in particular hardliners whom he accused of having radicalized the regime and considerably limited the freedom of expression. Nevertheless, he continued to defend the Tunisian regime, justifying this support by his choice of liberal reformism and democratic gradualism and his rejection of revolutionary alternatives that he said would benefit only the most reactionary elements, including fundamentalists.

In November 2004, following the presidential election, Haddad felt the wrath of the regime because of an article in Jeune Afrique in which he compared Ben Ali to General Franco, called for dialogue with the patriotic opposition and calls for a general amnesty and the return of political exiles. The caciques of the Constitutional Democratic Rally (RCD) party reacted with a violent article against him, published in the same magazine under the title "With Ben Ali, Tunisia knows where it is going. But where is the rudderless ship of Mezri Haddad going?"

In November 2009, after four years in the desert, Haddad was appointed by President Ben Ali as Ambassador of Tunisia to UNESCO, filling a vacancy open since 1996. The RCD reacted very badly to this appointment and, according to Maghreb Confidential, Ben Ali made the decision "against the advice of his senior political adviser, Abdelwahab Abdallah".

== Tunisian revolution ==
Hadadd was responsible for the academic mission of the President of Tunisia, and defended the progressive and reformist line within the regime, along with Mohamed Charfi, Dali Jazi and Slaheddine Maaoui. During the Tunisian Revolution which began on began on 18 December 2010 he supported the regime until 13 January 2011, when he said:

If this situation continues in Tunisia, the mob will go to work. The people are worried. The people in their business, in their home, worry about the surging mobs. And all the mobs in the world are similar [...] This mob then, this flood, this fanatical horde is burning, breaking, attacking public and private property, and soon, if we let them continue, and if we continue to apologize for this anarchy in Tunisia, of course we will have soon these mobs attack people at home, violate them, steal and kill, absolutely.

To everyone's surprise, the next morning Hadadd submitted his resignation from his post as ambassador to Unesco. He did this a few hours before the announcement of the departure of President Ben Ali, to whom he wrote: "If you refuse [the resignation], that would mean for me that I will now serve a democratic state. If you accept it, that will be a deliverance for me and a loss for you." Mezri Haddad was the only ambassador to have resigned after having served fourteen months. Raphael Haddad, a disciple of Bernard-Henri Lévy, paid tribute by writing, "Mezri Haddad offered by his resignation today a shining example of dignity and individual courage. But beyond the remarkable human qualities the decision shows, the resignation is also an extremely powerful political indicator. On 16 February Mezri Haddad declared the birth of the Neo-Bourguibiste movement. He announced the dissolution of this movement in early March in the Tunisian newspaper Le Temps. On 19 August 2011 the party of the Neo-Bourguibian Union was legalized on the initiative of Mohsen Feki.

After the revolution, Mezri Hadadd again chose exile in France, where he continued to lead his fight "for a sovereign, democratic and secular Tunisia" and to fight against the ideology of the Muslim Brotherhood and against Wahhabism, both in Arab countries and in France. He was sued and won a lawsuit against Al Jazeera. The most objective article on the thinking and path of Mezri Haddad remains that the Algerian intellectual Noureddine Dziri published in Jeune Afrique on 5 January 2004 under the title "Mezri Haddad or the dilemma of the scientist and politics".

== Memberships ==
- Société des gens de lettres: Member
- Administrative council of the Daedalos Institute of Geopolitics (Nicosia): Member
- Cercle des libres penseurs Franco-tunisiens (Paris): founder and secretary-general
- Rassemblement des écrivains arabes: Member
- Fondation des philosophes arabes: Member

== Bibliography ==
In addition to numerous lectures in major European universities, American and Arab, as well as numerous articles published in France and Tunisia, Mezri Haddad is the author and coauthor of several essays on politics, philosophy and Islam including:

=== Books ===
- Mezri Haddad (2002). Non Delenda Carthago. Carthage ne sera pas détruite. Autopsie de la campagne antitunisienne (in French). Paris: éd. du Rocher. ISBN 978-2-268-04426-2.
- Mezri Haddad (2004). Des acquis aux défis : les enjeux des élections présidentielles et législatives d'octobre 2004 avec le Cercle des libres-penseurs Franco-tunisiens (in French). Paris: éd. Médiane. ISBN 978-2-915161-09-0.
- Mezri Haddad (2004). L'information et la continuité culturelle entre les Arabes et l'Occident (in Arabic). Tunis: Arab League Educational Cultural and Scientific Organization.
- Mezri Haddad (2011). La face cachée de la révolution tunisienne. Islamisme et Occident, une alliance à haut risque (in French). Tunis: éd. Arabesques. ISBN 978-9938-801-93-4.

=== Articles ===
- " Introduction à la pensée islamique ", Histoire des idées politiques, éd. de l'Espace européen, La Garenne-Colombes, 1990 (réédité en 1991 et 1992)
- " Le politique est coupable, pas le religieux ", L'islam est-il rebelle à la libre critique ?, éd. Corlet-Marianne, Paris, 2001
- " Symbiose et non osmose, diversité et non dilution ", Arabofrancophonie, éd. L'Harmattan, Paris, 2001
- " Islam et athéisme ", Rétrospective, éd. Eska, Montréal, 2000
- " Du théologico-politique comme problématique commune à l'islam et au christianisme ", Pour un islam de paix, éd. Albin Michel, Paris, 2001
- " Réflexion sur l'islam et le christianisme dans leur rapport au personnalisme ", La Personne et son avenir (hommage à Emmanuel Mounier), éd. Au Signe de la Licorne, Paris, 2002
- " Rôle du dialogue des religions pour asseoir les fondements de la paix ", Du dialogue euro-arabe. Exigences et perspectives, éd. Arab League Educational Cultural and Scientific Organization, Tunis, 2003
- " Violence anomique ou violence atavique ? ", dans Raphaël Draï et de Jean-François Mattéi [sous la dir. de], La République brûle-t-elle ? Essai sur les violences urbaines françaises, éd. Michalon, Paris, 2006
- " Genèse de la dissidence dans l'islam des origines ", préface au livre de Moncef Gouja, La grande discorde de l'islam, éd. L'Harmattan, Paris, 2006
- " Peut-on considérer le comparatisme comme pierre angulaire du dialogue entre les religions et les civilisations et comme fondement éthique et épistémologique de la tolérance ? ", Dialogue des religions d'Abraham pour la tolérance et la paix, éd. Université de Tunis - El Manar, Tunis, 2006

== Sources ==
- Arkoun, Mohammed (1992). Ouvertures sur l'islam. Paris: Jacques Grancher.
- "Arrêté du ministre de l'Intérieur du 19 août 2011". Journal officiel de la République tunisienne (in French) (63). 23 August 2011.
- Chagraoui, Mohamed (29 November 2004). "Avec Ben Ali, la Tunisie sait où elle va. Mais où va le bateau ivre de Mezri Haddad ?". Jeune Afrique (in French).
- Charfi, Mohamed (2009). Mon combat pour les Lumières (in French). Zellige, Léchelle.
- "Déclaration de Mezri Haddad, ancien ambassadeur de la Tunisie auprès de l'UNESCO". Le Temps (in French). 1 March 2011.
- Garon, Lise (1998). Le Silence tunisien. Paris: L'Harmattan.
- "La colère de l'ambassadeur de Tunisie chez Bourdin Direct". BFM TV (in French). 13 January 2011. Archived from the original on 22 February 2014.
- "L'ambassadeur de Tunisie annonce sa démission". BFM TV (in French). 14 January 2011.
- "Le Qatar investit dans les banlieues : une tactique pour étendre le néo-wahhabisme". Le Nouvel Observateur (in French). 10 October 2012.
- Loos, Baudouin (11 January 1997). "Mezri Haddad". Le Soir (in French).
- Mezri Haddad (20 October 1982). "L'effet Wassila". Jeune Afrique (1137).
- Mezri Haddad (23 December 1992). "Raison d'État ou raison de famille". Libération.
- Mezri Haddad (23 March 1994). "L'élection du roi de Tunisie". Libération.
- Mezri Haddad (29 March 1995). "Le destin algéro-tunisien". Libération (in French).
- Mezri Haddad (23 November 1995b). "Tunisie, pare-feu à l'Algérie ?". Libération (in French).
- Mezri Haddad (1997). "La problématique des rapports entre l'autorité spirituelle et le pouvoir temporel dans l'Islam et dans le christianisme" (in French). Paris: Université Paris Sorbonne-Paris IV.
- Mezri Haddad (2002). Non Delenda Carthago. Carthage ne sera pas détruite. Paris: Ed. du Rocher.
- Mezri Haddad (7 November 2004). "Où va la Tunisie avec Ben Ali ?". Jeune Afrique (2287).
- Mezri Haddad (25 April 2009). "Vampirisation de l'islam". Le Monde (in French).
- Mezri Haddad (14 January 2011). "C'est d'ici, de l'Unesco, que je dépose entre vos mains ma démission". Le Monde (in French).
- "Mezri Haddad gagne son procès contre Al-Jazeera". Tunisie-Secret (in French). 20 September 2013.
- "Mezri Haddad". Maghreb Confidentiel (in French) (902). 19 November 2009.
- "Mezri Haddad, ambassadeur de la Tunisie auprès de l'Unesco". Réalités (in French). 19 November 2009.
- Mzali, Mohamed (2004). Un Premier ministre de Bourguiba témoigne. Paris: Jean Picollec.
- "Naissance d'un Mouvement Néo-Bourguibiste, cofondé par Mezri Haddad". Tunis Afrique Presse (in French). 17 February 2011.
- Noureddine Dziri (5 January 2014). "Mezri Haddad, ou le dilemme du savant et du politique". Jeune Afrique (in French).
- "Profil de Mezri Haddad". Le Huffington Post Québec (in French).
- Raphaël Haddad (14 January 2011). "La démission de Mezri Haddad dit l'avenir de la Tunisie". La Règle du jeu (in French).
- Reporters sans frontières (1995). "Classement mondial de la liberté de la presse" (in French). Paris.
- Reporters sans frontières (1996). "Classement mondial de la liberté de la presse". Paris.
