= Henri Choussat =

Henri Choussat (24 March 1906 in Montpellier, France - 18 November 1994) was a French gerontologist.

Choussat's father, a medical doctor, moved his family to Lafayette, Algeria, where Choussat spent his early years. In 1920, he joined the School of Algiers, where he passed his baccalauréat at age 17. He began to study medicine and law, eventually focusing on medicine.

Choussat became an intern in 1928. He then married Juliette Clausse, and the two moved to Ménerville, Algeria. Thereafter, he became head of the clinic of Professor Lebon at Mustapha Hospital in Algiers. In 1925, he obtained the "agrégation" of Medicine, then became professor of the Chair of General Pathology, Faculty of Algiers.

In 1962, with the independence of Algeria, Choussat was assigned to the Faculty of Medicine of Bordeaux as professor of Symptomatology, and later Medical Pathology. He focused on Gerontology until his retirement in 1977.

Choussat was a member of the Scientific Council of C.L.E.I.R.P.A. (Centre de Liaison et d'Etude, d'Information et de Recherche sur les Problèmes des Personnes Agées) and also a member of the A.I.U.T.A. (Association Internationale des Universités du Troisième Age). He was a member of the Board of F.I.A.P.A. (Fédération Internationale des Associations des Personnes Agées) and O.A.R.E.I.L. (Office Aquitain de Recherche, d'Etude, d'Information et de Liaison sur les Problèmes des Personnes Agées). as well as a member of the S.G.B.S.O. (Société Française de Gérontologie de Bordeaux et du Sud-Ouest)

OAREIL has established an annual Henri Choussat Prize in his honor.
