= Adrien Goybet =

British soldier

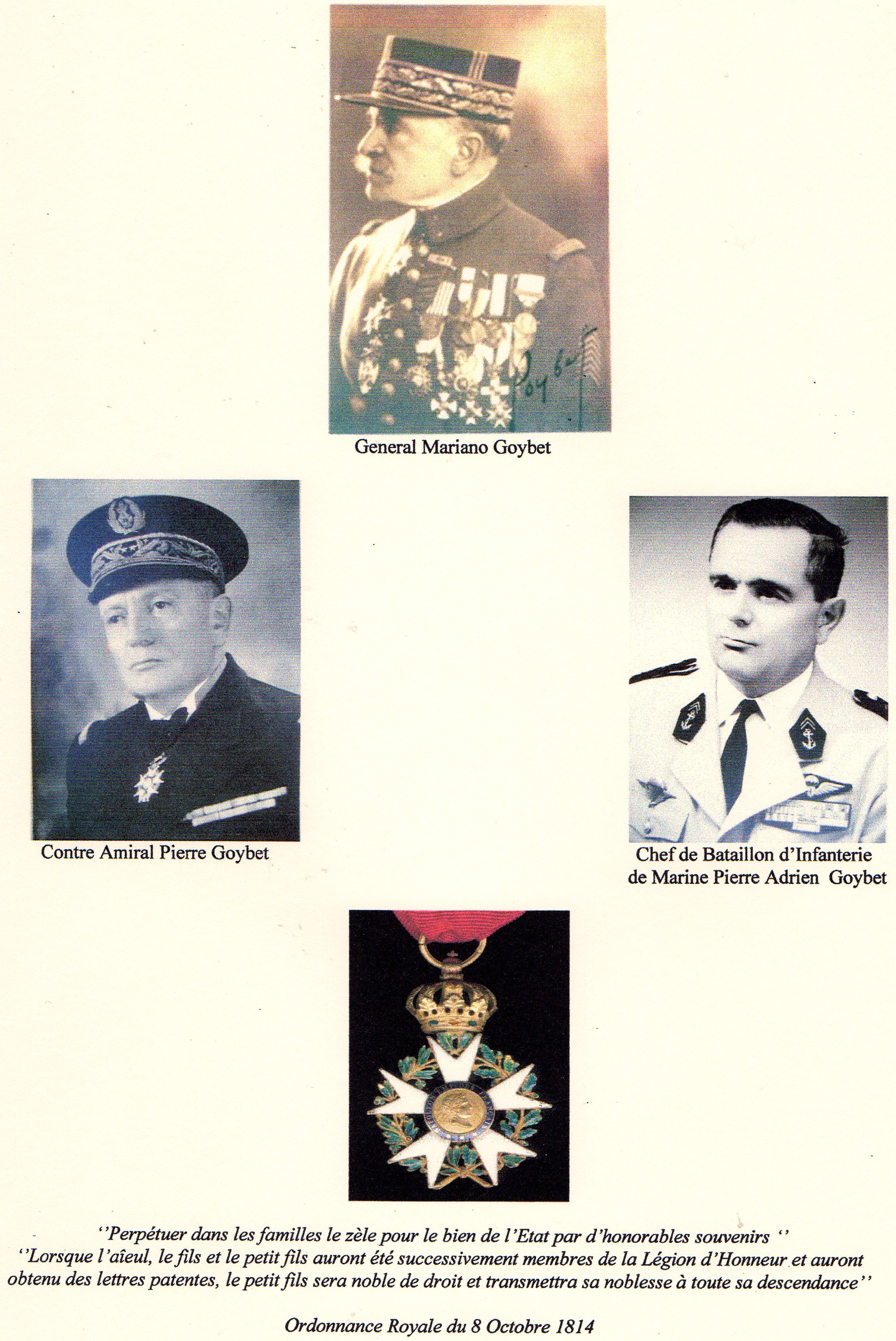
Three generations of Legion of Honour: Mariano Goybet, Pierre Goybet, Adrien Goybet

Adrien Goybet (1922–1995) was the son of Admiral Pierre Goybet and grandson of General Mariano Goybet. He served as chef de bataillon in the Fusiliers Marins. He trained with British Force 136, the Southeast Asian branch of the Special Operations Executive, the British military espionage and covert action force.

In 1945, he parachuted into Cambodia, at that time occupied by the Japanese. He prepared the landing of the troops of General Leclerc. He served in the Indo-Chinese Campaign (1951–1954) as an intelligence officer, and in the Algerian campaign (1958–1961).

He was a Chevalier of the Legion of Honor. The family has three generations of Legion of Honour recipients. The association of hereditary honors (A.H.H.) associates all the families who have the necessary credentials. (Regulation of 1814 by Louis XVIII “to perpetuate in families the zeal for the good of the state by honourable souvenirs”)
