= Michel Quoist =

French Catholic priest, theologian and writer

Michel Quoist (French: [miʃɛl kwa]; 18 June 1921 – 18 December 1997) was a French Catholic priest, theologian and writer. He is best known for his book Prayers of Life, first published in French in 1954.

== Biography ==
Quoist was born in Le Havre, France, to a working-class Catholic family who were involved with the Jeunesse Ouvrière Chrétienne (Young Christian Workers). He began to work after his father's death, at age 14. Quoist sought the meaning of life and entered the seminary at St Jean in 1938. He moved to the seminary at Rouen in 1942, and later was ordained as a priest at Saint-Ouen Abbey in July 1947. His work as both a youth chaplain and a writer was focused on young people.

After Advanced Studies at the Institute of Social and Political Sciences as a researcher and practitioner, he developed a method of inquiry which would later be known as urban classic. He wrote a thesis on sociology of the old Rouen City. Afterwards he returned to Le Havre as a vicar, later becoming a parish priest from 1949 to 1953.

As a post-war chaplain of Catholic Action he published in conjunction with major religious initiatives the 1954 text Prayers of Life, which he wrote as a priest at age 33. This brought him huge success; 2,500,000 copies have been sold throughout the world, and at the time he often appeared on French television and radio. He was diagnosed with pancreatic cancer in December 1996, but decided to forgo chemotherapy fearing it would make him too weak to work. Instead he devoted the rest of time completing his last book, which he did before his death in Le Havre on 18 December 1997.

His books are still being published, with millions of copies having been sold. They have also been translated into 27 languages. His literary work is particularly well known in Latin America.

== Works ==
Some of other titles of Quoist books (date of publication of the English translations from the French):

- Prayers of Life, Gill and Son, 1963. U.S. ed. Prayers, Sheed and Ward, 1963.
- The Meaning of Success, 1963
- The Christian Response, Gill and Son, 1965. ISBN 0-7171-0027-8
- Christ Is Alive, Gill and Macmillan, 1971. ISBN 0-7171-0507-5.
- I've Met Jesus Christ, 1972 ISBN 0-385-02802-4.
- Meet Christ And Live, 1973
- Living Words, Dimension Books, 1982 ISBN 0-87193-196-6.
- Meeting God. Gill and MacMillan, 1985. ISBN 0-87193-222-9
- With Love, Ann Marie: Letters for Growing Up (tr. by Charles Benedict Davenport). Newman Press, 1986.
- The Breath Of Love, Crossroad, 1987, ISBN 0-8245-0852-1.
- New Prayers. Crossroad Publishing, 1990. ISBN 0-8245-0983-8.
- With Open Heart (tr. by Colette Copeland), Gill & MacMillan, 1992. ISBN 0-7171-1818-5.
- Pathways of Prayer (tr. by Hester Pemberton). Wilton 65, 2003. ISBN 0-947828-93-1.
