= 1994 French cantonal elections =

Cantonale elections to renew canton general councillors were held in France on 20 and 24 March 1994.

== Electoral system ==
The cantonales elections use the same system as the regional or legislative elections. There is a 10% threshold (10% of registered voters) needed to proceed to the second round.

== Change in control ==
=== From right to left ===
- Gironde
- Dordogne
- Réunion

=== From left to right ===
- Creuse

== National results ==
Party/Alliance	% (first round)	% (second round)
UF	30.79%	38.25%
PS	22.45%	29.78%
Miscellaneous Right	13.80%	13.57%
PCF	11.39%	7.66%
FN	9.67%	2.62%
Miscellaneous Left	5.38%	6.09%
The Greens	2.59%	0.36%
PRG	1.20%	0.92%
GE	0.89%	0.00%
Miscellaneous	0.74%	0.30%
Far-Left	0.65%	0.43%
Regionalists	0.31%	0.02%
Far-Right	0.14%	0.00%

== Sources ==
E-P
