= Julian Chartier =

French trampoline gymnast (born 1999)

Personal information
- Born: 13 July 1999 (age 26) France

Sport
- Sport: Trampolining
Medal record
Men's trampoline gymnastics
Representing France
World Championships
| Gold medal – first place | 2023 Birmingham | Individual team |
| Silver medal – second place | 2022 Sofia | Individual team |
European Championships
| Gold medal – first place | 2024 Guimarães | Individual team |
| Bronze medal – third place | 2021 Sochi | Individual team |

Julien Chartier (born 13 July 1999) is a French athlete who competes in trampoline gymnastics.

== Background ==
Chartier comes from Vannes, France. He started training on the trampoline at UCK-Nef Vannes.

== Career ==
At the 2021 European Trampoline Championships in Sochi, he won the team bronze medal with Allan Morante, Florestan Riou and Josuah Faroux. At the 2022 Trampoline Gymnastics World Championships in Sofia, he won the team silver medal with Allan Morante, Florestan Riou and Pierre Gouzou.

At the 2023 Trampoline Gymnastics World Championships in Birmingham, he won the gold medal in team trampoline with Morgan Demiro-o-Domiro, Allan Morante and Pierre Gouzou.

At the 2024 European Trampoline Championships in Guimarães, he won the gold medal in team trampoline with Allan Morante, Morgan Demiro-o-Domiro and Pierre Gouzou.
