= Alexandre Ndoye =

French basketball player (born 1992)

Alexandre Ndoye (born March 28, 1992) is a French basketball player who played for French Pro A League club Le Havre. Ndoye was born in Argenteuil, France.
