= Couscous connection =

Illegal drug trade in France

- Years active: 1980s
- Territory: Paris
- Ethnicity: Tunisian
- Leader: Roma brothers
- Activities: Drug trafficking
- Notable members: Habib Ben Ali

The couscous connection was an international drug trafficking gang based in Paris in the 1980s. The gang imported heroin and cocaine from Tunisia via Amsterdam and Brussels to Paris, where they distributed the drugs. The trial of the gang members in 1992 received widespread publicity since the younger brother of the president of Tunisia was charged and convicted in absentia for his involvement in laundering the proceeds.

== Investigation ==
The investigation began in January 1989 after an informer gave drug squad investigators in Belleville, Paris the names of three couriers bringing heroin and cocaine from Amsterdam and Brussels to Paris. The police found that the couriers always used rental cars for which they paid in cash. The investigators obtained search warrants and permission to tap telephones. In one of the couriers' apartments they found 180 grams of heroin, a false Dutch driving license, a sawed-off rifle, savings bank receipts and invoices for jewelry purchases using cash.

The investigators traced links to the "Roma brothers", and gradually built up a picture of the import and distribution networks. One of the leads took them to Hedi Ben Hassen, nephew of Frej Guedoura, chief of special services and national security in Tunisia, and Habib Ben Ali, known as Moncef, the younger brother of Tunisian President Zine El Abidine Ben Ali. In February 1990 the police tried to arrest these two at an airport before they left France for Tunisia. Ben Ali showed his diplomatic passport, explained his relationship to the president, claimed immunity and was allowed to leave.

== Arrest and trial ==
The gang had at least 30 members, of whom 25 were arrested and appeared in court. The leaders of the gang were the six Roma brothers, of whom four appeared in court and two were on the run as of 1992. An international arrest warrant was issued for Habib Ben Ali.

The trial of the "couscous connection", the nickname given to the drug trafficking network, opened on 17 November 1992 in the Fourteenth Chamber of the Paris Criminal Court. Ben Ali was said to have been the bag carrier for the proceeds of the sales of heroin and cocaine trafficked between Tunisia, Amsterdam and Paris, and was charged with laundering drug money and breaking narcotics laws. He did not appear. The normal broadcast in Tunisia of the news program of France's second television channel was suspended during the trial. On 30 November 1992. Ben Ali was found guilty in absentia and sentenced to ten years imprisonment. 23 other gang members, mostly Tunisian, were sentenced to various punishments.

On 1 December 1992, Ben Ali's French lawyer met his client in Tunis. The lawyer gave a press conference in which he claimed there was no evidence that Ben Ali deserved the sentence, and that he had been convicted due to political manipulation. He blamed Islamic fundamentalists for concocting the charges in an effort to tarnish the family's reputation.

Mezri Haddad wrote an article in Libération in 1992 about the "Couscous connection". According to the Canadian academic Lise Garon, "Haddad is probably the only Tunisian to have wrote an article about the involvement of the president's brother in international drug trafficking."

Ben Ali was found murdered on 14 May 1996 in a Tunis apartment. There was much speculation about who had ordered his death.

== Sources ==
- Broussard, Philippe (19 November 1992). "Le frère du président tunisien inculpé d'infraction à la législation sur les stupéfiants M. Habib Ben Ali ne s'est pas présenté au procès de la " couscous connection "". Le Monde (in French).
- "Couscous connection. (Tunisian President Zinc el-Abidine Ben Ali's brother on trial in France)". The Economist. 28 November 1992.
- Deure, Michel (3 December 1992). "Après la condamnation de son client L'avocat de Habib Ben Ali dénonce une " manipulation politique "". Le Monde (in French).
- Garon, Lise (1998). Le Silence tunisien. Paris: L’Harmattan.
- Haddad, Mezri (23 December 1992). "Raison d'État ou raison de famille". Libération.
- "Impliqué à Paris dans un réseau de trafic de drogue Le frère du président tunisien a été condamné par défaut à dix ans de prison". Le Monde. 1 December 1992.
- "La « couscous connection »". Le Monde (in French). 1995-11-03. ISSN 1950-6244.
- Lachheb, Ahmed (19 August 2011). "Was Ben Ali Behind the Assassination of his Brother Moncef?". Archived from the original on 18 May 2015.
- Oumma Media (10 May 2012). "Ben Ali aurait-il assassiné son frère aîné en 1996 ?". Oumma. Archived from the original on 2015-05-18.
- Smadja, Gilles (16 November 1992). "La drogue de Belleville mène a la Mafia". L'Humanité (in French).
