= Marie Hoyau =

French ski jumper (born 1997)

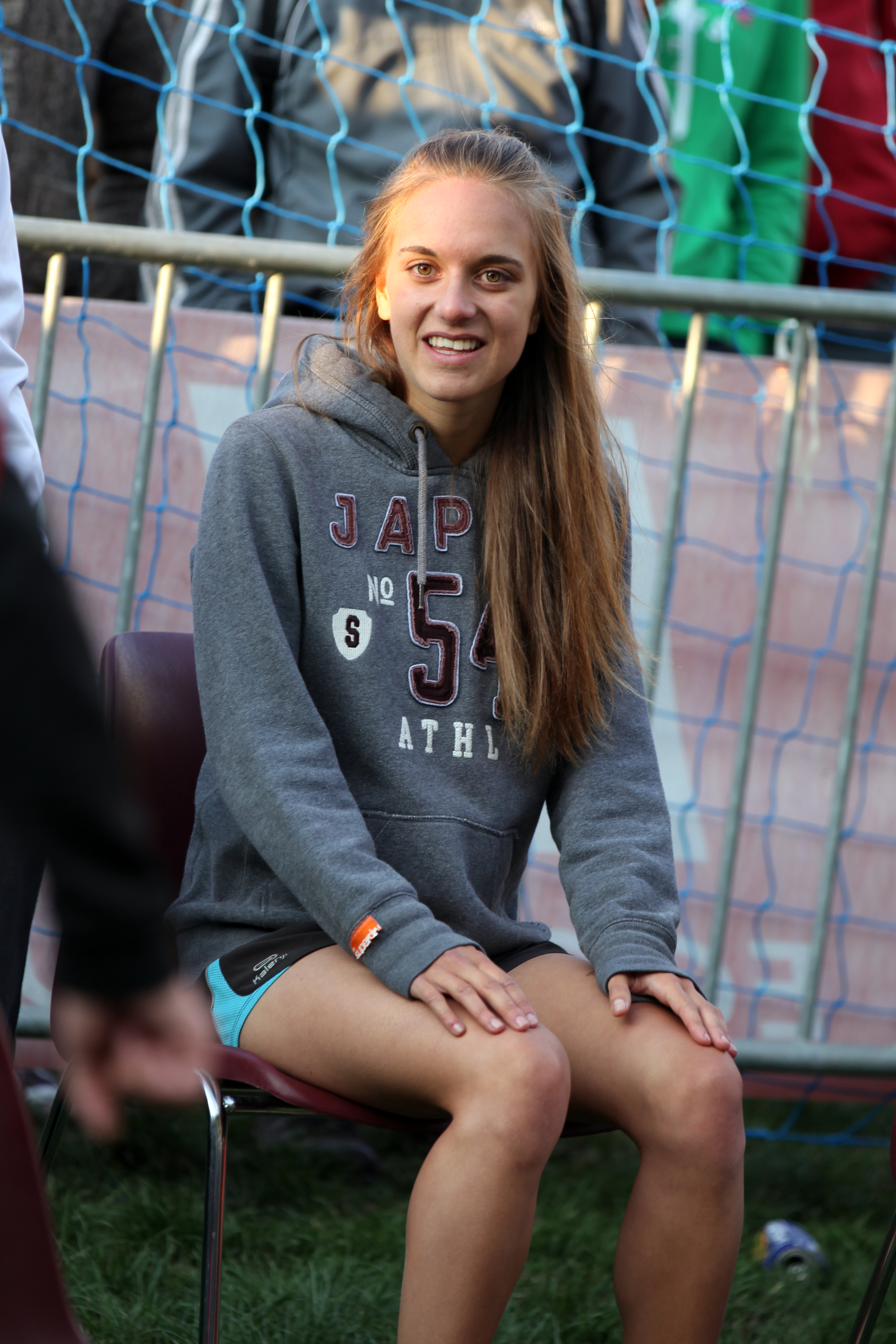
- Born: 12 March 1997 (age 28) Poissy, France
- Ski club: Ski Club St. Gervais

Marie Hoyau (born 12 March 1997, in Poissy) is a French ski jumper.

== Sports career ==
In 2012, Hoyau won her first gold medal at a national competition in Les Tuffes (7 October 2012). On the small ski jump Le Grépon in Chamonix she set the women’s record on 20 January 2013.

From 2012/13 on, Hoyau also takes part in international FIS competitions. At the European Youth Olympic Festival in Romania (19 February 2013) she placed 6th, at the two Alpen Cup events in Einsiedeln and Ziri she achieved mid-table positions. At the FIS Cup competition in Villach (13 and 14 July 2013), which like all FIS Cups was not restricted to junior ski jumpers, Hoyau placed 27th.

The Summer Grand Prix in Courchevel (15 August 2013) was the first international elite competition for which she was nominated by the French Ski Association FFS (Féderation française de ski) as the new talent side by side with the French jumpers Léa Lemare, Coline Mattel and Julia Clair. So at the age of barely 16 she could beat several international professional jumpers and placed 34th (among 47 elite participants).

Hoyau represents her hometown's Ski Club St. Gervais. Her coach is Thierry Revillod.
