= Morgan Demiro-O-Domiro =

French trampoline gymnast (born 1995)

Personal information
- Born: 15 March 1995 (age 30); Nice, France

Sport
- Sport: Trampolining

Morgan Demiro-O-Domiro (born 15 March 1995) is a French athlete who competes in trampoline gymnastics.

== Early life ==
Demiro-O-Domiro was born in Nice, Alpes-Maritimes.

== Career ==
In the 2022 European Trampoline Championships in Rimini with Allan Morante, Pierre Gouzou and Florestan Riou.

At the 2023 World Trampoline Championships in Birmingham, he won the gold medal in team trampoline with Julian Chartier, Allan Morante and Pierre Gouzou as well as the bronze medal in synchronized trampoline with Pierre Gouzou.

At the 2024 European Trampoline Championships in Guimarães, he won the gold medal in team trampoline with Allan Morante, Julian Chartier and Pierre Gouzou.

In sync, he took the silver with Pierre Gouzou.

== Prize list and results ==
=== World Championship ===
- 2023: World team champion and ^{3rd} in synchro
- 2019: 6th by ^{team}
- 2015: 6th individually and ^{4th} by team

=== European Championship ===
- 2024: European team champion and European vice-champion in synchronized
- ^{2022} : European team champion, 6th in synchronized and 14th ^{in} individual
- 2016: 16th ^{in} synchronized
- 2012 (junior): European vice-champion in team and synchronized, 4th in ^{individual} in junior

=== French Championships ===
- ^{2022} : 7th
- 2021: Vice-champion of France
- ^{2019} : 5th
- ^{2016} : 7th
- ^{2015} : 9th
