= Andrée Brunin =

French poet, children's writer and novelist

Andrée Brunin (13 February 1937 – 1 April 1993) was a French poet, children's writer and novelist.

== Selected works ==
- Fille du Vent, poems (Nomad's Land, Paris, 2003)
- La pensée, story for children
- Histoire du petit bonnet, story for children
- Songs of Holidays
- La Pluie verse des larmes d'argent, novel

== Bibliography ==
- Anderson, Jill (Dr, University of Melbourne): "Andrée Brunin, une voix de la Flandre Française", Annales du Comité Flamand de France, 2000
- Brunel-Lobrichon, Geneviève (Dr, University of Paris-Sorbonne): "Échos et profondeurs: des trouvères aux poètes de Flandre", Annales du Comité Flamand de France, 2008
- Christine Duthoit, Femmes dans l'histoire : Hauts-de-France, éditions Sutton, 2017
- Christine Duthoit, Le Nord : patrimoine insolite (chapitre : La maison du vent à Bavinchove), éditions Sutton, 2020
- Top, Damien: "L'invisible présence d'Andrée Brunin", Visages d'écrivains, Fédération des Maisons d’Écrivains et des Patrimoines Littéraires, 2023
- Top, Damien: "La curiosité en éveil d'Andrée Brunin", Plumes de sciences, Fédération des Maisons d’Écrivains et des Patrimoines Littéraires, 2025
