= Certificat d'aptitude à l'enseignement aéronautique =

French Aeronautical teaching certificate

The Certificat d'aptitude à l'enseignement aéronautique (CAEA) is French for aeronautical teaching certificate. It is a French national degree created in 1999, delivered by French Ministry of National Education and Ministry of Ecology, Sustainable Development, Transport and Housing.

Although the CAEA covers a wide field of aeronautics and space knowledge, it is not a pilot licence or certification. It is the degree which conclude aeronautical studies done by students, teachers or professors to teach aeronautic at high school or university.

The diploma is required by the National Education for all supervision of aviation activities at school or university in France. It is also a must to teach the Brevet d'Initiation Aéronautique (aeronautical initiation certificate). The CAEA corresponds to a degree of two-years studies after French Baccalaureate.

The exam to be graduate contains five subjects : principle of flight and aerodynamic, aircraft general knowledge, meteorology, navigation and safety of flights, air and space History. Its duration is three hours. Candidat should obtain a result of 10/20 and no grade below 6/20 in one of the five topic.

Flight Instructors can get the CAEA by equivalence, with only an additional training.
