= Claude Tresmontant =

French philosopher, Hellenist, and theologian

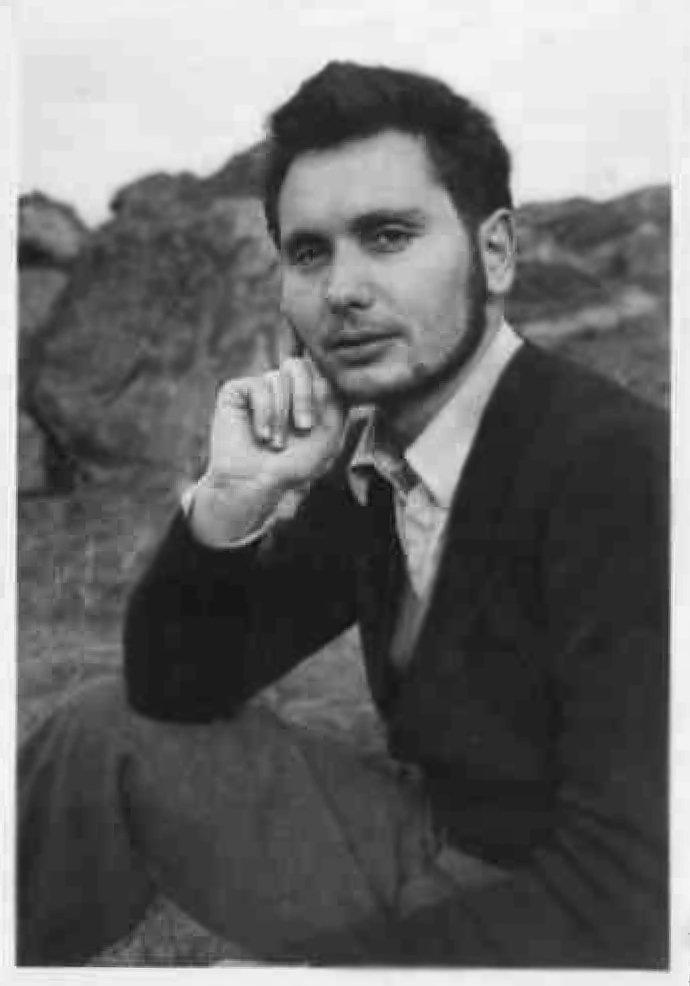
- Born: 5 August 1925; Paris, France
- Died: 16 April 1997 (aged 71); Suresnes, France
- Awards: Maximilien-Kolbe Prize; Grand Prix of the Academy of Moral and Political Science

Academic work
- Discipline: philosophy; Hellenic studies; theology
- Institutions: Sorbonne

Claude Tresmontant (5 August 1925 – 16 April 1997) was a French philosopher, Hellenist, and theologian.

== Biography ==
Claude Tresmontant taught medieval philosophy and philosophy of science at the Sorbonne. He was a member of the Academy of Moral and Political Science. He was given the Maximilien-Kolbe Prize in 1973 and the Grand Prix of the Academy of Moral and Political Science for his complete works in 1987.

== Works ==
- (in French) Essai sur la pensée hébraïque, éd. O.E.I.L., 1953 (republishing 1956).
- (in French) Études de métaphysique biblique, éd. O.E.I.L., 1955 (republishing 1998).
- (in French) Introduction à la pensée de Teilhard de Chardin, Éditions du Seuil, 1956.
- (in French) Saint Paul et le mystère du Christ, Éditions du Seuil, Collections Microcosme « Maîtres spirituels », 1956 (republishing 2006).
- (in French) La doctrine morale des prophètes d'Israël, Éditions du Seuil, 1958.
- (in French) Essai sur la connaissance de Dieu, Éditions du Cerf, 1959.
- (in French) Maurice Blondel. Lucien Laberthonnière. Correspondance philosophique, éd. O.E.I.L., 1961.
- (in French) La métaphysique du christianisme et la naissance de la philosophie chrétienne, Éditions du Seuil, 1961 (republishing 1968).
- (in French) Les idées maîtresses de la métaphysique chrétienne, Éditions du Seuil, 1962.
- (in French) Les origines de la philosophie chrétienne, éd. O.E.I.L., 1962.
- (in French) Introduction à la métaphysique de Maurice Blondel, Éditions du Seuil, 1963.
- (in French) La métaphysique du christianisme et la crise du XIII^{e} siècle, Éditions du Seuil, 1964.
- (in French) Comment se pose aujourd'hui le problème de l'existence de Dieu, Éditions du Seuil, 1966 (republishing 2002).
- (in French) Le problème de la Révélation, Éditions du Seuil, 1969.
- (in French) L'enseignement de Ieschoua de Nazareth, Éditions du Seuil, 1970 (republishing 1980).
- (in French) Sciences de l'univers et problèmes métaphysiques, Éditions du Seuil, 1970.
- (in French) Le problème de l'âme, Éditions du Seuil, 1971.
- (in French) Le problème de l'athéisme, Éditions du Seuil, 1972.
- (in French) Introduction à la théologie chrétienne, Éditions du Seuil, 1974.
- (in French) La mystique chrétienne et l'avenir de l'homme, Éditions du Seuil, 1977.
- (in French) La crise moderniste, Éditions du Seuil, 1979 (republishing 1988).
- (in French) Problèmes du christianisme, Éditions du Seuil, 1980.
- (in French) Le prophétisme hébreu, éd. O.E.I.L., 1982 (republishing 1997).
- (in French) Le Christ hébreu, présentation et imprimatur de Monseigneur Jean-Charles Thomas, éd. O.E.I.L., 1983 (republishing 1992).
- (in French) Apocalypse de Jean, éd. O.E.I.L., 1984 (republishing 2005).
- (in French) Évangile de Jean, éd. O.E.I.L., 1984.
- (in French) L'Histoire de l'Univers et le sens de la Création, éd. O.E.I.L., 1985 (republishing 2006).
- (in French) Évangile de Matthieu, éd. O.E.I.L., 1986 (republishing 1996).
- (in French) L'opposition métaphysique au monothéisme hébreu : de Spinoza à Heidegger, éd. O.E.I.L., 1986.
- (in French) Évangile de Luc, éd. O.E.I.L., 1987.
- (in French) Les premiers éléments de la théologie, François-Xavier de Guibert, éd. O.E.I.L., 1987.
- (in French) Évangile de Marc, éd. O.E.I.L., 1988.
- (in French) Schaoul qui s'appelle aussi Paulus. La théorie de la métamorphose, éd. O.E.I.L., 1988.
- (in French) Les métaphysiques principales : essai de typologie, éd. O.E.I.L., 1989.
- (in French) Les malentendus principaux de la théologie, éd. O.E.I.L., 1990 (republishing 2007).
- (in French) Les Évangiles : Jean, Matthieu, Marc, Luc, éd. O.E.I.L., 1991 (republishing 2007).
- (in French) Problèmes de notre temps : chroniques, éd. O.E.I.L, 1991.
- (in French) La question du miracle : à propos des Évangiles : analyse philosophique, éd. O.E.I.L., 1992.
- (in French) Enquête sur l'Apocalypse : auteur, datation, signification, éd. O.E.I.L., 1994.
- (in French) L'activité métaphysique de l'intelligence et la théologie, éd. O.E.I.L., 1996.
- (in French) Le Bon et le Mauvais. Christianisme et politique, éd. O.E.I.L., 1996.
- (in French) La finalité de la Création, le salut et le risque de perdition, éd. O.E.I.L., 1996.
- (in French) Judaïsme et christianisme, éd. O.E.I.L., 1996.
- (in French) La pensée de l'Église de Rome. Rome et Constantinople, éd. O.E.I.L., 1996.
- (in French) La Prescience de Dieu, la prédestination et la liberté humaine, éd. O.E.I.L., 1996.
- (in French) La question de l'immortalité de l'âme, éd. O.E.I.L., 1996.
- (in French) La christologie du bienheureux Jean Duns Scot, l'Immaculée Conception et l'avenir de l'Église, Éditions du Seuil, 1997.
- (in French) Quel avenir pour le christianisme ? : « Tâches de la pensée chrétienne aujourd'hui » et autres textes sur la problématique générale du christianisme, éd. O.E.I.L., 2001.
- (in French) Réalisme intégral : Claude Tresmontant, métaphysicien de la création; Anthologie de l'œuvre publiée, présentation Paul Mirault, préface Yves Tourenne, éd. François-Xavier de Guibert, 2012.
