= Sadri Khiari =

Tunisian activist (born 1958)

Sadri Khiari (Arabic: صدري الخياري; born on 26 February 1958 in Tunis) is a Tunisian activist. He was an exile in France from 2003. He is active in Indigènes de la République (Movement of the Indigenous of the Republic; MIR) and has written texts with the MIR's spokesperson Houria Bouteldja.

== The Colonial Counter-Revolution in France ==
One of Khiari's books is The Colonial Counter-Revolution in France, a history of 20th-century African and Muslim immigration. Khiari traces the history of French colonialism and decolonization in the post World War II context, as several historical colonies gained independence from France as sovereign states. According to Khiari, the French state and its major political parties consistently pursued racist policies designed to discourage settlement of African, Muslim and Beur immigrants within Metropolitan France, although France was willing to admit foreign workers deemed necessary in a postwar context of reconstruction. The text focused on the periods of Charles de Gaulle and Nicolas Sarkozy, while also identifying the 1983 March for Equality and Against Racism as a seminal event indicating solidarity of African and Muslim populations within France.

== Texts ==
- Tunisie. Le délitement de la cité : coercition, consentement, résistance, éditions Karthala, Paris, 2003
- Pour une politique de la racaille: Immigré-e-s, indigènes et jeunes de banlieue, éditions Textuel, Paris, 2006
- La contre-révolution coloniale en France de de Gaulle à Sarkozy, éditions La Fabrique, Paris, 2009.
- Tunisia: The Force of Disobedience January 2011

English translations at: Decolonial Groupe de Traducción
