= Alexandre Jallier =

French basketball player (born 1992)

Saint Charles Charenton Saint Maurice
- Position: Guard
- League: NM3

Personal information
- Born: 16 June 1992 (age 33) Paris, France
- Listed height: 193 cm (6 ft 4 in)
- Listed weight: 116 kg (256 lb)

Career history
- 2012–2013: Paris-Levallois
- 2013–2014: UB Chartres Métropole
- 2014–2015: Étoile Charleville-Mézières
- 2015–2016: Paris Basket Avenir
- 2016–2017: JS Marzy Basket
- 2017–2018: Vie Au Grand Air Saint Maur
- 2018–2019: Saint Charles
- 2018–2019: Neuilly Sur Marne
- 2020–present: Saint Charles

Alexandre Jallier (born 16 June 1992 in Paris) is a French basketball player.

He started his career with in the French top-tier LNB Pro A with Paris-Levallois during the 2012-2013 season. The following season he signed with UB Chartres Métropole. In 2014, Jallier signed with Étoile Charleville-Mézières in the LNB Pro B.

In 2015, he signed with Paris Basket Avenir of the NM2 and in 2016, Jallier joined JS Marzy.
