= SIVU des Inforoutes de l'Ardèche =

Syndicat mixte des Inforoutes de l’Ardèche
- Formation: November 1995
- Founder: Maurice QUINKAL
- Type: Open mixed syndicate
- Headquarters: 13, avenue des Cévennes; BP 6; 07320 SAINT-AGREVE; France
- Members: Approximately 300 townships : Local authorities of the Ardèche department, of the Drôme department and of the Loire department
- Leader: Daniel SUSZWALAK
- Key people: Maurice QUINKAL (President-founder) and Jacques Dondoux (founder)
- Website: http://www.inforoutes.fr

The Syndicat Mixte des Inforoutes de l’Ardèche (literal translation: Intercity syndicate of the Internet technology of Ardèche) is a public institution of cooperation between municipalities. Since 1995, it has worked to help local authorities master new information and communications technologies. It is mainly financed by the general council of the Ardèche department.

== Framework and legal nature ==
The Syndicat des Inforoutes de l'Ardèche is a "mixed syndicate" (French: syndicat mixte), which is nomenclature existing in France to designate an organisation aiming to improve cooperation within neighboring communities.

== Mission ==
The organisation aims to increase public awareness of the latest developments in information technology. It also trains professionals from the government working in the field of education and local authorities to use the new information and communication technologies in the most efficient way possible.

== Timeline ==
- January 1995: The SMI responded to a call for proposals launched by the government led by Édouard Balladur on the subject of the "autoroutes de l’information" (Internet).
- October 16, 1995: The project Inforoutes en milieu rural (Internet in rural areas) was accepted by the interministerial committee among 685 proposals.
- November 5, 1995: The Memorandum of Association of the SMI was filed with the subprefecture of Tournon-sur-Rhône and later approved by the government of France.
- December 1995: The SMI signed a funding agreement with France Télécom.
- October 1996: The Internet services platform was implemented in Le Cheylard.
- 2009: The SMI signed a financing agreement with Coordination Rhône-Alpes de l'Internet Accompagné (Coordination of internet assistance in Rhône-Alpes).

== Services ==
The organisation provides primary schools, town councils and public institutions of its member municipalities (Etablissements Publics de Coopération Intercommunale; EPCI) of the Ardèche department with computer hardware and assistance with their digital projects. It also coordinates the public network of the multimedia centres in the Ardèche department.

== Subscribers ==
The organisation includes almost all of the Ardèche department town councils and some town councils of the adjacent departments of Drôme and Loire, for a total of more than 300 town councils. It represents 16 town councils communities and 2 intercity syndicates.

== Finance ==
The Syndicat mixte des Inforoutes de l'Ardèche is mainly supported by the general council of the Ardèche department. It also received financial support from European (Feder, Ten-Telecom, Leader II) and national budgets (France Telecom and Datar).

== See also ==
- Telecommunication
- Computer science
- Internet
