= Lisa (French singer) =

French singer (born 1997)

- Born: Lisa Gautier; 26 August 1997 (age 29)
- Origin: France
- Genres: Pop
- Occupation: Singer
- Years active: 2008–present
- Label: Polydor Records

Lisa Gautier (known as Lisa; born 26 August 1997) is a French singer. She is Michel Gautier's daughter and Mylène Farmer's niece.

== Career ==
In 2004, she portrayed the child in the ballet Le Songe de Médée at the Opera Garnier on a choreography by Angelin Preljocaj. Then, two years later, she played in the film Jacquou le Croquant, by Laurent Boutonnat. In 2008, she recorded the single "Drôle de Creepie", the song theme of the French dub of the animated series Growing Up Creepie, whose lyrics were written by Mylène Farmer and music composed by Laurent Boutonnat. In the music video directed by Benoît Di Sabatino, Lisa is dressed as a Gothic Lolita. The song peaked at #6 on the French SNEP Singles Chart in September 2008. Lisa also inspired Farmer's book, Lisa-Loup et le Conteur, published in 2003.
