= Sabri Lontadila =

French basketball player

Sabri Lontadila (born June 29, 1992 in Bordeaux, Nouvelle-Aquitaine) is a French basketball player who plays for French Pro A club Limoges.
