= Tennis Elbow (video game) =

- Genre: Sports game (tennis)
- Developer: Mana Games
- Publisher: Mana Games
- Creator: Emmanuel Rivoire
- Platforms: Windows, Mac OS, Linux
- First release: November 1996 (Tennis Elbow)
- Latest release: June 2021 (Tennis Elbow 4)
- Spin-offs: Tennis Elbow Manager

Tennis Elbow is a series of tennis video games developed by France-based firm Mana Games. Its first version was released in 1996 and as of April 2025, the latest game in the series is Tennis Elbow 4, available for Windows, Mac & Linux platforms.

The game is simulation oriented, and is often seen as being the one offering the most realistic tennis experience in term of rallies and tennis sensations.

The most noticeable particularity of its gameplay is that the users have to hold down the strike button till their player actually strikes the ball, unlike most other tennis games that require the users to release the strike button earlier.

After more than 2 years spent in Steam Greenlight, the 2013 version was released on Steam on March 13, 2015. The game is regularly updated and as of July 2018 has seen 10 major updates for the 2013 edition.

The latest game is called Tennis Elbow 4 and its early version was planned for 2019. It was released on 4 June 2021, and is in early access as of April 2025.

== Games ==
=== Tennis Elbow (1997) ===
The first release in the series allows players to compete in a World Tour of 90 events against 250 players. Single matches can be dirty up and dirty down (two against one) as well as the more conventional singles and doubles. Grass, clay, flexi and cement courts are featured. Action replays can be viewed in slow motion, fast speed, and rewound.

Players can be defined as volleyers, defenders, punchers or varied, with definable kit colours and playing abilities. As you play the game, your player’s ability improves, resulting in faster and more accurate serves as well as faster running and bigger jumps.

The action is viewed from a 3rd-person angle, and side changes are optional. Two buttons are used in combination with directional presses to make slices, 3 different types of lob, and subtle drop shots.

Tennis Elbow 2004 is an enhanced Windows port of the original Tennis Elbow.

=== Tennis Elbow 2006 (2006) ===
Tennis Elbow 2006 allows players to compete in a World Tour of 125 events against 300 players. Both the entry and Champions' Race ranking systems are incorporated - the former covering the last 52 weeks and the latter being fixed over a single calendar year.

Single matches can be two against one, as well as the more conventional singles and doubles. Network and internet play is offered. There are seven distinct court types - clay, grass, hard, blue-green hard, synthetic, indoor hard and indoor synthetic. Action replays can be viewed in slow motion, fast speed, and rewound.

Players can be defined as volleyers, defenders, punchers or varied, with definable kit colours and playing abilities. As you play the game, your player’s ability improves - by more if your lose. Assign these points for faster and more accurate serves as well as faster running and bigger jumps.

The action is viewed from a 3rd-person angle, and side changes are optional. Two buttons are used in combination with directional presses to make slices, 3 different types of lob, and subtle drop shots.

=== Tennis Elbow 2013 (2013) ===
Tennis Elbow 2013 follows the previous instalments in the Tennis Elbow series. It is described as an updated version of the previous title Tennis Elbow 2011 and it is provided for free to owners of that game. It features a simulative approach to tennis, and offers, along with local and online multiplayer, three singleplayer modes: training, single match, and World Tour, a career mode.

The World Tour sees you play with your created player, or an existing one (there are several dozens of real-world unlicensed famous and less famous, including — as to the males — Sampras, Agassi, Kafelnikov, Becker, Stich, Edberg and more, Graf Navratilova Sanchez Vicario Seles and more as for the females) and start from the bottom of the ranking and the smallest tournaments, with the aim to gain the top position in world rank during a span of 15 years. Available tournaments over a whole year are about three hundreds, but low ranked players can not access main competitions.

Gameplay can be tweaked to more or less simulative through options such as turning fatigue on or off, having the indicators of where our shots and the opponent's will impact on the court displayed or not, different CPU levels (6 in total, from "beginner" to "incredible"), and choosing from Arcade, Simulation, Elite "Controls", which impacts the gameplay, making it easier or harder to do good shots.

Player statistics include parameters for power, consistency, precision, for each of the fundamental shots (forehand, backhand, service), plus for volley play (net presence, forehand and backhand volley, smash), fitness (speed, tonicity, stamina), and special skills (drop shot, lob, counter, stamina); parameters range from 1% to 100%. Doubles can be played with four human players on one computer, or on two computers with two players per computer by LAN or Internet, but not on four computers.

The game was Greenlit on Steam and later released on March 13, 2015.

Tennis Elbow 2009 and Tennis Elbow 2011 are versions of Tennis Elbow 2013.

=== Tennis Elbow 4 ===
This game uses the Unity Engine. It launched on 4th June 2021 in early access. As of April 2025, it is still in early access.
