= Carla Ferrari =

French chef (born 1996)

Carla Ferrari (born 1996) is a young French chef and TV presenter.

== Biography ==
Ferrari has been cooking since she was six years old. Although she was born to a family without a preference for cooking, Ferrari was a candidate in August 2008 for the Cuisine Cup, the first European competition of amateur chefs, in which candidates are evaluated by a jury of recognized chiefs, gastronomic journalists and culinary bloggers.

In February 2009, after the elimination of more than 1,500 contestants, Ferrari reached the semi-finals, the jury having selected her for the "salmon duet in small pots, cucumber velouté and small sweet pepper slippers". During the selection phase, Ferrari presented a recipe for "cooked scallops with macaroons, red pesto and risotto sauce with cracked almonds".

In 2010, with the help of 12-year-old Grégoire Souverain, Ferrari hosted Tfou de Cuisine, a TV cooking show on TF1 for juvenile audiences, and advocated against the consumption of junk food by presenting only recipes with fruits and vegetables.
