= Murder of Ibrahim Ali =

1995 murder in Marseille, France

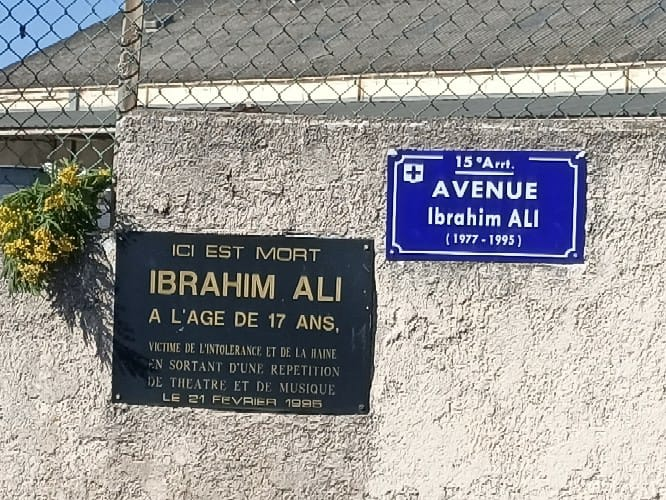
- Location: Marseille, France
- Date: 21 February 1995; 23:15
- Target: Black people
- Attack type: Shooting, Murder
- Weapon: .22 pistol
- Deaths: 1
- Victim: Ibrahim Ali
- Perpetrators: Robert Lagier, Mario d'Ambrosio, Pierre Giglio
- Motive: Far-right anti-immigrant sentiment
- Charges: Murder (Lagier), attempted murder (d'Ambrosio), illegally carrying a gun (Giglio)
- Verdict: Guilty
- Convictions: Robert Lagier (15 years in prison); Mario d'Ambrosio (10 years in prison); Pierre Giglio (2 years in prison)
- Convicted: Robert Lagier, Mario d'Ambrosio, Pierre Giglio

On 21 February 1995, 17-year-old Ibrahim Ali Abdallah was shot and killed in Marseille, France.

== Murder ==
On the night of the shooting, 63-year-old Robert Lagier, 41-year-old Mario d'Ambrosio, and 33-year-old Pierre Giglio, supporters of the far-right Front National headed to the immigrant neighbourhoods of north Marseille to hang posters for their party's presidential candidate, Jean-Marie Le Pen. Under a smiling image of Le Pen, the poster said: "With Le Pen, Three million Immigrants Sent Home". At the Quatre-Chemins traffic intersection in the 15th arrondissement, the men saw ten Afro-French youths, who were members of the rap group B. Vice, on their way home from Mirabeau cultural center, where they had rehearsed a solidarity concert for AIDS victims. The group was running past the three men on Avenue des Aygalades to get to a bus stop for the last scheduled bus, carrying instruments and sound equipment. Robert Lagier drew his .22 pistol from an ankle holster. Ibrahim Ali, a 17-year-old French citizen of Comorian descent, took a single bullet in the back, from which it struck his heart. He collapsed to the ground and muttered "Ils m’ont eu" ("They got me") before dying of blood loss. Mario d'Ambrosio also drew his 7.65 mm pistol and fired a few shots at the retreating Afro-French, though he didn't hit anyone. Nine gunshots were fired in total.

Ali, a resident of La Savine, was buried in the cemetery of Saint-Pierre.

== Aftermath ==
The murder caused protests across France, with a peak of 30,000 participants in protesting in Marseille.

=== National Front response ===
After the incident, Lagier falsely claimed the youths had thrown stones at his car, and he was defending himself. However, police found no dents or cracks on the windshield and no rocks in the intersection around where his car was parked. The National Front backed Laiger completely, forming the "DGL Association" (after their initials) to "help our prisoners". Bruno Megret, considered the successor to Le Pen within the NF, falsely claimed that the men had been "violently attacked by about 15 Comorians". At the trial, Megret refused to apologize to the victim's family on the ground that "there is no collective responsibility in French law", but he praised the FN members as "average Frenchmen" who "deserve respect and dedicate themselves to others, to love of their country and defence of their people."

Jean-Marie Le Pen initially responded to the murder, saying "at least this unfortunate incident has brought to everyone's attention the presence in Marseille of 50,000 Comorians. What are they doing here?" However, following another murder of immigrants by members of the National Front, Le Pen stated, "The people who did this are criminals and should be arrested by the police." Bruno Megret declared, "the blame is on massive and uncontrolled immigration... if our billstickers hadn't been armed, they would have probably been dead." It was noted that Robert Lagier was born in French Algeria, where he lived until Algeria's independence in 1962, and had worked as a construction foreman in Algeria, Saudi Arabia, and Iraq, as Algerian childhood friends had taught him Arabic, which he came to loathe. Additionally, Lagier admitted to brief membership in the French Communist Party after being recruited by work colleagues, though he stopped supporting their cause after the Soviet-led invasion of Czechoslovakia. Mario d'Ambrosio and Pierre Giglio both had Southern Italian immigrant fathers, with d'Ambrosio's father having never gained French citizenship.

=== Legal process ===
In court, Robert Lagier claimed that the gunshots were fired accidentally and that he did not have racist views. Lagier's 16-year-old granddaughter later testified in court that Lagier took her to shooting ranges since she was 8 years old, to what he called training on "how to shoot Arabs". Lagier's daughter-in-law also stated that Lagier almost exclusively referred to North Africans by various anti-Arab racial slurs. During the Algerian War, Lagier was also a supporter of the short-lived far-right terrorist organisation armée secrète.

In June 1998, the Bouches-du-Rhône Assize Court convicted Robert Lagier and sentenced him to 15 years in prison for murder. Lagier had been diagnosed with terminal prostate cancer while in jail. His friend d'Ambrosio was convicted of attempted murder and convicted to 10 years in prison. Pierre Giglio, the third FN man, received a two-year sentence for illegally carrying a gun in his car.

=== Memorial ===
Associations and elected officials from the city of Marseille have tried since the events, without success, to create a day in memory of Ibrahim on each 21st of February. Several other actions have been proposed in order to denounce racism but none have been implemented until 2015, when a memorial plate was installed where the incident took place. In February 2021, with the agreement of mayor Benoît Payan, the city council decided to rename the Avenue des Aygalades to Avenue Ibrahim-Ali. Activists noted that former mayor Jean-Claude Gaudin, who took office four months after Ali's murder, had repeatedly ignored prior attempts to have a street named after Ibrahim Ali.

In 2024, the Ibrahim Ali Price was created in Ali's honor, rewarding communal work by students between kindergarten and primary school.
