= Rayssac =

- Commune
- Coat of arms
- Location of Rayssac
- Location within France Location within Occitanie
- Coordinates: 43°49′08″N 2°24′54″E
- Country: France
- Region: Occitania
- Department: Tarn
- Arrondissement: Castres
- Canton: Le Haut Dadou

Government
  - Mayor (2020–2026): Patrick Carayon
- Area^{1}: 29.95 km^{2} (11.56 sq mi)
- Elevation: 600 m (2,000 ft)
- Highest elevation: 711 m (2,333 ft)
- Lowest elevation: 357 m (1,171 ft)
- Population (2023): 234
  - Density: 7.81/km^{2} (20.2/sq mi)
- Time zone: UTC+01:00 (CET)
  - Summer (DST): UTC+02:00 (CEST)
- INSEE/Postal code: 81221 /81330
- ^{1} French Land Register data, which excludes lakes, ponds, glaciers > 1 km^{2} (0.386 sq mi or 247 acres) and river estuaries.

Rayssac (French pronunciation: [ʁɛsak]; Occitan: Raiçac) is a commune in the Tarn department in southern France.

== Geography ==
The commune is traversed by the river Dadou.

== See also ==
- Communes of the Tarn department
