= List of French films of 1995 =

A list of films produced in France in 1995.

| Title | Director | Cast | Genre | Notes |
|---|---|---|---|---|
| Les Anges gardiens | Jean-Marie Poiré | Gérard Depardieu | | |
| L'aube à l'envers | Sophie Marceau | | Short | Screened at the 1995 Cannes Film Festival |
| Augustin | Anne Fontaine | | | Screened at the 1995 Cannes Film Festival |
| The Bait (L'Appât) | Bertrand Tavernier | Marie Gillain | | Won Golden Berlin Bear, +2 wins, +4 nom. |
| Beyond the Clouds | Michelangelo Antonioni, Wim Wenders | John Malkovich, Sophie Marceau | | |
| The Blue Villa | Alain Robbe-Grillet | | | Entered into the 45th Berlin International Film Festival |
| Bye-Bye | Karim Dridi | | | Screened at the 1995 Cannes Film Festival |
| La Cérémonie | Claude Chabrol | Isabelle Huppert, Sandrine Bonnaire | Drama | 6 wins & 8 nominations |
| The City of Lost Children | Marc Caro, Jean-Pierre Jeunet | Dominique Pinon | Fantasy adventure | Entered at Cannes, +2 wins, +9 nom. |
| Don't Forget You're Going to Die | Xavier Beauvois | | | Won the Jury Prize at Cannes |
| Élisa | Jean Becker | Gérard Depardieu, Vanessa Paradis | Drama | Won 1 & nominated for 2 César Awards |
| El pasajero clandestino | Agustí Villaronga | Simon Callow, Bruno Todeschini, Mercè Pons | Drama | |
| La Fille seule | Benoît Jacquot | Virginie Ledoyen | Drama | Won 1 César Award |
| A French Woman | Régis Wargnier | | | Entered into the 19th Moscow International Film Festival |
| French Twist | Josiane Balasko | Victoria Abril | Drama | |
| La Haine | Mathieu Kassovitz | Vincent Cassel | Crime drama | Nominated for Golden Palm, won Best Director, +5 wins, +10 nominations |
| Happiness Is in the Field | Étienne Chatiliez | Michel Serrault | Comedy | 1 win & 5 nominations (César Awards) |
| The Horseman on the Roof | Jean-Paul Rappeneau | Juliette Binoche, Olivier Martinez | Adventure drama | 4 wins & 8 nominations |
| One Hundred and One Nights | Agnès Varda | | | Entered into the 45th Berlin International Film Festival |
| Les Misérables | Claude Lelouch | Jean-Paul Belmondo | | Won Golden Globe, +3 wins, +1 nomination |
| Nelly et Monsieur Arnaud | Claude Sautet | Michel Serrault, Emmanuelle Béart | Drama | Nominated for BAFTA, +5 wins, +10 nom. |
| Le Nouveau Monde | Alain Corneau | | Drama? | |
| Showgirls | Paul Verhoeven | Elizabeth Berkley, Kyle MacLachlan, Gina Gershon, Glenn Plummer, Robert Davi, Alan Rachins, Gina Ravera | Erotic drama thriller | French-American co-production |
| Those Were the Days | Didier Haudepin | | | Screened at the 1995 Cannes Film Festival |
| Les Trois Frères | Didier Bourdon, Bernard Campan | both directors + Pascal Légitimus | Comedy | 1 win |
| Up, Down, Fragile | Jacques Rivette | | | Entered into the 19th Moscow International Film Festival |
