= Marie-Bernadette Mbuyamba =

French basketball player (born 1993)

Marie-Bernadette Mbuyamba (born January 5, 1993, in Courbevoie) is a French basketball player who plays for club USO Mondeville of the Ligue Féminine de Basketball.
