= The Adventures of Salavin =

1964 film

- Directed by: Pierre Granier-Deferre
- Written by: Rodolphe-Maurice Arlaud; Pierre Granier-Deferre
- Based on: La confession de minuit by Georges Duhamel
- Produced by: Edgar Roulleau
- Starring: Maurice Biraud; Christiane Minazzoli; Geneviève Fontanel
- Cinematography: René Bucaille
- Edited by: Jean Ravel
- Music by: Claude Bolling
- Production company: Horizons Cinématographie
- Distributed by: United Artists
- Release date: 4 November 1964
- Running time: 103 minutes
- Country: France
- Language: French

The Adventures of Salavin (French: Les aventures de Salavin) is a 1964 French comedy drama film directed by Pierre Granier-Deferre and starring Maurice Biraud, Christiane Minazzoli and Geneviève Fontanel. It is based on the novel La confession de minuit by Georges Duhamel. The film's sets were designed by the art director Jacques Saulnier. It was screened at the San Sebastián Film Festival the same year.

== Cast ==
- Maurice Biraud as Louis Salavin
- Christiane Minazzoli as Marguerite
- Geneviève Fontanel as Marthe Lanoue
- Mona Dol as Mme Salavin – la mère de Louis
- Jean Galland as Le patron
- Julien Carette as Lhuillier – un clochard
- Harry-Max as Un clochard
- Charles Bouillaud as Le chef de service
- Dominique Rozan

== Bibliography ==
- Goble, Alan. The Complete Index to Literary Sources in Film. Walter de Gruyter, 1999.
- Rège, Philippe. Encyclopedia of French Film Directors, Volume 1. Scarecrow Press, 2009.
