= Régis Wargnier =

French film director

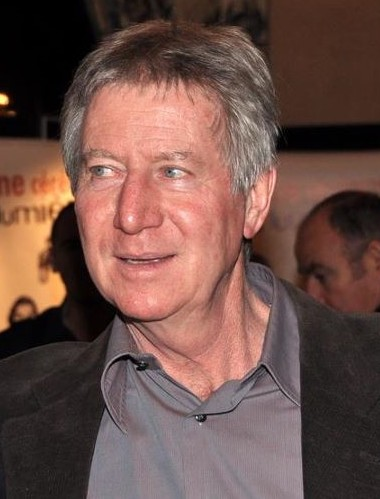
- Wargnier in 2012
- Born: 18 April 1948 (age 77); Metz, France
- Occupation(s): Film director, screenwriter
- Years active: 1973–present

Régis Wargnier (French: [ʁeʒis vaʁɲje]; born 18 April 1948) is a French film director, film producer, screenwriter and film score composer. His 1986 film The Woman of My Life won the César Award for Best First Film at the 12th César Awards. His 1992 film Indochine won the Academy Award for Best Foreign Language Film at the 65th Academy Awards. His 1995 A French Woman was entered into the 19th Moscow International Film Festival where he won the Silver St. George for the Direction.

== Filmography ==
=== Director ===
- 1986 : La Femme de ma vie starring Jane Birkin
- 1988 : Sueurs froides (television series)
- 1989 : Je suis le seigneur du château starring Dominique Blanc
- 1992 : Indochine starring Catherine Deneuve
- 1995 : Une femme française starring Emmanuelle Béart
- 1995 : Lumière et compagnie, collection of short films in cooperation with other international directors
- 1999 : Est-Ouest starring Sandrine Bonnaire
- 2003 : Cœurs d'Athlètes starring Haile Gebrselassie
- 2005 : Man to Man starring Joseph Fiennes and Kristin Scott Thomas
- 2007 : Pars vite et reviens tard starring José Garcia, Lucas Belvaux and Marie Gillain
- 2011 : La Ligne droite starring Rachida Brakni and Cyril Descours
- 2014 : The Gate starring Raphaël Personnaz and Olivier Gourmet
- 2025: La réparation (謎宴) starring Julia de Nunez, Clovis Cornillac, J.C. Lin and Julien de Saint Jean

=== Assistant director ===
- 1973 : La Femme en bleu
- 1974 : Nada
- 1978 : Mon premier amour
- 1979 : L'École est finie
- 1980 : La Banquière
- 1981 : Viens chez moi, j'habite chez une copine
- 1982 : Le Grand Patron
- 1982 : Le Grand Frère
- 1984 : Le Bon Plaisir
- 1984 : Souvenirs, souvenirs

=== Screenwriter ===
- 1986 : La Femme de ma vie avec Jane Birkin
- 1989 : Je suis le seigneur du château avec Dominique Blanc
- 1992 : Indochine avec Catherine Deneuve
- 1992 : L'échange
- 1995 : Une femme française
- 1999 : Est-Ouest
- 2005 : Man to man
- 2007 : Pars vite et reviens tard
- 2014 : The Gate

=== Actor ===
- 1973 : La Femme en bleu
- 1984 : Souvenirs, souvenirs
- 2002 : Femme fatale

=== Composer ===
- 2002 : Femme fatale

=== Special effects ===
- 2001 : Who is Bernard Tapie

=== Producer ===
- 1983 : Heller Wahn
- 1983 : La palombière
