= Confession de minuit =

- Author: Georges Duhamel
- Language: French
- Genre: Novel
- Publisher: Mercure de France
- Publication date: 1920 in literature
- Publication place: France

Confession de minuit, written by Georges Duhamel in 1920, is the first volume in the five-part series Vie et aventures de Salavin. In 1950, this novel was included in the list of the Grand prix des Meilleurs romans du demi-siècle.

== Summary ==
The 30-year-old Louis Salavin lives in the Montagne Sainte-Geneviève quarter and works as a clerk in Paris. One morning, unable to control a strange impulse, he touches the earlobe of Mr Sureau, the chairman of his company. Shortly after this senseless act, Salavin loses his job and slowly becomes dispirited, apathetic, and disgusted with himself. He consequently stays in his room in the modest apartment, located in rue du Pot-de-Fer, which he shares with his mother, who is attentive and affectionate to him. Forcing himself to get off his couch, the only place which gives him shelter and enables him to converse about his condition, Salavin wanders about in the streets of Paris, sometimes to find a job, which would be unlikely, and other times to avoid his friends and his own thoughts. After six months of not working, his only real friend invites him for lunch on Christmas day. Beholding Octave's wife's armpit, Salavin is seized with a new sudden impulse. Tortured by the erotic fantasies this sight generates, he rushes out of his friend's house. In the evening, when he comes home, he must furthermore face his mother's suggestion of an arranged marriage with Marguerite, a seamstress who lives in the same building and whom he is quite fond of. Salavin definitely leaves his house and the life he has led until then and, late in the night, in a pub, confesses his strange story to the reader.

In Nouvelle rencontre de Salavin, a short story attached to the novel in a fable format, Salavin becomes almighty, capable of deciding his own destiny and that of the people around him. He overcomes his fate and fatalism, gaining a job and money, but his power leads him to despair and to suicide. Suddenly, he wakes up and realizes that it was all a dream; groggy with alcohol and fatigue, he had dozed off at the bistro table.

== Reception and influence ==
The critic Charles Du Bos (1882-1939) said of Confession de minuit that the "story is valuable for its familiar straightforwardness, similar to that of rustic furniture that craftsmen used to carve in wood, and where decoration seems to be the signature of a conscience in a good state.

Confession de minuit is considered one of the influences in Albert Camus's writing of The Fall in 1956.

== Film adaptation ==
In 1963, Pierre Granier-Deferre directed the movie Les Aventures de Salavin, with the subtitle La Confession de minuit, starring Maurice Biraud, Julien Carette, Mona Dol and Geneviève Fontanel. It was released the following year.

== Editions ==
- Mercure de France, Paris, 1920.
- Henri Jonquières & Cie, Paris, 1926 – illustration by Berthold Mahn.
- Vie et aventures de Salavin (omnibus edition), Paris, 2008, ISBN 978-2-258-07585-6.
