= A Heart in Winter =

1992 film by Claude Sautet

- Theatrical release poster
- French: Un cœur en hiver
- Directed by: Claude Sautet
- Written by: Claude Sautet; Jacques Fieschi
- Produced by: Philippe Carcassonne
- Starring: Daniel Auteuil; Emmanuelle Béart; André Dussollier; Élizabeth Bourgine; Myriam Boyer; Brigitte Catillon; Maurice Garrel; Jean-Luc Bideau
- Cinematography: Yves Angelo
- Edited by: Jacqueline Thiédot
- Music by: Maurice Ravel
- Production companies: Film Par Film; Cinéa; Orly Films; SEDIF; D.A. Films; Paravision International; FR3 Films Production
- Distributed by: AFMD
- Release date: 2 September 1992 (France)
- Running time: 105 minutes
- Country: France
- Language: French
- Box office: $11.7 million

A Heart in Winter (French: Un cœur en hiver) is a 1992 French romantic drama film co-written and directed by Claude Sautet. It stars Daniel Auteuil, Emmanuelle Béart and André Dussollier. It was chosen to compete at the 49th Venice International Film Festival, where it won four awards and tied with the Silver Lion. It was nominated for Best Film Not in the English Language at the 47th British Academy Film Awards.

It was the second-to-last film by Sautet. He reunited with Béart on his final feature, 1995's Nelly and Mr. Arnaud.

== Synopsis ==
Highly regarded violin restorer Stéphane works and plays squash with his longtime business partner Maxime. After Maxime, who is married, begins a relationship with concert violinist Camille, Stéphane is called in to do some urgent repairs on Camille's violin. Camille begins to fall for Stéphane, and reveals the truth to Maxime. Stéphane's cool reaction confuses Camille, and she lashes out at him for denying his feelings.

== Cast ==
- Emmanuelle Béart as Camille
- Daniel Auteuil as Stéphane
- André Dussollier as Maxime
- Élizabeth Bourgine as Hélène
- Brigitte Catillon as Regine
- Myriam Boyer as Mme. Amet
- Maurice Garrel as Lachaume
- Jean-Luc Bideau as Ostende

== Production ==
Principal photography began on 21 October 1991 to 28 January 1992.

== Music ==
The film features several performances of chamber music by Maurice Ravel, played by Jean-Jacques Kantorow (violin), Howard Shelley (piano) and Keith Harvey (cello). New Zealand musician Jeffrey Grice appears in the film in the role of the pianist.

The film contains only excerpts of Ravel compositions, but the soundtrack album includes them in their entirety, performed by Jean-Jacques Kantorow (violin), Philippe Muller (cello) and Jacques Rouvier (piano). A fourth Ravel composition not excerpted in the film, Berceuse sur le nom de Gabriel Fauré, is on the soundtrack album. The film helped further popularise Ravel's Piano Trio. The track listing:

1. Trio Pour Piano, Violon Et Violoncelle
  - i. Premier Mouvement
  - ii. Pantoum
  - iii. Passacaille
  - iv. Final
2. Sonata Pour Violon Et Violoncelle
  - i. Allegro
  - ii. Très Vif
  - iii. Vif, Avec Entrain
3. Sonate Pour Violon Et Piano
  - i. Premier Mouvement
  - ii. Blues
  - iii. Perpetuum Mobile
4. Berceuse Sur Le Nom De Gabriel Fauré

== Production ==
Emmanuelle Béart practised violin for at least a year before the film began shooting, so that she could convincingly mime the performance sequences.

Béart and Auteuil were in a relationship, and married during the making of this film.

Claude Sautet based it on his memories of reading Mikhail Lermontov's "Princess Mary".

== Reception ==
On the review aggregator website Rotten Tomatoes, the film holds an approval rating of 85% based on 13 reviews, with an average rating of 7.7/10.

Roger Ebert of the Chicago Sun-Times gave the film 3.5 out of 4, and wrote that the film "has the intensity and delicacy of a great short story."
