= Violette Nozière =

1978 French period biographical psychological crime drama film by Claude Chabrol

Violette
- French theatrical release poster
- Directed by: Claude Chabrol
- Written by: Odile Barski; Hervé Bromberger; Frédéric Grendel
- Produced by: Eugène Lepicier; Denis Héroux
- Starring: Isabelle Huppert; Stéphane Audran; Jean Carmet; Bernadette Lafont
- Cinematography: Jean Rabier
- Edited by: Yves Langlois
- Music by: Pierre Jansen
- Production companies: Filmel; F.R.3; Cinévidéo
- Distributed by: Gaumont Distribution (France)
- Release dates: 20 May 1978 (Cannes); 24 May 1978 (France)
- Running time: 124 minutes
- Countries: France; Canada
- Language: French
- Budget: CAD 1,360,000

Violette Nozière, also titled Violette, is a 1978 French period biographical psychological crime drama film directed by Claude Chabrol starring Isabelle Huppert and Stéphane Audran. It tells the true story of teenage prostitute and murderer Violette Nozière, who poisoned her parents in 1933 France.

== Plot ==
France in the early 1930s: teenager Violette lives with her parents, Baptiste Nozière, a train driver, and Germaine Nozière. Unbeknownst to Baptiste, he is not Violette's father, something known only to the mother and daughter. Rebelling against her petit-bourgeois parents, Violette secretly works as a prostitute. She falls in love with student Jean Dabin, whom she supports with thefts from her parents' as well as her prostitution.

Violette's doctor informs her parents that she has contracted syphilis. She convinces them that she has inherited the disease and that they should take a "medicine" which is actually poison. The first murder attempt fails and both survive, although her mother is temporarily hospitalised. On the second attempt, her father dies, while the mother again survives. Violette tries to cover up her crime as a suicide, but is tried and convicted, despite her saying that she had been raped by her father (an allegation which the film neither confirms nor refutes). The jury sentences her to death by guillotine, but a voiceover says that her sentence was commuted by degrees to the point that she ultimately left prison after 12 years, married, and had five children.

== Cast ==
- Isabelle Huppert as Violette Nozière
- Jean Carmet as Baptiste Nozière
- Stéphane Audran as Germaine Nozière
- Jean-François Garreaud as Jean Dabin
- Zoé Chauveau as Zoe the maid
- Jean-Pierre Coffe as Dr. Deron
- Jean Dalmain as Mr. Emile
- Guy Hoffman as the Judge
- Henri-Jacques Huet as Commissioner Guilleaume
- Bernadette Lafont as Violette's cellmate
- Bernard Lajarrige as Andre De Pinguet
- Bernard Alane as Pinguet's son
- Lisa Langlois as Maddy
- Fabrice Luchini as Camus
- Dominique Zardi as Boy in café

== Background ==
Violette Nozière was entered into the main competition at the 1978 Cannes Film Festival, where Isabelle Huppert won the award for Best Actress. At the César Awards, Stéphane Audran was awarded Best Supporting Actress. The film was also nominated in three other categories: Best Actress (Isabelle Huppert), Best Music (Pierre Jansen) and Best Production Design (Jacques Brizzio).

The film had a total of 1,074,507 admissions in France.

The New York Times placed Violette Nozière on its 2004 "Best 1,000 Movies Ever Made" list.
