= Jacques Fieschi =

French film director

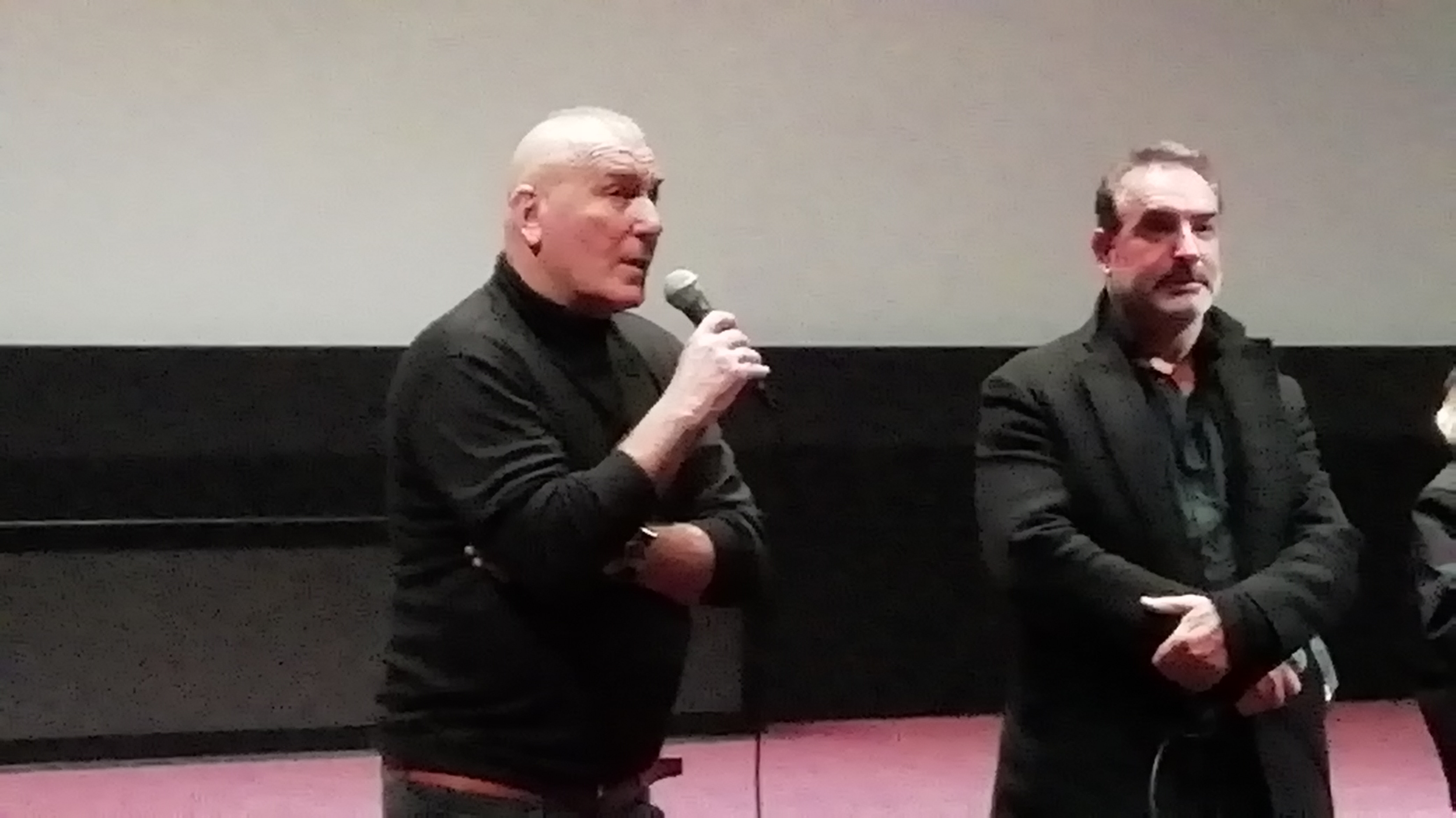
- Born: 1948 (age 77–78); Oran, Algeria
- Education: Aix-Marseille University
- Occupation: Screenwriter
- Years active: 1985–present

Jacques Fieschi (born 1948) is a French screenwriter. He has written for more than 30 films since 1985. He wrote and directed the film French California, which was screened in the Un Certain Regard section at the 2006 Cannes Film Festival.

== Selected filmography ==
- Sushi Sushi (1991)
- A Heart in Winter (1992)
- Savage Nights (1992)
- The Favourite Son (1994)
- Nelly and Mr. Arnaud (1995)
- Irma Vep (1996 - actor)
- Place Vendôme (1998)
- The School of Flesh (1998)
- Sade (2000)
- Sentimental Destinies (2000)
- Nathalie... (2004)
- French California (2006)
- Charlie Says (2006)
- Jimmy Rivière (2011)
- Going Away (2013)
- Yves Saint Laurent (2014)
- From the Land of the Moon (2016)
- The Apparition (2018)
- Lovers (2020)
- Lost Illusions (2021)
- Milo (TBA)
