= The Gate (2014 film) =

2014 film

- Film poster
- Directed by: Régis Wargnier
- Screenplay by: Antoine Audouard; Régis Wargnier
- Based on: Le Portail and Le Silence du Bourreau by François Bizot
- Produced by: Jean Cottin; Sidonie Dumas; Rithy Panh
- Starring: Raphaël Personnaz; Olivier Gourmet
- Cinematography: Renaud Chassaing
- Edited by: Yann Malcor; Véronique Lange
- Production companies: Les Films du Cap; Gaumont; Scope Pictures; Bophana Production
- Distributed by: Gaumont
- Release dates: 29 August 2014 (Telluride); 17 December 2014 (France)
- Running time: 95 minutes
- Countries: France; Belgium; Cambodia
- Languages: French; Khmer
- Budget: $6 million
- Box office: $238.000

The Gate (French: Le Temps des aveux) is a 2014 French-Belgian-Cambodian drama film directed by Régis Wargnier, based on the books by François Bizot. The film debuted at the Telluride Film Festival on 29 August 2014. It was also screened in the Special Presentations section of the 2014 Toronto International Film Festival in September 2014.

== Cast ==
- Raphaël Personnaz as François Bizot
- Olivier Gourmet as Marsac
- Phoeung Kompheak as Douch
- Thorn Thanet as Néang
- Boren Chhith as Lay
- Rathana Soth as Phuong
- Steve Driesen as Father Vernet
