= Les Maîtres =

Book by Georges Duhamel

Les Maîtres (transl. The Masters) is the sixth installment in Georges Duhamel's Chronique des Pasquier series. The novel follows Laurent Pasquier, a research student caught between two rival academics, Professors Chalgrin and Rohner. As Laurent becomes more entrenched in their work, he discovers that the professors' outward admiration for each other masks a fierce competition that eventually boils over into a catastrophic confrontation, leading to devastating consequences for all parties involved.

== Publication ==
- Paris, A. Fayard [1937] (1st edition);
- Sablons, France. Published by ALBERT GUILLOT [1951];
- Mercure de France / Le Livre de Poche [January 1, 1967].
