= Sentimental Destinies =

2000 film

- Theatrical release poster
- Directed by: Olivier Assayas
- Written by: Olivier Assayas; Jacques Chardonne; Jacques Fieschi
- Produced by: Bruno Pésery
- Starring: Emmanuelle Béart; Charles Berling; Isabelle Huppert
- Cinematography: Eric Gautier
- Edited by: Luc Barnier
- Distributed by: Pathé Distribution
- Release dates: 17 May 2000 (Cannes); 12 July 2000 (France)
- Running time: 180 minutes
- Countries: France; Switzerland
- Language: French
- Budget: $14.9 million
- Box office: $4.3 million

Sentimental Destinies (French: Les Destinées sentimentales) is a 2000 French drama film directed by Olivier Assayas. Running from the 1890s to the 1930s, the film tells the story of two wealthy Protestant families in the south-west of France: the Pommerels who make cognac and the Barnerys who make porcelain. It was entered into the 2000 Cannes Film Festival.

== Plot ==
Uninterested in the pottery business, Jean Barnery is ordained as a pastor and marries Nathalie, a woman quite unsuited to the role. When her behaviour with another man excites comment, he sends her and their daughter Aline away with an allowance. When people start commenting that it is worse for a pastor to have a separated wife open to any mischief, he brings her back to the marital home. Then he meets Pauline Pommerel and loses his heart to her. He divorces Nathalie, gives up his calling, marries Pauline, and they move to a rural chalet in Switzerland, where they have a son they name Max. Though the three live simply on income from Jean's shares and are very happy together, as a divorced and unemployed ex-pastor Jean is despised in the conservative local community.

The Barnery business is faltering, and none of the next generation have the clout to run it. When Jean is sounded out, he immediately accepts to be managing director with a mandate to innovate. Pauline is miserable, knowing that being at the top of any business is tough and that a family business is tougher still, but loyally goes along with his choice. Come the 1914 War, Jean takes no advantage of exemption for health, though weakened by tuberculosis, and serves throughout at the front, while Pauline nurses wounded soldiers. Come the peace, he tries to improve quality and efficiency at the factory and to expand sales in the USA, but profits remain elusive and labour relations tense. While young Max seems on the way to playing a role in the business, his daughter Aline goes off the rails with smoking, drinking, dancing, and staying out all night. Then, in a volte-face, the young woman accepts ordination as a Protestant deaconess.

The 1929 Slump makes things far worse. Showing an American visitor round the works, Jean has a fall and from then on is confined to his bed, where he eventually dies. In his last moments, he confesses to Pauline that most of his life's effort was in vain and that the one true thing was his love for her.

== Cast ==
- Emmanuelle Béart as Pauline Pommerel
- Charles Berling as Jean Barnery
- Isabelle Huppert as Nathalie Barnery
- Olivier Perrier as Philippe Pommerel
- Dominique Reymond as Julie Desca
- André Marcon as Paul Desca
- Alexandra London as Louise Desca
- Julie Depardieu as Marcelle
- Louis-Do de Lencquesaing as Arthur Pommerel
- Valérie Bonneton as Arthur Pommerel's wife
- Pascal Bongard as Vouzelles
- Didier Flamand as Guy Barnery
- Jean-Baptiste Malartre as Frédéric Barnery
- Nicolas Pignon as Bavouzet
- Catherine Mouchet as Fernande
- Mia Hansen-Løve as Aline

== Production ==
Principal photography began from 2 August 1999 to 20 November 1999.

== Reception ==
The film opened in fifth place at the French box office for the week ended 18 July 2000 with a gross of $914,658 from 152,443 admissions in its opening week.

== See also ==
- Isabelle Huppert on screen and stage
