= Je suis le seigneur du château =

- Theatrical release poster
- Directed by: Régis Wargnier
- Written by: Régis Wargnier; Alain Le Henry
- Produced by: Yannick Bernard
- Starring: Jean Rochefort; Dominique Blanc; Régis Arpin
- Cinematography: François Catonné
- Edited by: Geneviève Winding
- Distributed by: Acteurs Auteurs Associés
- Release date: February 22, 1989 (France)
- Running time: 90 minutes
- Country: France
- Language: French

Je suis le seigneur du château (English: I'm the King of the Castle) is a 1989 French drama film, directed by Régis Wargnier, loosely based on the 1970 novel I'm the King of the Castle by the English writer Susan Hill.

== Plot ==
The film stars Régis Arpin as 10-year-old Thomas. He lives with his millionaire father a fairly isolated live in a mansion in rural France. His father (Jean Rochefort) hires a woman (Dominique Blanc), whose husband has been reported missing in the First Indochina War, to take care of things while he is away. The maid's son, Charles (David Behar) moves in as well, and the two parents hope that the two can become friends; instead they become enemies immediately. Once their parents fall in love, Thomas decides to make Charles, whom he views as an "invader", as miserable as possible.

== Notes ==
The film was shot at the chateau de Beaumanoir in the Côtes-d'Armor, in the Le Leslay commune. One sees also the countryside of the Huelgoat region and the town of Morlaix (the viaduct and the little streets around the church Saint-Melanie). The film was shot just a few months after the storm of 1987 of which there is visual evidence in the film.
