= Jean-François Garreaud =

French actor (1946–2020)

- Born: 1 April 1946; Montmorency, France
- Died: 9 July 2020 (aged 74); Saint-Jory-de-Chalais, France
- Occupation: Actor

Jean-François Garreaud (1 April 1946 – 9 July 2020) was a French actor.

== Biography ==
Born to a father from Dordogne and a mother from Ardennes, Garreaud became an apprentice tiler at age fourteen. In 1968, he became an accountant for a restaurant, where he learned of the acting industry. His best-known role is that of Jean Dabin in Violette Nozière, released in 1978.

Garreaud married actress Virginie Ogouz, with whom he had two children. He died in Saint-Jory-de-Chalais on 9 July 2020 at the age of 74.

== Filmography ==
=== Cinema ===
==== Feature films ====
- Le Pied! (1974)
- Per amore (1976) - Jean - Marina's brother
- Va voir maman, papa travaille (1978)
- Violette Nozière (1978) - Jean Dabin
- A Simple Story (1978) - Christian
- Mais ou et donc Ornicar (1979) - Jérôme, le médecin
- La Isla de las cabezas (1979) - Pierre
- I as in Icarus (1979) - Vernon Calbert
- Brigade mondaine: Vaudou aux Caraïbes (1980) - Bertil
- Les Filles de Grenoble (1981) - L'Inspecteur Imbert
- Si ma gueule vous plaît (1981) - L'homme traqué
- Guy de Maupassant (1982) - L'homme de la plage
- Le Battant (1983) - Pradier
- Si elle dit oui... je ne dis pas non (1983) - Thierry
- Baby Cat (1983) - Peter Romeux
- Blessure (1985) - Le big boss
- Le Voyage à Paimpol (1985) - Jean-François
- Le Test (1987) - Richard
- Qui sont mes juges? (1987)
- Betty (1992) - Mario
- Le Fusil de bois (1994) - Morin
- Une journée de merde! (1999) - René, le père de Sabine
- Au loin... l'horizon (2002)
- Contre-enquête (2007) - Salinas
- Skate or Die (2008) - Robert
- Ne nous soumets pas à la tentation (2011) - Tristan / Husband
- Je m'appelle Hmmm... (2013) - Le délateur
- All About Mothers (2018)
- Le Calendrier (2020)

==== Short films ====
- Claustro (1984) - Joël
- La Nuit de Santa-Claus (1985) - Gabriel
- Inutile de crier (1987) - Pierlot's friend
- Rossignol de mes amours (1991)
- Bons baisers de Suzanne (1995)
- Omaha Beach (1996)
- Santa (1999)
- Point mort (2000)
- Tea Time (2000) - Léo
- Le Puits (2001) - Le commandant
- Liquide (2004)
- L'Enfant borne (2007) - Homme
- Police matinale (2010) - Tony
- Les Comptes d'Émile (2015)

=== Telefilms ===
- La Substitution (1973) - Terence
- Le Bon samaritain (1974) - Le garçon
- La Dame de l'aube (1975) - Un garçon
- La Pêche miraculeuse (1976) - Paul de Villars (1976)
- La Ville, la nuit (1979) - Paul, le taxi
- L'Éclaircie (1979) - Éric Legoff
- L'Aéropostale, courrier du ciel (1980) - Jules Pranville
- Le Carton rouge (1980) - Grota
- Quatre femmes, quatre vies (1981) - Baptiste
- Vincente (1985) - Chabert
- Le Seul Témoin (1985) - Rémy
- Un aventurier nommé Godin (1985) - Jean-Baptiste Godin
- Bajazet (1985)
- Bing (1986) - Bing
- L'Affaire Saint-Romans (1988) - Germain Saint-Romans
- Les Nouveaux Chevaliers du Ciel Tanguy Laverdure - Le Mystère de l’ASLP (1988) - Dechaumes
- La Comtesse de Charny (1989) - Joseph Balsamo
- Les Cavaliers aux yeux verts (1990) - Elie Rouch
- L'Héritère (1991) - Raynald
- Une partie en trop (1993) - Pavel
- Chasseur de loups (1994) - Warin
- La Colline aux mille enfants (1994) - Robert Vitrac
- Le Cri coupé (1994) - Claude
- Meurtres par procuration (1995) - Cyril Mandel
- Regards d'enfance: Les Faux-frères (1995) - Serge
- Paroles d'enfant (1996) - Simon Gaspart
- Les Allumettes suédoises (1996) - André Privat
- Barrage sur l'Orénoque (1996) - Moperand
- Le Corps d'un homme (1997)
- Langevin: le secret (1997) - Gilles Langevin
- Une femme d'action (1997) - Éric
- L'Assassin pleurait (1998)
- Drôle de père (1998) - Richard Travisse
- La Spirale (1998)
- Le Porteur de destins (1999) - Henri Chèze
- Erreur médicale (1999) - Professeur Dutertre
- La Bicyclette bleue (2000) - Commissaire Poinsot
- Fabio Montale (2002) - Pierre Ugolini, dit 'Ugo'
- Perlasca: Un eroe italiano (2002) - Professor
- La Victoire des vaincus (2002) - M. Marguet
- Jeanne Poisson, marquise de Pompadour (2006) - M. Marguet
- L'Affaire Villemin (2006) - Le ministre
- Premier suspect (2006) - Hadrien Archambault
- La Lance de la destinée (2007) - Henri Mandel
- Drôle de Noël! (2008) - Clodius
- Blanche Maupas (2009) - Le Maire
- L'internat (2009)
- Malevil (2010) - Arbaud de Tréguy
- Jeu de dames (2012) - Commissionnaire divisionnaire
- Les Années perdues (2015) - André Jaeger

== Dubbing ==
- Apocalypse Now (1979)
