= Betty (film) =

1992 film by Claude Chabrol

- Theatrical release poster
- Directed by: Claude Chabrol
- Written by: Claude Chabrol
- Based on: Betty by Georges Simenon
- Produced by: Marin Karmitz
- Starring: Marie Trintignant; Stéphane Audran; Jean-François Garreaud; Yves Lambrecht; Christiane Minazzoli; Pierre Vernier
- Cinematography: Bernard Zitzermann
- Edited by: Monique Fardoulis
- Music by: Matthieu Chabrol
- Production companies: MK2 Productions; CED Productions; FR3 Films; Canal Plus
- Distributed by: MK2 Diffusion
- Release date: 19 February 1992 (France)
- Running time: 103 minutes
- Country: France
- Language: French

Betty is a 1992 French psychological drama film written and directed by Claude Chabrol, based on the 1961 novel of the same title by Georges Simenon. The film stars Marie Trintignant and Stéphane Audran, with Jean-François Garreaud, Yves Lambrecht, Christiane Minazzoli and Pierre Vernier. It was released in France on 19 February 1992 by MK2 Diffusion.

== Plot ==
A man named Bernard picks up a very drunk woman named Betty at a bar in Paris. He drives her to another bar in Versailles called The Hole, where they continue to drink. When Bernard begins acting strangely, a wealthy widow named Laure moves in to protect Betty. Laure and her lover Mario (owner of the Hole), arrange for Betty to stay at the posh hotel where Laure lives. They take care of her over the next few days, but Betty only wants to drink and sleep.

As Betty and Laure drink heavily and get to know each other, Betty has intrusive flashbacks to the events that led up to her being in the bar that night. From a young age, she has been an alcoholic and sexual compulsive. She tried to begin a new life by marrying a wealthy man named Guy and starting a family, but felt smothered by her pampered, Bourgeois life, and haunted by thoughts that Guy only values her as a wife and the mother of his children, not really for who she is. She drank throughout their marriage, but her alcoholism intensified after the birth of their second daughter. As nannies took over her mothering duties, she began sneaking out to bars to pick up men.

One night, Guy and his mother returned unexpectedly from a trip to the theater to find Betty having sex with her boyfriend in the living room.

Guy and his family immediately called a lawyer to draft a divorce agreement. Betty was pressured to surrender all custody rights in exchange for large alimony payments—the first of which she received upon signing the agreement. She was also forced to leave the house in the middle of the night without saying goodbye to her daughters.

It is in the wake of this meeting that she went on the drinking binge and met Bernard.

Still at the hotel with Laure, Betty passes her days smoking and drinking. She pretends to be too sick to get out of bed, and listens to Laure and Mario have sex. She overhears them talk about her with pity, comparing her to a stray dog who will always rely on charity.

Guy tracks Betty down to the hotel and offers to take her back, if only for the sake of their daughters. Betty thanks him, but gently refuses. When she returns to the hotel, Laure says she is going to Paris to see her banker. When she leaves, Betty immediately calls Mario. He comes to her room and they have passionate sex.

The next morning, Laure is back at the hotel (it is unclear if she never left or returned early). She returns to her room, and sees the couple leaving together, on their way to the Hole. In the car, Betty tells Mario that she wants champagne that night, but promises not to drink too much.

Laure checks out of the hotel and apparently returns to her home town of Lyon.

Some time later, Betty's mother-in-law Odile has a conversation with a friend over lunch, and mentions that she read in the newspaper that her old acquaintance Laure Le Vaucher was found dead by a maid. They are both disturbed that a 49 year-old woman could simply die in her sleep.

A voice-over says: “She could never have known that Laure had died because Betty had survived. It was one or the other. And Betty had won."

In a final image, Betty smiles enigmatically as she scoops a goldfish out of the tank at the Hole.

== Cast ==
- Marie Trintignant as Betty Etamble
- Stéphane Audran as Laure Levaucher
- Jean-François Garreaud as Mario
- Yves Lambrecht as Guy Etamble
- Christiane Minazzoli as Madame Etamble
- Pierre Vernier as Bernard
- Nathalie Kousnetzoff as Odile Etamble
- Pierre Martot as Frédéric Etamble
- Thomas Chabrol as Schwartz
- Yves Verhoeven as Philippe
- Jacques Brunet as Le médecin
- Dominique Reymond

== Reception ==
Lawrence O'Toole of Entertainment Weekly rated Betty a B+, praising Trintignant's "smashing performance" and calling the film "Disturbing, compelling, and very smart stuff." In the Chicago Sun-Times, Roger Ebert noted that the film "creates an entirely different order of suspense from the ordinary 'suspense' film. Watching it, in the same week I saw two conventional Hollywood 'thrillers', was like being invited to participate with the depths of my mind instead of just the shallow surface." John Simon of the National Review, in addition to praising the performances of Trintignant and Audran, described Betty as "one of the most well-behavedly bone-chilling horror stories of all time".
