= A French Woman =

1995 film directed by Régis Wargnier

- Theatrical release poster
- Directed by: Régis Wargnier
- Written by: Alain Le Henry; Régis Wargnier
- Produced by: Yves Marmion
- Starring: Emmanuelle Béart; Daniel Auteuil
- Cinematography: François Catonné
- Edited by: Agnès Schwab; Geneviève Winding
- Music by: Patrick Doyle
- Distributed by: UGC Distribution
- Release date: 15 March 1995
- Running time: 100 minutes
- Country: France
- Language: French
- Budget: $11.7 million
- Box office: $6.5 million

A French Woman (French: Une femme française) is a 1995 French drama film directed by Régis Wargnier.

== Plot ==
Shortly after marrying Louis (Daniel Auteuil), a French military officer, Jeanne (Emmanuelle Béart) must face solitude as Louis is sent to fight in World War II. While waiting for his return from a POW camp, Jeanne gets involved in different affairs with her husband's comrades-in-arms. When he finally returns home and finds out about his wife's cheating, he forgives her and offers her freedom, but she refuses to accept and they come back together. Looking for a new life, the family (now with two twins) move to Berlin, where Jeanne meets Matthias, a German industrialist who falls in love with her. A third child is born and shortly after, Louis is summoned to the First Indochina War, forcing his family to return to France.

During her husband's absence, Jeanne gets involved in an affair with Matthias, who has followed her to France. They try to escape with the children but their attempt is frustrated by Louis' brother. Louis returns home and, in an attempt to get Matthias out of her life, Jeanne uses her influence to move the family to Damascus. Despite her apparent success, she asks Matthias to go to Damascus and take her with him. When he shows up, Louis fights him but is severely injured by Jeanne. The family returns to France, where Louis is asked to fight in Algeria. Haunted by loneliness and despair, Jeanne once again finds Matthias, but he breaks up with her for good. Louis returns and meets his family, but he has to part again. During his absence, Jeanne dies without a cause, but he later finds in her purse a newspaper clipping informing of Matthias' death.

== Cast ==
- Emmanuelle Béart as Jeanne
- Daniel Auteuil as Louis
- Gabriel Barylli as Mathias Behrens
- Jean-Claude Brialy as Arnoult
- Geneviève Casile as Solange
- Michel Etcheverry as Charles
- Laurence Masliah as Helene
- Jean-Noël Brouté as Marc
- Isabelle Guiard as Mathilde
- François Caron as Andre
- Maria Fitzi as Liseul
- Samuel Le Bihan as Henri
- Pierre Cassignard as The Inspector

== Production ==
Filming began in August 1994 in Nancy, where the Place Stanislas was covered in sand to restore its pre-World War II appearance. The production also shot on the parvis of the Basilique Saint-Epvre and in a building on the avenue Anatole-France where the director reconstructed his childhood apartment.

The production also traveled to shoot at the ruins of the ancient city of Apamea in Syria.

== Awards ==
- 19th Moscow International Film Festival
  - Silver St. George for the Direction: Régis Wargnier
  - Silver St. George (Best Actor): Gabriel Barylli
  - Silver St. George (Best Actress): Emmanuelle Béart
