= The Sun Also Rises (1957 film) =

1957 film by Henry King

- Australian film poster
- Directed by: Henry King
- Screenplay by: Peter Viertel
- Based on: The Sun Also Rises by Ernest Hemingway
- Produced by: Darryl F. Zanuck
- Starring: Tyrone Power; Ava Gardner; Mel Ferrer; Errol Flynn
- Cinematography: Leo Tover
- Edited by: William Mace
- Music by: Hugo Friedhofer
- Distributed by: 20th Century Fox
- Release date: August 23, 1957
- Running time: 130 minutes
- Country: United States
- Language: English
- Budget: $3.5 million
- Box office: $3,815,000 (US rentals)

The Sun Also Rises, alternatively known as ¡Fiesta!, is a 1957 American drama film adaptation of the 1926 Ernest Hemingway novel of the same name directed by Henry King. The screenplay was written by Peter Viertel and it starred Tyrone Power, Ava Gardner, Mel Ferrer, and Errol Flynn. Much of it was filmed on location in France and Spain as well as Mexico in Cinemascope and color by Deluxe. A highlight of the film is the famous "running of the bulls" in Pamplona, Spain and two bullfights.

== Plot ==
A group of disillusioned American expatriate writers live a dissolute, hedonistic lifestyle in France and Spain in the 1920s.

== Cast ==
- Tyrone Power as Jake Barnes
- Ava Gardner as Lady Brett Ashley
- Mel Ferrer as Robert Cohn
- Errol Flynn as Mike Campbell
- Eddie Albert as Bill Gorton
- Gregory Ratoff as Count Mippipopolous
- Juliette Gréco as Georgette Aubin
- Marcel Dalio as Zizi
- Henry Daniell as Army doctor
- Bob Cunningham as Harris
- Danik Patisson as Marie
- Robert Evans as Pedro Romero
- Lilia Guízar as Jake's secretary (uncredited)

== Production notes ==
=== Development ===
Film rights to the novel were sold in the late 1920s for a reported $10,000. These rights were transferred to Hemingway's first wife, Hadley Richardson, by the author at the time of their divorce, so he never personally benefited from the sale.

Originally the film was going to be made at RKO, possibly starring Ann Harding. In 1940 agent-producer Charles Feldman bought the rights from Harding's one-time husband, actor Harry Bannister, for a reported $35,000.

In 1948, it was announced Howard Hawks had bought the film rights. He subsequently sold part of his interest to Feldman, but the project did not go beyond the development stage. In 1955, Hawks and Feldman sold the rights of the novel to Darryl F. Zanuck at 20th Century Fox, who still hoped to use Hawks as director. This plan was part of a deal whereby Feldman sold his interest in a number of projects to Fox – the others included Heaven Knows, Mr Allison, The Wayward Bus and Oh Men! Oh Women!. Of this deal, the rights to The Sun Also Rises were estimated at $125,000.

Zanuck hired Peter Viertel to write the script. Viertel later reflected:

The long lapse of time since the book was published will not cause it to lose its value. The story is ageless. It should renew its impact for our modern generation. It is fascinating in its impressions of Europe after World War I, because so many of these impressions are duplicated again today.

=== Casting ===
Zanuck wanted the lead played by Gregory Peck, who had appeared in several Hemingway adaptations, including the popular The Snows of Kilimanjaro. Jennifer Jones signed to play Lady Brett.

The movie became the first to be produced for Zanuck's own independent production company following his departure from Fox (but Fox would distribute).

Cinematographer Charles Clarke started filming bullfighting sequences in Pamplona in June 1956.

Henry King signed to direct and Walter Reisch to produce. Jennifer Jones had to pull out from the film because of her commitment to make A Farewell to Arms for her husband David O. Selznick. Dana Wynter and Robert Stack were mentioned as possible leads. Ava Gardner was announced for the female lead, but then pulled out to make Thieves Market with William Wyler, so Susan Hayward was cast in her place.

However, Hemingway insisted that Gardner play Lady Brett so Zanuck went after her and succeeded in getting her to sign. "I am convinced Lady Brett Ashley is the most interesting character I have ever played", said Gardner.

Zanuck later claimed that the casting of Gardner forced the film to be postponed from September 1956 to February 1957. This meant the film could not be shot in Pamplona "unless we wanted to shoot a fiesta in the snow". It was decided to film it in Mexico.

In February 1957, Tyrone Power signed to play the male lead. Mel Ferrer then joined, followed by Eddie Albert and Errol Flynn. Singer Juliette Gréco was given a role after being spotted singing in a cafe by Mel Ferrer and Audrey Hepburn.

Walter Reisch withdrew as producer because of his other commitments to Fox, and Zanuck decided to produce the movie.

Producer Darryl F. Zanuck spotted suit salesman Robert Evans at the El Morocco and decided to cast him as the young bullfighter Pedro Romero in the film. He did this against the wishes of co-stars Ava Gardner and Tyrone Power, as well as Hemingway himself. Zanuck overruled all involved, and Evans – who later became a popular producer himself – used Zanuck's response as the title for his 1994 autobiography The Kid Stays in the Picture.

=== Production ===
Filming started March 1957 in Morelia, Michoacán, Mexico. (It had been intended to shoot in Pamplona but the trees were not in foliage and the production could not afford to wait.) There was also shooting in Spain and France.

Although Hemingway's novel had an undefined "mid-1920s" setting when it was published in 1926, the film adaptation places the story around 1922. The film uses the song "You Do Something to Me", which was not written until 1929, as a motif.

Zanuck had intended to shoot some scenes on the Fox backlot in Hollywood, but he changed his mind and took the unit to Paris and Biarritz. This change added an estimated $250,000 to the budget.

== Reception ==
=== Ernest Hemingway's reaction ===
Ernest Hemingway saw the film but walked out stating:

I saw as much of Darryl Zanuck's splashy Cook's tour of Europe's lost generation bistros, bullfights, and more bistros...It's pretty disappointing and that's being gracious. Most of my story was set in Pamplona so they shot the film in Mexico. You're meant to be in Spain and all you see walking around are nothing but Mexicans...It looked pretty silly. The bulls were mighty small for a start, and it looked like they had big horns on them for the day. I guess the best thing about the film was Errol Flynn.

"That was a kind of lousy thing to say about my picture before the reviews came out", said Zanuck:

I think a writer is entitled to criticize if there is a complete distortion. But if he sees that there has been a serious attempt to put his story on the screen, even if it failed in some instances, he doesn't have the right to destroy publicly something he's been paid money for...Over 60% of the dialogue in the picture is out of Hemingway's book...We treated it as something Holy...We showed the script to him and he made some changes. We even showed it to him again after the changes were made... If the picture doesn't satisfy Hemingway he should read the book again...because the book won't satisfy him...I don't think he saw the picture. I think someone told him about it.

Flynn's performance was highly acclaimed and led to a series of roles where he played alcoholics.

=== Box office ===
It made $3 million in its first year of release.

=== Critical ===
Filmink magazine later wrote that "For the most part, the handling of the movie is wrong, wrong, wrong; indeed, some of it is downright hideous...The treatment is too reverential when it needs to be a film about real, breathing people."

== Later version ==
A later film version of the novel, directed by James Goldstone, was made for American television as a two-part miniseries in 1984.

== See also ==
- List of American films of 1957
