= 19th Moscow International Film Festival =

Edition of film festival

- Location: Moscow, Russia
- Founded: 1959
- Awards: Grand Prix
- Festival date: 17–28 July 1995
- Website: Website

The 19th Moscow International Film Festival was held from 17 to 28 July 1995. The Golden St. George was not awarded.

== Jury ==
- Richard Gere (United States – President of the Jury)
- Friedrich Gorenstein (Germany)
- Aurelio De Laurentiis (Italy)
- Otar Iosseliani (Georgia)
- László Kovács (United States)
- Jiří Menzel (Czech Republic)
- David Robinson (Great Britain)
- Lidiya Fedoseyeva-Shukshina (Russia)
- Jerome Hellman (United States)
- Conrad Hall (United States)

== Films in competition ==
The following films were selected for the main competition:

English title	Original title	Director(s)	Production country
The Englishman Who Went Up a Hill But Came Down a Mountain	The Englishman Who Went Up a Hill But Came Down a Mountain	Christopher Monger	Great Britain
Up, Down, Fragile	Haut bas fragile	Jacques Rivette	France, Switzerland
State Secret	Segreto di stato	Giuseppe Ferrara	Italy
What a Wonderful Game	Kakaya chudnaya igra	Pyotr Todorovsky	Russia
Mario and the Magician	Mario und der Zauberer	Klaus Maria Brandauer	Germany, France, Austria
Marble Ass	Dupe od mramora	Želimir Žilnik	Yugoslavia
Reverted	Zawrócony	Kazimierz Kutz	Poland
Boys on the Side	Boys on the Side	Herbert Ross	United States
The Conqueror	Zhengfuzhe	Wenji Teng	China
A Last Note	Gogo no yuigonjo	Kaneto Shindo	Japan
Country Life	Country Life	Michael Blakemore	Australia
Hunter's Family	Semya okhotnika	Shapiga Musina	Kazakhstan
The Trace	Iz	Yeşim Ustaoğlu	Turkey
Condition Red	Condition Red	Mika Kaurismäki	Finland, United States, Germany, France
Thanks for Every New Morning	Díky za kazdé nové ráno	Milan Šteindler	Czech Republic
A Life for the Taking	Tag ditt liv	Göran du Rées	Sweden
Mee Pok Man	Mee Pok Man	Eric Khoo	Singapore
The Turkish Passion	La pasion turca	Vicente Aranda	Spain
The Wondrous Voyage of Kornel Esti	Esti Kornél csodálatos utazása	József Pacskovszky	Hungary
A French Woman	Une femme française	Régis Wargnier	France, Great Britain, Germany
Jaguar	Iagouaros	Katerina Evangelakou	Greece
Eggs	Eggs	Bent Hamer	Norway

== Awards ==
- Golden St. George: Not awarded
- Silver St. George for Directing:
  - Régis Wargnier for A French Woman
  - Milan Šteindler for Thanks for Every New Morning
- Special Silver St. George: Director of Photography Lajos Koltai for Mario and the Magician
- Silver St. George:
  - Best Actor: Gabriel Barylli for A French Woman
  - Best Actress: Emmanuelle Béart for A French Woman
- Prix of Ecumenical Jury: The Englishman Who Went Up a Hill But Came Down a Mountain by Christopher Monger
- Honorable Diplomas:
  - For the contribution to cinema: Sergei Bondarchuk
  - Tonino Guerra, screenwriter
  - Beata Tyszkiewicz, actress
