= Emmanuelle Béart =

French actress (born 1963)

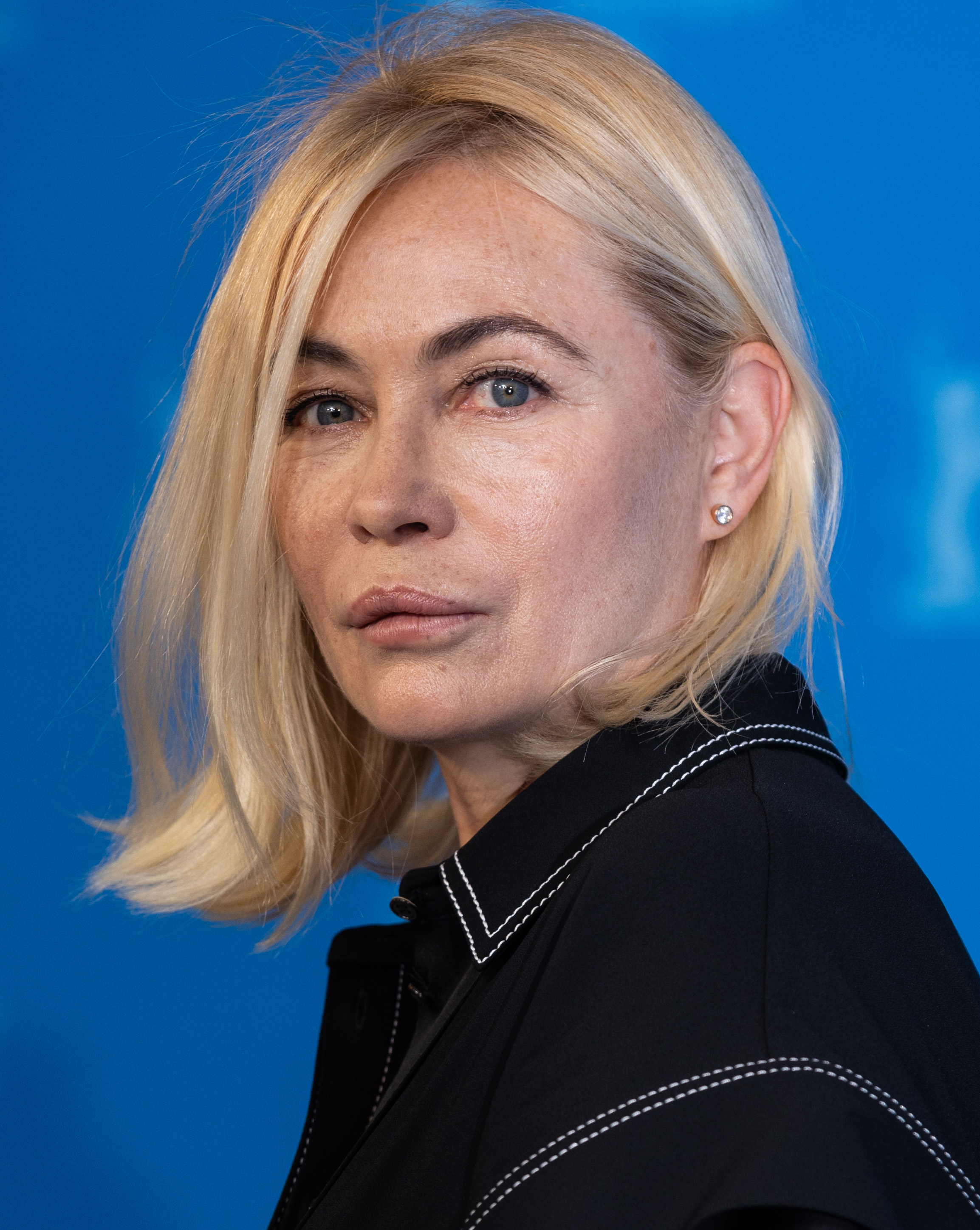
- Béart at the 72nd Berlin International Film Festival, 2022
- Born: 14 August 1963 (age 63); Gassin, France
- Occupation: Actress
- Years active: 1972–present
- Spouses: Daniel Auteuil (m. 1993; div. 1995); Michaël Cohen (m. 2008; sep. 2011)
- Children: 3
- Father: Guy Béart

Emmanuelle Béart (French: [ɛmɑ̃nɥɛl beaʁ]; born 14 August 1963) is a French actress who has appeared in over 60 film and television productions since 1972. An eight-time César Award nominee, she won the César Award for Best Supporting Actress for the 1986 film Manon des Sources. Her other notable film roles include La Belle Noiseuse (1991), A Heart In Winter (1992), Hell (1994), Mission: Impossible (1996) and 8 Women (2002).

== Early life ==
Emmanuelle Béart was born in Gassin, on the French Riviera, the daughter of Geneviève Galéa (pseudonym of Geneviève Guillery), a former model who is of Croatian, Greek and Maltese descent, and Guy Béart, a singer and poet.

She has a half-sister, Ève (born 1959), on her father's side and six half-siblings on her mother's side; Ivan, Sarah and Mikis Cerieix from her mother's relationship with Jean-Yves Cerieix and Olivier Guespin, Lison and Charlotte from her mother's relationship with Jean-Jacques Guespin.

In her late teens, she spent her summer vacation in Montreal with the English-speaking family of William Sofin, a close friend of her father. At the end of the summer, the family invited her to stay with them and complete her baccalauréat at Collège International Marie de France. They remained close friends.

== Career ==
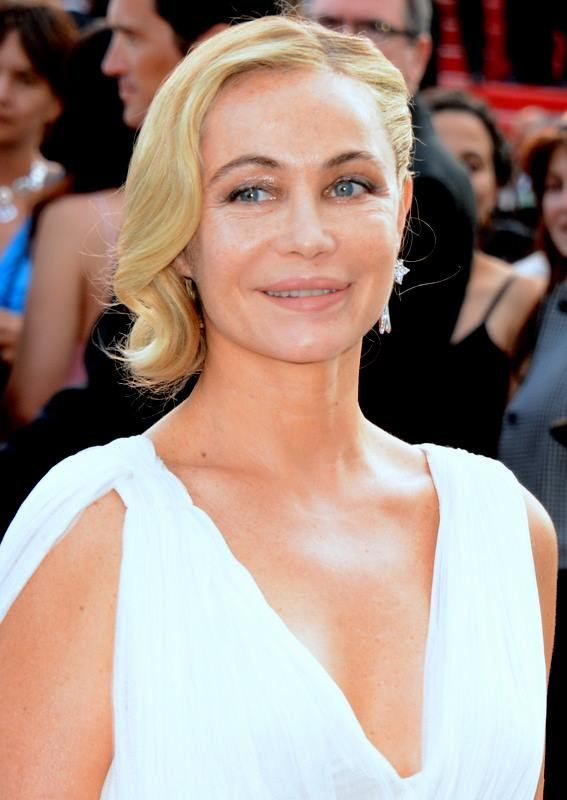
Béart at the 2015 Cannes Film Festival

Béart got an acting role in 1976 film Tomorrow's Children. In her teens she appeared in bit parts in television. Upon graduating from the Collège International Marie de France in Montreal, she returned to France to attend drama school in Paris. A short time later, she was cast in her first adult role in a film, and in 1986 she achieved fame with her role opposite Yves Montand, playing the avenging daughter in French hit Manon des Sources. For her performance, she won the 1987 César Award for Best Supporting Actress. In the 1987 film Date with an Angel, she starred as the Angel. In 1995, she won the Silver St. George award for Best Actress at the 19th Moscow International Film Festival for her starring role in film A French Woman.

In addition to her award for Best Supporting Actress, she has also been nominated for another seven César Awards for Most Promising Actress and Best Actress. Béart received Most Promising Actress nominations for A Strange Passion and Love on the Quiet; followed by Best Actress nominations for Children of Chaos, La Belle Noiseuse (The Beautiful Troublemaker), Un cœur en hiver (A Heart in Winter), Nelly et Monsieur Arnaud (Nelly and Mr Arnaud), and Les Destinées Sentimentales (Sentimental Destinies)

In the 5 May 2003 issue of the French edition of Elle magazine, Béart, aged 39, appeared nude: The entire run of 550,000 copies sold out in just three days, making it the biggest-selling issue in the fashion glossy's long history.

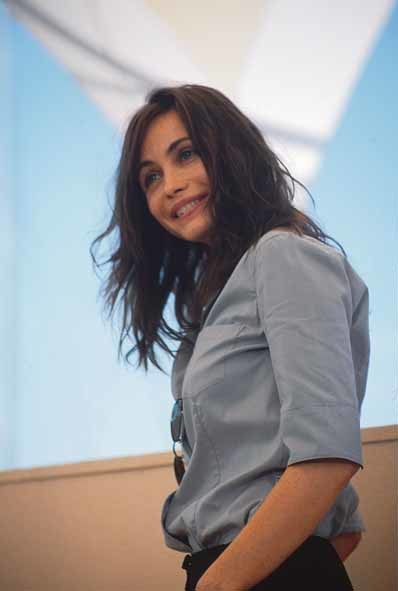
Béart at the 2000 Cannes Film Festival

== Personal life ==
In the mid-1980s, Béart began a relationship with Daniel Auteuil (her co-star in Love on the Quiet, Manon des Sources, A Heart in Winter and A French Woman). They married in 1993 and divorced in 1995. Béart was romantically linked to music producer David François Moreau (from c. 1995 after she separated from Auteuil) and to film producer Vincent Meyer for two years until his suicide in May 2003. She has three children, including Nelly Auteuil (born c. 1993) and Johan Moreau (born c. 1996). She married actor Michaël Cohen on 13 August 2008 at Genappe in Belgium, and in 2009 they adopted a child from Ethiopia, named Surafel. Béart and Cohen separated in 2011. In 2011, she began a romantic relationship with director and cinematographer Frédéric Chaudier.

In addition to her screen work, Béart is known for her social activism. She is an ambassador for UNICEF, and has made news for her opposition to France's anti-immigration legislation. In 1996, she made headlines when, defending the rights of the "sans-papiers" ("without papers", meaning irregular immigrants), she was removed after her group's occupation of a Parisian church.

In March 2012, Béart spoke out against plastic surgery in Le Monde, saying that she regretted having an operation on her lips in 1990 when she was 27.

In a 2023 documentary, she revealed that she was a victim of incest as a child but declined to reveal the identity of the abuser, only stating that it was not her father.

== Selected filmography ==
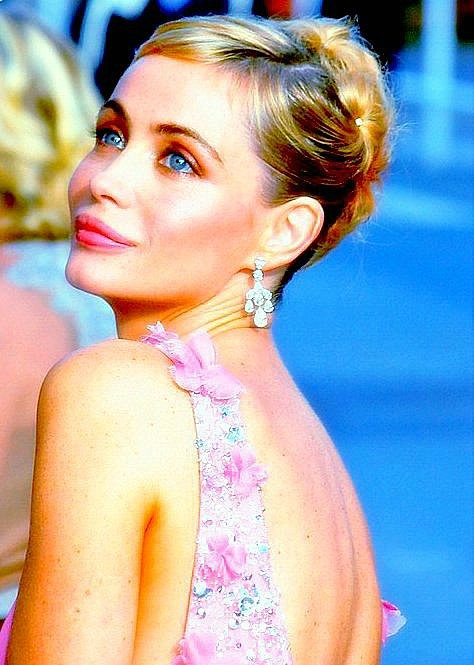
Béart in 2004

=== Film ===
Year	Title	Role	Director
1983	First Desires	Hélène	David Hamilton
1984	Un amour interdit	Constanza	Jean-Pierre Dougnac
1985	L'Amour en douce	Samantha	Édouard Molinaro
1986	Manon des Sources	Manon	Claude Berri
1987	Date with an Angel	Angel	Tom McLoughlin
1988	Door on the Left as You Leave the Elevator	Eva	Édouard Molinaro
1989	Les Enfants du désordre	Marie	Yannick Bellon
1990	Captain Fracassa's Journey	Isabella	Ettore Scola
1991	La Belle Noiseuse	Marianne	Jacques Rivette
1991	I Don't Kiss	Ingrid	André Téchiné
1992	A Heart in Winter	Camille	Claude Sautet
1994	Hell	Nelly	Claude Chabrol
1995	A French Woman	Jeanne	Régis Wargnier
1995	Nelly and Mr. Arnaud	Nelly	Claude Sautet
1996	Mission: Impossible	Claire Phelps	Brian de Palma
1998	Don Juan	Elvire	Jacques Weber
1998	Stolen Life	Alda	Yves Angelo
1999	Time Regained	Gilberte	Raoul Ruiz
1999	Season's Beatings	Sonia	Danièle Thompson
1999	Elephant Juice	Jules	Sam Miller
2000	Sentimental Destinies	Pauline Pommerel	Olivier Assayas
2001	Replay	Nathalie	Catherine Corsini
2002	8 Women	Louise	François Ozon
2002	Searching for Debra Winger	as herself	Rosanna Arquette
2003	Strayed	Odile	André Téchiné
2003	The Story of Marie and Julien	Marie Delambre	Jacques Rivette
2003	Nathalie...	Nathalie / Marlène	Anne Fontaine
2005	Hell	Sophie	Danis Tanović
2006	A Crime	Alice Parker	Manuel Pradal
2007	The Witnesses	Sarah	André Téchiné
2008	Disco	France Navarre	Fabien Onteniente
2008	Vinyan	Jeanne Bellmer	Fabrice Du Welz
2010	Nous Trois	Marie	Renaud Bertrand
2010	Ça commence par la fin	Gabrielle	Michaël Cohen
2011	Ma compagne de nuit	Julia	Isabelle Brocard
2012	Bye Bye Blondie	Frances	Virginie Despentes
2012	Télé gaucho	Patricia Gabriel	Michel Leclerc
2013	Par exemple, Électre	Chrysothémis	Jeanne Balibar, Pierre Léon
2014	My Mistress	Maggie/ The Mistress	Stephen Lance
2014	Les Yeux jaunes des crocodiles	Iris Dupin	Cécile Telerman
2017	Beyond the Known World	Louise	Pan Nalin
2019	Merveilles à Montfermeil	Emmanuelle Joly	Jeanne Balibar
2022	L'étreinte	Margaux Hartmann	Ludovic Bergery
2023	The Passengers of the Night	Vanda Dorval	Mikhaël Hers
2025	Stereo Girls	Michèle	Caroline Deruas

=== Television ===
- Le grand Poucet (1980)
- Zacharius (1984)
- Raison perdue (1984)
- La femme de sa vie (1986)
- Et demain viendra le jour (1986)
- Les jupons de la révolution (1 episode, 1989)
- D'Artagnan et les trois mousquetaires (2005)

== Awards and nominations ==
Year	Award	Work	Result
César Awards
1985	A Strange Passion	Most Promising Actress	Nominated
1986	Love on the Quiet	Most Promising Actress	Nominated
1987	Manon des Sources	Best Supporting Actress	Won
1990	Children of Chaos	Best Actress	Nominated
1992	La Belle Noiseuse	Best Actress	Nominated
1993	A Heart in Winter	Best Actress	Nominated
1996	Nelly and Mr. Arnaud	Best Actress	Nominated
2001	Sentimental Destinies	Best Actress	Nominated
Other awards
1993	A Heart in Winter	David di Donatello Award for Best Foreign Actress	Won
1995	A French Woman	Moscow International Film Festival Award for Best Actress	Won
2002	8 Women	European Film Award for Best Actress (shared)	Won
Honorary
2002	Silver Bear (Berlin) for Outstanding Artistic Contribution for 8 Women (shared)		Honored
2010	Stanislavsky Award (Moscow)		Honored
2012	Officer of the Order of Arts and Letters		Honored
2015	Chevalier of the Legion of Honour		Honored
