= The Sun Also Rises (1984 film) =

1984 American TV miniseries

- Screenplay by: Robert L. Joseph
- Directed by: James Goldstone
- Starring: Hart Bochner; Jane Seymour; Robert Carradine; Ian Charleson; Leonard Nimoy
- Music by: Billy Goldenberg
- Country of origin: United States
- Original language: English

Production
- Producers: Jean-Pierre Avice; John Furia; Robert L. Joseph
- Editors: Richard E. Rabjohn; Robert P. Seppey
- Running time: 200 minutes

Original release
- Network: NBC
- Release: December 9 – December 10, 1984

The Sun Also Rises is a 1984 television miniseries adaptation of Ernest Hemingway's 1926 novel The Sun Also Rises. Hart Bochner, Jane Seymour, Robert Carradine, Ian Charleson and Leonard Nimoy have starring roles. It aired on NBC on Sunday, December 9, and Monday, December 10, from 9–11 pm.

== Plot ==
American expatriates journalist Jake Barnes (Hart Bochner), war veteran Bill Gorton (Željko Ivanek), and novelist/boxer Robert Cohn (Robert Carradine), take advantage of the Paris night life. Barnes meets former paramour Lady Brett Ashley (Jane Seymour) who is about to divorce her husband to marry Scotsman Mike Campbell (Ian Charleson). Barnes' attraction to Ashley causes him to follow her movements and Gorton and Cohn follow as Cohn becomes enamored as well. Ashley expresses continuing interest in open relations. The group ventures to see bullfighting in Pamplona, Spain, where Ashley develops an appetite for matador Pedro Romero (Andrea Occhipinti). Cohn pummels Romero upon discovering her latest conquest although it does not impress Ashley. A bruised Romero enters the bullring as the curtains come down.

== Cast ==
- Hart Bochner as Jake Barnes
- Jane Seymour as Brett Ashley
- Robert Carradine as Robert Cohn
- Željko Ivanek as Bill Gorton
- Ian Charleson as Mike Campbell
- Leonard Nimoy as Count Mippipopolous
- Stéphane Audran as Georgette
- Andrea Occhipinti as Pedro Romero
- Élisabeth Bourgine as Nicole
- Hutton Cobb as Chaz
- Jennifer Hilary as Frances Clyne
- Arch Taylor as Lew Braddocks
- Renata Benedict as Eve Braddocks
- Julian Sands as Gerald

== Production ==
NBC had to acquire the production rights from 20th Century Fox, which produced the 1957 film adaptation. Like the source, the work is set in France and Spain. In an attempt to be true to the 1920s setting, some Pamplona scenes were shot in Segovia and some Paris scenes were shot in Versailles, because Paris and Pamplona did not look as they had 60 years earlier.

== Critical commentary ==
According to John J. O'Connor of The New York Times virtually all nuances that differed from the source were not well executed. People's Fred Hauptfuhrer notes that "Hemingway purists" may be offended by some of the changes. Arthur Unger of The Christian Science Monitor described this production as "a minor literary classic, which has now been turned into a major miniseries disaster". Stephen Farber of The New York Times recounts numerous elements depicted in the film that were not in the source material such as

A grieving Jake Barnes attends the funeral of a prostitute he had visited several times before being wounded and rendered impotent in World War I. Pedro Romero, the handsome young Spanish bull fighter, uses his sword to murder a vindictive count who has threatened the life of Lady Brett Ashley. Jake's best friend, Bill Gorton, takes an airplane, goes up on a daredevil flight and crashes to his death.

Screenwriter Robert L. Joseph defends the addition of mortally wounded characters as necessary for dramatic depiction. While the 1957 film starred a 43-year-old Tyrone Power and 34-year-old Ava Gardner, the 1984 adaptation starred a 27-year-old Bochner and 33-year-old Seymour, who the filmmakers thought could better depict the youthful characters of the source novel.

== Earlier version ==
An earlier film version of the novel, directed by Henry King, was released in theater by 20th Century Fox in 1957.
