= Christiane Minazzoli =

French actress (1931–2014)

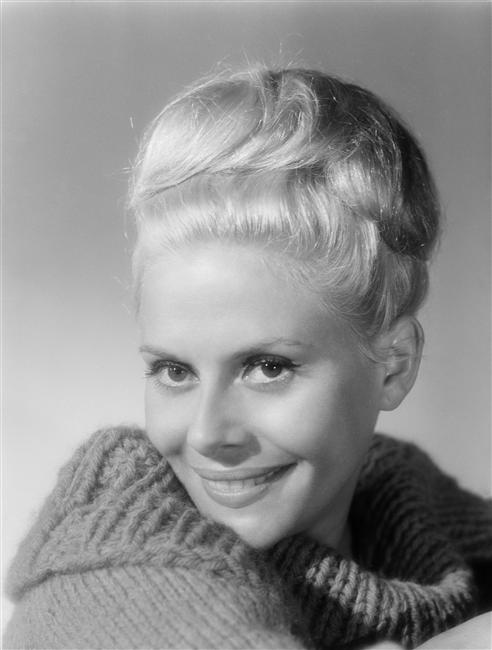
- Minazzoli in 1953
- Born: 11 July 1931; Saint-Ouen, France
- Died: 2 November 2014 (aged 83); Paris, France
- Occupation: Actress
- Years active: 1949–2001

Christiane Judith Yvette Minazzoli (11 July 1931 – 2 November 2014) was a French actress. She appeared in more than seventy films from 1949 to 1997.

== Selected filmography ==
| Year | Title | Role | Notes |
|---|---|---|---|
| 1994 | Hell | | |
| 1992 | Betty | | |
| 1991 | Madame Bovary | | |
| 1975 | Story of O | | |
| 1964 | Lucky Jo | | |
| 1969 | A Midsummer Night's Dream | | |
| 1969 | The Auvergnat and the Bus | | |
| 1966 | The Lost Woman | | |
| 1965 | Passeport diplomatique agent K 8 | | |
| 1964 | The Adventures of Salavin | | |
| 1964 | Hardi Pardaillan! | | |
| 1963 | Your Turn, Darling | | |
| 1955 | Thirteen at the Table | | |
| 1949 | Branquignol | | |
