= Querelles de famille =

1932 book by Georges Duhamel

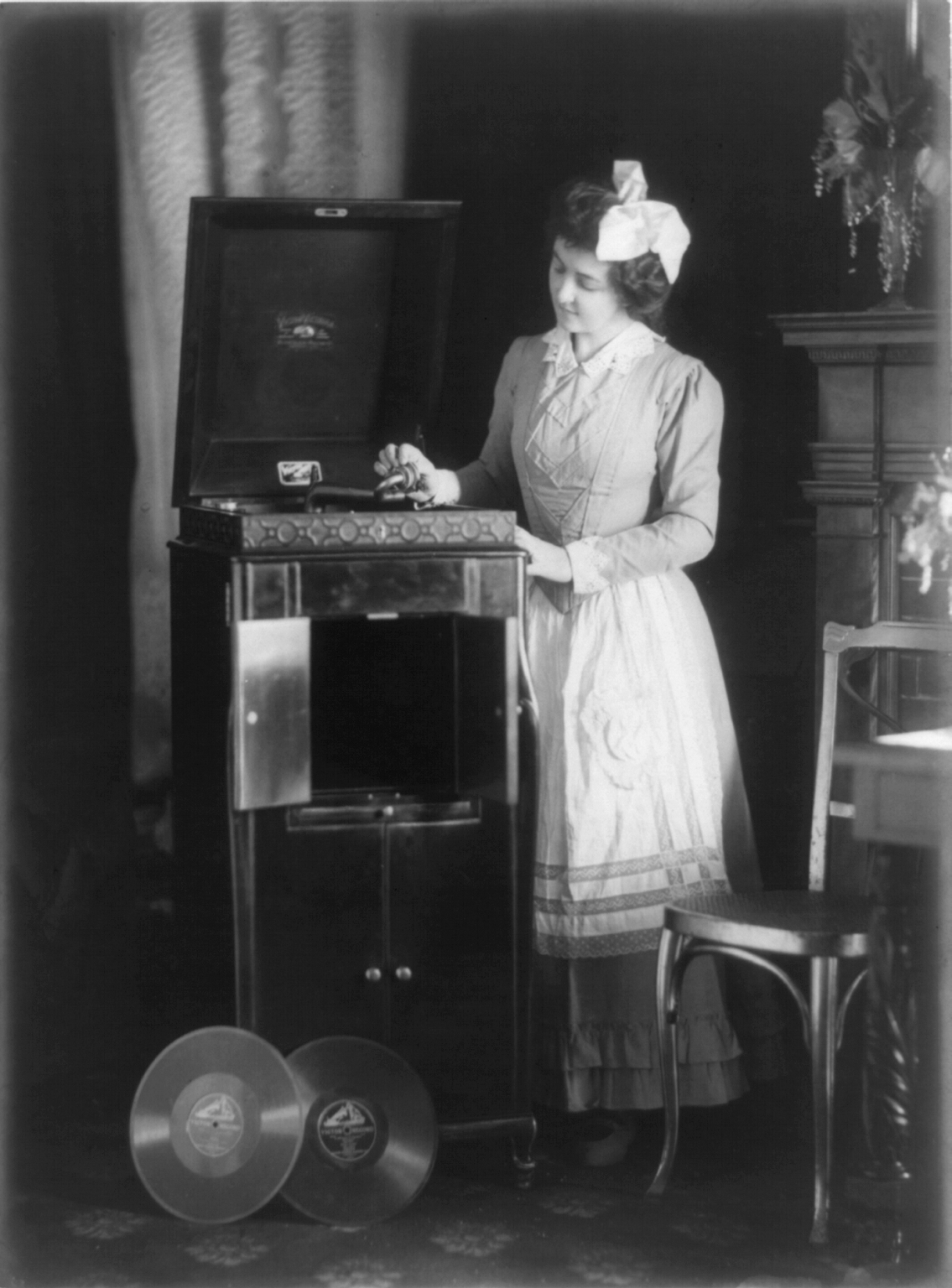
- The phonograph, which was becoming widespread in households is focused on in the novel.
- Author: Georges Duhamel
- Original title: Querelles de famille
- Publisher: Mercure de France
- Publication date: 1932
- Publication place: France
- Pages: 247

Querelles de famille (Family Quarrels) is a polemical book by Georges Duhamel published in 1932 by Mercure de France, dedicated to Roger Martin du Gard.

== Summary ==
Georges Duhamel, the narrator, in a caustic and purposefully ultra-conservative tone, criticises the technological progress of the close of the 19th century and the start of the 20th century, and the beginnings of consumer society. Its omnipresent and haunting sounds, in particular that of the phonograph, drive him to promote the creation of a national park of silence. The "grime" which, according to him, surrounds the cities, due essentially to what he calls the "société du fer blanc" (the tinplate society), is an annoyance to him. Inventors, who continue to create superficial objects, are called on to no longer submit new patents. The Church seems to Duhamel to be the next target of technological progress, and he fears the introduction of the phonograph into religious establishments for the purpose of playing chants and sacred music, and even, ultimately, replacing the sermons of the priest. Man in this society of uncontrolled technological progress loses his bearings, hungers for the latest invention and ends up hypochondriac on its behalf, waiting feverishly for its smallest malfunction and bringing it in at the slightest sign of failure. Through several people who become slaves to their appliances, moving from the electric pump to the car or the "téhésef", Duhamel vehemently attacks interwar French society using a backward-looking tone. Ultimately, he submits two measures to the President of the Republic, which according to him, would counter the consumerist trend in the population. In one, he proposes the creation of a Ministry of Advertising, charged with verifying the validity of corporate slogans in order to scientifically validate the "measurable and non-measurable" assertions which these corporations use to sell their products. In the other, he asks for the creation of a Ministry of Noise, charged with legislating schedules for the use of musical appliances and radios on beaches, with studying the impact of noise on health, with proposing industrial procedures for the neutralization of noise, and finally, his dream, with creating a national park of silence.

== Analysis ==
This book directly follows America, the Menace (Scènes de la vie future) which recounts his trip to the United States in the years 1929 and 1930 and the excesses of the consumer society that he discovered there.

== Editions ==
- Mercure de France, Paris, 1932 (reprinted in 1959).
