= Stéphane Audran =

French actress (1932–2018)

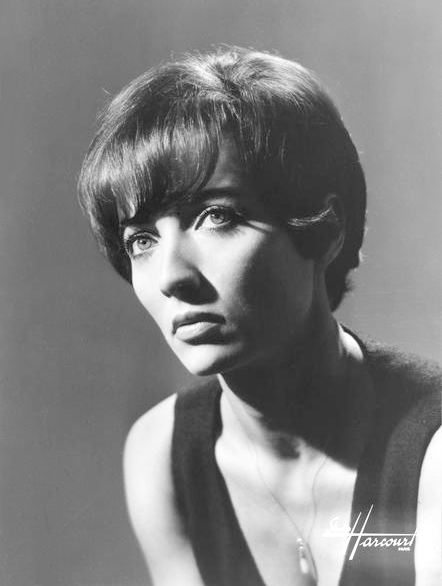
- Studio Harcourt portrait of Audran (1965).
- Born: Colette Suzanne Jeannine Dacheville; 8 November 1932; Versailles, Seine-et-Oise, France
- Died: 27 March 2018 (aged 85); Neuilly-sur-Seine, France
- Occupation: Actress
- Years active: 1955–2013
- Spouses: Jean-Louis Trintignant (m. 1954; div. 1956) Claude Chabrol (m. 1964; div. 1980)
- Children: Thomas Chabrol

Colette Suzanne Jeannine Dacheville (8 November 1932 – 27 March 2018), known by her stage name Stéphane Audran (French: [stefan odʁɑ̃]), was a French actress. With her languid voice and elegant bearing, she often portrayed haughty bourgeois woman. Considered an icon of French cinema, she was known for her performances in the films of her husband Claude Chabrol, including Les Biches (1968) and Le Boucher (1970), Luis Buñuel's The Discreet Charm of the Bourgeoisie (1972), and Gabriel Axel's Babette's Feast (1987).

Audran won the BAFTA Award for Best Actress in a Leading Role in 1974 (for Just Before Nightfall and The Discreet Charm of the Bourgeoisie). She also won the César Award for Best Supporting Actress (out of four total nominations) for Chabrol's Violette Nozière (1978).

== Early life and education ==
Audran was born Colette Suzanne Jeannine Dacheville in Versailles in 1932, and raised by her mother after her father, a doctor, died when she was six years old. A graduate of the Lycée Lamartine, she studied drama at the Ecole de théâtre Charles Dullin in Paris.

== Career ==
Audran first appeared on stage, though with little success, and gave her film debut in the 1957 short film Le jeu de la nuit. Her first collaboration with director Claude Chabrol was the 1959 Les Cousins, with whom she would make a total of 25 films. The two were married in 1964.

Audran's major films with Chabrol include Les Biches, which earned her the Silver Bear for Best Actress at the 18th Berlin International Film Festival, Le Boucher, Just Before Nightfall (1971), and Violette Nozière (1978), for which she won the César Award for Best Supporting Actress. She also starred in Eric Rohmer's 1959 debut film Le Signe du Lion (released in 1962), The Discreet Charm of the Bourgeoisie, for which she received the BAFTA Award for Best Actress in a Leading Role (together with Just Before Nightfall), Bertrand Tavernier's 1981 Coup de Torchon, and her internationally best known film, Babette's Feast. In addition, Audran had supporting roles in three films directed by Samuel Fuller. On TV, she appeared in productions like Brideshead Revisited (1981) and The Sun Also Rises (1984).

She remained active as a character actress until the late 2000s. Her last film released within her lifetime was The Girl from Monaco (2008).

== Honours ==
- Knight of the Legion of Honour (1986)
- Knight of the Order of the Dannebrog (1988)
- Officer of the National Order of Merit (1990)
- Commander Order of Arts and Letters (1997)

== Personal life ==
Having previously been married to actor Jean-Louis Trintignant, she married Chabrol in 1964. The couple had one son, actor Thomas Chabrol. Audran and Chabrol divorced in 1980, although she continued to appear in supporting roles in his films.

=== Death ===
She died on 27 March 2018, aged 85, following a long illness. Her son Thomas reported that his mother had been in hospital for 10 days before she returned home, where she died. Her final film, Orson Welles' long-unfinished The Other Side of the Wind (filmed between 1970–1976), premiered five months after her death.

== Stage appearances ==
Year	Title	Role	Venue
1951	Lysistrata		Comédie de Paris, Paris
1952	Urbain Grandier		Théâtre de l'Œuvre, Paris
1954	La Maison carrée		Théâtre des Noctambules, Paris
1955	Les Albigeois		Festival de Nîmes
1955	La Fille à la fontaine		Festival de Nîmes
1955	Julius Caesar		Festival de Nîmes
1956	La Nuit romaine		Théâtre Hébertot
1964	Macbeth	Lady Macbeth	Théâtre Montansier, Versailles

== Filmography ==
=== Film ===
Year	Title	Role	Notes
1957	Le jeu de la nuit		Short film
1958	La bonne tisane	Aline Monnier	
1958	Montparnasse 19	Girl on the terrace	Uncredited
1959	Les Cousins	Françoise	
1960	Les Bonnes Femmes	Ginette	
1960	Présentation ou Charlotte et son steak	Charlotte	Short film
1961	Wise Guys	Xavière	
1961	Saint Tropez Blues	Lucie	Short film
1962	Le Signe du lion	Landlady	
1962	The Third Lover	Hélène	
1963	Landru	Fernande Segret	
1964	Les Durs à cuire ou Comment supprimer son prochain sans perdre l'appétit	Rika Lormond	
1964	Le Tigre aime la chair fraîche	Opera singer	Uncredited
1965	Six in Paris	Mother	Segment "La Muette"
1965	Marie-Chantal contre le docteur Kha	Olga	
1966	Line of Demarcation	Wife of Dr. Lafaye	
1967	The Champagne Murders	Jacqueline Belling / Lydia	
1968	Les Biches	Frédérique	
1969	The Unfaithful Wife	Hélène Desvallées	
1970	Le Boucher	Hélène	
1970	Children of Mata Hari	Dominique Krestowitz	
1970	The Breach	Hélène Régnier	
1970	The Lady in the Car with Glasses and a Gun	Anita Caldwell	
1971	Just Before Nightfall	Hélène Masson	
1971	Sans mobile apparent	Hélène Vallée	
1971	Aussi loin que l'amour	Michel's wife	
1972	Un meurtre est un meurtre	Marie Kastner / Anne	
1972	The Discreet Charm of the Bourgeoisie	Alice Sénéchal	
1973	Wedding in Blood	Lucienne Delamare	
1974	Comment réussir quand on est con et pleurnichard	Cécile Malempin	
1974	Le Cri du cœur	Claire, Alexandre's mother	
1974	And Then There Were None	Ilona Morgan	
1974	Vincent, François, Paul and the Others	Catherine, Vincent's wife	
1975	Hay que matar a B.	Susana	
1975	The Black Bird	Anna Kemidov	
1976	Chi dice donna, dice donna	Mimì / Chantal	Segment "Donne d'affari"
1976	The Twist	Claire Brandels	
1977	Silver Bears	Shireen Firdausi	
1977	The Devil's Advocate	Contessa Anna di Sanctis	
1977	Mort d'un pourri	Christiane	
1978	Blood Relatives	Mrs. Lowery	
1978	Violette Nozière	Germaine Nozière	
1979	Eagle's Wing	Widow	
1979	Le Gagnant	Hélène Dupré-Granval	
1980	Le Soleil en face	Geneviève	
1980	The Big Red One	Belgian Resistance Fighter	
1980	Le Cœur à l'envers	Jeanne	
1981	The Plouffe Family	Mme Boucher	
1981	Coup de torchon	Huguette Cordier	
1982	Boulevard des assassins	Francine	
1982	Le Choc	Jeanne Faulques	Uncredited
1982	Paradis pour tous	Edith	
1983	Deadly Circuit	Grey lady	
1983	La Scarlatine	Minon Palazzi	
1984	Thieves After Dark	Isabelle's mother	
1984	The Blood of Others	Gigi	
1984	The Bay Boy	Blanche	Uncredited
1985	Cop au Vin	Madame Cuno	
1985	Night Magic	Janice	
1985	La Cage aux Folles 3: The Wedding	Matrimonia	
1986	La Gitane	Brigitte	
1986	Suivez mon regard	Wife of TV addict	
1987	Faceless	Madame Sherman	
1987	The Cry of the Owl	Françoise Tessier	
1987	Babette's Feast	Babette Hersant	
1987	Cinématon #926		Short film
1988	Les Saisons du plaisir	Bernadette	
1988	Corps z'a corps	Edna Chabert	
1988	Il Nido del ragno	Mrs. Kuhn	
1989	Manika, une vie plus tard	Sister Ananda	
1990	La Messe en si mineur	Marie-Laure Villegrain	
1990	Quiet Days in Clichy	Adrienne	
1990	Sons	Florence	
1992	Betty	Laure	
1992	The Turn of the Screw	Mrs. Grose	
1995	Le Fils de Gascogne	Herself	
1995	Au petit Marguery	Joséphine	
1996	Maximum Risk	Chantal Moreau	
1997	Arlette	Diane	
1998	Madeline	Lady Covington	
1999	Belle maman	Brigitte	
2000	Le Pique-nique de Lulu Kreutz	Lulu Kreutz	
2001	J'ai faim !!!	Gaby	
2002	Ma femme s'appelle Maurice	Jacqueline Boisdain	
2008	The Girl from Monaco	Édith Lassalle	
2018	The Other Side of the Wind	Herself	Posthumous release; filmed 1970–76

=== Television ===
Year	Title	Role	Notes
1973	Tatort	Dr. Bogdanovich	Episode "Dead Pigeon on Beethoven Street"
1979	Orient-Express	Baroness Maria von Pallberg	Miniseries
1981	Cinéma 16	Marianne Bernejoul	Episode "Le Marteau piqueur"
1981	Le Beau monde	Ariane	TV movie
1981	Brideshead Revisited	Cara	Miniseries
1982	Elective Affinities	Charlotte	TV movie
1982	La Marseillaise	Juliette Poussin	TV movie
1984	Mistral's Daughter	Paula Deslandes	Miniseries
1984	The Sun Also Rises	Georgette	Miniseries
1986	Un'isola	Signora Lecoq	Miniseries
1987	Sentiments		Episode "David e David"
1987	Poor Little Rich Girl: The Barbara Hutton Story	Pauline de la Rochelle	TV movie
1988	Les Dossiers de l'inspecteur Lavardin	Catherine	Episode "L'escargot noir"
1989	Champagne Charlie	Thérèse	TV movie
1990	TECX	Isabelle Souverain	9 episodes
1992	Weep No More, My Lady	Minna	TV movie
1992	Les mercredis de la vie	Dephine Valois	Episode "Le Droit à l'oubli"
1994	L'Évanouie	Claire	TV movie
1995	Un siècle d'écrivains	Narrator (voice)	Documentary, episode "Karen Blixen"
1996	Petit	Françoise	TV movie
1997	Un printemps de chien	Geneviève	TV movie
2000	La Bicyclette bleue	Lisa Montpleynet	Miniseries
2004	Sissi, l'impératrice rebelle	Archduchess Sophie	TV movie
2005	Trois femmes… un soir d'été	Louise Bonnier	Miniseries
2005	La Battante	Edwige Fournier	Miniseries

== Awards and nominations ==
Institution	Year	Category	Work	Result	Ref.
Berlin International Film Festival	1968	Best Actress	Les Biches	Won	
British Academy Film Awards	1973	Best Actress in a Leading Role	Le Boucher	Nominated	
British Academy Film Awards	1974	Best Actress in a Leading Role	Just Before Nightfall; The Discreet Charm of the Bourgeoisie	Won	
British Academy Film Awards	1989	Best Actress in a Leading Role	Babette's Feast	Nominated	
César Awards	1979	Best Supporting Actress	Violette Nozière	Won	
César Awards	1982	Best Supporting Actress	Coup de Torchon	Nominated	
César Awards	1983	Best Supporting Actress	Paradis pour tous	Nominated	
César Awards	1984	Best Supporting Actress	Deadly Circuit	Nominated	
London Film Critics' Circle	1989	Actor of the Year	Babette's Feast	Won	
Nastro d'Argento	1988	Best Foreign Actress	Babette's Feast	Won	
Robert Awards	1988	Best Actress in a Leading Role	Babette's Feast	Won	
San Sebastián International Film Festival	1970	Best Actress	Le Boucher	Won	
