= A Strange Passion =

- Theatrical release poster
- Directed by: Jean-Pierre Dougnac
- Screenplay by: Jean-Pierre Dougnac
- Based on: "The Foundling" by Heinrich von Kleist
- Produced by: François Nocher; Dominique Vignet
- Cinematography: Romano Albani
- Edited by: Marie-Josée Audiard
- Music by: Luis Bacalov
- Distributed by: Promo International
- Release date: 21 November 1984
- Running time: 95 minutes
- Country: France
- Language: French

A Strange Passion (French: Un amour interdit) is a 1984 French drama film directed by Jean-Pierre Dougnac, starring Brigitte Fossey, Fernando Rey and Saverio Marconi. The story is set in Italy in the late 18th century. It is based on the short story "The Foundling" by Heinrich von Kleist.

Emmanuelle Béart was nominated for Most Promising Actress at the 10th César Awards.

== Cast ==
- Brigitte Fossey as Elvire
- Fernando Rey as Piacchi
- Saverio Marconi as Nicolo and Colino
- Agostina Belli as Zaveria
- Emmanuelle Béart as Constanza
- Roger Planchon as the bishop
- Remo Remotti as Peppo
- Miranda Martino as Elvire's mother
- Margherita Sala as Antonia
- Salvatore Napolitano as Nicolo as a child
- Alexis Cabot as Paolo
- Michaela Sciurpa as Clara
- Guido Alberti as Valerio, Piacchi's friend
- Daniele Dublino as the father superior
- Pietro Rosella as the coachman
