= Messieurs Ludovic =

1946 film

- Directed by: Jean-Paul Le Chanois
- Written by: Jean-Paul Le Chanois
- Based on: Ludo by Pierre Scize
- Produced by: Marcel Bryau; Emil Flavin
- Starring: Odette Joyeux; Bernard Blier; Marcel Herrand
- Cinematography: Jacques Lemare
- Edited by: Emma Le Chanois
- Music by: Joseph Kosma
- Production company: Optimax Films
- Distributed by: Les Films Roger Richebé
- Release date: 3 May 1946
- Running time: 105 minutes
- Country: France
- Language: French

Messieurs Ludovic is a 1946 French comedy drama film directed by Jean-Paul Le Chanois and starring Odette Joyeux, Bernard Blier and Marcel Herrand. It is based on the 1932 play Ludo by Pierre Scize. The film's sets were designed by the art directors Paul Bertrand and Auguste Capelier.

== Cast ==
- Odette Joyeux as Anne-Marie Vermeulen
- Bernard Blier as Ludovic Seguin
- Marcel Herrand as Ludovic Le Chartier
- Jean Chevrier as Ludovic Mareuil
- Jules Berry as Monsieur Mareuil
- Julien Carette as Julien
- Pierre Palau as Ernest, le domestique
- Etienne Decroux as Le guide
- Mona Dol as Mme Vermeulen
- Jean Gobet as Benoît Decour
- Georgette Tissier as Georgette
- Gabrielle Fontan as La concierge des Thibaut
- Yasmine Cayret as Mme Seguin
- Sabine Angély as Mme Benoist
- Arlette Merry as Marika Lamar

== Bibliography ==
- Bessy, Maurice & Chirat, Raymond. Histoire du cinéma français: encyclopédie des films, 1940–1950. Pygmalion, 1986
- Rège, Philippe. Encyclopedia of French Film Directors, Volume 1. Scarecrow Press, 2009.
