= Thomas Chabrol =

French actor (born 1963)

- Born: 24 April 1963 (age 63); Paris, France
- Occupations: Actor, director, screenwriter
- Years active: 1974–present
- Parents: Claude Chabrol; Stéphane Audran

Thomas Chabrol (born 24 April 1963) is a French actor, director, and screenwriter. He is the son of director Claude Chabrol and actress Stéphane Audran.

== Filmography ==
Year	Title	Role	Director	Notes
1974	La bonne nouvelle	Jérôme	André Weinfeld	Short
1977	Alice or the Last Escapade	The 13 years old	Claude Chabrol	
1980	Les turlupins	Didier	Bernard Revon	
1988	Story of Women	The waiter	Claude Chabrol (2)	
1988	Les dossiers secrets de l'inspecteur Lavardin	The receptionist	Claude Chabrol (3)	TV series (1 episode)
1989	Un été d'orages	A Young Militiaman	Charlotte Brandström	
1989	Les dossiers secrets de l'inspecteur Lavardin	Jean-Alain Page	Claude Chabrol (4)	TV series (1 episode)
1990	Quiet Days in Clichy	A guest	Claude Chabrol (5)	
1990	V comme vengeance	Stéphane	Charles L. Bitsch	TV series (1 episode)
1991	La milliardaire		Jacques Ertaud	TV movie
1991	Madame Bovary	The Viscount	Claude Chabrol (6)	
1992	Betty	Schwartz	Claude Chabrol (7)	
1992	C'est mon histoire	Soulier	Bernard Choquet	TV series (1 episode)
1993	Catherine Courage	Lanquetin	Jacques Ertaud (2)	TV movie
1994	L'Enfer	Julien	Claude Chabrol (8)	
1994	Un jour avant l'aube	Descorbières	Jacques Ertaud (3)	TV movie
1994	L'évanouie	Claire's son	Jacqueline Veuve	TV movie
1994	Se pendre à son cou		Jean-Luc Gaget	Short
1995	Au petit Marguery	Thomas	Laurent Bénégui	
1995	Ada sait pas dire non	man asking the time	Luc Pagès	Short
1996	Cubic		Thomas Chabrol	TV series
1996	Tendre piège	Frédéric	Serge Moati	TV movie
1996	Les faux médicaments	Doc Martens	Alain-Michel Blanc	TV movie
1996	L'oeil qui traîne	The hiring manager	Stéphane Brizé	Short
1997	Un printemps de chien	Julien	Alain Tasma	TV movie
1997	Ni vue ni connue	Jacques Fortier	Pierre Lary	TV movie
1997	Rien que des grandes personnes		Jean-Marc Brondolo	Short
1997	Liberté chérie		Jean-Luc Gaget (2)	Short
1997	Mauvais genre	Paul Ribois	Laurent Bénégui (2)	
1997	The Swindle	Swiss Desk Clerk	Claude Chabrol (9)	
1997	Il y a des journées qui mériteraient qu'on leur casse la gueule		Alain Beigel	Short
1998	Divorce sans merci	Jean-Louis	Thomas Vincent	TV movie
1998	Vertiges	Fournier	Eric Woreth	TV series (1 episode)
1998	Anne Le Guen	The doctor	Stéphane Kurc	TV series (1 episode)
1998	Le temps d'un éclair	Markus	Marco Pauly	TV movie
1999	Singerie	Valentin Cronu	Claire Aziza	Short
1999	Le bahut	The psy	Arnaud Sélignac	TV series (1 episode)
1999	The Color of Lies	The medical examiner	Claude Chabrol (10)	
1999	Le bleu des villes	The dredger	Stéphane Brizé (2)	
1999	Our Happy Lives	Lawyer Carteret	Jacques Maillot	
1999	Le gang des TV		Artus de Penguern	Short
2000	La caracole		Marco Pauly (2)	TV movie
2000	Alice Nevers: Le juge est une femme	Francis Arnault	Pierre Boutron	TV series (1 episode)
2000	Julie Lescaut	Stern	Pascale Dallet	TV series (1 episode)
2001	Gregoire Moulin vs. Humanity	Rodolphe	Artus de Penguern (2)	
2001	H	The sales representative	Marco Pauly (3)	TV series (1 episode)
2001	Barnie et ses petites contrariétés	Orient-Express steward	Bruno Chiche	
2001	Les petits oiseaux	Roch	Fred Louf	Short
2001	L'assurance est un plat qui se mange froid		Daniel Jenny	Short
2002	Un homme en colère	Judge Exteberri	Marc Angelo	TV series (1 episode)
2002	Nestor Burma	Benjamin Fichet	Jacob Berger	TV series (1 episode)
2002	Le nouveau Jean-Claude	Jean-Michel	Didier Tronchet	
2003	The Flower of Evil	Matthieu Lartigue	Claude Chabrol (11)	
2003	Elle est des nôtres	Director Promocash	Siegrid Alnoy	
2003	Avocats & associés	Joël Ferry	Philippe Triboit	TV series (1 episode)
2004	Sex and the City	Andre	Timothy Van Patten	TV series (1 episode)
2004	The Bridesmaid	Lieutenant José Laval	Claude Chabrol (12)	
2005	Les couilles de mon chat	The veterinarian	Didier Bénureau	Short
2005	Alex Santana, négociateur	Philippe Bordier	Denis Amar	TV series (1 episode)
2005	La Boîte noire	Thierry	Richard Berry	
2005	On ne prête qu'aux riches	Lambrecht	Arnaud Sélignac (2)	TV movie
2002–06	La crim	Bruno Salinas	Several	TV series (34 episodes)
2006	Comedy of Power	Félix	Claude Chabrol (13)	
2006	Hell	The auctioneer	Bruno Chiche (2)	
2006	Qui m'aime me suive	Jean-Jacques	Benoît Cohen	
2006	Jeff et Léo, flics et jumeaux	Victor Kubelic	Olivier Guignard	TV series (1 episode)
2006	L'oncle de Russie	The notary	Francis Girod	TV movie
2007	Ondes de choc	Gérard Pernelle	Laurent Carcélès	TV mini-series (1 episode)
2007	Décroche		Manuel Schapira	Short
2007	Un juge sous influence	Jacques	Jean Marboeuf	TV movie
2007	A Girl Cut in Two	Lawyer Stéphane Lorbach	Claude Chabrol (14)	
2007	Nos enfants chéris – la série	Evrard	Benoît Cohen (2)	TV series
2007	Un admirateur secret	Commander Chéreau	Christian Bonnet	TV movie
2007	Chez Maupassant	Charles Loisel	Claude Chabrol (15)	TV series (1 episode)
2008	Boulevard du Palais	Étienne Mageard	Christian Bonnet (2)	TV series (1 episode)
2008	De sang et d'encre	Barthélémy Lesage	Charlotte Brandström (2)	TV movie
2009	Bellamy	guy in court	Claude Chabrol (16)	
2009	Au siècle de Maupassant: Contes et nouvelles du XIXème siècle	Monsieur Delacelle	Olivier Schatzky	TV series (1 episode)
2009	Douce France	José	Stéphane Giusti	TV movie
2010	Section de recherches	Nicolas Saint Vépan	Denis Amar (2)	TV series (1 episode)
2010	La République	François Darcy	Nicolas Pariser	Short
2010	La loi selon Bartoli	Lawyer Nalbandian	Laurence Katrian	TV series (1 episode)
2010	Vital désir	Patrick	Jérôme Boivin	TV movie
2010	La maison des Rocheville	Joseph de Rocheville	Jacques Otmezguine	TV mini-series (3 episodes)
2011	L'imprésario	François Forestier	Serge Bozon	Short
2011	Bienvenue à Bouchon	The minister	Luc Béraud	TV movie
2011	18 Years Old and Rising	The Math Professor	Fred Louf (2)	
2011	Mission sacrée	Chambon	Daniel Vigne	TV movie
2011	Les affaires sont les affaires	Gabriel Le Dauphin	Philippe Bérenger	TV movie
2011	Chez Maupassant	The justice's judge	Philippe Bérenger (2)	TV series (1 episode)
2012	Le grand Georges	Léon Rouvais	François Marthouret	TV movie
2012	Haute Cuisine	The prefect of the Chief	Christian Vincent	
2012	Hitch	Voice	Sébastien Grall	
2012	L'autre sang	Professor Fleischer	Francois Tchernia, François Vacarisas	Short
2013	La croisière	Charles Dampierre	Pascal Lahmani	TV series (1 episode)
2013	The French Minister	Sylvain Marquet	Bertrand Tavernier	
2014	Lili Rose	Pierrot	Bruno Ballouard	
2013–15	Nicolas Le Floch	Le Noir	Philippe Bérenger (3)	TV series (3 episodes)
2015	The Great Game	Senator Darcy	Nicolas Pariser (2)	

== On stage ==
Year	Title	Author	Director
1989	La nuit est un diable	Prosper Mérimée	Pascale Liévyn
1991	Servant of Two Masters	Carlo Goldoni	Michel Galabru
2005	Meurtre	Hanokh Levin	Clément Poirée
2008	Le Plan B	Alexander Payne	Michel Fagadau
2013	Le Voyageur sans bagage	Jean Anouilh	Alain Fromager, Gwendoline Hamon
