= Welcome in Vienna =

1986 film

- Directed by: Axel Corti
- Written by: Axel Corti; Georg Stefan Troller
- Starring: Gabriel Barylli
- Release date: 9 March 1986 (West Germany)
- Running time: 127 minutes
- Country: Austria
- Language: German

Welcome in Vienna (German: Wohin und zurück - Teil 3: Welcome in Vienna) is a 1986 Austrian drama film directed by Axel Corti. The film was selected as the Austrian entry for the Best Foreign Language Film at the 60th Academy Awards, but was not accepted as a nominee.

It is the third film in the director's six-hour, "Where To and Back" (Wohin und zurück) trilogy. It follows on from the first film, 1982's Wohin und zurück - God Does Not Believe In Us Anymore (German: Wohin und zurück - Teil 1: An uns glaubt Gott nicht mehr - Ferry oder Wie es war), and the second film, 1986's Wohin und zurück - Santa Fe (German: Wohin und zurück - Teil 2: Santa Fé).

"...The trilogy is loosely based on [writer] Troller’s life as a Viennese Jew who fled Europe as a teenager, emigrated to the United States, and returned to Europe during World War II as an American soldier. Each of these full length feature films – which are connected to each other by an advancing chronology and a series of overlapping characters – are meant to be viewed together...".

== Cast ==
- Gabriel Barylli as Freddy Wolf
- Nicolas Brieger as Sgt. Adler
- Claudia Messner as Claudia
- Karlheinz Hackl as Treschensky
- Joachim Kemmer as Lt. Binder
- Hubert Mann as Capt. Karpeles
- Liliana Nelska as Russian woman
- Kurt Sowinetz as Stodola

== See also ==
- List of submissions to the 60th Academy Awards for Best Foreign Language Film
- List of Austrian submissions for the Academy Award for Best Foreign Language Film
