= Gabriel Barylli =

Austrian actor

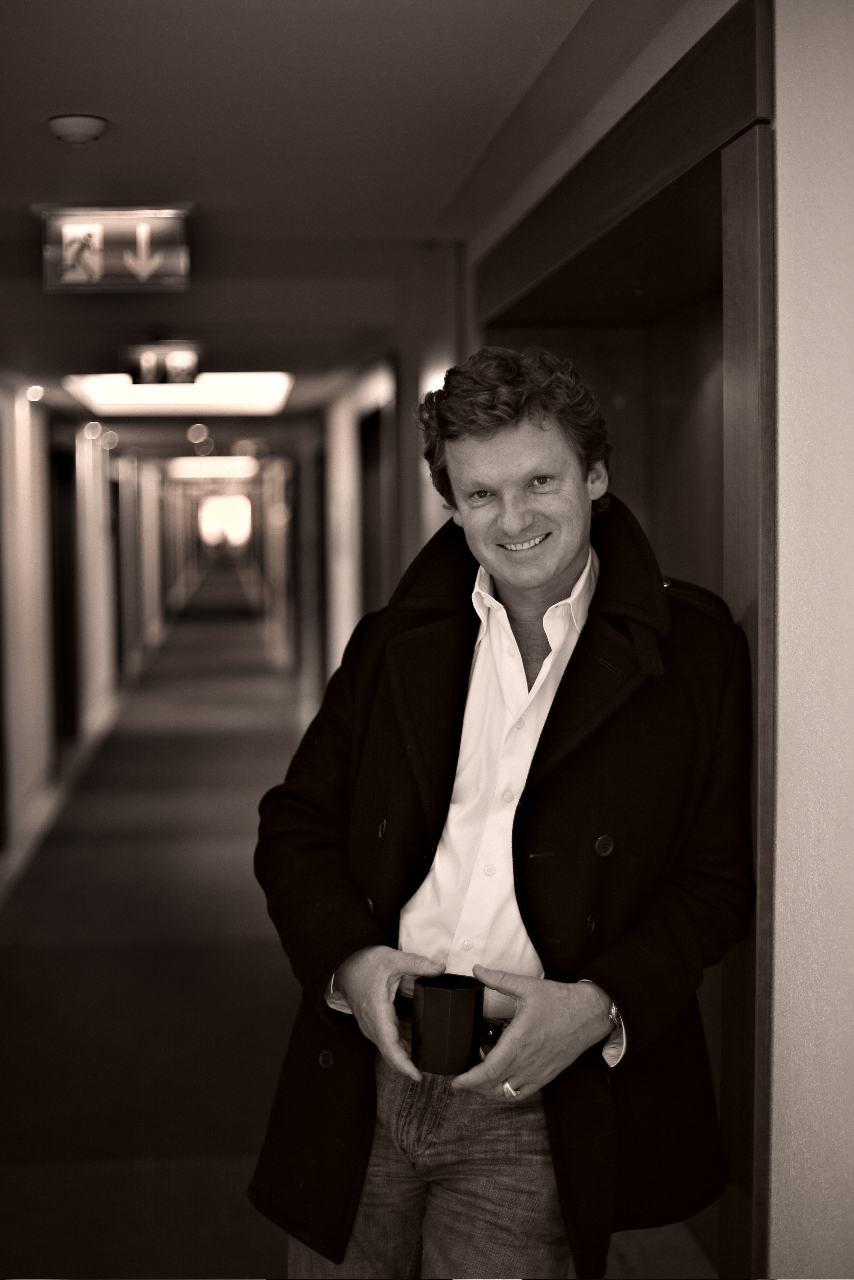
- Gabriel Barylli in 2008
- Born: 31 May 1957 (age 68); Vienna, Austria
- Occupations: Actor; Film director
- Years active: 1981–present

Gabriel Barylli (born 31 May 1957) is an Austrian actor and film director. He has appeared in more than 40 films and television shows since 1981. He won the Silver St. George award for Best Actor for his role in A French Woman at the 19th Moscow International Film Festival.

== Selected filmography ==
As actor

- Student Gerber (1981), as Kurt Gerber
- Eine blassblaue Frauenschrift (1984, TV film), as Leonidas Tachezy
- The Woman Without a Body and the Projectionist (1984), as Michael Blank
- Wohin und zurück 2 – Santa Fe (1986, TV film), as Freddy Wolff
- Wohin und zurück 3 – Welcome in Vienna (1986, TV film), as Freddy Wolff
- Mit meinen heißen Tränen (1986, TV film), as Moritz von Schwind
- Franza (1986, TV film), as Martin
- Storms in May (1987, TV film), as Leopold Holzner
- The Distant Land (1987), as Otto
- Bread and Butter (1990), as Martin
- A French Woman (1995), as Mathias Behrens
- Honigmond (1996), as Taxi driver
- Krambambuli (1998, TV film), as Georg Walch

As director

- Bread and Butter (1990)
- Honigmond (1996)
- On the Wings of Love (1999)
