= Cécile Debray =

French museum director, art historian and curator (born 1966)

Cécile Debray (born November 20, 1966) is a French museum director, art historian and curator, specializing in modern and contemporary art in painting. She is general heritage curator, director of the Musée de l'Orangerie since 2017. She has been awarded the medal of Officier des Arts et des Lettres by France in 2018.

== Biography ==
Debray studied art history before entering the Institut national du patrimoine in 1996. She is the great-granddaughter of the academician writer Georges Duhamel and represents his heirs. She studied art history and history at Paris Nanterre University, at the École des Hautes Études en Sciences Sociales and at the University of Montreal, then, in 1996, joined the Institut national du patrimoine.

=== Professional career ===
Director of the museums of Châteauroux, from 1997 to 2000, she was curator at the Museum of Modern Art of Paris from 2000 to 2005, scientific advisor to the General Administrator of the Réunion des Musées Nationaux and the Grand Palais des Champs -Élysées, in charge of the programming of the National Galleries of the Grand Palais, from 2005 to 2008.

From 2008 to 2017, Cécile Debray was chief curator in charge of modern collections at the National Museum of Modern Art-Centre Pompidou.

In 2009 she was co-curator with Camille Morineau of Elles@centrepompidou a female artists' exhibition, for which she was in charge of the travelling exhibition through the United States and Brazil with a selection of artworks focused on the American and Brazilian scenes.

A specialist in Henri Matisse, in 2012, she revealed the conceptual dimension of Matisse's work through the exhibition Matisse, Pairs and series highlighting the repetitive exploration of the same subject, of the same motif, which allowed the artist to explore painting.

In 2015, she designed the Marcel Duchamp monographic exhibition La peinture même. Cécile Debray shows the painting and the drawings which led the artist to the realization of the Grand Verre, La mariée mise à nu par ses célibataires, même, from 1910 to 1923. A new approach, the exhibition intends to show the paintings of the one who, according to the modernist doxa, wanted to kill painting.

In 2017, she succeeded Laurence des Cars as director of the Musée de l'Orangerie. She rethinks the presentation of the collections which has been accompanied by a renovation and redesign of spaces, and sets up "Contemporary Counterpoints", with artists such as Otobong Nkanga, Richard Jackson and Ann Veronica Janssens.

Cécile Debray is promoting in France in 2020 the work of the Portuguese artist Paula Rego, the only woman in the School of London, a figure of the movement against violence towards women and the ambivalence of childhood, which she exhibits at the museum of the Orangery. Invited by Jean de Loisy to the programme "L'art est la matière" (Art is matter) on France Culture, she says:

The Orangery is a setting that allows a unique enhancement of the works. Thus, Paula Rego's pastels unfold in all their sensuality, between a very raw realism and a Hispanic baroque.

In 2021, Cécile Debray is continuing her programme of historical exhibitions at the Musée de l'Orangerie with Soutine / de Kooning: La peinture incarnee (The Incarnate Painting), from September 14, 2021, to January 10, 2022, and David Hockney: The four seasons, from October 12, 2021, to February 10, 2022.

== Exhibition curator (selection) ==
As exhibition curator, Cécile Debray has designed and organized around twenty major exhibitions in unexplored territories, including Elles@centrepompidou in 2009 at the Center Pompidou, Dada Africa. Sources et influences extra-occidentales (Dada Africa. Extra-Western sources and influences) in 2017 at the Musée de l'Orangerie or Le modèle noir de Géricault à Matisse (The Black model from Géricault to Matisse in 2019 at the Musée d'Orsay.

- Le Nouveau Réalisme (New Realism), Grand Palais, March - July 2007
- elles@centrepompidou, Centre Pompidou, Paris, 2009/2011; Seattle, SAM, 2012/13; Rio, CCBB, 2013
- Lucian Freud : l'atelier, Centre Pompidou, Paris, 2010
- Matisse, Cézanne, Picasso… L’aventure des Stein, San Francisco, SFMoMA; Paris, Grand Palais, 2011; New York, MET, 2012
- Matisse, paires et séries, Centre Pompidou, Paris, 2012; Copenhague SMK; New York, MET 2013,
- Marcel Duchamp, La peinture, même, Centre Pompidou, September 2014-January 2015
- Balthus, une rétrospective, Scudiere dell Quirinal, Rome, Villa Medicis, Rome 2015; Vienne, Kunstforum, 2016
- Bacon / Nauman. Face à face, Musée Fabre, Montpellier 2017
- Derain,1904-1914, la décennie radicale, Centre Pompidou, Paris, October 2017-January 2018
- Dada Africa. Sources et influences extra-occidentales, Musée de l’Orangerie, October 2017- February 2018
- Nymphéas. Le dernier Monet et l'abstraction américaine, Musée de l'Orangerie 2018
- Franz Marc et August Macke, l'aventure du cavalier bleu, Musée de l'Orangerie 2019
- Le modèle noir de Géricault à Matisse, Musée d'Orsay, 2019
- Les contes cruels de Paula Rego, Musée de l'Orangerie, Paris, October 2018-January 2019
- Préhistoire, une énigme moderne, Centre Pompidou, Paris 2019

== Publications (selection) ==
- La Section d'or, Cécile Debray et Françoise Lucbert, Éditions Cercle d'art, Paris, 2000
- Gilles Aillaud, la jungle des villes, Cécile Debray et Martine Fresia, Didier Ottinger, Actes Sud, 2001
- Le Nouveau Réalisme, Cécile Debray, RMN, 2007
- Cézanne, Matisse, Picasso, l'aventure des Stein, Catalogue de l'exposition au Grand Palais, Cécile Debray (dir.), 2011–2012, Éditions RMN
- Matisse, Cécile Debray, éditions du Centre Pompidou, 2011
- Le Fauvisme, Cécile Debray, collection "Les grands mouvements et tendances", éditions Citadelles et Mazenod, 2014
- La fin des forêts, Cécile Debray, ¡ Viva Villa !, 2019
- Les vies minuscules, Cécile Debray, ¡ Viva Villa !, 2020
- Les Nymphéas de Claude Monet, Cécile Debray, éditions Hazan, 2020
