= Geneviève Fontanel =

French actress (1936–2018)

- Born: 27 June 1936; Bordeaux, France
- Died: 17 March 2018 (aged 81)
- Occupations: Actress, comedian
- Years active: 1960–2015

Geneviève Fontanel (27 June 1936 – 17 March 2018) was a French stage and film actress.

== Early life and education ==
Geneviève Fontanel was born on 27 June 1936.

== Career ==
Fontanel was a member of the Comédie-Française from 1 September 1958 to 31 July 1962.

== Awards ==
In 1999, she received the Molière Award for Best Supporting Actress for her performance in "Délicate balance", and the next year she was again nominated for her performance in Raisons de famille.

She was nominated for the César Awards 1978 for Best Supporting Actress for her role in L'Homme qui aimait les femmes.

== Death ==
Fontanel died on 17 March 2018.

== Filmography ==
Year	Title	Role	Director	Notes
1960	La méprise	Lisette	Yves-André Hubert	TV movie
1961	Quai Notre-Dame	Nénette	Jacques Berthier	
1962	A Monkey in Winter	Marie-Jo	Henri Verneuil	
1963	Skaal	Françoise	Maurice Chateau	TV movie
1964	La caméra explore le temps	Mitzi	Stellio Lorenzi	TV series, Episode: "Le drame de Mayerling"
1964	Male Companion	Socratès's friend	Philippe de Broca	Uncredited
1964	The Adventures of Salavin	Marthe Lanoue	Pierre Granier-Deferre	
1964	Angélique, Marquise des Anges	Carmencita	Bernard Borderie	
1964	Les Indes noires	Maggie	Marcel Bluwal	TV movie
1965	La misère et la gloire	Mélanie Waldor	Henri Spade	TV movie
1965	Sens interdit	Odile	Roger Kahane	TV movie
1966	Idylle villageoise	Mademoiselle Z.	Lazare Iglesis	TV movie
1966	Comment ne pas épouser un milliardaire	Jane	Lazare Iglesis (2)	TV series
1967	Vidocq	Annette	Marcel Bluwal (2); Claude Loursais	TV series, 12 episodes
1967	Barbara	Barbara	Jean-Louis Colmant	TV movie
1967	La vie commence à minuit	Clara	Yvan Jouannet	TV series
1969	Fortune	Jenny Carruthers	Henri Colpi	TV series
1969	Trois hommes sur un cheval	Eric's wife	Marcel Moussy	
1972	Schulmeister, espion de l'empereur	Arabella		TV series, Episode: "Le petit matelot"
1972	Les évasions célèbres	Mme de la Pivardière	Jean-Pierre Decourt	TV series, Episode: "L'étrange trépas de Monsieur de la Pivardière"
1972	De sang froid	Catherine Muria	Abder Isker	TV movie
1973	La femme en bleu	Ghislaine	Michel Deville	
1973	The Dominici Affair	Yvette Dominici	Claude Bernard-Aubert	
1973	Le double assassinat de la rue Morgue	The beautiful Mathilde	Jacques Nahum	TV movie
1973	La maîtresse	Blanche	François Gir	TV movie
1974	Femmes au soleil	Agnès	Liliane Dreyfus	
1974	La rivale	Claire	Sergio Gobbi	
1974	Macbett	Lady Duncan	Jacques Trébouta	TV movie
1974	Dis-moi que tu m'aimes	Pascaline Dorgeval	Michel Boisrond	
1975	Plus amer que la mort	Marie-Thérèse	Michel Wyn	TV movie
1975	L'île des chèvres	Pia	Pierre Badel	TV movie
1975	Amédée ou Comment s'en débarrasser	Madeleine	Marion Sarraut	TV movie
1975	Ce soir on improvise	Mommina	Jean-Marie Coldefy	TV movie
1975	Le père Amable	Céleste	Claude Santelli	TV movie
1976	Robert Macaire	Eloa	Roger Kahane (2)	TV movie
1976	Cours après moi ... que je t'attrape	Simone Daru	Robert Pouret	
1977	The Man Who Loved Women	Hélène	François Truffaut	Nominated - César Award for Best Supporting Actress
1977	La maison des autres	Mme Petiot	Jean-Pierre Marchand	TV series
1977	La grimpe	Catherine	Roland-Bernard	TV movie
1977	Madame Rosa	Maryse	Moshé Mizrahi	
1978	La Zizanie	Madame Berger	Claude Zidi	
1978	Le sacrifice	Daisy Bell	Alexandre Tarta	TV movie
1978	Les ringards	Françoise de Saint-Géraud	Robert Pouret (2)	
1979	Le mal bleu	Mme Laville	Joseph Drimal	TV movie
1980	Achtung Zoll!	Maud	Christian-Jaque	TV series, Episode: "Drôle de pastis"
1980	Rodriguez au pays des merguez	Chipette	Philippe Clair	
1980	Cocktail Molotov	Anne's mother	Diane Kurys	
1980	Chère inconnue	Béatrice	Moshé Mizrahi (2)	
1980	Les amours des années folles	Marie	Jean Pignol	TV series, Episode: "François et la liberté"
1980	Les chevaux du soleil	Marie Aldabran	François Villiers	TV series
1980	Docteur Teyran	Andréa	Jean Chapot	TV movie
1981	La vie des autres	Alzira	Alain Quercy	TV series, Episode: "Vasco"
1981	Les amours des années grises	Alix	Stéphane Bertin	TV series, Episode: "Agnès de rien"
1981	La double vie de Théophraste Longuet	Marceline Longuet	Yannick Andréi	TV movie
1981	La guerre de Troie n'aura pas lieu	Andromaque	Raymond Rouleau	TV movie
1981	Les Cinq Dernières Minutes	Aîda	Claude de Givray	TV series, Episode: "Un coeur sur mesure"
1982	Tête à claques	Mme Crispin-Vautier	Francis Perrin	
1982	L'écarteur	Marinette	Pierre Neurrisse	TV movie
1982	Le journal d'une femme de chambre	Célestine	Jean-Marie Coldefy (2)	TV movie
1982	Les scénaristes ou Les aventures extraordinaires de Robert Michon	Lucienne	Nino Monti	TV movie
1982	Marion	Sylvie	Jean Pignol (2)	TV series, Episode: "Michel Bailleul, architecte naval"
1982	La côte d'amour	Nicole	Charlotte Dubreuil	
1982	Transit	Lili	Takis Candilis	
1967-1983	Au théâtre ce soir	Various	Pierre Sabbagh; Georges Folgoas	TV series, 12 episodes
1983	Les Cinq Dernières Minutes	Simone Caries	Jean-Pierre Desagnat	TV series, Episode: "Rouge Marine"
1983	Le tartuffe	Elmire	Marlène Bertin	TV movie
1983	Les amours romantiques	Valentine de Braimes	Stéphane Bertin (2)	TV series, Episode: "La croix de Berny"
1983	Le grain de sable	Huguette Pommier	Pomme Meffre	
1984	Notre histoire	Madeleine Pecqueur	Bertrand Blier	
1985	Série noire	Yvonne Lenfant	Jacques Ertaud	TV series, Episode: "Pitié pour les rats"
1985	Maguy	Christine	Jean Pignol (3)	TV series, 3 episodes
1986	Les colonnes du ciel	Mother Marie	Gabriel Axel	TV mini-series, Episode: "Compagnons du Nouveau Monde"
1986	Mariage blanc	Pierrette	Peter Kassovitz	TV movie
1987	L'heure Simenon	Mme Florence	Michel Mitrani	TV series, Episode: "Strip-tease"
1987	Zot ka fé zouzou		Véronique Mucret	Short
1988	Le vent des moissons	Yvonne Bouillette	Jean Sagols	TV mini-series
1988	Bonjour l'angoisse	Jacqueline Michaud	Pierre Tchernia	
1988	Regulus 93	Victoire	Catherine Decours; Jean-Luc Tardieu	TV movie
1989	Les enquêtes du commissaire Maigret	Mme Gosselin	Edouard Logereau	TV series, Episode: "Tempête sur la manche"
1990	Un jeu d'enfant	Andréa	Pascal Kané	
1990	Marie Pervenche	Mme Galibier		TV series, Episode: "Faussaires et fossoyeurs"
1985-1991	Maguy	Babar		TV series, 5 episodes
1991	Lola et quelques autres	Lili		TV series, Episode: "Lili ou le miroir de la jeunesse"
1991	Marc et Sophie		Andrée Moracchini	TV series, 1 Episode
1991	La reine blanche	Rita	Jean-Loup Hubert	
1992	Le fils du Mékong	Mme Dupré	François Leterrier	
1994	Au beau rivage	Berthe	Serge Korber	TV movie
1994	Montparnasse-Pondichéry	Mme Meriel	Yves Robert	
1994	Le mangeur de lune	Marcel's mother	Dai Sijie	
1998	Docteur Sylvestre	Clémence	Jacob Berger	TV series, Episode: "Mémoire blanche"
1996-1999	Le refuge	Josette	Alain Schwartzstein; Christian François; Jean-Claude Sussfeld	TV series, 4 episodes
1999	Maigret	Fonsine	Edwin Baily	TV series, Episode: "Meurtre dans un jardin potager"
1999	La bascule	Nicole	Marco Pico	TV movie
1999	One 4 All	Lola	Claude Lelouch	
2000	Marie et Tom	Martha Lévesque	Dominique Baron	TV movie
2000	La bascule à deux	Nicole	Thierry Chabert	TV movie
2001	Navarro	The Duchess	Gérard Marx	TV series, Episode: "Mademoiselle Navarro"
2002	La vie comme elle vient	Sophie	Edwin Baily (2)	TV movie
2002	Le Champ dolent, le roman de la terre	Charlotte	Hervé Baslé	TV mini-series
2003	Les parents terribles	Yvonne	Jean-Claude Brialy	TV movie
2004	Central nuit	Mme Bièvres	Pascale Dallet	TV series, Episode: "Le bruit des murmures"
2005	Faites comme chez vous	Valentine Berthelot	Pascal Heylbroeck; Emmanuelle Dubergey; Bruno Garcia; Gille Galliot	TV series, 19 episodes
2005	Vérité oblige	Janine	Dominique Ladoge	TV series, Episode: "Dénonciation calomnieuse"
2006	La reine Sylvie	Madeleine	Renaud Bertrand	TV movie
2007	Pas tout de suite...	Carole's mother	Marianne Lamour	TV movie
2010	À 10 minutes de la plage	Mother Charles	Stéphane Kappes	TV movie
2011	J'ai peur d'oublier	Fabienne's mother	Élisabeth Rappeneau	TV movie
2012	Boulevard du Palais	Geneviève Joly	Christian Bonnet	TV series, Episode: "Une juste cause", (final appearance)
