= The Woman in Blue =

1973 film

- Directed by: Michel Deville
- Written by: Léo L. Fuchs
- Starring: Michel Piccoli
- Edited by: Raymonde Guyot
- Release date: 14 January 1973
- Running time: 95 minutes
- Country: France
- Language: French

The Woman in Blue (French: La Femme en bleu) is a 1973 French comedy film directed by Michel Deville.

== Cast ==
- Michel Piccoli as Pierre
- Lea Massari as Aurélie
- Michel Aumont as Edmond
- Simone Simon as La dame de Meudon
- Marie Lasas as La femme en bleu
- Amarande as Béatrice
- Geneviève Fontanel as Ghislaine
