= Mona Dol =

French actress

Mona Dol (28 May 1901 – 29 December 1990) was a French actress.

Born Amélie Alice Gabrielle Delbart in Lille, she died in Paris in 1990.

== Selected filmography ==
- Number 33 (1933)
- Lucrezia Borgia (1935)
- The Scandalous Couple (1935)
- The Gardens of Murcia (1936)
- School for Journalists (1936)
- Madame Sans-Gêne (1941)
- Miss Bonaparte (1942)
- The Blue Veil (1942)
- Strange Inheritance (1943)
- First on the Rope (1944)
- Night Shift (1944)
- Boule de suif (1945)
- Dropped from Heaven (1946)
- Messieurs Ludovic (1946)
- Pastoral Symphony (1946)
- Messieurs Ludovic (1946)
- The Marriage of Ramuntcho (1947)
- The Bouquinquant Brothers (1947)
- Danger of Death (1947)
- If It Makes You Happy (1948)
- Une si jolie petite plage (1949)
- Thus Finishes the Night (1949)
- Manèges (1950)
- Two Pennies Worth of Violets (1951)
- His Father's Portrait (1953)
- Quintuplets in the Boarding School (1953)
- The Fire Within (1963)
- The Adventures of Salavin (1964)
