= Georges Duhamel (author) =

French writer (1884–1966)

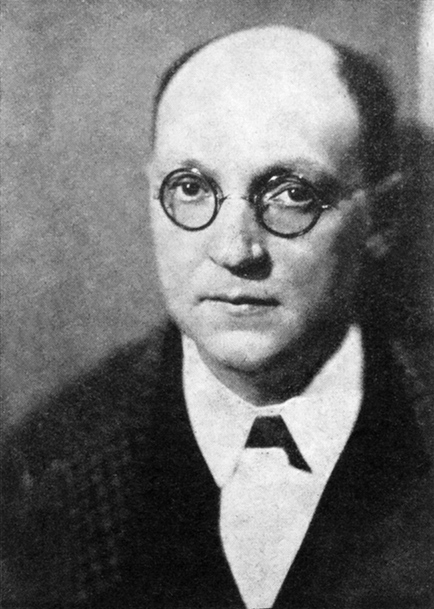
- Born: 30 June 1884; Paris, France
- Died: 13 April 1966 (aged 81); Valmondois, France
- Children: Antoine Duhamel

Signature
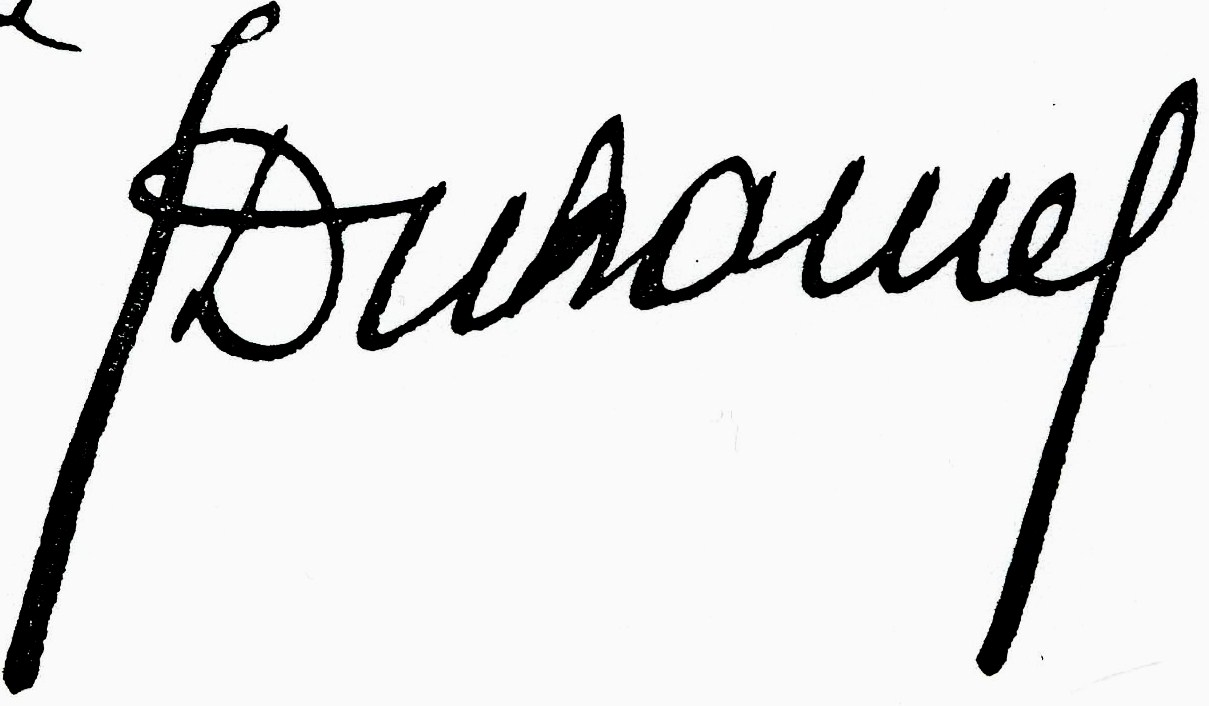

Georges Duhamel (/ˌdjuːəˈmɛl/; French: [dy.amɛl]; 30 June 1884 – 13 April 1966) was a French author, born in Paris. Duhamel trained as a doctor, and during World War I was attached to the French Army. In 1920, he published Confession de minuit, the first of a series featuring the anti-hero Salavin. In 1935, he was elected as a member of the Académie Française. He was nominated for the Nobel Prize in Literature twenty-seven times. He was also the father of the musicologist and composer Antoine Duhamel.

== Biography ==
Georges Duhamel was born in the 13th arrondissement of Paris on 30 June 1884. He was the third child of a family which struggled to survive on the income of his unstable father. The strains and tensions of these early years are reflected in his famous autobiographical novel Le Notaire du Havre (1933), the first book of his Pasquier saga.

In spite of this childhood disrupted by numerous crises, which on far too many occasions caused the Duhamel family to relocate abruptly, Georges nonetheless passed his baccalaureate in 1902. His first choice of career was to become a doctor, although he had a great love of literature and the arts and continued to pursue these interests also.

Between 1906 and 1909 he co-founded an artistic community, l'Abbaye de Créteil, with his future brother in law, Charles Vildrac. The group brought together poets, writers, musicians and painters. From 1912, he became an editor of the literary review Mercure de France. In 1935, he took over the direction of the review and its publishing house. In 1937, he was elected to the French Académie Nationale de Médecine and Académie des Sciences Morales et Politiques. In 1938, because of Duhamel's anti-war stance, he was replaced by Jacques Bernard, but Duhamel returned to directing the Mercure de France publishers in 1945 (he was majority stock-holder of the company).

When the First World War was declared, Duhamel signed up and worked as an army surgeon for four years, often in dangerous situations. This painful experience provided the subject matter for two narratives which brought him immediate success, Vie des martyrs and Civilisation (which won him the Prix Goncourt in 1918). Once he returned to civilian life, Duhamel dedicated himself to literature and defending human civilisation. In 1919, he found two spots in the Val-d'Oise where he would henceforth spend his summers (Sausseron Valley and Valmondois).

In 1935, Duhamel was elected to the 30th chair at the Académie Française. Between 1930 and 1940 he traveled to many conferences in France and abroad, speaking brilliantly of French language and culture as well as promoting the idea of a civilisation built on the human heart rather than technological progress.

Duhamel described himself as "a pacifist and an internationalist." During the Second World War, Duhamel's work was banned by the Germans. He showed courage in his opposition to the occupation and the Petainist faction of the Académie française, later receiving public praise from General Charles de Gaulle.

After the war, Duhamel was named president of the Alliance française and returned to public speaking on French culture. He built up numerous schools of the Alliance. Duhamel's health deteriorated from 1960 and he reduced his activities. He died in Valmondois on 13 April 1966.

Cécile Debray is the great-granddaughter of Georges Duhamel and represents his heirs.

== Works ==
=== General ===
- (in French) Vie des martyrs (1917)
- (in French) Civilisation (1918) (Prix Goncourt)
- La Possession du monde (1919; trans. Eleanor Stimson Brooks as The Heart's Domain)
- Trois journées de la tribu (1921), short stories with four lithographs and ten wood engravings by Maurice de Vlaminck, Éditions de la Nouvelle Revue Française
- Les Hommes abandonnés (1921), short stories reissued in 1927 with 29 lithographs by Maurice de Vlaminck
- (in French) Vie et Aventures de Salavin (5 volumes) (1920–1932)
  - I. (in French) Confession de minuit
  - II. (in French) Deux hommes
  - III. (in French) Journal de Salavin
  - IV. (in French) Le Club des Lyonnais
  - V. (in French) Tel qu'en lui même
- Les Plaisirs et les Jeux (1922)
- Le Prince Jaffar (1924)
- La Pierre d'Horeb (1926)
- Lettres au Patagon (1926)
- Le Voyage de Moscou (1927)
- Mémorial de Cauchois (1927)
- Les Sept Dernières Plaies (1928)
- La Nuit d'orage (1928)
- (in French) Scènes de la vie future (1930)
- (in French) Géographie cordiale de l'Europe (1931)
- Les Jumeaux de Vallangoujard (1931)
- Querelles de famille (1932)
- (in French) Chronique des Pasquier (10 volumes) (1933–1945)
  - I. (in French) Le Notaire du Havre
  - II. (in French) Le Jardin des bêtes sauvages
  - III. (in French) Vue de la terre promise
  - IV. (in French) La Nuit de la Saint Jean
  - V. (in French) Le Désert de Bièvre
  - VI. Les Maîtres
  - VII. (in French) Cécile parmi nous
  - VIII. (in French) Le Combat contre les ombres
  - IX. (in French) Suzanne et les Jeunes Hommes
  - X. (in French) La Passion de Joseph Pasquier
- Fables de mon jardin (1936)
- Mémorial de la guerre blanche (1939)
- Positions Françaises (1940)
- Lieu d'asile (1940)
- Chronique des Saisons amères (1944)
- (in French) La Musique consolatrice (1944)
- Paroles de médecin (1944)
- Inventaire de l'abîme (1944)
- Biographie de mes fantômes (1944)
- Le Temps de la recherche (1947)
- Semaille au vent (1947)
- Le Bestiaire et l'Herbier (1948)
- La Pesée des âmes (1949)
- Le Voyage de Patrice Périot (1950)
- Les Espoirs et les Épreuves (1953)
- Lumières sur ma vie (5 volumes)
  - I. Inventaire de l'abime
  - II. Biographie de mes fântômes
  - III. Le Temps de la recherche
  - IV. La Pesée des âmes
  - V. Les Espoirs et les Épreuves

=== Poetry ===
- Des légendes, des batailles (1907)
- L'Homme en tête (1909)
- Selon ma loi (1910)
- Compagnons (1912)
- Elégies (1920)
- Anthologie de la poèsie lyrique française (1923)
- Les Voix du vieux monde, mis en musique par Albert Doyen (1925)

=== Criticism ===
- Paul Claudel (1913)
- Les Poètes et la Poésie (1914)
- Défense des Lettres (1937)
- Confessions sans pénitence (1941)

=== Theatre ===
- La Lumière (1911)
- Dans l'ombre des statues (1912)
- Le Combat (1913)
- Le Cafard (1916)
- L'œuvre de athlètes (1920)
- Quand vous voudrez (1921)

== See also ==
- Unanimism
