= Nelly and Mr. Arnaud =

- Film poster
- Directed by: Claude Sautet
- Written by: Jacques Fieschi; Claude Sautet; Yves Ulmann
- Produced by: Antoine Gannagé; Alain Sarde
- Starring: Emmanuelle Béart; Michel Serrault; Jean-Hugues Anglade
- Cinematography: Jean-François Robin
- Edited by: Jacqueline Thiédot
- Music by: Philippe Sarde
- Distributed by: BAC Films (France); Cecchi Gori Group (Italy); Prokino Filmverleih (Germany)
- Release date: 18 October 1995 (France)
- Running time: 106 minutes
- Countries: France; Italy; Germany
- Language: French
- Budget: $9 million
- Box office: $19.5 million

Nelly and Mr. Arnaud (French: Nelly et Monsieur Arnaud) is a 1995 French film directed by Claude Sautet and starring Michel Serrault, Emmanuelle Béart and Jean-Hugues Anglade. It won the César Award for Best Director and Best Actor for Michel Serrault.

== Plot ==
Nelly is married to Jérôme, an unemployed man who has ceased looking for work. After being made redundant from her job in publishing, Nelly now takes on occasional work at a printing shop and a bakery. As a result, the couple has fallen six months behind on their apartment rent. Talking with her friend Jacqueline at a coffee shop, she encounters Pierre Arnaud, a wealthy retired businessman who had a languid affair with Jacqueline in the past and who saw Nelly in the past at one of Jacqueline's parties. After discovering Nelly is in debt, Arnaud offers to give Nelly 30,000 francs as a gift. Nelly reluctantly accepts, pays her overdue rent and then leaves her husband.

Nelly agrees to type Arnaud's memoirs, but he insists this will not be to repay the gift; he will pay her. Working at Arnaud's apartment, Nelly learns more of Arnaud's past as a judge in a colony, and later a businessman; he is separated from his wife and largely estranged from his two children.

Nelly has an affair with Vincent, Arnaud's editor. Arnaud feels jealous, although his exact feelings for the much younger Nelly never become entirely clear. Vincent views a new apartment and then asks Nelly to move in. She refuses, telling him she doesn't want to change the character of their relationship, and Vincent immediately breaks up with her.

She continues working for Arnaud until his wife Lucie returns from Geneva for a few days after her partner dies suddenly. Nelly comes to work one morning and finds Arnaud and Lucie with their bags packed, about to leave. Arnaud tells Nelly that he and his wife have decided to take a long round-the-world trip that they always had dreamed of, and see their son in Seattle. The film ends with Arnaud at the airport looking wistful and uncertain, and with Nelly bringing Arnaud's manuscript to Vincent's office, where she is sure to see her former lover.

== Cast ==
- Emmanuelle Béart as Nelly
- Michel Serrault as Pierre Arnaud
- Jean-Hugues Anglade as Vincent Granec
- Claire Nadeau as Jacqueline
- Françoise Brion as Lucie
- Michèle Laroque as Isabelle
- Michael Lonsdale as Dolabella
- Charles Berling as Jerôme

== Critical response ==
On review aggregator website Rotten Tomatoes the film has an approval rating of 96% based on reviews from 23 critics.

== Awards and nominations ==
- BAFTA Awards (UK)
  - Nominated: Best Film not in the English Language
- César Awards (France)
  - Won: Best Actor – Leading Role (Michel Serrault)
  - Won: Best Director (Claude Sautet)
  - Nominated: Best Actor – Supporting Role (Jean-Hugues Anglade)
  - Nominated: Best Actor – Supporting Role (Michael Lonsdale)
  - Nominated: Best Actress – Leading Role (Emmanuelle Béart)
  - Nominated: Best Actress – Supporting Role (Claire Nadeau)
  - Nominated: Best Editing (Jacqueline Thiédot)
  - Nominated: Best Film
  - Nominated: Best Music (Philippe Sarde
  - Nominated: Best Sound (Pierre Lenoir and Jean-Paul Loublier)
  - Nominated: Best Original Screenplay or Adaptation (Jacques Fieschi and Claude Sautet)
- David di Donatello Awards (Italy)
  - Won: Best Foreign Film
- Valladolid Film Festival
  - Nominated: Golden Spike (Claude Sautet)
- Won: Louis Delluc Prize
