= Opera at the Edinburgh International Festival: history and repertoire, 1967–1976 =

Opera continued to be one of the most important features of the Edinburgh International Festival in the third decade.

Edinburgh Festival Opera, a company which first presented operas at the festival in 1965, contributed five productions (with two of them performed over two years), while Glasgow-based Scottish Opera performed seven. Meanwhile, the tradition of inviting guest companies continued with the English Opera Group, Hamburg State Opera, Teatro Comunale, Florence (Maggio Musicale Fiorentino), Frankfurt Municipal Opera, National Theatre, Prague, Deutsche Oper Berlin (twice), Deutsche Oper am Rhein (twice), Teatro Massimo, Palermo, Hungarian State Opera, and Royal Opera, Stockholm all appeared at the festival.

Distinguished conductors included Claudio Abbado, Gerd Albrecht, Daniel Barenboim, Richard Bonynge, Christoph von Dohnányi, Alexander Gibson, Charles Mackerras, and Giuseppe Patanè.

Major opera directors included Peter Ebert, Götz Friedrich, Colin Graham, Jean-Pierre Ponnelle, Peter Ustinov, and Wieland Wagner.

Star female singers included Janet Baker, Agnes Baltsa, Teresa Berganza, Ileana Cotrubaș, Leyla Gencer, Anna Moffo, Birgit Nilsson, Regina Resnik, Renata Scotto, Anja Silja, Elisabeth Söderström, Joan Sutherland, Tatiana Troyanos, Julia Varady, Shirley Verrett, and Galina Vishnevskaya, while male singers included Luigi Alva, Nicolai Gedda, Dietrich Fischer-Dieskau, Geraint Evans, Tito Gobbi, Luciano Pavarotti, Peter Pears, Ruggero Raimondi and John Shirley-Quirk.

== 1967 (three productions) ==
| Orchestra, Choir, Conductor | Director, Set Designer | Female singer | Male singer |
|---|---|---|---|
Edinburgh Festival Opera production of Orfeo ed Euridice by Joseph Haydn, August 25, 29, September 1, 4, 6, 9, 1967 (six performances) at the Kings Theatre
| Scottish National Orchestra; Scottish Opera Chorus; Richard Bonynge | Rudolph Hartmann; Heinz Ludwig designer | Joan Sutherland Euridice; Mary O'Brien Genio | Nicolai Gedda Orfeo; Spiro Malas Creonte; Simon Gilbert Pluto; Malcolm King Chorista I John Graham Chorista II |
Edinburgh Festival Opera production of I Capuleti ed i Montecchi by Bellini, August 30, September 2, 5, 7, 1967 (four performances) at the Kings Theatre
| London Symphony Orchestra; Scottish Opera Chorus; Claudio Abbado | Antonello Madau-Diaz | Anna Moffo Giuletta | Giacomo Aragall Romeo; Walter Monachesi Lorenzo; Luciano Pavarotti Tebaldo; Giovanni Fojani Cappellio |
Scottish Opera production of The Rake's Progress by Igor Stravinsky, August 21, 26, 31, September 8, 1967 (four performances) at the Kings Theatre
| Scottish National Orchestra; Scottish Opera Chorus; Alexander Gibson | Peter Ebert; Ralph Koltai designer | Elizabeth Robson Anne Truelove; Sona Cervena Baba the Turk; Johanna Peters Mother Goose | Alexander Young Tom Rakewell; Peter van der Bilt Nick Shadow; Francis Egerton Sellem; David Kelly Truelove; Ronald Morrison Keeper |

== 1968 (eight productions) ==
| Orchestra, Choir, Conductor | Director, Set Designer | Female singer | Male singer |
|---|---|---|---|
Scottish Opera production of Peter Grimes by Benjamin Britten, August 19, 21, 23, 26, 1968 (four performances) at the Kings Theatre
| Alexander Gibson | Colin Graham; Alix Stone designer | Phyllis Curtin Ellen Orford; Johanna Peters Mrs Sedley; Elizabeth Bainbridge Auntie | Richard Cassilly Peter Grimes; John Shaw Balstrode; Harold Blackburn Swallow |
English Opera Group production of Punch and Judy by Harrison Birtwhistle, August 22, 24, 1968 (two performances) at the Kings Theatre
| David Atherton | Anthony Besch; Peter Rice designer | Maureen Morelle Judy; Jenny Hill Pretty Polly | Geoffrey Chard Choregos; John Cameron Punch; John Winfield Lawyer; Wyndham Parfitt Doctor |
Hamburg State Opera production of Elektra by Richard Strauss, August 29, September 3, 6, 1968 (three performances) at the Kings Theatre
| Philharmonic State Orchestra of Hamburg; Leopold Ludwig | Ulrich Wenk; Alfred Siercke designer | Regina Resnik Clytemnestra; Gladys Kuchta Elektra; Ingrid Bjoner Chrysothemis | Helmut Melchert Aegisthus; Hans Sotin Orestes; Carl Schultz Orestes' tutor |
Hamburg State Opera production of Ariadne auf Naxos by Richard Strauss, August 30, September 4, 7, 1968 (three performances) at the Kings Theatre
| Philharmonic State Orchestra of Hamburg; Leopold Ludwig | Ulrich Wenk; Alfred Siercke designer | Tatiana Troyanos Composer; Sylvia Geszty Zerbinetta; Arlene Saunders Primadonna/Ariadne; Regina Marheineke Najade; Cvetka Ahlin Dryade; Helga Thieme Echo | Toni Blankenheim Major-domo; Herbert Fliether Music master Ernst Kozub Tenor/Bacchus; Rudolf Mandak Officer; Gerhard Unger Dancing master/Brighella; Hans Sotin Wig maker Franz Grundheber Lackey; Heinz Blankenburg Harlequin; Wilhelm Brokmeier Scaramuccio; Noel Mangin Truffaldino |
Hamburg State Opera production of Der fliegende Holländer by Richard Wagner, August 31, September 2, 5, 1968 (three performances) at the Kings Theatre
| Philharmonic State Orchestra of Hamburg; Chorus of the Hamburgische Staatsoper; Charles Mackerras | Wieland Wagner producer and designer | Anja Silja Senta; Ursula Boese Mary | Theo Adam Dutchman; Richard Cassilly Erik; Ernst Wiemann Daland; Gerhard Unger Steersman |
English Opera Group production of The Prodigal Son by Benjamin Britten, August 26, 28, 29, 31 1968 (four performances) at St Mary's Cathedral
| | Colin Graham director and designer Annena Stubbs costumes | | Peter Pears Tempter; Robert Tear Tempter/Younger Son; Bryan Drake Father/Elder Son; John Shirley-Quirk Father; Benjamin Luxon Elder Son; Malcolm Rivers Elder Son; Bernard Dickerson Younger Son |
English Opera Group production of The Burning Fiery Furnace by Benjamin Britten, August 29, 30 1968 (two performances) at St Mary's Cathedral
| | Colin Graham director and designer Annena Stubbs costumes | | Bryan Drake Astrologer; Malcolm Rivers Astrologer; Kenneth Macdonald Nebuchadnezzar; Benjamin Luxon Ananias; Robert Tear Misael; Bernard Dickerson Misael; Paschal Allen Azarias; Peter Leeming Herald |
English Opera Group production of Curlew River by Benjamin Britten, August 27, 30, 1968 (two performances) at St Mary's Cathedral
| | Colin Graham director and designer Annena Stubbs costumes | | Harold Blackburn Abbot; Benjamin Luxon Ferryman; John Shirley-Quirk Ferryman; Malcolm Rivers Traveller; Bryan Drake Traveller; Robert Tear Madwoman; Peter Pears Madwoman |

== 1969 (four productions) ==
| Orchestra, Choir, Conductor | Director, Set Designer | Female singer | Male singer |
|---|---|---|---|
Teatro Comunale, Florence (Maggio Musicale Fiorentino) production of Maria Stuarda by Donizetti, August 25, 28, September 1, 1969 (three performances) at the Kings Theatre
| Orchestra, Chorus and Ballet of the Teatro Comunale, Florence; Nino Sanzogno | Giorgio de Lullo; Pierluigi Pizzi designer | Shirley Verrett Elizabeth; Leyla Gencer Mary Stuart; Anna di Stasio Ann | Franco Tagliavini Leicester; Agostino Ferrin Talbot; Giulio Fioravanti Cecil; Mario Frosini Herald |
Teatro Comunale, Florence (Maggio Musicale Fiorentino) production of Rigoletto by Verdi, August 26, 30, September 3, 1969 (three performances) at the Kings Theatre
| Orchestra, Chorus and Ballet of the Teatro Comunale, Florence; Alberto Erede | Sandro Segui; Pierluigi Pizzi designer | Renata Scotto Gilda; Biancarosa Zanibelli Maddalena; Anna Falcone Giovanna; Giuliana Matteini Countess Ceprano | Renato Cioni Duke; Mario Zanasi Rigoletto; Franco Ventriglia Sparafucile; Plinio Ciabassi Monterone; Giorgio Giorgetti Marullo; Dino Formichini Matteo Borsa; Mario Frosini Ceprano; Guerrando Rigiri Usher |
Teatro Comunale, Florence (Maggio Musicale Fiorentino) production of Il signor Bruschino by Rossini and Gianni Schicchi by Puccini, September 4, 6, 10, 12, 1969 (four performances) at the Kings Theatre
| Orchestra, Chorus and Ballet of the Teatro Comunale, Florence; Aldo Ceccato | Il signor Bruschino; Filippo Crivelli director Gianni Vagnetti designer Gianni Schicchi; Tito Gobbi director Ferdinando Ghelli designer | Jolanda Meneguzzer Sofia; Anna di Stasio Marianna Maddalena Bonifaccio Lauretta; Flora Rafanelli Zita; Giuliana Matteini Nella; Anna di Stasio La Cesca | Claudio Desderi Gaudenzio; Renato Capecchi Bruschino Senior; Valiano Natali Bruschino Junior; Giuseppe Baratti Florville; Paolo Pedani Commissioner of Police; Graziano Del Vivo Filiberto Tito Gobbi Gianni Schicchi; Ugo Benelli Rinuccio; Dino Formichini Gherando; Graziano Del Vivo Betto di Signa; Plinio Ciabassi Simone; Giorgio Giorgetti Marco; Augusto Frati Spinelloccio; Paolo Pedani Ser Amantio; Mario Frosini Pinellino; Valiano Natali Guccio |
Teatro Comunale, Florence (Maggio Musicale Fiorentino) production of Sette Canzoni by Malipiero and Il prigioniero by Dallapiccola, August 29, September 5, 11, 1969 (three performances) at the Kings Theatre
| Orchestra, Chorus and Ballet of the Teatro Comunale, Florence; Nino Sanzogno | Alessandro Fersen; Emanuele Luzzati designer Sette Canzoni; Gianni Polidori designer Il prigioniero | Magda Olivero Mother Claudia Parada Mother | Renato Capecchi Ballad singer/Drunk; Guerrando Rigiri Inner voice Giuseppe Baratti Lover; Scipio Colombo Bell ringer Giorgio Giorgetti Bell ringer Scipio Colombo Prisoner; Mirto Picchi Jailer/Grand Inquisitor |

== 1970 (seven productions) ==
| Orchestra, Choir, Conductor | Director, Set Designer | Female singer | Male singer |
|---|---|---|---|
Frankfurt Municipal Opera production of The Fiery Angel by Sergei Prokofiev, August 24, 26, 29, 1970 (three performances) at the Kings Theatre
| Christoph von Dohnányi | Václav Kašlík; Josef Svoboda designer Jan Skalicky costumes | Anja Silja Renata; Soňa Červená Fortune teller Agnes Baltsa Abbess; Rosl Zapf Innkeeper | Rudolf Constantin Ruprecht; Vladimir de Kanel Potboy; Alfred Vökt Jakob Glock; Willy Müller Agrippa von Nettesheim; Stephan Mettin Count Heinrich; Armin Maeder Servant; Kurt Wolinski Doctor; Edwin Feldmann Mathias; Dieter Weller Inquisitor |
Scottish Opera production of Elegy for Young Lovers by Hans Werner Henze, August 25, 27, 29, 1970 (three performances) at the Kings Theatre
| Alexander Gibson | Hans Werner Henze; Ralph Koltai sets Fausto Moroni costumes | Catherine Gayer Hilda Mack; Jill Gomez Elisabeth; Soňa Červená Carolina | David Hillman Toni; Lawrence Richard Dr Reischmann; John Shirley-Quirk Mittenhofer |
National Theatre Prague production of The Bartered Bride by Bedřich Smetana, August 31, September 4, 11, 1970 (three performances) at the Kings Theatre
| Orchestra, Chorus and Ballet of the National Theatre, Prague; Jaroslav Krombholc | Luděk Mandaus; Karel Svolinský designer | Štěpánka Jelinková Ludmila; Daniela Šounová Mařenka; Marcela Machotková Mařenka; Jaroslava Procházková Háta | Jindřich Jindrák Krušina; Zdeněk Otava Micha; Milan Karpíšek Vašek; Oldřich Lindauer Vašek; Ivo Žídek Jeník; Eduard Haken Kecal |
National Theatre Prague production of Dalibor by Bedřich Smetana, September 1, 7, 12, 1970 (three performances) at the Kings Theatre
| Orchestra and Chorus of the National Theatre, Prague; Jaroslav Krombholc | Václav Kašlik; Josef Svoboda designer Jarmila Konečná costumes | Naděžda Kniplová Milada; Alena Miková Milada; Eva Zikmundová Jitka | Jindřich Jindrák Vladislav; Ivo Žídek Dalibor; Vilém Přibyl Dalibor; Rudolf Jedlička Budivoy; Jaroslav Horáčekl Beneš; Eduard Haken Beneš; Victor Koči Vitek |
National Theatre Prague production of The Cunning Little Vixen by Leoš Janáček, September 2, 10, 1970 (two performances) at Kings Theatre
| Orchestra, Chorus and Ballet of the National Theatre, Prague; Bohumil Gregor | Ladislav Štros; Vladimir Nývlt designer Marcel Porkorný costumes | Jaroslava Procházková Forester's wife/Owl; Jaroslava Dobrá Pásková; Helena Tattermuschová Vixen; Eva Zikmundová Fox; Eva Hlobilová Lapák; Marcela Machotková Cock/Jay; Štěpánka Jelinková Hen; Věra Staková Frantík; Ludmila Erbenová Pepik | Jindřich Jindrák Forester; Jan Hlavsa Schoolmaster; Dalibor Jedlička Vicar/Badger; Josef Heriban Harašta; Rudolf Vonásek Pásek |
National Theatre Prague production of The Makropoulos Affair by Leoš Janáček, September 3, 8, 1970 (two performances) at Kings Theatre
| Orchestra and Chorus of the National Theatre, Prague; Bohumil Gregor | Václav Kašlik; Josef Svoboda designer Jarmila Konečná costumes | Naděžda Kniplová Emilia Marty; Helena Tattermuschová Kristina | Ivo Žídek Albert Gregor; Rudolf Jedlička Jaroslav Prus; Victor Koči Janek; Karel Berman Kolenatý; Rudolf Vonásek Vitek; Milan Karpíšek Hauk/Šendorf |
National Theatre Prague production of The Excursions of Mr. Brouček by Leoš Janáček, September 5, 9, 1970 (two performances) at Kings Theatre
| Orchestra, Chorus and Ballet of the National Theatre, Prague; Jaroslav Krombholc | Hanuš Thein; Oldřich Šimáček designer Jan Skalický costumes | Helena Tattermuschová Málinka; Marcela Lemariová Waiter/Child prodigy/Pupil; Jaroslava Procházková Housekeeper/Kedruta | Beno Blachut Brouček; Miroslav Frydlewicz Mazal/Blankytný/Petřík; Dalibor Jedlička Sacristan/Lunobor/Domšik; Karel Berman Würfl/Čaroskvouci/Alderman; Rudolf Jedlička Oblačný/Vacek; Milan Karpíšek Duhoslav/Miroslav; Rudolf Vonásek Harfoboj/Vojta; Zdeněk Otava Svatopluk Cech |

== 1971 (four productions) ==
| Orchestra, Choir, Conductor | Director, Set Designer | Female singer | Male singer |
|---|---|---|---|
Edinburgh Festival Opera in collaboration with Teatro Comunale, Florence (Maggio Musicale Fiorentino) production of La cenerentola by Rossini, August 23, 25, 27, September 7, 9, 1971 (five performances) at the Kings Theatre
| London Symphony Orchestra; Scottish Opera Chorus; Claudio Abbado | Jean-Pierre Ponnelle producer/designer | Teresa Berganza Angelina; Eugenia Ratti Clorinda; Margherita Guglielmi Clorinda; Laura Zannini Thisbe | Luigi Alva Don Ramiro; Renato Capecchi Dandini; Paolo Montarsolo Din Magnifico; Ugo Trama Alidoro |
Scottish Opera production of Die Walküre by Wagner, August 26, 28, 31, 1971 (three performances) at the Kings Theatre
| Scottish National Orchestra; Alexander Gibson | Peter Ebert; Michael Knight designer | Leonore Kirschstein Sieglinde; Helga Dernesch Brünnhilde; Anna Reynolds Fricka; Heather Howson Gerhilde; Nancy Gottschalk Ortlinde; Patricia Purcell Waltraute; Joanna Peters Schwertleite; Patricia Hay Helmwige; Phyllis Cannan Siegrune; Joan Clarkson Grimgerde; Clare Livingston Rossweise | Charles Craig Siegmund; William McCue Hunding; David Ward Wotan |
Deutsche Oper Berlin production of Die Entführung aus dem Serail by Mozart, August 30, September 1, 3, 1971 (three performances) at the Kings Theatre
| Orchestra and Chorus of the Deutsche Oper; Heinrich Hollreiser | Gustav Rudolf Sellner; Wilhelm Reinking designer | Erika Köth Constanze; Carol Malone Blonde | Werner Hollweg Belmonte; Martin Vantin Pedrillo; Walter Dicks Bassa Selim; Bengt Rundgren Osmin; Josef Greindl Osmin |
Deutsche Oper Berlin production of Melusine by Aribert Reimann, September 2, 4, 1971 (two performances) at the Kings Theatre
| Orchestra of the Deutsche Oper; Reinhard Peters | Gustav Rudolf Sellner; Gottfried Pilz designer | Catherine Gayer Melusine; Martha Mödl Pythia; Gitta Mikes Madame Lapérouse | Donald Grobe Oleander; Barry McDaniel Count von Lusignan; Ivan Sardi Surveyor; Klaus Lang Mason; Loren Driscoll Architect; Josef Greindl Oger |

== 1972 (six productions) ==
| Orchestra, Choir, Conductor | Director, Set Designer | Female singer | Male singer |
|---|---|---|---|
Deutsche Oper am Rhein production of Die Soldaten by Bernd Alois Zimmermann, August 21, 22, 1972 (two performances) at the Kings Theatre
| Günther Wick | Georg Reinhardt; Heinrich Wendel designer Günther Kappel costumes | Catherine Gayer Marie; Trudeliese Schmidt Charlotte; Henny Ekström Wesener's mother Gwynn Cornell Stolzius' mother Faith Puleston Countess de la Roche | Marius Rintzler Wesener; Peter-Christophe Runge Stolzius; Georg Paucker Colonel von Spannheim; Anton de Ridder Desportes; Franz Radinger Hunter; Albert Weikenmeier Captain Pirzel; Richard Allen Eisenhardt; Wilhelm Ernest Captain Haudy; Wicus Slabbert Captain Mary; Nicola Tagger Young Count de la Roche |
Deutsche Oper am Rhein production of Rappresentatione di Anima e di Corpo by Emilio de' Cavalieri, August 24, 25, 1972 (two performances) at the St Mary's Cathedral
| Alberto Erede | Georg Reinhardt; Heinrich Wendel designer Liselotte Erler costumes | Rachel Yakar Anima; Faith Puleston Piacere; Trudeliese Schmidt Vita mondana Josephine Engelskamp Anima Beata | Peter-Christophe Runge Corpo; Alva Tripp Intelletto; Malcolm Smith Consiglio; Toshimitsu Kimura Tempo; William Holley Angelo custode Marius Rintzler Mondo; Zenon Kosnowski Anima dannata |
Scottish Opera production of The Trojans by Berlioz, August 24, 26, September 6, 1972 (three performances) at the Kings Theatre
| Alexander Gibson | Peter Ebert; Hans-Ulrich Schmückle designer Sylta Busse Schmückle costumes | Helga Dernesch Cassandra; Patricia Hay Ascanias; Patricia Purcell Hecuba; Elaine McDonald Andromache; Janet Baker Dido; Bernadette Greevy Anna | Gregory Dempsey Aeneas; Delme Bryn-Jones Chorebus; John Lawson Graham Pantheus; Joseph Rouleau Ghost of Hector/Narbal; Norman White Priam; John Robertson Helenus/Hylas; Mike Carson Astyanax; Derek Blackwell Iopas |
Teatro Massimo production of Attila by Verdi, August 28, 30, September 1, 1972 (three performances) at Kings Theatre
| Giuseppe Patanè | Aldo Mirabella Vassallo; Giulio Coltelacci designer | Luisa Maragliano Odabella; Maria Parazzini Odabella | Ruggero Raimondi Attila; Renato Bruson Ezio; Bruno Prevedi Foresto; Umberto Scala Uldino; Franco Pugliese Leone |
Teatro Massimo production of La straniera by Bellini, August 31, September 2, 5, 8, 1972 (four performances) at Kings Theatre
| Nino Sanzogno | Mauro Bolognini; Marcel Escoffier designer | Renata Scotto Agnese of Pomerania; Elena Zilio Isoletta | Domenico Trimarchi Leopoldo; Ottavio Garaventa Arturo; Guido Mazzini Duke of Montolino; Gian Paolo Corradi Osburgo; Enrico Campi Prior |
Teatro Massimo production of Elisabetta, regina d'Inghilterra by Rossini, September 4, 7, 9, 1972 (three performances) at the Kings Theatre
| Nino Sanzogno; Giacomo Zani | Mauro Bolognini; Gaetano Pompa designer | Leyla Gencer Elisabetta; Margherita Guglielmi Matilda; Giovanna Vighi Enrico | Umberto Grilli Leicester; Pietro Bottazzo Norfolk; Gian Paolo Corradi Guglielmo |

== 1973 (four productions) ==
| Orchestra, Choir, Conductor | Director, Set Designer | Female singer | Male singer |
|---|---|---|---|
Edinburgh Festival Opera production of Don Giovanni by Mozart, August 20, 23, 25, September 6, 8, 1973 (five performances) at the Kings Theatre
| English Chamber Orchestra; Scottish Opera Chorus; Daniel Barenboim | Peter Ustinov producer/designer | Antigone Sgourda Donna Anna; Heather Harper Donna Elvira; Helen Donath Zerlina | Peter Lagger Commendatore; Luigi Alva Don Ottavio; Roger Soyer Don Giovanni; Geraint Evans Leporello; Alberto Rinaldi Masetto |
Hungarian State Opera and Ballet Company production of Bluebeard's Castle together with the ballet The Miraculous Mandarin, both by Béla Bartók, August 24, 28, 30, 1973 (three performances) at the Kings Theatre
| János Ferencsik | András Miko; Gábor Forray designer Tivadar Márk costumes | Katalin Kasza Judith; Olga Szönyi Judith | György Melis Bluebeard; András Faragó Bluebeard |
Hungarian State Opera production of Blood Wedding by Sándor Szokolay, August 27, 29 1973 (two performances) at the Kings Theatre
| András Kórodi | András Miko; Zoltán Fülöp designer Tivadar Márk costumes | Erzsébet Komlóssy Mother; Katalin Kasza Neighbour; Stefánia Moldován Leonardo's wife Anita Szabó Mother-in-law; Erzsébet Hágy Bride; Zsuzsa Barlay Death | Ferenc Szönyi Bridegroom; András Faragó Leonardo; Irén Szecsódy Servant; Endre Várhelyi Father of the Bride; Sándor Palcsó Moon |
English Opera Group production of Death in Venice by Britten, September 4, 7, 1973 (two performances) at the Kings Theatre
| English Chamber Orchestra; Steuart Bedford | Colin Graham; John Piper designer Charles Knode costumes | Deanne Bergsma Polish mother Elizabeth Griffiths Daughter; Melanie Phillips Daughter; Sheila Humphreys Governess | Peter Pears Aschenbach; John Shirley-Quirk Traveller and others James Bowman Voice of Apollo; Robert Huguenin Tadzio; Nicholas Kirby Jaschiu |

== 1974 (six productions) ==
| Orchestra, Choir, Conductor | Director, Set Designer | Female singer | Male singer |
|---|---|---|---|
Scottish Opera production of Alceste by Gluck, August 19, 22, 24, 27, 1974 (four performances) at the Kings Theatre
| Scottish National Orchestra; Scottish Opera Chorus; Scottish Ballet; Alexander Gibson | Anthony Besch; John Stoddart designer | Julia Varady Alceste | Robert Tear Admetus; Peter van der Bilt High Priest/Apollo; Delme Bryn-Jones Hercules; David Fieldsend Evandre; Norman White Thanatos; Arthur Jackson Herald |
Edinburgh Festival Opera production of Don Giovanni by Mozart, August 21, 23, 26, 1974 (three performances) at the Kings Theatre
| English Chamber Orchestra; Scottish Opera Chorus; Leonard Friedman Ensemble; Daniel Barenboim | Peter Ustinov producer/designer | Antigone Sgourda Donna Anna; Heather Harper Donna Elvira; Danièle Perriers Zerlina | Peter Lagger Commendatore; Luigi Alva Don Ottavio; Roger Soyer Don Giovanni; Geraint Evans Leporello; Alberto Rinaldi Masetto |
Royal Swedish Opera production of Elektra by Richard Strauss, August 29, September 1, 6, 1974 (three performances) at the Kings Theatre
| Orchestra of the Royal Swedish Opera; Berislav Klobucar | Rudolf Hartmann; Jan Brazda designer | Barbro Ericson Clytemnestra; Birgit Nilsson Elektra; Danica Mastilović Elektra; Berit Lindholm Chrystothemis; Kjerstin Dellert Clytemnestra's confidante Sylvia Lindenstrand Clytemnestra's trainbearer Margareta Bergström Overseer | Kolbjörn Höiseth Aegisthus; Ragnar Ulfung Aegisthus; Erik Saedén Orestes; Björn Asker Preceptor; John-Erik Jacobsson Young servant Paul Höglund Old servant |
Royal Swedish Opera production of Jenůfa by Leoš Janáček, August 31, September 1, 4, 7, 1974 (four performances) at Kings Theatre
| Orchestra and Chorus of the Royal Swedish Opera; Berislav Klobucar | Götz Friedrich; Reinhart Zimmerman designer Jan Skalicky costumes | Margareta Bergström Grandmother Buryja; Kerstin Meyer Kostelnicka; Elisabeth Söderström Jenůfa; Laila Andersson Jenůfa; Kjerstin Dellert Mayor's wife Hillevi Blylods Karolka | Kolbjörn Höiseth Laca Klemen; Matti Kastu Laca Klemen; Jonny Blanc Stewa Buryja; Bo Lundberg Foreman; Sten Wahlund Mayor |
Royal Swedish Opera production of Il pastor fido by Handel, September 3, 5, 1974 (two performances) at Kings Theatre
| Orchestra, Chorus and Ballet of the Royal Swedish Opera; Charles Farncombe | Bengt Peterson; David Walker costumes | Margot Rödin Apollo/Mirtillo; Laila Andersson Erato/Amarilli; Berit Sköld Terpsichore; Rosy Jauckens Euterpe; Lisbeth Larsson Urania; Helena Nydahl Thalia; Karin Grimma Melpomene; Annika Löf Clio; Lillemor Arvidsson Polyhymnia; Yvonne Sjöberg Galliope; Sylvia Lindenstrand Dorinda; Ileana Peterson Eurilla | Ragne Wahlroth Bacchus; Tord Slättegård Silvio; Sten Wahlund Tirenio |
Royal Swedish Opera production of The Vision of Thérèse by Lars Johan Werle, September 2, 3, 1974 (two performances) at the Gateway Theatre
| Orchestra of the Royal Swedish Opera; Thomas Schuback | Lars Runsten; Kerstin Hedeby costumes | Margareta Bergström Street sweeper Busk Margit Jonsson Francoise; Edith Thallaug Thérèse; Gunilla Slättegård Factory girl Hillevi Blylods Factory girl | Frederik Söderling Stranger; Erik Saedén Julien; Lucian Savin Blind violinist Kåge Jehrlander Colombel |

== 1975 (four productions) ==
| Orchestra, Choir, Conductor | Director, Set Designer | Female singer | Male singer |
|---|---|---|---|
Edinburgh Festival Opera production of Le nozze di Figaro by Mozart, August 25, 28, 30, September 7, 10, 1975 (five performances) at the Kings Theatre
| English Chamber Orchestra, Scottish Opera Chorus, Daniel Barenboim | Geraint Evans; John Fraser designer | Teresa Berganza Cherubino; Heather Harper Countess; Ileana Cotrubaș Susanna; Birgit Finnilä Marcellina; Danièle Perriers Barbarina | Dietrich Fischer-Dieskau Count; Geraint Evans Figaro; William McCue Dr Bartolo; John Fryatt Don Basilio; Malcolm Donnelly Antonio; John Robertson Don Curzio |
Scottish Opera production of Hermiston by Robin Orr, August 27, 29, 1975 (two performances) at the Kings Theatre
| Scottish Chamber Orchestra, Scottish Opera Chorus, Alexander Gibson (conductor) | Toby Robertson producer | Patricia Kern Kirstie; Catherine Gayer Christina | Michael Langdon Lord Hermiston; Lenus Carlson Archie Weir; Nigel Douglas Frank Innes; Gordon Sanderson Dand |
Deutsche Oper Berlin production of Lulu by Alban Berg, September 9, 12, 1975 (two performances) at the Kings Theatre
| Orchestra of the Deutsche Oper, Reinhard Peters | Gustav Rudolf Sellner; Filippo Sanjust designer | Catherine Gayer Lulu; Patricia Johnson Countess Geschwitz; Maria José Brill Wardrobe mistress Barbara Scherler Schoolboy | Walter Dicks Doctor/Jack the Ripper; Loren Driscoll Painter; Hans Günther Nöcker Dr Schön; Donald Grobe Alwa; Gerd Feldhoff Animal tamer/Rodrigo; Josef Greindl Schigolch; Karl-Ernst Mercker Prince; Ernst Krukowski Thearree Dorector; Leopold Clam Valet; Manfred Haake Aujust |
Deutsche Oper Berlin production of Salome by Richard Strauss, September 11, 13, 1975 (two performances) at the Kings Theatre
| Orchestra of the Deutsche Oper, Gerd Albrecht | Wieland Wagner producer | Ursula Schroder-Feinen Salome; Astrid Varnay Herodias; Maria José Brill Page; Barbara Scherler Slave | Peter Gougaloff Narraboth; Ernst Krukowski First Soldier; Victor von Halem Second Soldier; Klaus Lang Third Soldier; William Dooley Jokanaan; Hans Beirer Herod; Martin Vantin First Jew; Karl-Ernst Mercker Second Jew; Cornelius van Dijk Third Jew; William Wu Fourth Jew; Joseph Becker Fifth Jew; Josef Greindl First Nazarene; Walter Dicks Second Nazarene |

== 1976 (five productions) ==
| Orchestra, Choir, Conductor | Director, Set Designer | Female singer | Male singer |
|---|---|---|---|
Scottish Opera production of Macbeth by Verdi, August 23, 26, 28, 30, 1976 (four performances) at the Kings Theatre
| Scottish Philharmonia; Scottish Opera Chorus; Alexander Gibson | David Pountney; Ralph Koltai designer | Galina Vishnevskaya Lady Macbeth; Lola Biagioni Lady-in-waitinfg | Norman Bailey Macbeth; David Ward Banquo; David Hillman Macduff; Graham Clark Malcolm; Arthur Jackson Doctor |
Edinburgh Festival Opera production of Le nozze di Figaro by Mozart, August 25, 27, 29, 31, 1976 (four performances) at the Kings Theatre
| English Chamber Orchestra, Scottish Opera Chorus, Daniel Barenboim | Geraint Evans; John Fraser designer | Teresa Berganza Cherubino; Heather Harper Countess; Judith Blegen Susanna; Birgit Finnilä Marcellina; Elizabeth Gale Barbarina | Dietrich Fischer-Dieskau Count; Geraint Evans Figaro; William McCue Dr Bartolo; John Fryatt Don Basilio; Malcolm Donnelly Antonio; John Robertson Don Curzio |
Deutsche Oper am Rhein production of Parsifal by Wagner, September 2, 4, 1976 (two performances) at the Kings Theatre
| Düsseldorf Symphony Orchestra; Chorus of the Deutsche Oper am Rhein; Günther Wich | Georg Reinhardt; Heinrich Wendel designer Günter Kappel costumes | Eva Randová Kundry; Keiko Yano Voice from Above | Leif Roar Amfortas; Constantin Dumitru Titurel; Marius Rintzler Titurel; Peter Meven Gurnemanz; Malcolm Smith Gurnemanz; Sven Olaf Eliasson Parsifal; Werner Götz Parsifal |
Deutsche Oper am Rhein production of L'italiana in Algeri by Rossini, September 5, 8, 10, 1976 (three performances) at the Kings Theatre
| Düsseldorf Symphony Orchestra; Chorus of the Deutsche Oper am Rhein; Peter Schneider | Jean-Pierre Ponnelle producer | Nassrin Azarmi Elvira; Patricia Parker Zulma; Julia Hamari Isabella | Constantin Dumitru Mustafa; Toshimitsu Kimura Haly; Ugo Benelli Lindoro; Zenon Kosnowski Taddeo |
Deutsche Oper am Rhein production of Moses und Aron by Schoenberg, September 7, 11, 1976 (two performances) at the Kings Theatre
| Düsseldorf Symphony Orchestra; Chorus and Ballet of the Deutsche Oper am Rhein; Günter Wich | Georg Reinhardt; Heinrich Wendel designer Günter Kappel and Pet Halmen costumes | Nassrin Azarmi Young girl Keiko Yano Sick woman | Peter Meven Moses; Sven Olaf Eliasson Aron; Alva Tripp Young man Jaroslav Stajnc Another man Helmut Fehn Priest; Kurt Gester Ephraimit |

== Opera in concert ==
Die drei Pintos by Carl Maria von Weber, orchestrated by Gustav Mahler, was performed by the Edinburgh Festival Opera, in concert at the Usher Hall on 25 August 1976.

== See also ==
- Opera at the Edinburgh International Festival: history and repertoire, 1947–1956
- Opera at the Edinburgh International Festival: history and repertoire, 1957–1966
- Drama at the Edinburgh International Festival: history and repertoire, 1947–1956
- Drama at the Edinburgh International Festival: history and repertoire, 1957–1966
- Drama at the Edinburgh International Festival: history and repertoire, 1967–1976
- Ballet at the Edinburgh International Festival: history and repertoire, 1947–1956
- Ballet at the Edinburgh International Festival: history and repertoire, 1957–1966
- Ballet at the Edinburgh International Festival: history and repertoire, 1967–1976
- Musicians at the Edinburgh International Festival, 1947–1956
- Musicians at the Edinburgh International Festival, 1957–1966
- Musicians at the Edinburgh International Festival, 1967–1976
- Visual Arts at the Edinburgh International Festival, 1947–1976
- World premieres at the Edinburgh International Festival
- Edinburgh Festival Fringe
- List of Edinburgh festivals
- List of opera festivals
