= The Two Widows =

Opera by Bedřich Smetana

- Opera by Bedřich Smetana
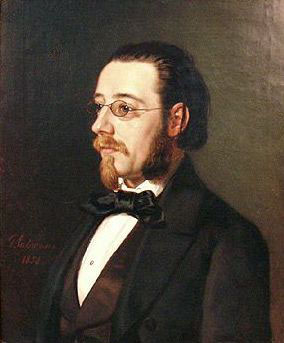
- The composer in 1854, painting by Geskel Saloman
- Native title: Dvĕ vdovy
- Librettist: Emanuel Züngel
- Language: Czech
- Based on: Les deux veuves by Jean Pierre Felicien Mallefille
- Premiere: 27 March 1874; Prague Czech Theatre, Prague

The Two Widows (Czech: Dvĕ vdovy) is a two-act Czech opera by Bedřich Smetana based on the libretto of Emanuel František Züngel. The libretto is based on Jean Pierre Felicien Mallefille's one-act play Les deux veuves. The opera was composed between June 1873 and January 1874, and its premiere took place on 27 March 1874 at the Prague Czech Theatre under the direction of Smetana. However, this premiere was not successful and the opera was rewritten in 1874. The spoken dialogue was replaced by through-composed recitatives and some of the music and characters were reworked. The second premiere on 20 October 1874 was very successful. A further revised version was premiered on 17 March 1878, under Adolf Čech.

For a later performance in Hamburg in 1882 "Smetena reluctan[t]ly added a trio in act 1 and an alternative ending to Anežka's aria in act 2, and consented to a redivision of the opera into three acts".

== Performance history ==
The US premiere took place in New York on 23 October 1949 and it was first given in the UK on 17 June 1963 at the Guildhall School of Music. In December 1993 it was produced by English National Opera at the London Coliseum, with Marie McLaughlin and Anne-Marie Owens as the two widows, David Rendall as Ladislav and Donald Adams as Mumlal.

Kurt Honolka provided a German version in 1958.

The opera was presented by Scottish Opera in January 1980 at the Theatre Royal Glasgow with Dennis O'Neill and William McCue among the cast, conducted by Guy Woolfenden, and then in 2008 at the Edinburgh Festival.

== Roles ==
| Role | Voice type | Premiere cast, 27 March 1874 (Conductor: Bedřich Smetana) | Revised premiere cast, 15 March 1878 (Conductor: Adolf Čech) |
|---|---|---|---|
| Karolina, a young widow | soprano | Ema Maislerová | Terezie Boschettiová |
| Anežka, her cousin, also a young widow | soprano | Marie Sittová | Marie Sittová |
| Ladislav, a landowner | tenor | Antonín Vávra | Antonín Vávra |
| Mumlal, gamekeeper to Karolina | bass | Karel Čech | Karel Čech |
| Toník, a gardener | tenor | - | Jan Šára |
| Lidka, his fiancée, a chamber girl | soprano | - | Marie Laušmannová |
Peasants, chorus

== Synopsis ==
Place: A castle in Bohemia (now Czech Republic).

=== Act 1 ===
At the castle, people are celebrating. The two widows, Karolina and Anežka, are sisters but are very different personalities. Karolina, the wealthy owner, is happy about her liberty and independence, while Anežka cannot make friends because she is still in mourning. Karolina is being pursued by Ladislav, but does not want to marry him, so she conspires to make Anežka fall in love with him. Karolina invites Ladislav to the castle, where he is arrested by Mumlal, the gamekeeper. Ladislav is condemned by Karolina to one day's house arrest in the castle, and accepts the punishment. Anežka still shows no interest in him. At the end of the act, Lidka (Mumlal's daughter) and her suitor Toník, with the chorus, sing about love.

=== Act 2 ===
While in prison, Ladislav sings a love song, which awakens romantic feelings in Anežka. However, learning of Karolina's scheme and Ladislav's confession, she will not show weakness. Only when Karolina begins to flirt with Ladislav does Anežka admits her feelings for him. Mumlal cannot keep Lidka and Toník apart. At the ball, both couples become engaged.

== Recordings ==
- 1956, Jaroslav Krombholc (conductor), Prague National Theatre Orchestra and Chorus; Drahomíra Tikalová, Ivo Žídek, Maria Tauberová, Miloslava Fidlerová, Antonín Zlesák, Eduard Haken (Supraphon)
- 1974, Jaroslav Krombholc (conductor), Symphony Orchestra and Chorus of the Prague Radio; Jana Jonášová, Marcela Machotková, Miroslav Švejda, Dalibor Jedlička, Alfred Hampel, Daniela Šounová-Brouková
- 1975, František Jílek (conductor), Prague National Theatre Chorus and Orchestra; Naďa Šormová, Marcela Machotková, Jiří Zahradníček, Jaroslav Horáček, Zdeněk Švehla, Daniela Šounová (Supraphon)
- 2025, Robert Jindra (conductor), Prague Radio Symphony Orchestra, Prague National Theatre Chorus; Adriana Kučerová (Karolina), Kateřina Kněžíková (Anežka), Adam Plachetka (Mumlal), Pavol Breslik (Ladislav), Jana Sibera (Lidunka), Petr Nekoranec (Toník) (Naxos)
