= Mirandolina (opera) =

Comic opera in three acts by Bohuslav Martinů

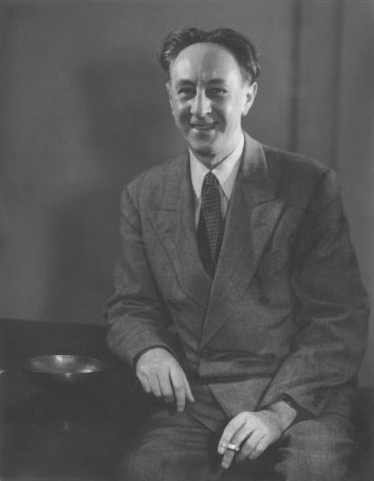
Bohuslav Martinů in 1945

Mirandolina (H. 346) is a 1953–54 comic opera in three acts by Bohuslav Martinů, with an Italian-language libretto by the composer after Carlo Goldoni's 1751 comedy The Mistress of the Inn (La locandiera). The opera, incorporating stretches of spoken dialogue between the characters against an orchestral background, was premiered on 17 May 1959 (shortly before the composer's death) at the Prague National Theatre, Czechoslovakia, when it was conducted by Václav Kašlik.

David Pountney has described the opera as "the work where Martinů's strain of fast-moving, neo-Classical style comes into its own... finding room for witty and ironic musical references to Italian madrigals, French vaudeville and Italian opera buffa". Martinů's biographer Brian Large noted several highlights from the score: a coloratura aria in Act 1 Scene 6 for Mirandolina as well as waltzes, intermezzos and a saltarello, the latter having been recorded in 1973 by the Czech State Philharmonic Orchestra Brno conducted by František Jílek.

The opera was the second musical adaptation of Goldoni's play, the first being a dramma giocoso by Antonio Salieri which premiered at the Vienna Kärtnertortheater in 1773.

== Performance and recording history ==
The first production of Mirandolina remained in the stage repertoire at the Prague National Theatre until 1963 and the opera was revived there in 1980–82. It was staged in 2002 by the Belarus National Philharmonic Orchestra as part of the Wexford Festival, with Daniela Bruera in the title role and conducted by Riccardo Frizza; this production was recorded by the BBC and published on CD in 2004 by Supraphon.

The UK premiere was given by Garsington Opera in 2009 with Juanita Lascarro in the title role, and conducted by Martin André.

In 2013–14, Mirandolina was seen at the National Moravian-Silesian Theatre in Ostrava. The German premiere of the original Italian version was then given in March 2014 at the Theater Gießen, conducted by Michael Hofstetter and directed by Andriy Zholdak; the Bavarian State Opera's Opernstudio performed the work in April 2014, conducted by Alexander Prior and directed by Christian Stückl, and in June it was staged at the Slovak National Theatre in Bratislava.

== Roles ==
Role	Voice type	Premiere cast 17 May 1959 (Conductor: Václav Kašlík)
Mirandolina, an inn-keeper	soprano	Maria Tauberová
Ortensia, an actress	soprano	Jaroslava Procházková
Dejanira, an actress	contralto	Štěpánka Štěpánová
Conte d'Albafiorita	tenor	Oldřich Kovář
Cavaliere di Ripafratta	bass	Přemysl Kočí
Marchese di Forlimpopoli	bass	Jaroslav Horáček
Fabrizio, a waiter	tenor	Ivo Žídek
a servant to the Cavaliere di Ripafratta	tenor	

== Synopsis ==
Mirandolina the inn-keeper is courted by various noblemen at her house in Florence. Two of them, Forlimpopoli and Albafiorita, try to vie with each other to seduce her, declaring that they are passionately in love with her, but having enchanted them she drops them. Another admirer is the sardonic misogynist Ripafratta, whom she sees as a challenge to win.

Mirandolina therefore decides to lure Ripafratta and seduce him. She sets out the tricks she is playing with Forlimpopoli and Albafiorita, and tries to use flattery and charm to gull Ripafratta. He however, becomes serious, playing on his rank and flushed with his first real love, and is furious when Mirandolina rejects him. Two elderly actresses, Ortensia and Dejanira pretend in vain that they are not upper class.

Mirandolina had all along been keen on her faithful waiter Fabrizio and ends up marrying him, having tested his fidelity, as a protection against the livid Ripafratta.
