= Ferdinand Rebay =

Austrian composer, music teacher, choir director and pianist

Ferdinand Rebay (11 June 1880 – 6 November 1953) was an Austrian composer, music teacher, choir director, and pianist.

== Biography ==
=== Early years ===
His father, also named Ferdinand Rebay (1851–1914), was an Austrian singer, writer, and composer, and was partner with Adolf Robitschek in the Vienna publishing firm Rebay & Robitschek.

In 1890, at the age of ten, young Ferdinand Rebay became a chorister at Heiligenkreuz Abbey, south of Vienna. Over the next five years he received a thorough musical education and became a solo alto.

In 1901 he joined Joseph Hofmann's piano class at the Vienna Conservatory (today's Universität für Musik und darstellende Kunst). He then studied composition at the Vienna Conservatory (of the Society for the Friends of Music) with Robert Fuchs, and also studied with Josef Wöss and Eusebius Mandyczewski.

In 1904 he concluded his studies, with his final academic work, Erlkönig, for large orchestra, which Fuchs labelled the finest work to have been produced in his 29 years at the Conservatory. During his studies with Fuchs, Rebay was awarded a number of prizes, including the Brahms Prize and a Silver Medal from the Gesellschaft der Musikfreunde.

=== Professional career ===
After graduating in 1904, Rebay became choir master of the Wiener Chorvereins. Some years later, in 1915, he took on the same rôle with the Wiener Schubertbund, remaining in the post until 1920, when he was appointed to the Vienna Music Academy. He was also a private piano and theory teacher and instructor at the Schwender piano school. In addition, he made piano reductions for Breitkopf & Härtel, Universal Edition, Schott (Korngold operas).

From 1921 he was instructor for piano and singing at the academy, now University, of Music and Performing Arts in Vienna (also known as the Vienna Music Academy). Among his notable pupils was soprano Maria Tauberová. In 1929 he became professor for didactic methods, pedagogical literature, and in 1933 member of the disciplinary commission. In 1938 his contract was not renewed, and only in 1945 was he able to resume teaching at the academy. He retired in 1946, and died in poverty and obscurity on 6 November 1953 in Vienna. A part of the musical estate of Rebay is in the music library of the convent Heiligenkreuz.

=== Music ===
- Sonata in c for Violin and Guitar (year unknown)
- Sonata in e for Violin and Guitar (year unknown)
- Sonata in d for Viola and Guitar (year unknown)
- Sonata in a for Guitar solo (year unknown)
