= Jadwiga Wysoczanská =

Czech opera singer (1927–2021)

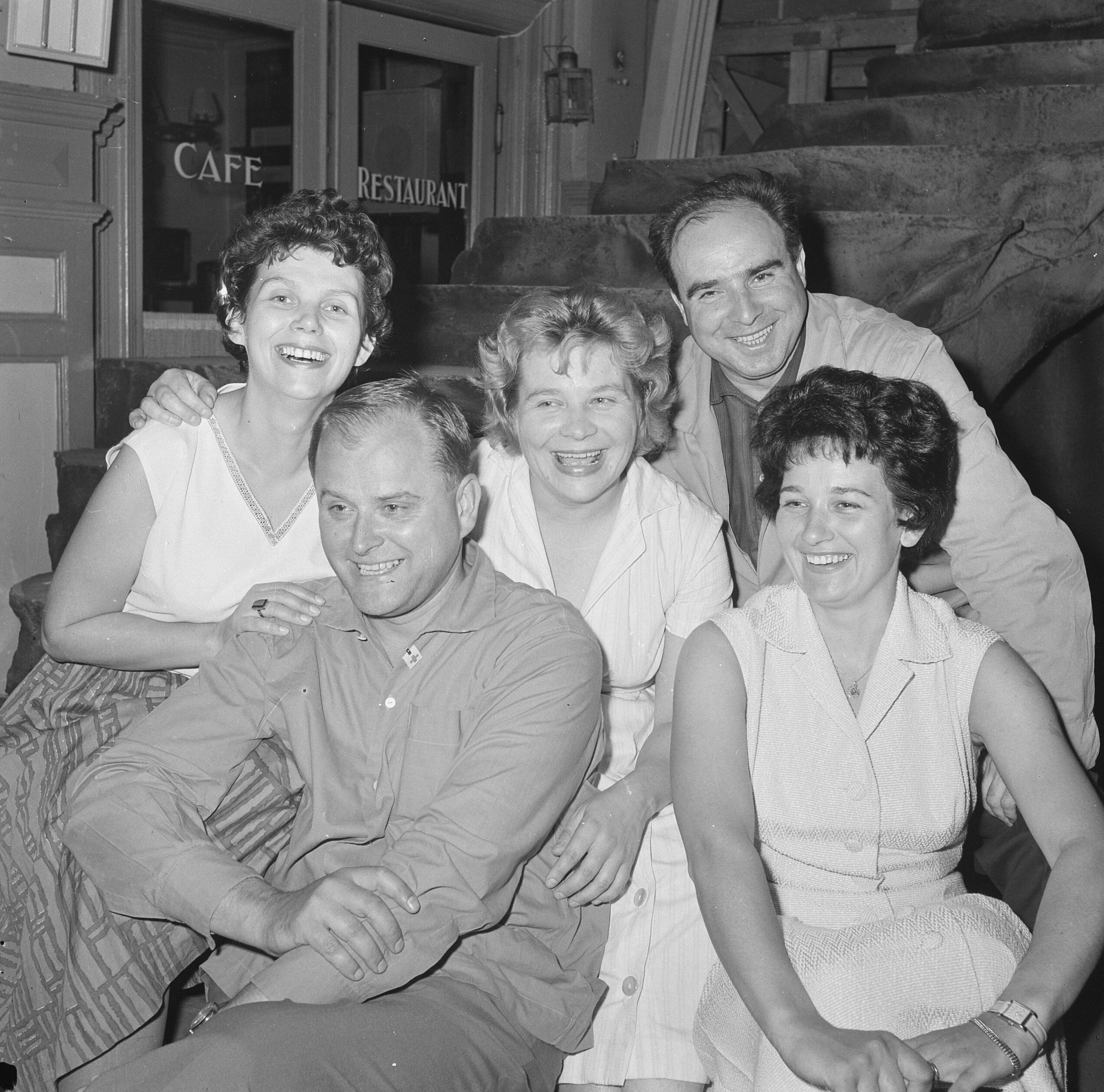
- Back row: Jadwiga Wysoczanská, Annie Delorie, Václav Kašlík. Front row: Ivo Žídek, Ivana Mixová (?) in 1963
- Born: 24 May 1927; Prague, Czechoslovakia
- Died: 31 March 2021 (aged 93); Prague, Czech Republic
- Occupation: Operatic soprano

Jadwiga Wysoczanská-Štrosová (24 May 1927 – 31 March 2021) was a Czech operatic soprano. She was a soloist of the National Theatre in Prague.

== Life ==
Born Jadwiga Wysoczanská in Prague, she became a soloist at the National Theatre in 1960, where she performed the title roles of Smetana's Libuše, Dvořák's Rusalka, Verdi's Aida, and leading roles such as Donna Anna in Mozart's Don Giovanni and Tatiana in Tchaikovsky's Eugene Onegin. She took part in a 1961 recording of Rusalka, as Woodsprite I.

Wysoczanská died in Prague on 31 March 2021, aged 93.
