= Maria Tauberová =

Czech opera singer (1911–2003)

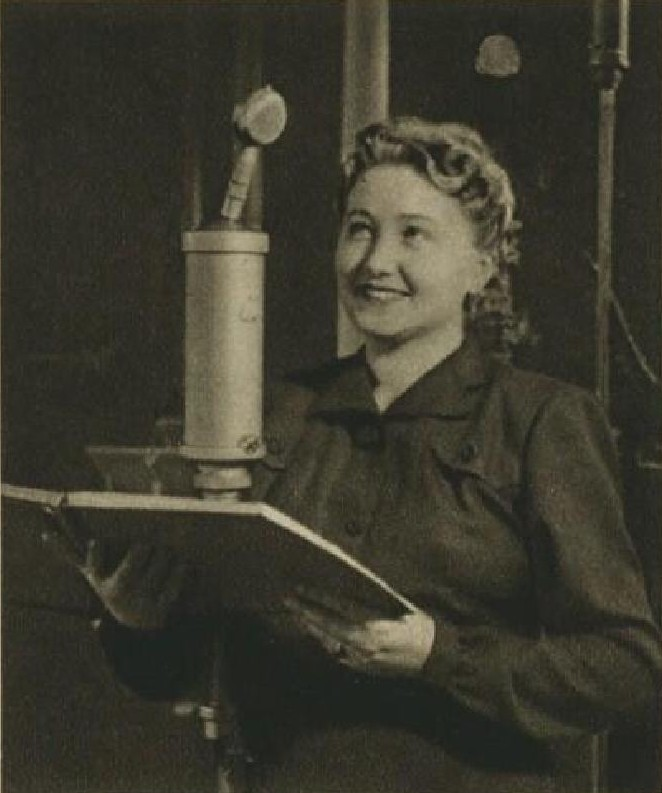
Maria Tauberová

Maria Tauberová (née Proskeová; 28 April 1911 – 16 January 2003) was a Czech opera singer who had an active international career from the 1930s through the 1970s. A lyric coloratura soprano with an excellent technique, she possessed a warm bright voice that was even in all registers. She was particularly admired for her portrayal of Mozart heroines. In addition to an almost four-decade career at the Prague National Theatre, she sang throughout Europe and in South America, frequently with her husband, conductor Jaroslav Krombholc.

== Biography ==
Born in Vysoké Mýto, Tauberová moved with her family to Vienna at the age of 9. She entered the Vienna Music Academy where she initially studied piano and then singing with Ferdinand Rebay. She later pursued further vocal training in Milan with Fernando Carpi in 1934. She began her career in Vienna, portraying the title role in Fritz Kreisler's operetta Sissy for a total of 360 performances.

In 1936 Tauberová made her débuts in Plzeň and then at the National Theatre in Prague, where she continued to sing until 1973. She made her debut with the company as Gilda in Rigoletto. Among her signature roles at the house were Susanna in The Marriage of Figaro, Despina in Così fan tutte, Zerlina in Don Giovanni, Eurydice in Talich’s interpretation of Christoph Willibald Gluck’s Orfeo ed Euridice, Marguerite in Faust, Zerbinetta in Ariadne auf Naxos, Olympia in Les contes d'Hoffmann, Rosina in The Barber of Seville, and Violetta in La traviata. In the Czech repertoire she was admired for her portrayals of Karolina in The Two Widows and the title roles in The Cunning Little Vixen, Mirandolina, and Julietta. She made a number of recordings with the National Theatre on the Supraphon label.

In 1937-1938 Tauberová was a guest at the Opéra de Monte-Carlo and in the late 1930s and 1940s she made appearances at the Grand Théâtre de Genève, the Lausanne Opera, Den Norske Opera, the Royal Opera House in London and the Berlin State Opera. In 1946 she and her husband were committed to the Teatro Municipal in Rio de Janeiro. In 1970 she sang at the Edinburgh Festival with the Prague National Theater. In 1957 she toured Russia with the Czech Philharmonic Orchestra. Throughout her career she was a frequent guest artist at the Vienna State Opera and at the opera houses in Budapest, Bucharest, and Sofia.

In 1994 she was honored with a Thalia Award. She died in Prague in 2003.
