= Valiano Natali =

Italian opera singer (1918–2000)

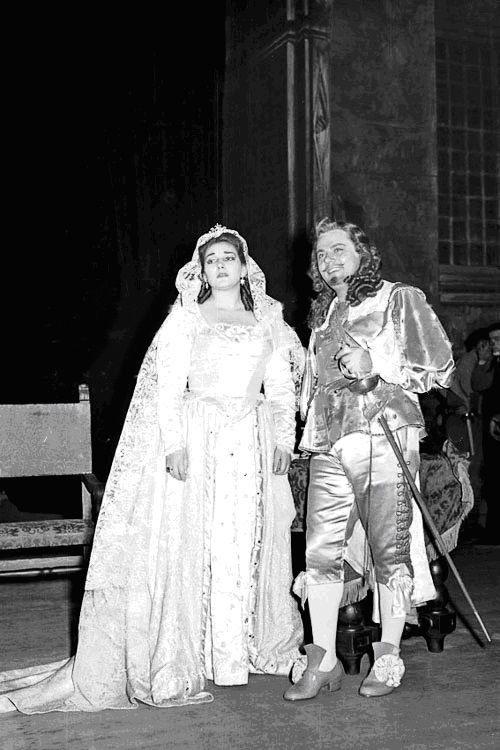
- Valiano Natali with Maria Callas, rehearsal of Lucia di Lammermoor, Teatro del Maggio Musicale, Florence, 1953
- Born: 9 December 1918; Agliana, Pistoia Italy
- Died: 30 March 2000 (aged 81); Pietrasanta, Lucca, Italy
- Occupation: Opera singer (tenor)
- Years active: 1950–1980
- Known for: Lucia di Lammermoor 1953, with Maria Callas.
- Spouse: Maresca Bacci (m. 1942)

Valiano Natali (9 December 1918 – 30 March 2000) was an Italian operatic tenor.

== Biography ==
Valiano was the son of Guido and Giovanna Lunardi; he was born in Agliana, a suburb of the Tuscan city of Pistoia, but relocated with his family to nearby Prato at the age of seven.

=== Singing career ===
Natali started his singing career as an Italian pop singer. Due to his vocal talent, he first got noticed at the fashionable nightlife spot Caffè Margherita, in Viareggio, during a singing festival. In the same seaside resort town, he met Maresca Bacci, a Florentine girl who was to become his inseparable life companion. They moved to Florence and married in 1942.

After World War II. Natali, who had meanwhile embraced opera, won a contest at the world-famous Maggio Musicale Fiorentino, launching a brilliant career as a tenor that would soon bring him to sing in all the major theatres next to the great opera protagonists of the time, like Mario Del Monaco, Giuseppe Di Stefano, Tito Gobbi and Maria Callas.

With Callas and Di Stefano, in 1953, at Teatro Comunale in Florence, Natali sang the part of Arturo in Lucia di Lammermoor, directed by maestro Franco Ghione. During the same year, again with Callas and Di Stefano, Natali recorded the opera, directed by maestro Tullio Serafin, in one of the most unforgettable recordings of Donizetti's masterpiece, which has been remastered and been part of opera lovers' collections to this day.

In 1955, the tenor took on the role of Cassius in Otello by Giuseppe Verdi at Teatro Carlo Felice di Genova. In 1956 he was in the cast of Macbeth at the Opera di Roma.

At the peak of his career, when he was sought by the main national and international opera productions, a serious car accident forced Natali to stop for months. When he recovered, he was left limping for life. Due to his condition, he had to fall back to singing secondary parts. Despite this, he continued to be active until with the Teatro Comunale, Florence. Here he continued to take part in representations of operas until the late 1970s, for instance, he was part of the cast of the Un ballo in Maschera, by Giuseppe Verdi, for the seasons of 1965–66, 1971–72 and 1973–74, this last under the direction of maestro Riccardo Muti.

=== Late career ===
Once left the stage Natali moved to Torre del Lago Puccini in 1982, dedicating his talent to vocal teaching and joining the board of directors of the renowned Puccini Festival, that the city holds every year. Among his notable students were Italian tenor Sauro Casseri, from Agliana, and soprano Mimma Briganti, from Versilia, who studied with Natali from 1985 to 1992.

== Death ==
Natali died of a heart attack in Pietrasanta, on 30 March 2000 . His tomb is in the cemetery of Campi Bisenzio, where he rests beside his wife Maresca, who died a few years before him.

== Discography ==
| Year | Recording | Main artist | Role |
|---|---|---|---|
| 2010 | Best Callas 50 | Maria Callas | Tenor (Vocal) |
| 2009 | Donizetti: Lucia di Lammermoor | Maria Callas | Tenor (Vocal) |
| 2009 | Maria Callas: Her Greatest Operas | Maria Callas | Tenor (Vocal) |
| 2008 | Giacomo Puccini: La fanciulla del West | Dimitri Mitropoulos | Vocals |
| 2007 | Donizetti: Lucia di Lammermoor | Maria Callas / Tullio Serafin | Vocals |
| 2007 | Maria Callas, The Complete Studio Recordings 1949–1969 | Maria Callas | Vocals |
| 2006 | Maria Callas 100 Best Classics | Maria Callas | Tenor (Vocal) |
| 2005 | Spanish Divas | | Vocals |
| 2005 | Tchaikovsky: La Dama di Picche | Artur Rodziński | Vocals |
| 2004 | Gaspare Spontini: Agnes di Hohenstaufen | Franco Corelli / Vittorio Gui | Vocals |
| 2004 | Giordano: Andrea Chenier | Giuseppe di Stefano | Vocals |
| 2002 | Meyerbeer: Roberto il diavolo | Nino Sanzogno | Vocals |
| 2002 | Rossini: La Gazza Ladra | Bruno Bartoletti / Gino Orlandini/ Flora Rafanelli / Cesare Valletti | Vocals |
| 2001 | Cherubini: Gli Abencerragi | Carlo Maria Giulini | Vocals |
| 1999 | Verdi: Il Trovatore | Montserrat Caballé / Thomas Schippers / Richard Tucker | Vocals |
| 1989 | Donizetti: Lucia di Lammermoor | Maria Callas | Vocals |
| | Bellini: I Puritani | | Vocals |
| | Donizetti: Lucia di Lammermoor | Maria Callas | Tenor (Vocal) |
| | Donizetti: Lucia di Lammermoor | Maria Callas | Vocals |
| | Donizetti: Lucia di Lammermoor | Maria Callas | Vocals |
| | Richard Tucker-The American Tenor | Richard Tucker | Vocals |
