= Félicien Mallefille =

French novelist and playwright

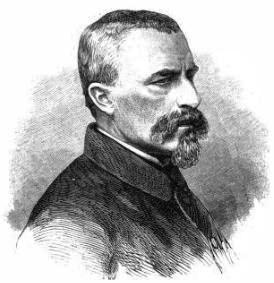
Jean Pierre Félicien Mallefille

Jean Pierre Félicien Mallefille (May 3, 1813 – November 24, 1868) was a French novelist and playwright.

Mallefille was born in Mauritius. He wrote a number of plays, including Glenarvon (1835), Les sept enfants de Lara (1836), Le cœur et la dot (1852), and Les sceptiques (1867), as well as two comedies, and two novels, Le collier (1845) and La confession du Gaucho (1868). A farce of his, Les deux veuves, later formed the basis of the libretto for Bedřich Smetana's opera The Two Widows.

He also wrote a scenario in French that was to have been the basis of a libretto for the opera Sardanapalo by Franz Liszt, but delivered it so late that Liszt, angered at his unreliability, had commissioned an Italian libretto from another writer; in the end the opera was never completed.

Mallefille also had a relationship with George Sand.

== In film ==
Mallefille is portrayed by Georges Corraface in James Lapine’s 1991 British-American film Impromptu.
