= Impromptu (1991 film) =

British film

- Theatrical release poster
- Directed by: James Lapine
- Written by: Sarah Kernochan
- Produced by: Stuart Oken; Daniel A. Sherkow
- Starring: Judy Davis; Hugh Grant; Mandy Patinkin; Bernadette Peters; Julian Sands; Ralph Brown; Georges Corraface; Anton Rodgers; Emma Thompson
- Cinematography: Bruno de Keyzer
- Edited by: Michael Ellis
- Music by: Frédéric Chopin; Franz Liszt; Ludwig van Beethoven
- Production company: Les Films Ariane
- Distributed by: Hemdale Film Corporation (United States); Rank Film Distributors (United Kingdom); Sovereign Pictures (Worldwide)
- Release date: April 12, 1991
- Running time: 91 minutes
- Countries: United Kingdom; United States
- Language: English
- Box office: $4.1 million

Impromptu is a 1991 period drama film directed by James Lapine, written by Sarah Kernochan, produced by Daniel A. Sherkow and Stuart Oken, and starring Hugh Grant as Frédéric Chopin and Judy Davis as George Sand. It was shot entirely on location in France as a British production by an American company. Its main filming location was at the Château des Briottières outside Angers, in the Loire Valley.

== Plot ==
Since getting divorced, having just completed her memoirs, Baroness Amantine-Lucile-Aurore Dupin (previously Baroness Dudevant, successful and notorious writer of sensational romance novels) has been living in Paris under the pseudonym George Sand. A driven and aggressive woman, who wears men's clothing, Sand has had a string of lovers, regularly discarded when she inevitably becomes bored with them. Her latest amorous pursuit is of the consumptive and sensitive brilliant composer, Frédéric Chopin, whose music she admired greatly before meeting him. Sand's friend, Countess Marie d'Agoult, the mistress of Chopin's friend, renowned composer Franz Liszt, advises Sand that to win the timid and frail Chopin she must act like a man pursuing a woman; like a woman, Chopin will eventually yield to the stronger personality. Knowing that aggression will repel Chopin, the jealous d'Agoult manipulates to impede a relationship between Chopin and Sand. D'Agoult resents Sand's having avoided the stigma she herself has suffered as Liszt's mistress.

Sand meets Chopin in 1836 in the French country house of the Duchess d'Antan, an aspiring socialite who wishes to create in the provinces a stylish salon frequented by the artistic elite. To the exasperation of her dim, hunting-obsessed husband, the duchess invites luminaries from Paris, including Chopin, Liszt, the writer Alfred de Musset, and painter Eugène Delacroix. Delacroix blatantly seduces the flattered duchess while painting her portrait. Perpetually lacking money, the luminaries accept the invitation to live in luxury without expense while just having to be "brilliant at dinner." Determined to meet Chopin, Sand brazenly invites herself and her children to the house party, unaware that two of her troublesome former lovers are also houseguests, de Musset and novelist Félicien Mallefille. Mallefille, her children's tutor, also came uninvited in pursuit of Sand. Encountering Sand after a riding accident, the duke is grateful to the "young lad" who performs the unpleasant task of shooting the duke's injured horse, only to subsequently find out that the "lad" was George Sand herself.

Sand writes a passionate love letter to the determinedly evasive Chopin, giving it to their mutual friend, d'Agoult, to deliver on her behalf. Tearing off Sand's signature, d'Agoult signs her own name to the letter. Chopin is alarmed, wary of being overwhelmed, particularly by his friend's lover.

The duchess so idolizes her illustrious guests that, emulating Sand, she dons her husband's clothes, completely oblivious to her guests' disdain of her fawning over them. Meanwhile, Sand puts on a dress in the colors of the Polish flag to get Chopin's attention. To provide entertainment in "gratitude" to their hosts, the luminaries stage a short play, written by de Musset, satirizing the aristocracy and specifically mocking their hosts. Chopin protests this breach of manners, while a prank instigated by Sand's children causes a fireplace explosion, injuring their hosts and adding injury to insult. Having overstayed their welcome, the guests leave.

Maliciously, d'Agoult falsely tells Chopin that Sand has made a wager for money that she can seduce him, making him even more resolved to avoid Sand, particularly after she declares her love to him. In her declaration, Sand recites a phrase from the letter to which d'Agoult signed her name. After buying a copy of Sand's memoir, Chopin finds the phrase from Sand's letter to him in the book, convincing him that Sand wrote the letter and exposing d'Agoult's treachery. Chopin tells the persistent Sand that his weak and failing body is detached from his spirit, resigned to its fate and unfit for an amorous relationship. Sand insists that she will bolster his health and resolve with her strength.

Having previously challenged erstwhile rival de Musset to a duel, Mallefille now challenges the bemused Chopin, who faints during the face-off. Grabbing Chopin's pistol, Sand shoots Mallefille, finishing the duel. Ignoring the wounded Mallefille, Sand nurses Chopin back to health, warming their relationship.

Ostensibly because d'Agoult brought them together, but vengefully, Sand convinces Chopin to dedicate his Études to d'Agoult. Inferring by the dedication that d'Agoult has had an affair with Chopin, Liszt quarrels with his mistress. Sand and Chopin depart for convalescence in Mallorca, relieved to escape the competitive nature of artistic alliances and jealousies in Paris.

== Cast ==
- Judy Davis as George Sand (Amantine-Lucile-Aurore Dupin)
- Hugh Grant as Frédéric Chopin
- Mandy Patinkin as Alfred de Musset
- Bernadette Peters as Marie Catherine Sophie, Comtesse d'Agoult
- Julian Sands as Franz Liszt
- Ralph Brown as Eugène Delacroix
- Georges Corraface as Felicien Mallefille
- Anton Rodgers as Duke d'Antan
- Emma Thompson as Duchess d'Antan
- Anna Massey as Sophie-Victorie Delaborde, George Sand's Mother

The film's supporting actors include David Birkin as Maurice, John Savident as Buloz, Lucy Speed as Young Aurore, and Elizabeth Spriggs as Baroness Laginsky.

== Production ==
Sarah Kernochan, director James Lapine's wife, had written the film in 1988 during a lay-off due to 1988 Writers Guild of America strike. Kernochan explained the film: "How do complicated people find a simple way of loving?" The producer Stuart Oken liked the project; his concern was to give Lapine "a chance to realise his vision and become a movie director." Oken brought the project to his friend and fellow producer, Dan Sherkow, who secured financing and distribution for the picture.

For the cast, Lapine wanted "to use people he had worked with before." He cast actors who "didn't look like the characters, yet embodied them." Judy Davis and Mandy Patinkin could "hardly look more unlike the cultural icons they portray." Lapine hired a piano coach and a music consultant to advise Grant and Sands on piano techniques.

Due to European Community legalities, the film was incorporated as a British production with co-production by the French company Les Films Ariane and distribution by the United States company Sovereign Pictures. The budget was $6 million.

== Music ==
=== Chopin ===
- Impromptu No. 1 in A-flat major (Op. 29)
- Ballade No. 1 in G minor (Op. 23)
- Polonaise in A major "Military" (Op. 40, No.1)
- Etude in E minor "Wrong Note" (Op. 25, No. 5)
- Prelude in G-sharp minor (Op. 28, No. 12)
- Prelude in D-flat major "Raindrop" (Op. 28, No. 15)
- Etude in G-flat major "Butterfly" (Op. 25, No. 9)
- Nouvelle Etude No. 1 in F minor
- Etude in C-sharp minor (Op. 10, No. 4)
- Waltz in D-flat major "Minute" (Op. 64, No. 1)
- Fantasy-Impromptu in C-sharp minor (Op. 66)
- Nocturne in F major (Op. 15, No. 1)
- Etude in A-flat major "Aeolian Harp" (Op. 25, No. 1)

=== Liszt ===
- Apres d'une lecture de Dante (from Années de Pèlerinage, 2nd year)
- Transcendental Etude No. 4 "Mazeppa"
- Grand galop chromatique

=== Beethoven ===
- Symphony No.6 in F major "Pastoral"

== Release, reception ==
Impromptu was released on 12 April 1991 in the United Kingdom. It was later broadcast on PBS's Masterpiece Theatre in 1993.

=== Critical reception ===
On Rotten Tomatoes, the film has an approval rating of 74% based on 19 reviews, with an average score of 6.1/10. Jeff Millar of the Houston Chronicle wrote that the film is "a zingy, impudent little essay on gender, with the exquisitely confusing George Sand at its center." Roger Ebert of the Chicago Sun-Times awarded the film 3/4 stars, writing, "The film has little serious interest in George Sand, and almost none in the novels that are all that remain of her, but diverts itself with scandal, atmosphere, location, and witty repartee."

Janet Maslin of The New York Times gave the film a positive review, likening it to the films of Ken Russell. Speaking of director James Lapine's approach, Maslin said, "Handling this material playfully, he tosses together the film's artistic luminaries and allows them to indulge in outrageous antics, like the scene that finds Sand pleading for Chopin's affections and telling him she needs only a minute of his time to explain her feelings." Terrence Rafferty wrote in The New Yorker that the film was "an ebullient and absurdly entertaining account of the famous love affair of George Sand and Frédéric Chopin. ...The historical figures in this movie are cartoons, but they’re cartoons with recognizable human qualities, and the actors look as if they were having a wonderful time charging around in their period costumes. Hugh Grant’s Chopin is a brilliant caricature of the Romantic ideal of the artist; he gives the character an air of befuddled unworldliness, and punctuates his readings with delicately timed tubercular coughs. Judy Davis plays Sand—a great actress in a great role."

=== Accolades ===
List of awards and nominations
Award	Category	Recipients	Result
Independent Spirit Awards	Best Female Lead	Judy Davis	Won
Independent Spirit Awards	Best Supporting Female	Emma Thompson	Nominated
