= Julietta (Martinů) =

Opera by Bohuslav Martinů

Julietta is an opera by Bohuslav Martinů, who also wrote the libretto, in French, based on the play Juliette ou la Clé des songes (Juliette, or The Key of Dreams) by the French author Georges Neveux. A libretto in Czech was later prepared for its premiere which took place at the Prague National Theatre on 16 March 1938. Julietta has become widely considered as Martinů's masterpiece.

== Performance history ==
Martinů became aware of the play by Neveux in 1932, two years after its premiere at the Théâtre de l'Avenue in Paris (8th arrondissement) on 7 March 1930. It appears that Neveux had come to an agreement with Kurt Weill to base a musical comedy on his play, but on hearing some of Martinů's music, passed his favour to the Czech. The initial work on the opera was undertaken to French words, but a Czech version was set between May 1936 and January 1937.

By the time of its premiere Martinů had written eight operas in a variety of styles. The work received its first performance at Prague National Theatre on 16 March 1938 (as Julietta aneb Snář), with Václav Talich conducting, a few months before Martinů made his last visit to his country of birth. From Paris he wrote to Talich expressing his deep thanks to the conductor for his "understanding" which "showed all who worked with you the right path". Neveux had also been present at the premiere, adjudging the setting better than his prose original. Subsequently, the opera has only been intermittently performed at that house; new productions were mounted in 1963 and 1989, and an Opera North production was seen three times in 2000; in March 2016 a new production was premiered at the theatre.

The composer was present at the German premiere in Wiesbaden in January 1956. A production by the Bielefeld Opera in Germany conducted by Geoffrey Moull received eight performances in 1992. In France, a radio broadcast in 1962 was conducted by Charles Bruck, while the stage premiere was at the Grand Théâtre in Angers in 1970.

The UK premiere was given in April 1978 in London by the New Opera Company at the London Coliseum, conducted by Charles Mackerras in an English translation by Brian Large, with Joy Roberts and Stuart Kale in the principal roles, and it was revived by English National Opera in the following season. There was a production by the Guildhall School of Music and Drama in 1987 conducted by Howard Williams, with the title role shared between Juliet Booth and Sarah Pring. Following a performance at the Edinburgh Festival by a visiting Slovak company in 1990, the next UK production was by Opera North in 1997, with Rebecca Caine and Paul Nilon. A production by Richard Jones in Paris in 2002 was revived by English National Opera in September/October 2012 to enthusiastic reviews overall.

Germany's Theater Bremen staged a new production opening on 29 March 2014 under the direction of John Fulljames. Andreas Homoki and Fabio Luisi mounted a new production at Opernhaus Zürich with Joseph Kaiser as Michel in 2015 and the Berlin Staatsoper premiered a new production on 28 May 2016 at its temporary Schiller Theater home, with Daniel Barenboim conducting, Claus Guth directing, Magdalena Kožená as Julietta and Rolando Villazón as Michel.

The opera was one of the composer's favourite works, and he incorporated a few bars from it in his last symphony in 1953.

James Helmes Sutcliffe remarked in Opera News on "Martinů's beautiful score" and on his "lyrical, atmospheric music". Hindle and Godsil have published a psychoanalytical study of the opera and analysed the work in the context of Martinů's life.

The opera was revived at the Prague National Theatre on 16 March 2018, the 80th anniversary of its premiere. This was accompanied by a month-long exhibition to mark the occasion.

== Music ==
Martinů's setting of his libretto is primarily lyrical although there are no extended solo arias. The "extended diatonicism" of the composer's mature works features along with "motoric rhythms found in his Double Concerto of 1938, especially where the plot moves rapidly forward. There are two principal roles: Julietta (soprano) and Michel (tenor).

Jan Smaczny observes that the ability of the composer to characterize, honed as an observer of small-town life when a child living in the Polička clock tower offers a sequence of "sharply painted tableaux" with a "carnival of caricatures", both comic and poignant. For the singers, there is the factor that significant sections of the piece are dialogue rather than singing, although Martinů's experience in a variety of theatre works before this, his ninth opera, allows him to weave the spoken words as an integral part of the impact of the opera, "distancing the audience from the often dreamlike quality of the musical fabric". A snatch of melody on an off-stage accordion, and a melodic fragment which symbolizes longing are introduced at key moments in the score. Smaczny comments that "suggestion is everything in this score, and Martinů is astonishingly successful at stimulating the imagination often with breathtaking economy".

== Orchestral suite ==
Martinů began to prepare a concert work from the opera, "Three Fragments from Juliette", with changes to the original vocal lines, after the opera's premiere, after his return to Paris. However, the outbreak of World War II interrupted his work, and his own labours on this composition continued until his death in 1959. The score was lost after Martinů's death, until 2002, when Aleš Březina discovered the piano reduction of the score among a private collection of papers. After Březina returned to Prague to have this adapted into a full orchestral score, the Czech publishing firm DILIA revealed that a full score already existed in their archives. Sir Charles Mackerras conducted the world premiere of the "Three Fragments from Juliette" with the Czech Philharmonic Orchestra in December 2008.

Another Julietta suite, created by Zbynĕk Vostĕk, was recorded by Supraphon and issued with orchestral movements from other operatic works by the composer.

== Roles ==
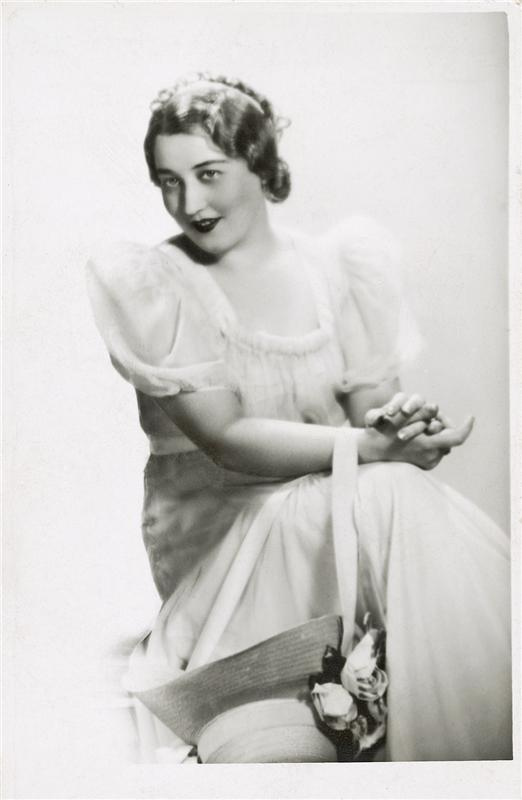
Ota Horáková as Julietta

Roles, voice types, premiere cast
Role	Voice type	Premiere cast, 16 March 1938 Conductor: Václav Talich
Julietta	soprano	Ota Horáková
Michel	tenor	Jaroslav Gleich
Small Arab	mezzo-soprano	Štěpánka Štěpánová
Old Arab	bass	Luděk Mandaus
Woman selling birds and poultry	mezzo-soprano	Ema Miřiovská
Woman selling fish	soprano	Marie Pixová
The man with the helmet	baritone	Zdeněk Otava
Police officer	tenor	Karel Hruška
Three gentlemen	sopranos	Marie Budíková, Anna Kejřová, Anna Petridesová
Grandfather Youth	bass	Josef Celerin
Grandfather	bass	Josef Křikava
Grandmother	contralto	Marie Veselá
Fortune teller	contralto	Marie Podvalová
The seller of memories	bass-baritone	Jan Konstantin
The old sailor	bass	Josef Munclinger
The young sailor	tenor	Josef Vojta
The old lady	mezzo-soprano	Božena Kozlíková
The forest guard	tenor	Karel Hruška
The messenger	soprano	Táňa Tomanová
The official	tenor	Miloslav Jeník
The beggar	bass-baritone	Stanislav Muž
The convict	bass	Luděk Mandaus
The railway engineer	tenor	Josef Vojta
The nightwatchman	bass	Hanuš Thein
Chorus: Townspeople; a group of grey figures.

== Synopsis ==
=== Act 1 ===
Michel, a traveling bookseller from Paris, finds himself in a seaside town in search of a girl whose voice has haunted him since first hearing it three years before. From the following scenes with various townspeople, it emerges that none of them can remember more than a few minutes, which is confirmed by a police officer. The policeman asks Michel what his oldest memory is – a toy duck. Because of his long memory the townsfolk nominate him as town captain, and the officer departs to prepare for his inauguration. As Michel (with just piano accompaniment) tells some townspeople of how he came to fall in love with the voice of the unknown girl, the voice of Julietta is heard and after her song she asks him to meet her later in the woods. The policeman returns as a postman with no recollection of his meeting with Michel.

=== Act 2 ===
At a crossroads in the woods near a fountain, various people enter, all showing a lack of memory, including a fortune teller who forewarns Michel of something. When Julietta arrives she conjures a world of romantic fantasy and asks him to tell her of their (non-existent) past love. A peddlar comes by selling wares in which Julietta sees her past with Michel. She runs into the woods and Michel fires a shot at which the townspeople rush in to arrest him. He diverts them by telling them stories and they forget their intention to execute him and wander away. Back in the town square Michel locates Julietta's house, but an old woman says that she lives alone. He hears Julietta's song again, but decides to embark on a ship and leave.

=== Act 3 ===
At the Central Bureau of Dreams several dreamers (the messenger, the beggar, the convict, the railway engineer) come to ask for their fantasy dream. Michel is warned that if he returns to his dream and does not wake up, he will be imprisoned in the dream-world forever. Ready to leave his dream, he hears Julietta's voice calling him and despite the nightwatchman's warning declares that he will stay with her. The setting and townsfolk from the start of the opera returns, and Michel remains in the dream-world.

== Recordings ==
- Le Chant du Monde (1962, live in Paris): Andrée Esposito (Julietta), Jean Giraudeau (Michel), Orchestre lyrique de l'ORTF conducted by Charles Bruck
- Supraphon (1964) SU 3626-2 612: Maria Tauberová (Julietta), Ivo Žídek (Michel), Orchestra and Chorus of the Prague National Theatre; Jaroslav Krombholc, conductor, with Antonín Zlesák, Zdeněk Otava
- ORF (2002, live at Bregenz): Eva-Maria Westbroek (Julietta), Johannes Chum (Michel), Vienna Symphony Orchestra conducted by Dietfried Bernet
- Oehms Classics (2014 live, Frankfurt): Juanita Lascarro (Julietta), Kurt Streit (Michel), Frankfurt Opera conducted by Sebastian Weigle
