= Josef Schreiber =

German soldier and Knight's Cross recipient (1919-?)

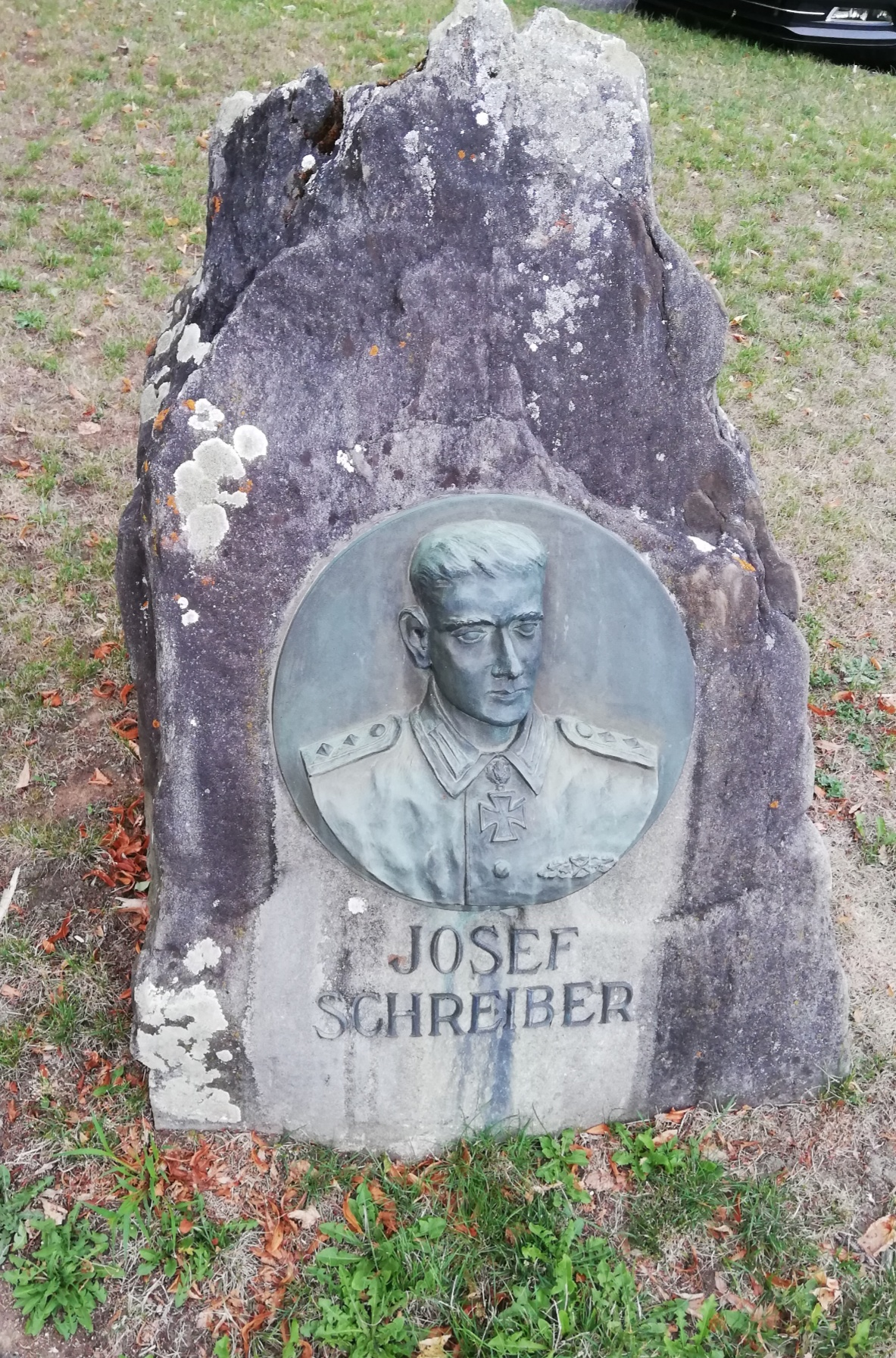
- Memorial stone at the Oberfeldwebel-Schreiber barracks in Immendingen
- Born: 24 December 1919; Mindersdorf/Baden
- Died: 1 February 1945 (aged 25) M.I.A; Disappeared near Poznań
- Military career
- Allegiance: Nazi Germany
- Branch: Heer
- Service years: 1938–1945
- Rank: Leutnant
- Unit: 14th Infantry Regiment
- Conflicts: World War II
- Awards: Knight's Cross of the Iron Cross with Oak Leaves

Josef Schreiber (24 December 1919 – missing as of 1 February 1945) was an Oberfeldwebel in the Wehrmacht during World War II. He was the namesake of the Oberfeldwebel-Schreiber barracks in Immendingen which was closed in March 2016.

== Biography ==
Josef Schreiber was born on 24 December 1919 to August Schreiber, a master saddler, and his second wife Josefine, together the family ran a farm. Josef Schreiber had completed secondary school and his compulsory labor service in the RAD when he volunteered for service in the German Army on 14 August 1938.

His first posting was with the 7th company of the 14th Infantry Regiment based in the city of Konstanz. He was promoted to the rank of Unteroffizier on 11 October 1940. During early phase of Operation Barbarossa Schreier temporarily took command of a platoon and helped to repel a Soviet counterattack, for this action he was awarded the Iron Cross 1st Class on 18 September 1941.

He remained a platoon leader with the 4th company of the 14th Infantry Regiment and on 31 March 1943 was awarded the Knight's Cross for leadership during a battle north of Orel. During the battle two platoons under his command successfully defended a hill overlooking the area from a strong Soviet attack.

On 1 July 1941 he was promoted to the rank of Oberfeldwebel and returned the 7th company on 14 August 1943 in anticipation of Operation Citadel. He was eventually given command of the 7th company after the former company commander was killed although by this point the unit only number 30 men. He was eventually reassigned back to the 4th company and placed in command of one platoon and he and his men succeeded in halting Soviet advance that had broken through German lines. For this, he was awarded the Oak Leaves to the Knight's Cross of the Iron Cross on 5 October 1943.

At the end of 1944 Schreiber was assigned to Kriegsschule V in Posen as an instructor. Schreiber, along with the nearly 2,000 officer candidates at the school, was eventually sent to the front to try and stop the Soviet advance. On 1 February 1945 Schreiber was listed as missing in action during the fighting around Posen, he was posthumously promoted to the rank of Lieutenant in the Replacement Army.

== Bundeswehr's role model ==
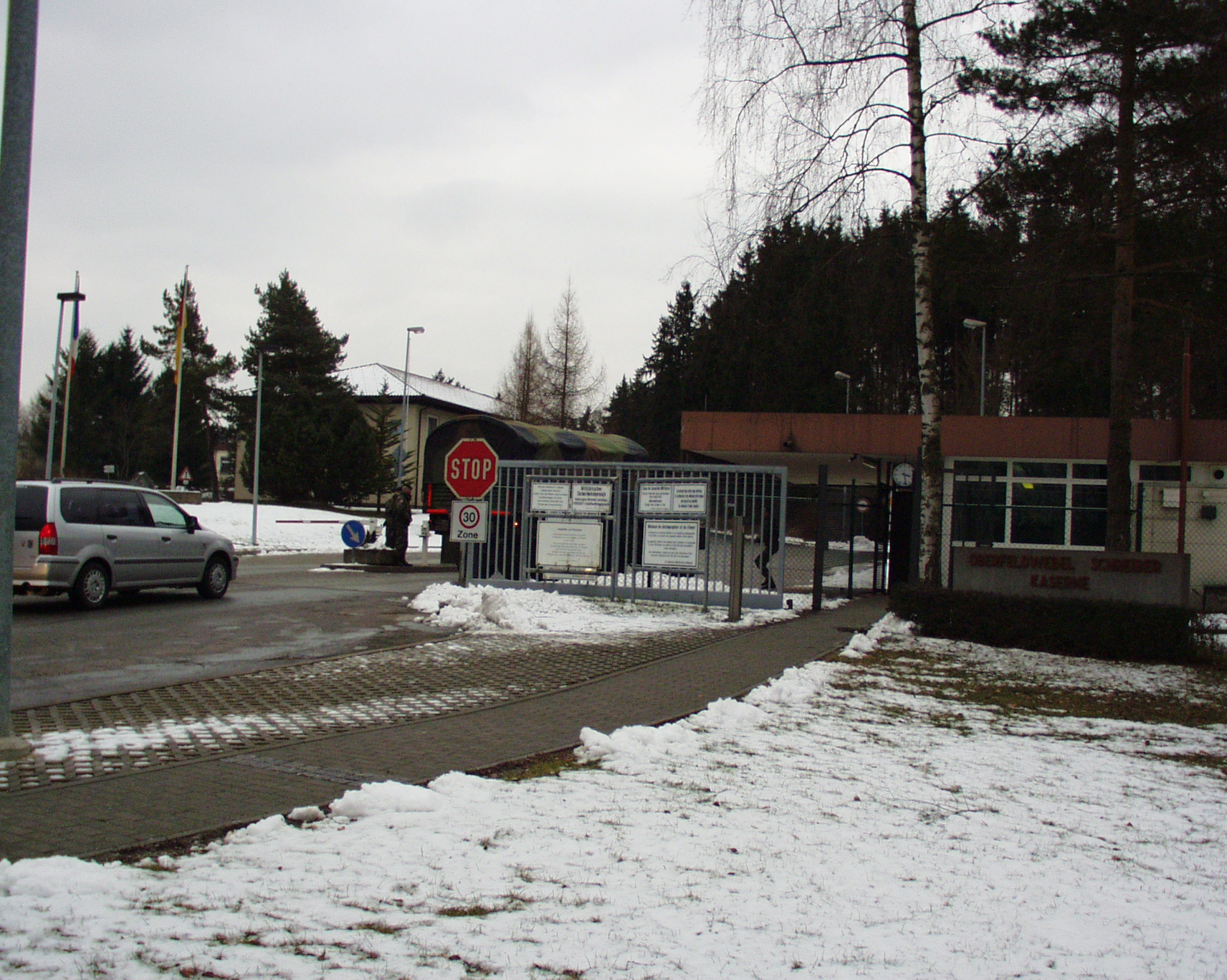
Oberfeldwebel-Schreiber barracks

His actions leading to the presentations of Knight's Cross of the Iron Cross with Oak Leaves (Ritterkreuz des Eisernen Kreuzes mit Eichenlaub) made him a role model in the Bundeswehr. During Operation Citadel, on his own initiative, he led an attack against Soviet trenches, forcing the enemy to retreat. In August 1943, supported by 30 soldiers, he again forced the Soviets to retreat at Karachev. On 27 May 1967, the Bundeswehr named the barracks at Immendingen the Oberfeldwebel-Schreiber barracks.

== Awards and decorations ==
- Infantry Assault Badge (16 August 1941)
- Iron Cross (1939)
  - 2nd Class (10 September 1941)
  - 1st Class (18 September 1941)
- Knight's Cross of the Iron Cross with Oak Leaves
  - Knight's Cross on 31 March 1943 as Feldwebel and Zugführer (platoon leader) in the 4./Sturm-Regiment 14
  - 309th Oak Leaves on 5 October 1943 as Oberfeldwebel and Zugführer (platoon leader) in the 7./Sturm-Regiment 14
- Close Combat Clasp
  - in Bronze (?)
  - in Silver (20 October 1943)
