= Peter Meven =

German opera singer

- Birth name: Franz Peter Meven
- Born: 1 October 1929 (age 95); Cologne, Germany
- Died: 30 August 2003 (aged 73); Waldorf, Germany
- Genres: Opera
- Occupation(s): Opera and concert singer

Franz Peter Meven (1 October 1929 in Cologne – 30 August 2003 in Waldorf near Blankenheim, North Rhine-Westphalia) was a German opera and concert singer (bass).

== Life ==
Meven began his career after studying sculpture with a theatre sculptor at the Cologne Opera. Due to his habit of singing at work, his beautiful bass caught the attention of a singer working there, who recommended him to take singing lessons. After private lessons with Felix Knäpper and Robert Blasius he completed his education at the Hochschule für Musik und Tanz Köln.

At the age of 21 and only just working as a theatre sculptor, he married Erika Meven, née Klöcker, in 1951; the marriage produced four daughters.

In 1958, Meven got his first engagement at the Stadttheater Hagen; from there his way led via Mainz and Wiesbaden to Düsseldorf, where he belonged to the ensemble of the Deutsche Oper am Rhein until 1994.

In addition, he has appeared on numerous guest tours to almost all renowned opera houses in the western hemisphere. His repertoire included all the great character roles of his vocal subject, as well as a multitude of oratorios and songs.

Meven's voice, as heard on numerous records and CD recordings, captivated with its enormous radiance, a full, almost hypnotic timbre and great flexibility. Perfect singing and speaking technique, high musicality and an intensive acting expression made him an exceptional artist.

Meven also found his expression in the visual arts: Parallel to his stage career, he devoted himself - albeit privately - to painting and sculpture.
