= Ivo Žídek =

Czech lyric tenor (1926–2003)

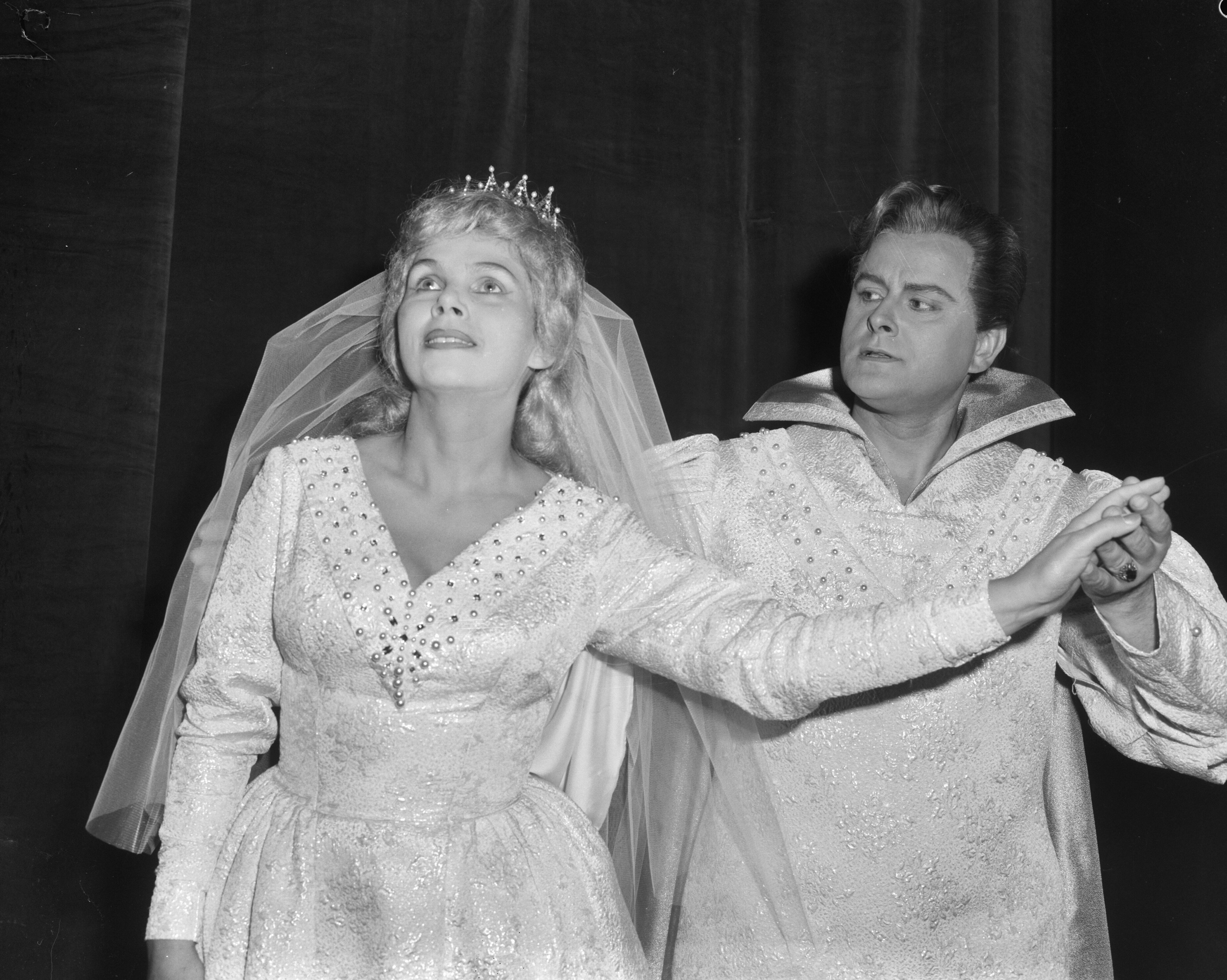
Žídek in 1963

Ivo Žídek (4 June 1926 – 19 May 2003) was a Czech lyric tenor. He was known for his vivid portrayals of character roles in the operas of Smetana, Dvořák and Janáček.

== Early life ==
Ivo Žídek was born on 4 June 1926 in Kravaře, Czechoslovakia. He was descended from a long family line of music teachers and cantors. His father, Libor Žídek, was also an actor and a singer. As a youth, he was schooled in Ostrava where he studied painting because the local music schools had been closed under the Nazi occupation. However, he studied voice privately with Rudolf Vašek (at first, as a baritone) and studied music theory with Josef Schreiber. He was invited by conductor Zdeněk Chalabala to sing with the opera company in Ostrava, making his debut in the title role of Jules Massenet's Werther" in 1944. He continued singing in Ostrava until 1948.

== National Theatre of Prague ==
In 1947, he was invited to Prague to appear as guest soloist with the National Theatre as Jeník in Bedřich Smetana's Prodaná nevěsta (The Bartered Bride) – a signature role he would repeat over 500 times – as well as parts in Smetana's Tajemství (The Secret) and Zdeněk Fibich's Bouře (The Tempest). The following year, he joined the national company as a principal soloist and remained there for the next 37 years.

At the National Theatre, Žídek became strongly associated with many of the lyric tenor roles in the Czech and Slovak operatic repertoire. His bright, youthful voice was ideally suited for the Prince in Antonín Dvořák's Rusalka. Over the years, he portrayed not only staple roles by Smetana, Dvořák, Janáček and Martinů but also characters in the operas of Fibich, Karel Kovařovic, Otakar Ostrčil, Eugen Suchoň and Ján Cikker.

Žídek sang numerous roles in the operas of Leoš Janáček: Steva and Laca in Její pastorkyňa (Jenůfa); the triple role of Mazal, Blankytný (Azurean in the English translation) and Petřík in Výlety páně Broučkovy (The Excursions of Mr. Brouček); Albert Gregor in Věc Makropulos (The Makropulos Case); and the lovesick murderer Skuratov in Z mrtvého domu (From the House of the Dead; this performance received the 1982 Grammy Award for Best Opera Recording), a role he reprised at the 1983 American (live) premiere of the opera with the New York Philharmonic.

In the operas of Bohuslav Martinů, Žídek was known for his portrayals of Michel in Julietta, Manolios in Řecké pašije (The Greek Passion) and Fabrizio in Mirandolina. Beyond his native repertoire, he was known for his portrayals of Tamino in The Magic Flute and Tom Rakewell in The Rake's Progress.

== International career ==
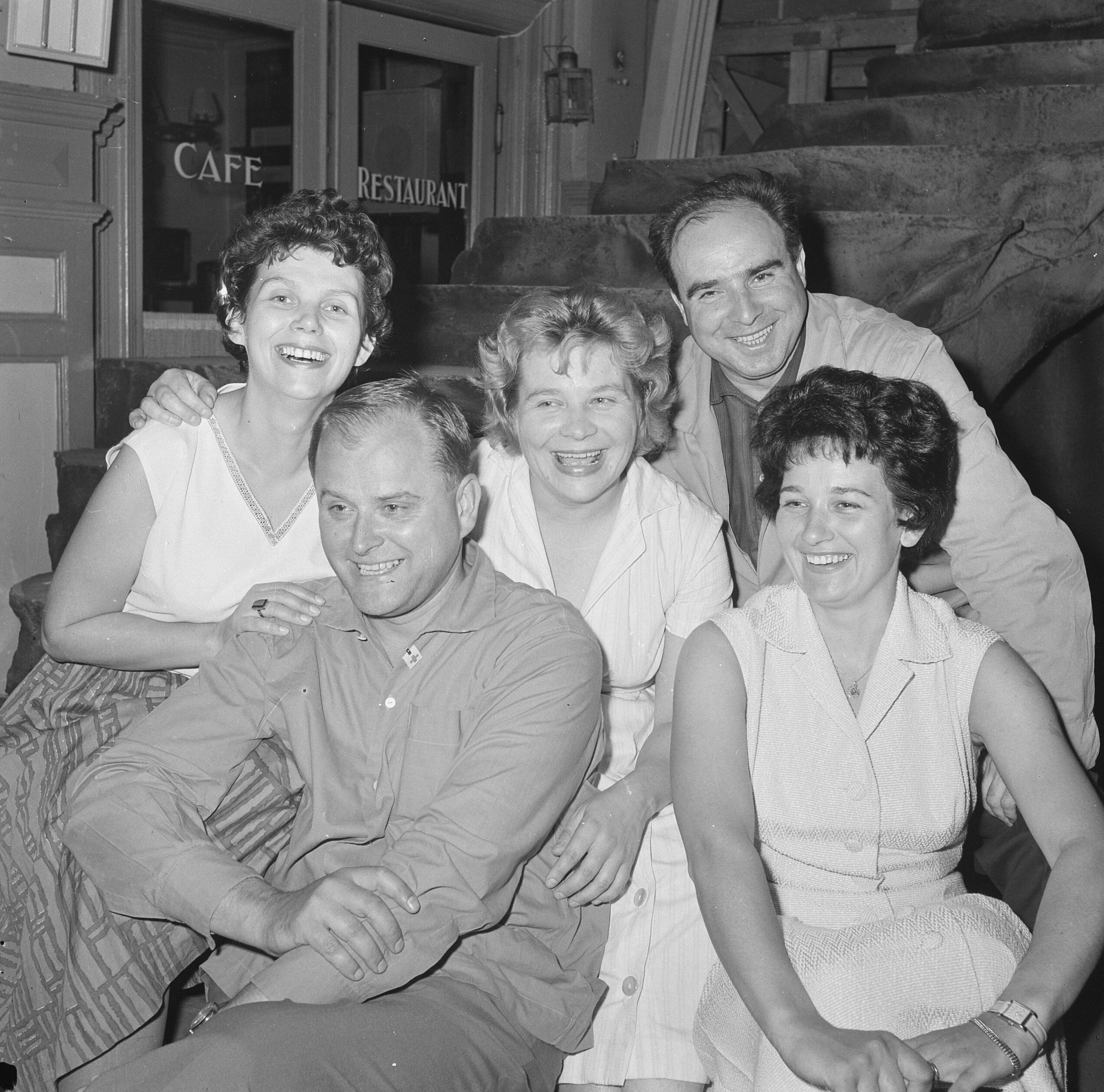
Back row (left to right): Jadwiga Wysoczanská, Annie Delorie, Václav Kašlík; Front row: Ivo Žídek, Ivana Mixová (1963)

Žídek was a welcome guest in foreign opera houses beginning early in his career. He sang at the Vienna State Opera from 1956 to 1971 and at the Deutsche Staatsoper in Berlin from 1954 to 1968. In addition, he appeared in other European opera houses, in South America and at the Wexford opera festival in Ireland.

During the Prague National Theatre's two residencies at the Edinburgh Festival in 1964 and 1970, the company mounted several acclaimed productions of Czech operas when Žídek and fellow company members Beno Blachut and Helena Tattermuschová were at the height of their powers. In 1964, he appeared as the Prince in Rusalka and Skuratov in the original version of From the House of the Dead; the latter production was recorded on Supraphon the following year under the direction of Bohumil Gregor. In 1970, he was Dalibor in Smetana's opera and again sang Jeník as well as roles in The Makropulos Case and The Excursions of Mr Brouček.

During the 1960s and early 1970s, Žídek and the Prague National Theatre recorded the entire catalogue of Janáček operas on the Supraphon label.

== Retirement and National Theatre directorship ==
Žídek was active as a singer into the 1980s. By then, his voice – which had never been a powerful one – had darkened and lost some of the timbre that had made him the model of a callow young lover. He moved on to more mature roles such as Peter Grimes. He made his last stage appearance in 1985 singing Adam Ecl in Karel Kovařovic's opera Psohlavci (The Dogheads) before retiring from the stage. However, his retirement was short-lived. He was recalled in 1989 to take over as director of the National Theatre opera company, and he guided it through the early years of the new democratic republic following the Velvet Revolution.

Though not a member of the Communist party, Žídek was awarded a state prize in 1952, made a Merited Artist in 1958 and a National Artist in 1976. He publicly renounced those titles during the Velvet Revolution in November 1989 when he joined Václav Havel on the balcony overlooking the packed Wenceslas Square and led the crowds in singing the Czech National Anthem.

Not long afterward, the Edinburgh Festival extended another invitation to the National Theatre for an opera residency, but Žídek declined, claiming that his company was not artistically ready to meet the standards of the festival or the company's former glory. He retired as opera company director in 1991 but continued to direct opera productions there until 2001.

Ivo Žídek was married to Libuse Mrázová in 1947, and the couple had two sons who carried on the family musical tradition - Ivo, a stage designer, and Libor, a soloist with the operetta company at Karlín. He died in Prague on 19 May 2003 after a long illness.
