= Peter Ebert =

German operatic director

Peter Ebert (6 April 1918, Frankfurt am Main, Germany – 25 December 2012, Sussex, England) was a German opera director. Son of noted German director Carl Ebert who left Nazi Germany in 1934 with his son and moved to England, he was best known for his work with Glyndebourne Opera and the Scottish Opera where he staged over 50 productions from 1963 to 1980 and which brought him great success.

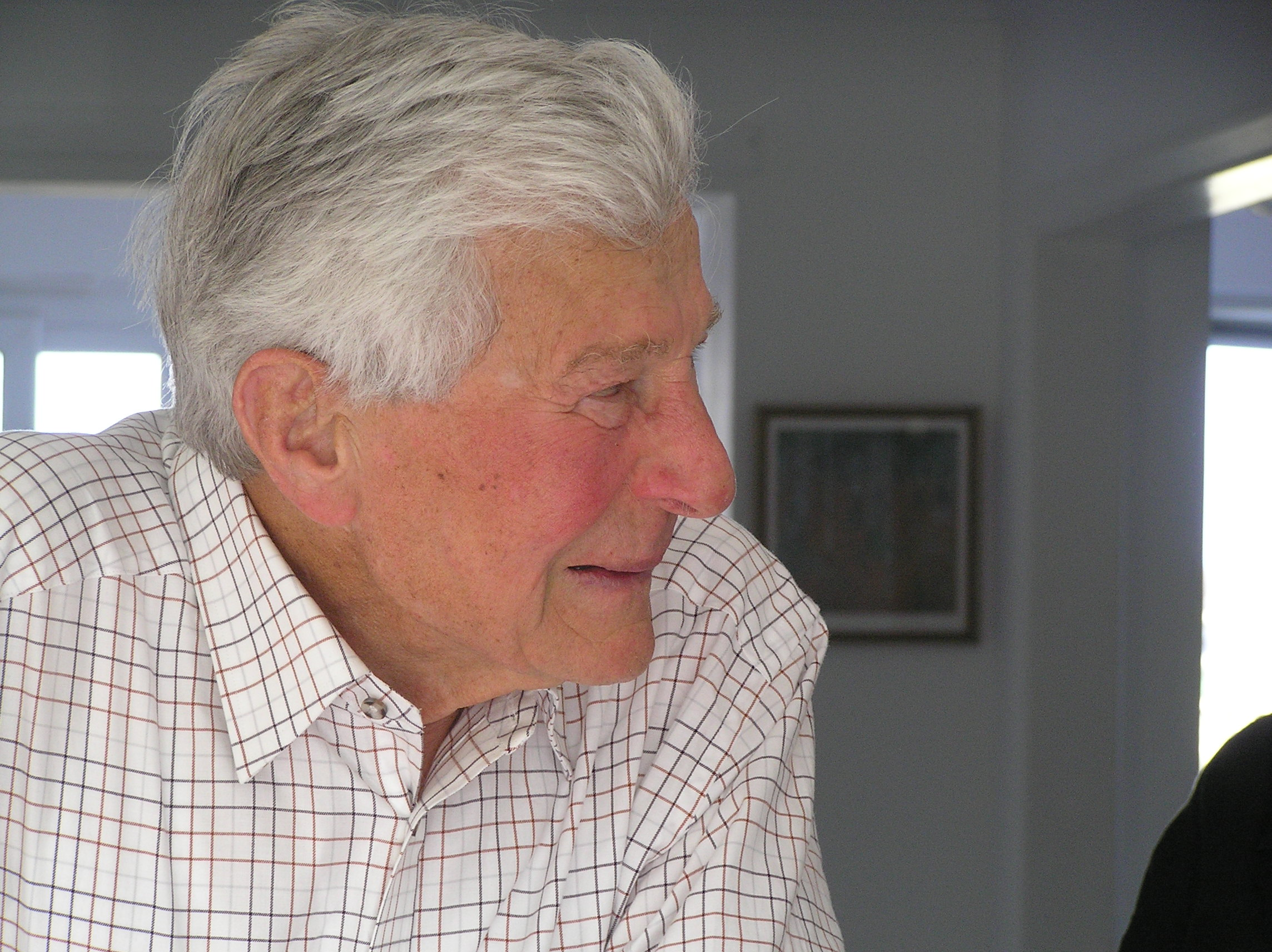
Peter Ebert 2007

== Family life in Germany ==
Peter Ebert was the son of Charles, later Carl, Ebert and Cissi (Lucie Frederike Karoline (née Splisgarth), who was German. Carl was the outcome of a romantic liaison of a Polish count and an Irish American music student. Peter was therefore half German. Peter's parents divorced when he was six, both parties remarrying and staying on excellent terms. Due to the separation, his early years of schooling were chequered, so he was finally sent to one of Kurt Hahn's boarding schools in Germany.

In 1933 Carl was invited by the Nazis to take charge of the theatre scene in Berlin, but in a strong political gesture he chose to leave Germany and the family settled in Switzerland. Peter was given the choice of staying or leaving Germany and chose to leave. He was one of the 13 boys to make up the first intake of the new Gordonstoun School under the headmastership of the also emigrated Kurt Hahn.

== Move to England ==
With Carls friend the conductor, Fritz Busch who became the first music director of this new company, Carl had been asked by John Christie to take part in the founding of the Glyndebourne Opera. In 1934 at age 16, Peter visited Glyndebourne (where Carl was directing the operas for the first season) on his way to his boarding school in Scotland and it inspired a lasting love of England and its way of life and especially of Glyndebourne.

The pre-war seasons where sensational as Carl brought revolutionary ideas about production to England. Examples of his approach included the requirement that singers should act, and that the music was to be the guide, with the seamless whole being an interpretation of the music. This approach was well received by critics.

After two years at Gordonstoun, Peter spent six months apprenticed to a private bank, but then moved to Dartington Hall in Devonshire, where the Elmhirsts were carrying out a major cultural experiment. Ebert's stepfather, Hans Oppenheim, was running the Music School there, having also left Germany. So Peter joined his mother and "Oppi" there to study film making and forestry.

== Personal life ==
At the time of the Dunkirk evacuation during World War II, Ebert was interned in various camps as a "friendly enemy alien" because, at this point, he had not been naturalised. When released, he returned to Dartington Hall where he met Kathleen Elsie Bone (Kitti), his first wife. They afterwards moved to London and had two daughters, Judith and Tabitha. Peter had various jobs, some in the theatre, and then joined the German Service of the BBC. His marriage ended in 1947.

In August 1947, when he was working in Scotland, he met Silvia Ashmole, a dancer and his future wife. However, Silvia was forbidden by her parents to see Peter because he was still legally married (albeit separated), he had children, and was German. Nonetheless, they married in 1951 and went on to have eight children.

After living in various parts of Britain and in Germany during his career, Ebert returning to Sussex in 1980, spending ten years staging opera productions in Sussex and abroad. Later, he was very active in local politics after the founding of the Social Democratic Party. He was elected a District Councillor for Lewes.

He and his family lived in Sussex for ten years but, in 1990, the couple sold their Sussex home and bought a semi-derelict farmhouse in Italy. At age 70, he went about restoring, converting and enhancing this house in the Umbrian hills. In 2004 after a healthy life, Peter was suffering from damage to his heart valves. The family moved back to England, to Sussex and within walking distance of Glyndebourne.

By his last years, Peter Ebert's family consisted of the couple's three girls and five boys who have 17 surviving grandchildren plus three more surviving from Tabitha, his daughter from his first marriage. There are also three step-grandchildren with offspring.

Until the end, he and Silvia had a strong and loving marriage of 61 years. Peter Ebert died in Sussex and is buried in the churchyard at Ringmer, East Sussex.

== Glyndebourne years ==
In 1947 he was invited by Glyndebourne to be Assistant Producer to his father whose first post-war Glyndebourne production was Orfeo by Gluck, with Kathleen Ferrier. Given Glyndebourne's involvement in founding the Edinburgh Festival (Rudolf Bing was its first director), in August Peter went to Scotland to assist on the production of Verdi's Macbeth.

The Glyndebourne productions during the 1950s were very successful. La cenerentola and Cosi fan tutte were sellouts and could have been played every year. But The Marriage of Figaro, Idomeneo, Le Comte Ory as well as Ebert's own production of Don Giovanni with John Piper's sets, which was enhanced musically by the, then, music director Vittorio Gui. For 20 years up to 1954, almost every production was undertaken by Carl Ebert, but in that year Peter's production of Arlecchino by Busoni and under John Pritchard introduced the young director. Peter Ebert maintained an association with the company until the 1960s and especially with the television performances. Having left he BBC, he took a course in the new art of producing for television and became in charge (along with Outside Broadcast producer, Noble Wilson) of the early, annual transmissions from Glyndebourne. The enormous cameras had to run on wooden tracks down through the auditorium.

Outside of the Glyndebourne season Peter Ebert staged his first production for the Wexford Festival, an opera festival founded in 1951 by Tom Walsh and his friends and held in the autumn. The opera was L'elisir d'amore by Donizetti, and he went on to stage 16 productions there between 1952 and 1965, some of very rarely performed works, culminating in 1965 with one production by Carl Ebert and another designed by his daughter Judith as well as his own La Traviata. Peter was invited back to give talks in his later years.

== Return to Germany, 1954 – 1962 ==
In 1954 Peter Ebert became chief producer at the Staatsoper Hannover in Hanover under Intendant Kurt Ehrhardt, and the family moved there. Peter stayed six years and learned a large amount of the opera repertoire in a theatre with very high standards. However, the summers were nearly always spent working at Glyndebourne as assistant to his father and later doing his own productions and restaging his fathers’ work.

When Glyndebourne took Le Comte Ory and Falstaff to Paris, Ebert did all the technical and preparatory work as well as the rehearsals. When La cenerentola went to West Berlin, Peter was in charge of the whole thing as his father fell ill. Later, when his father died, Bernard Levin, the leading critic, wrote an obituary lengthily praising a production of Mozart's Entführung aus dem Serail, not realising it was Peter's.

During those years Peter Ebert had established an international reputation and thereafter worked in America, Canada, South Africa, Italy, Denmark and Germany. But Peter's closest ties were with England. He loved Glyndebourne and carried an enormous debt of gratitude to it and the Christie family.

In 1960 Ebert moved to Düsseldorf/Duisburg, a larger theatre with many singers but found little sense of teamwork. He left after 2 years.

== England as his base ==
After 1962, he moved back to England and bought a big house in Sussex to accommodate his family. For the next six years Ebert worked as a freelancer, doing productions in Los Angeles, Pretoria, Copenhagen and Basle. At this time he also produced a studio production of La traviata for the BBC, as well as presenting a music programme "Music in Camera", where the first meeting of Jacqueline du Pré and Daniel Barenboim in public took place. Later, Peter ran the Opera School at Toronto University for 18 months.

== Germany again, 1968 to 1977 ==
In 1968 Ebert was asked to become General Administrator in Augsburg, Germany. There he was in charge of opera, plays, concerts, ballet and operetta. He had a fruitful and productive period with an excellent team including the designer, Hans Ulrich Schmückle. Among many other operas for them, he staged Berlioz's Les Troyens (The Trojans) which he afterwards took to Scottish Opera.

In 1973 he moved to Bielefeld as Intendant and in 1975 to the Hessisches Staatstheater Wiesbaden in Wiesbaden.

== Scottish Opera ==
In 1977 he was asked to join Scottish Opera, with which he had been associated (by doing freelance productions), since its foundation by Sir Alexander Gibson in 1962.

Peter Ebert had a very successful and creative three years there before he "resigned...in 1980 in some bitterness over the financing and future artistic policy of the company."

He was awarded an Honorary Doctorate for services to Music by St. Andrews University in 1979.

The Scotsman newspaper's obituary notes that "from the outset he was an inspiring figure and as director of productions from 1965 to 1975 he was responsible for a wide variety of operas which included works by Monteverdi to Don Pasquale and Fidelio". He creating the company's first orchestra, staging Scotland's first-ever Ring cycle and The Trojans, with an excellent cast including Janet Baker. He took opera to the Edinburgh Playhouse Theatre where the performances attracted the biggest audience ever for an opera in Scotland. In addition, it has been noted that:

He directed a memorable Falstaff with Geraint Evans making his debut in the title role and built a particularly strong artistic relationship with several singers, including the soprano Helga Dernesch. Dernesch was to deliver commanding performances in both the Ring Cycle (alongside David Ward) and Les Troyens.... When these two mammoth productions were seen at the Edinburgh Festivals of 1971 and 1972 the critics went overboard in their praise of Ebert's visionary direction. The Scotsman drew attention to Ebert's "clear, unforced" direction in the Wagner and of "the glory" he brought to the Berlioz.

== Ebert's career in the opera world ==
=== Professional qualities ===
Ebert's great talent in the professional field as a director, lay in his power to create a "perfect whole". Given the right conditions, he was able to charm their best performances out of his singers, which, combined with the enormous musicality of Peter's productions and his feeling for the visual aspects, made his work with conductor, designer and cast extremely fruitful and productive. Opera has so many imponderables so it obviously didn't always work 100% of the time. Peter was a fair, capable and charming administrator. With his team he planned the season's repertoire with zest. He tried to institute more co-operative administration in his German theatres. He had no interest in the financial side of the administration and was happy to leave it with those qualified to do it. He also had no talent for fund-raising, for example, in Scotland. He was an artist, not a business man.

==== Productions at Glyndebourne, Liverpool and Edinburgh ====
- 1954: Arlecchino; *1955: La Forza del destino in Edinburgh. *1956: Die Entführung aus dem Serail and Don Giovanni. *1957: Don Giovanni repeated, plus L'italiana in Algeri and Mozart's "Abduction" again. *1958: Il segreto di Susanna. *1959: Le nozze di Figaro. *1960: Il segreto di Susanna and Arlecchino both in Edinburgh. *1961: Die Entführung aus dem Serail

==== Peter Ebert's stagings for Carl Ebert at Glyndebourne ====
1959: La Cenerentola; *1960: Falstaff, La Cenerentola, Falstaff (Edinburgh); *1961: The Barber of Seville; *1962: The marriage of Figaro, Ariadne auf Naxos; *1963: The Marriage of Figaro and The Rake's Progress; *1964: Idomeneo

==== Productions at Scottish Opera ====
Between 1963 and 1980, Peter Ebert is on record as having directed around 50 productions (including the four-opera Ring Cycle on one occasion.)

His 1960s productions include Don Giovanni, the whole of the Ring Cycle, and a significant number of opera by Puccini, including three productions of Madame Butterfly (with three more in the 1970s). That decade includes three of Verdi's Falstaff and two of Simon Boccanegra plus a few "Ring" operas and two Magic Flutes. The less well-known repertoire presented during his tenure included Beethoven's Fidelio (three productions) and Berlioz' Les Troyens (two productions).

== Publications by Peter Ebert ==
- In This Theatre of Man's Life: The Biography of Carl Ebert. Lewes, Sussex: The Book Guild Ltd., 1999 ISBN 1-85776-347-5
