= Václav Kašlík =

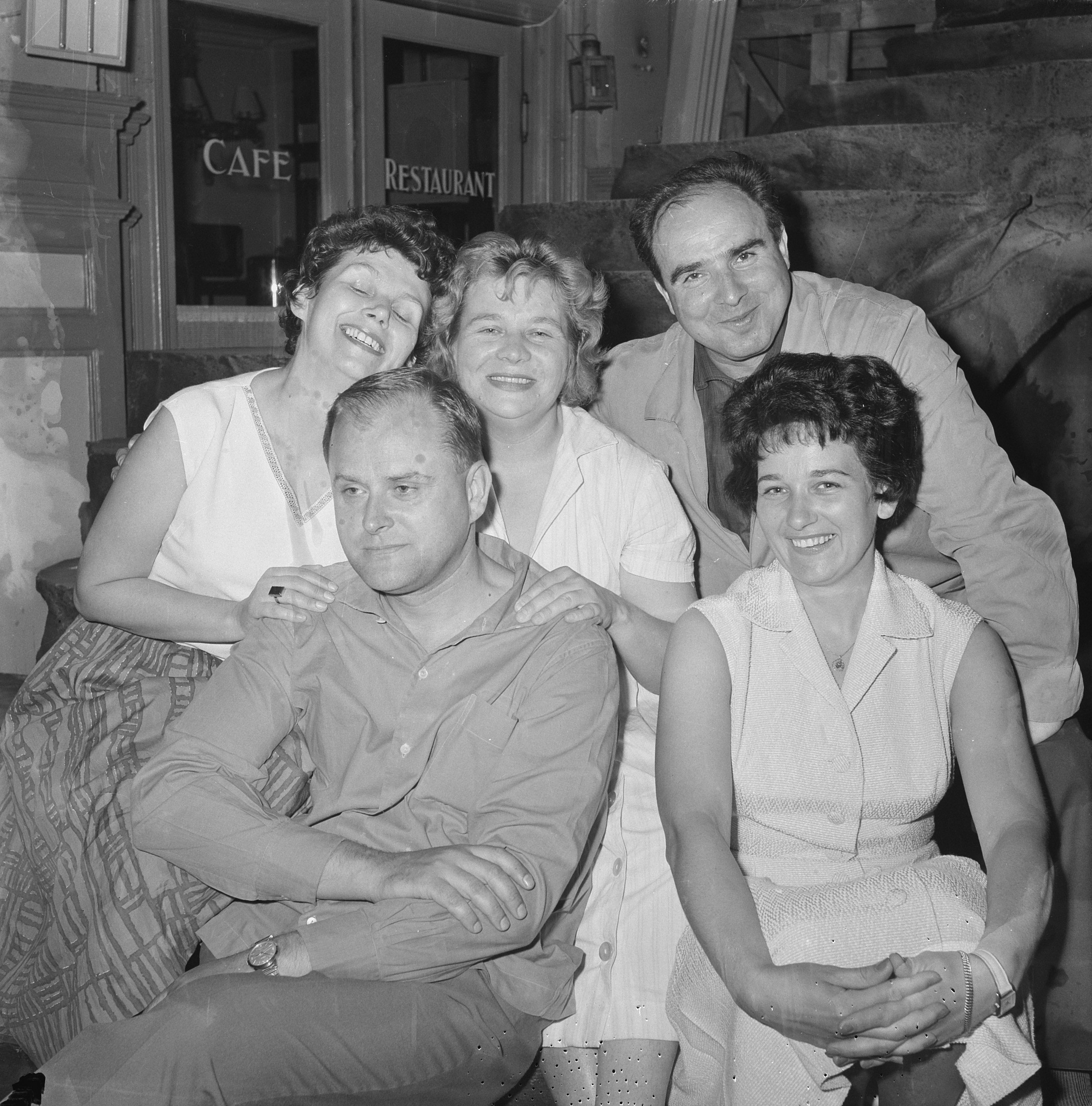
- Back row (left to right): Jadwiga Wysoczanská, Annie Delorie, Václav Kašlík. Front row: Ivo Žídek, Ivana Mixová (?) in 1963
- Born: 28 September 1917; Poličná, Moravia, Austria-Hungary
- Died: 4 June 1989 (aged 71); Valašské Meziříčí, Czechoslovakia
- Occupations: composer, opera director and conductor

Václav Kašlík (28 September 1917 – 4 June 1989) was a Czech composer, opera director and conductor, known for his operas, both on the stage and on television.

== Biography ==
Kašlík was born in Poličná in Moravia, Austria-Hungary (now part of Valašské Meziříčí in the Czech Republic). He studied musicology at Prague University and composition, conducting, and opera production at the Prague Conservatory. In 1940, he began working for Brno radio as a conductor, and made his debut as a director at the Prague National Theatre with Boleslav Vomáčka's The Watersprite. In 1945, he and Alois Hába founded on the grounds of the former Neues Deutsches Theater the Grand Opera of the Fifth of May (today the State Opera Prague).

In 1953, he returned to the Prague National Theatre, establishing international reputation as a director. His use of television, film, and projections brought him wide acclaim, particularly due to the collaboration with Josef Svoboda.

His compositions are influenced by the folk music of Moravia and Moravian Wallachia, as well as jazz and pop music.
