= Teatro Comunale, Florence =

Opera house in Florence, Italy

Coordinates: 43°46′30.01″N 11°14′20.47″E

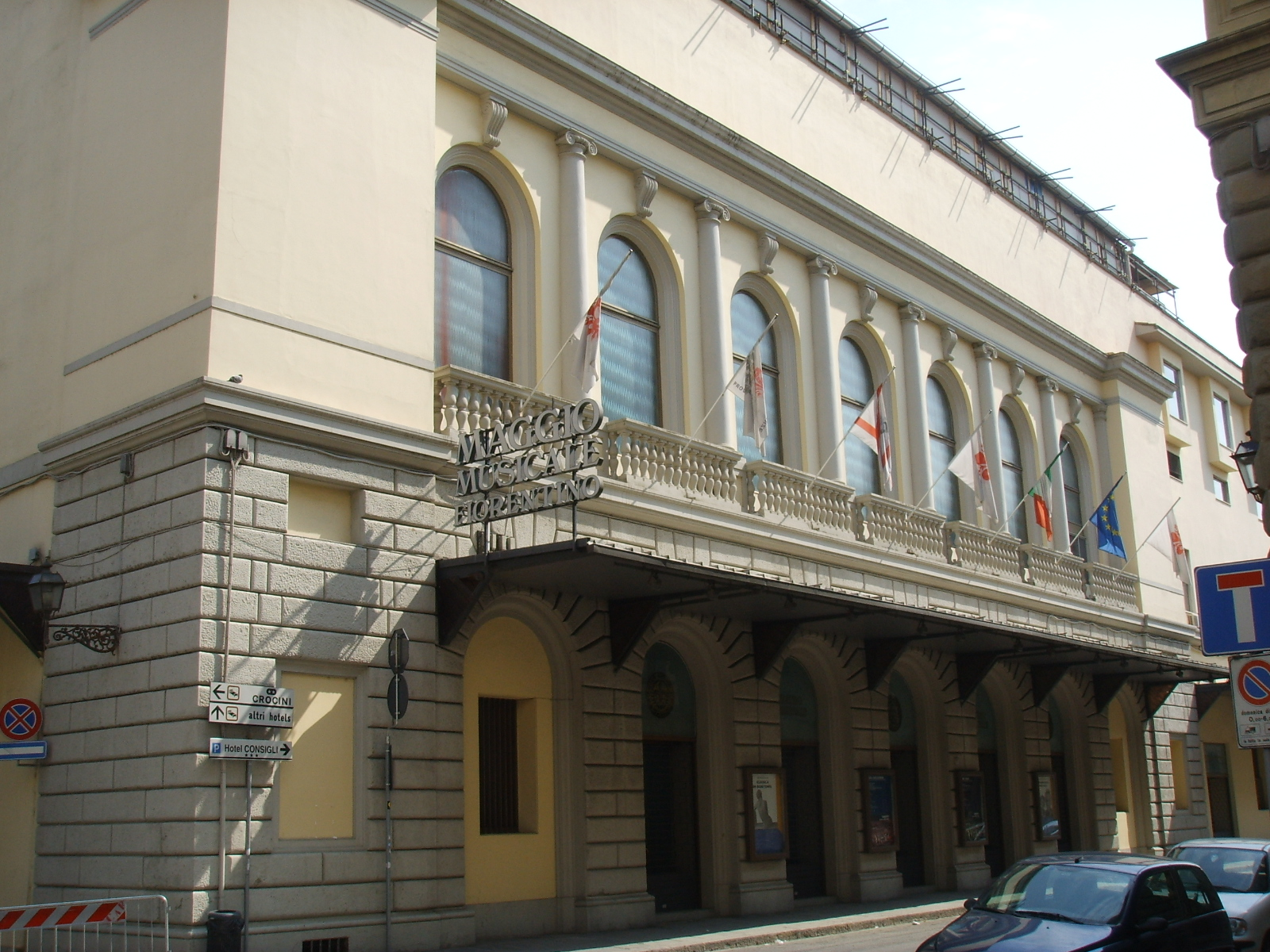
Theatre: exterior view

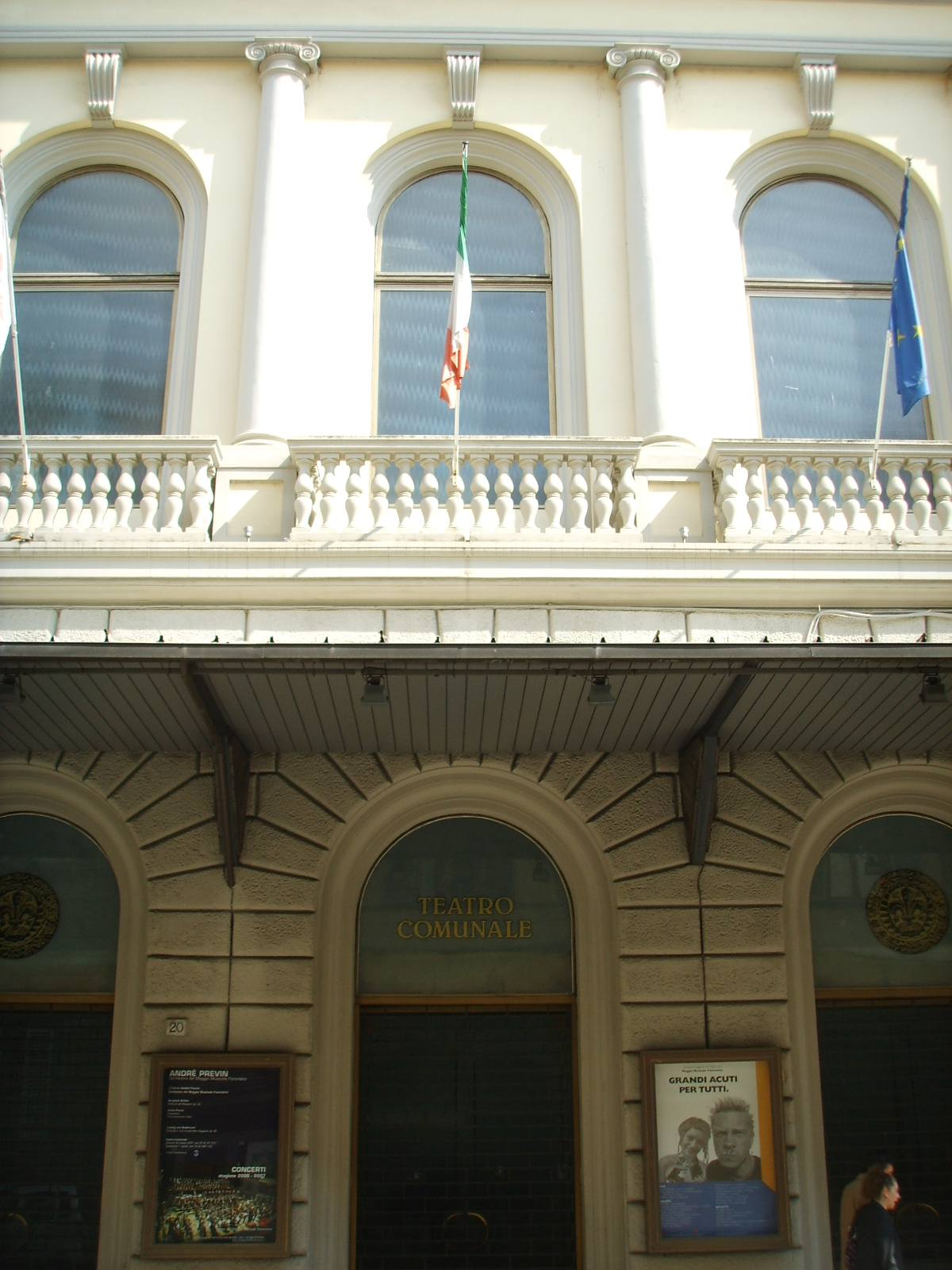
Theatre: front entrance

The Teatro Comunale di Firenze was an opera house in Florence, Italy. It was originally built as the open-air amphitheatre, the Politeama Fiorentino Vittorio Emanuele, which was inaugurated on 17 May 1862 with a production of Donizetti's Lucia di Lammermoor and which seated 6,000 people. It became the focus on cultural life in the city. After closure caused by fire, it reopened in April 1864 and acquired a roof in 1882. By 1911 it had both electricity and heating.

== History ==
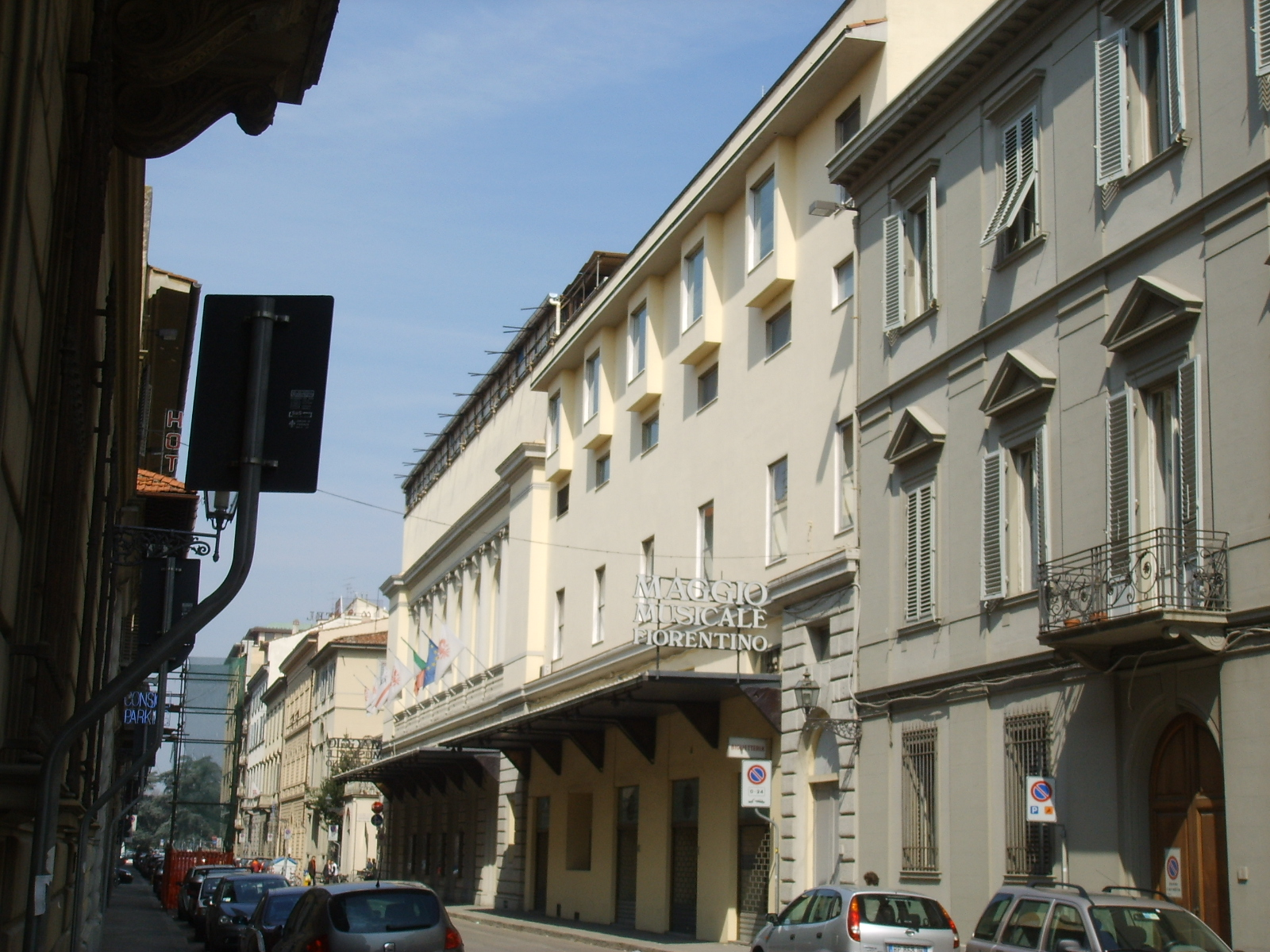
Theatre: street view

In 1930 the building was taken over by the city authorities who renamed it the Teatro Comunale. Bombing during the Second World War damaged the building once again, and other problems closed it for three years in 1958. Finally, in May 1961, the then-modernized theatre reopened with Verdi's Don Carlo. It had become a 2,000 seat elliptically shaped auditorium consisting of a large orchestra section, one tier of boxes, and two wide semicircular galleries, which betray the building's amphitheatre origins.

As the theatre became more closely associated with Italy's first and most important music festival, the annual Maggio Musicale Fiorentino which had begun in 1931 as a triennial festival and, except for the war years, became an annual one after 1937, so its name was changed once again for the festivals to the Teatro del Maggio Musicale Fiorentino.

In 2014, the Maggio Musicale Fiorentino moved to the newer and larger Teatro del Maggio Musicale Fiorentino. The Teatro Comunale was demolished in 2021.

== See also ==
- List of opera houses
