= Jaroslav Krombholc =

Czech conductor (1918–1983)

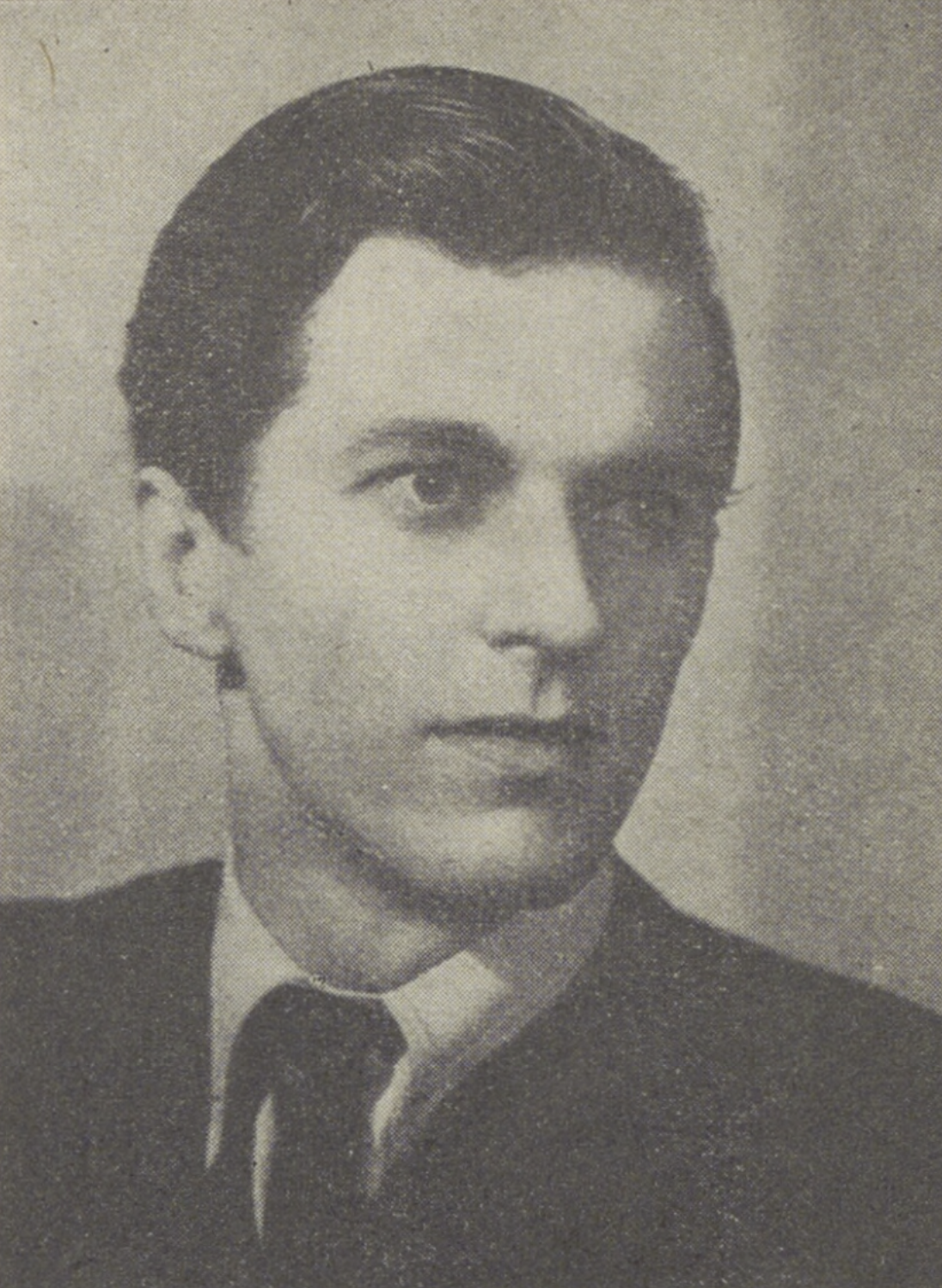
- Krombholc in 1955
- Born: 30 January 1918; Prague, Bohemia, Austria-Hungary
- Died: 16 July 1983 (aged 65); Prague, Czechoslovakia
- Occupation: Conductor

Signature
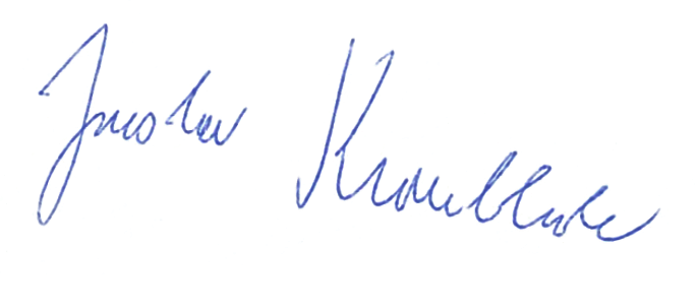

Jaroslav Krombholc (30 January 1918 – 16 July 1983) was a Czech conductor. He conducted operas at the National Theatre in Prague for almost his entire career and ranked among the most important Czech opera conductors.

== Early life and education ==
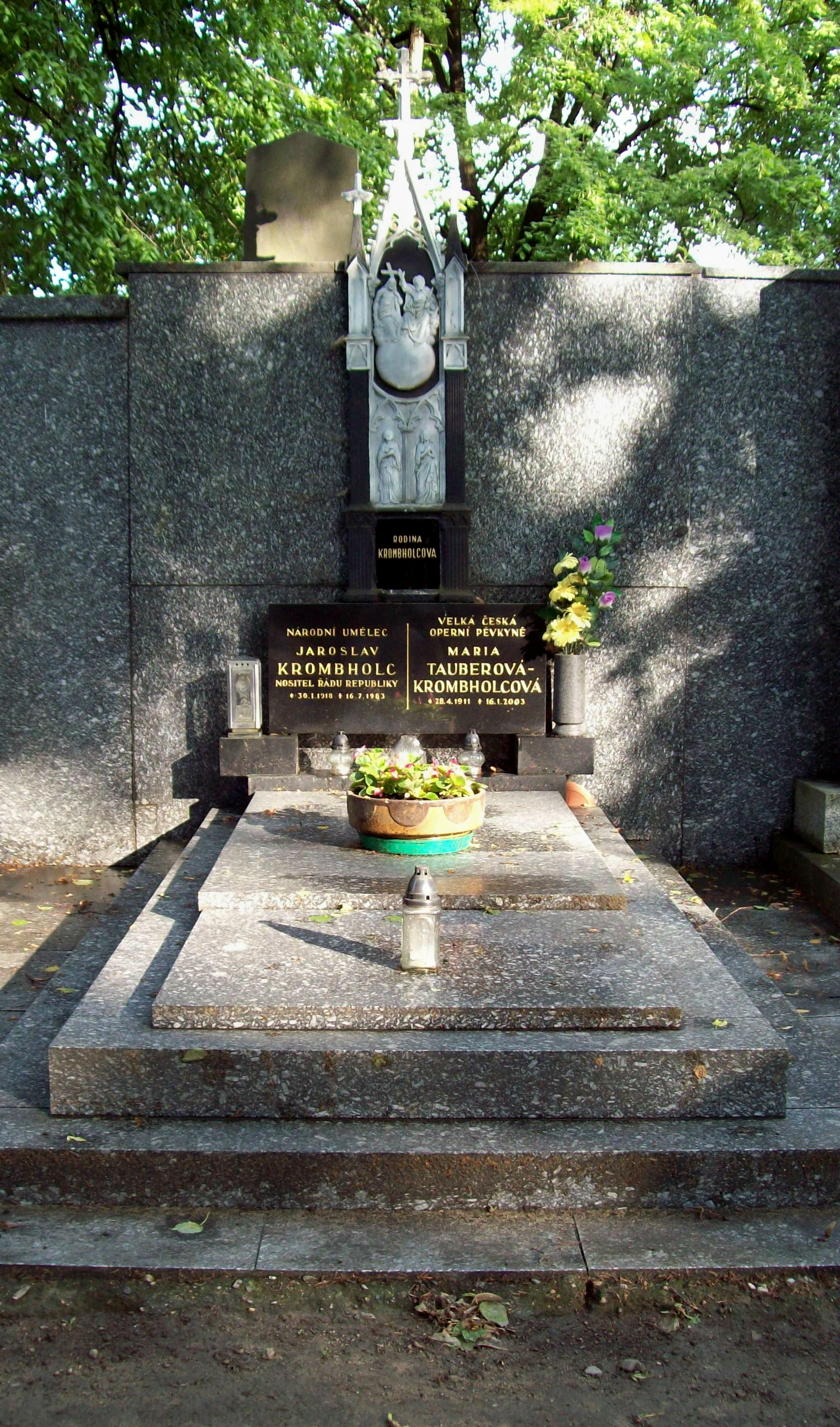
Grave of Jaroslav Krombholc and Maria Tauberová in Mělník

Krombholc was born on 30 January 1918 in Prague, however, he lived in Mělník from the early age and graduated from the gymnasium in Mělník. He was born into a musician family. He received private lessons from Otakar Ostrčil already during his high school years. He studied at Prague Conservatory in 1937–1940. In 1940–1942, he attended the conducting school of Václav Talich.

== Career ==
Talich and also Zdeněk Chalabala, who was the principal conductor of the National Theatre in Prague, recognized Krombholc's talent, and from 1 April 1940 Krombholc was engaged as a Répétiteur in the opera company of the National Theatre. He conducted the opera for the first time at the National Theatre on 9 June 1941. It was Josef Suk's music for Zeyer's Radúz and Mahulena. He conducted at the National Theatre until 1943. In 1943–1945, he was the chief of opera at National Moravian-Silesian Theatre in Ostrava. After the end of World War II in 1945, he returned to the National Theatre and remained there until the end of his career, although in some phases of his career he only guested there and was also involved in conducting the Czech Philharmonic and the Symphony Orchestra of the Czechoslovak Radio.

In 1948, Krombholc conducted for the first time abroad, namely Janáček's Jenůfa at the Vienna State Opera in Austria. Five reprises of the opera, however, due to the change in political conditions and the Iron Curtain, were Krombholc's last foreign performances for a long time. In 1955, he went on tour with the National Theatre to Moscow in Soviet Union. In the following years, he performed on tours in Berlin, Brussels and also in Royal Opera House in London, as the first Czech conductor after World War II.

He made various recordings of Czech operas for Supraphon, notably Janáček's Káťa Kabanová, and Martinů's Julietta.

Krombholc created a unique style and was appreciated for his use of orchestral sound and for his ability to dramatically construct an operatic work. His successful career ranked him among the most important Czech opera conductors.

== Family and late life ==
His wife was the soprano Maria Tauberová. He died in Prague on 16 July 1983. He is buried in the family tomb in Mělník.
