= Mount Tabor (disambiguation) =

Mount Tabor is an important Biblical site located in Lower Galilee, Israel.

Mount Tabor may also refer to:

== Places ==
=== United States ===
- Mount Tabor, Indiana, an unincorporated community
- Mount Tabor, Lexington, Kentucky, a neighborhood of Lexington
- Mount Tabor, New Jersey, a neighborhood of Parsippany-Troy Hills and a census-designated place
- Mount Tabor, Ohio, an unincorporated community
- Mount Tabor, Portland, Oregon, a neighborhood of Portland
- Mount Tabor, Adams County, Pennsylvania, an unincorporated community
- Mount Tabor, Armstrong County, Pennsylvania, an unincorporated community
- Mount Tabor, Vermont, a town
- Mount Tabor, Wisconsin, an unincorporated community
- Mount Tabor (Oregon), an extinct volcano and park in Portland

=== Elsewhere ===
- Mount Tabor, Queensland, Australia, a rural locality
- Mount Tabor (British Columbia), a mountain near Prince George, British Columbia, Canada
- Mount Tabor, West Yorkshire, England, a hamlet

== Churches and monasteries ==
- Mount Tabor Methodist Episcopal Church (Crownsville, Maryland), United States
- Mount Tabor Methodist Episcopal Church (West Liberty, Ohio), United States
- Mount Tabor AME Zion Church and Cemetery - see National Register of Historic Places listings in Cumberland County, Pennsylvania, United States
- Mt. Tabor Baptist Church, Lewisburg, West Virginia, United States
- Mount Tabor Monastery, Pathanapuram, Kerala, India

== Other uses ==
- Battle of Mount Tabor (disambiguation)
- Mount Tabor Indian Community, a nonprofit organization in Texas
- Mount Tabor station, a New Jersey Transit station in Denville
- Mount Tabor High School, Winston-Salem, North Carolina
- Mount Tabor Theater, a later name of the Alhambra Theatre (Portland, Oregon)
- Mount Tabor Good Samaritan Lodge No. 59, Crownsville, Maryland, United States, on the National Register of Historic Places

== See also ==
- Quercus ithaburensis, also known as the Mount Tabor oak, a tree species
- Debre Tabor, Ethiopia (Amharic for "Mount Tabor"), a town and woreda
- Montabaur, Rhineland-Palatinate, Germany, a town
- Monte Tabor (Italian for "Mount Tabor"), a hill
- Taaborinvuori (literally translated "Mount Tabor"), a museum and outdoor theatre area in Nurmijärvi, Finland
- Le Tabor, a mountain in the Isère department of France
- Tabor (disambiguation)
