= Mount Tabor Methodist Episcopal Church =

Mount Tabor Methodist Episcopal Church may refer to:

- Mount Tabor Methodist Episcopal Church (Crownsville, Maryland)
- Mount Tabor Methodist Episcopal Church (West Liberty, Ohio)
