= Tabor =

Tabor may refer to:

== Places ==
- Mount Tabor, Galilee, Israel, a Biblical site, after which the other places are named.

=== Czech Republic ===
- Tábor District, the surrounding district
  - Tábor, a town within the district in the South Bohemian Region
- Tábor, a village and part of Velké Heraltice in the Moravian-Silesian Region

=== Slovenia ===
- Municipality of Tabor
  - Tabor, Tabor, a village in the municipality
- Tabor District, a city district of Maribor
- Tabor, Nova Gorica, a village
- Tabor, Sežana, a village
- Šilentabor, known as Tabor (nad Knežakom) until 2000

=== United States ===
- Tabor, Colorado, an unincorporated community
- Tabor, Illinois, an unincorporated community
- Tabor, Iowa, a city
- Tabor Township, Polk County, Minnesota
- Mount Tabor, New Jersey, a CDP also known as Tabor
- Mount Tabor, Ohio, a former community also called Tabor
- Tabor, South Dakota, a town

=== Elsewhere ===
- Tabor, Victoria, Australia
- Tabor, Masovian Voivodeship, Poland, a village
- Le Tabor, a mountain in the Isère department of France
- Tabor Island or Maria Theresa Reef, a non-existent reef
- Tabor (Martian crater)

== Schools ==
- Tabor Academy (disambiguation)
- Tabor College (disambiguation)
- Tabor Park Vocational School, Toronto, Canada

== Churches ==
- Tabor Church (Berlin-Hohenschönhausen), Hohenschönhausen, Berlin, Germany
- Tabor Church (Berlin-Wilhelmshagen), Berlin
- Tabor Church, Kreuzberg, Berlin
- Tabor Congregational Church, Iowa, US

== People ==
- Tabor (surname), a list of people
- Stanisław Tatar (nom de guerre "Stanisław Tabor") (1896-1980), Polish Army general

== Other uses ==
- Tabor Light, a light seen by Paul the Apostle in the doctrine of Eastern Orthodox theology
- Tabor (formation), a camp
- Tabor (Morocco), a type of a military unit
- Tabor (instrument), a snare drum
- Tabor Home for Needy and Destitute Children, Doylestown Township, Bucks County, Pennsylvania, United States, on the National Register of Historic Places
- Tarrant Tabor, a British triplane bomber
- Tabor (character), in the animated television series Swat Kats
- "Tábor", the fifth symphonic poem in Smetana's Má vlast
- Taxpayer Bill of Rights, a concept

== See also ==
- Mount Tabor (disambiguation)
- Taborites
- Taber (disambiguation)
- Tavor (disambiguation)
- Three-hole pipe or tabor pipe, a wind musical instrument
