= Pietro Giordani =

Italian writer, classical literary scholar

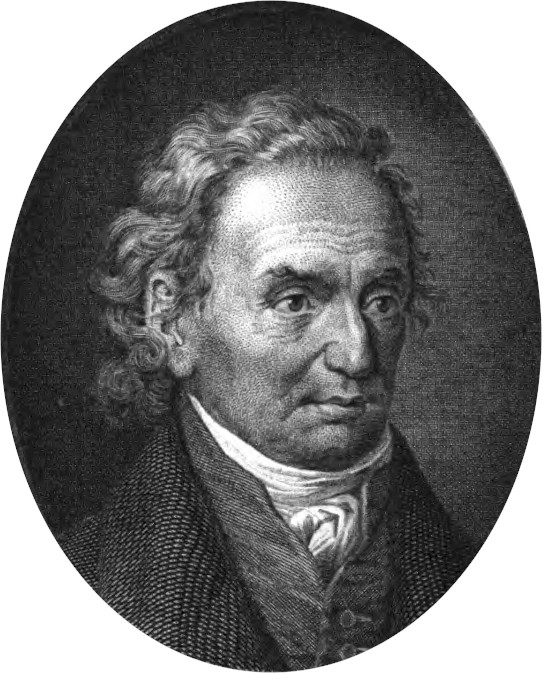
- Born: 1 January 1774; Piacenza, Duchy of Parma and Piacenza
- Died: 2 September 1848 (aged 74); Parma, Duchy of Parma and Piacenza
- Occupation: Writer, art historian
- Movement: Neoclassicism

Pietro Giordani (1 January 1774 – 2 September 1848) was an Italian writer, classical literary scholar, a Freemason of the Grand Orient of Italy and a close friend of, and influence on, Giacomo Leopardi.

== Biography ==
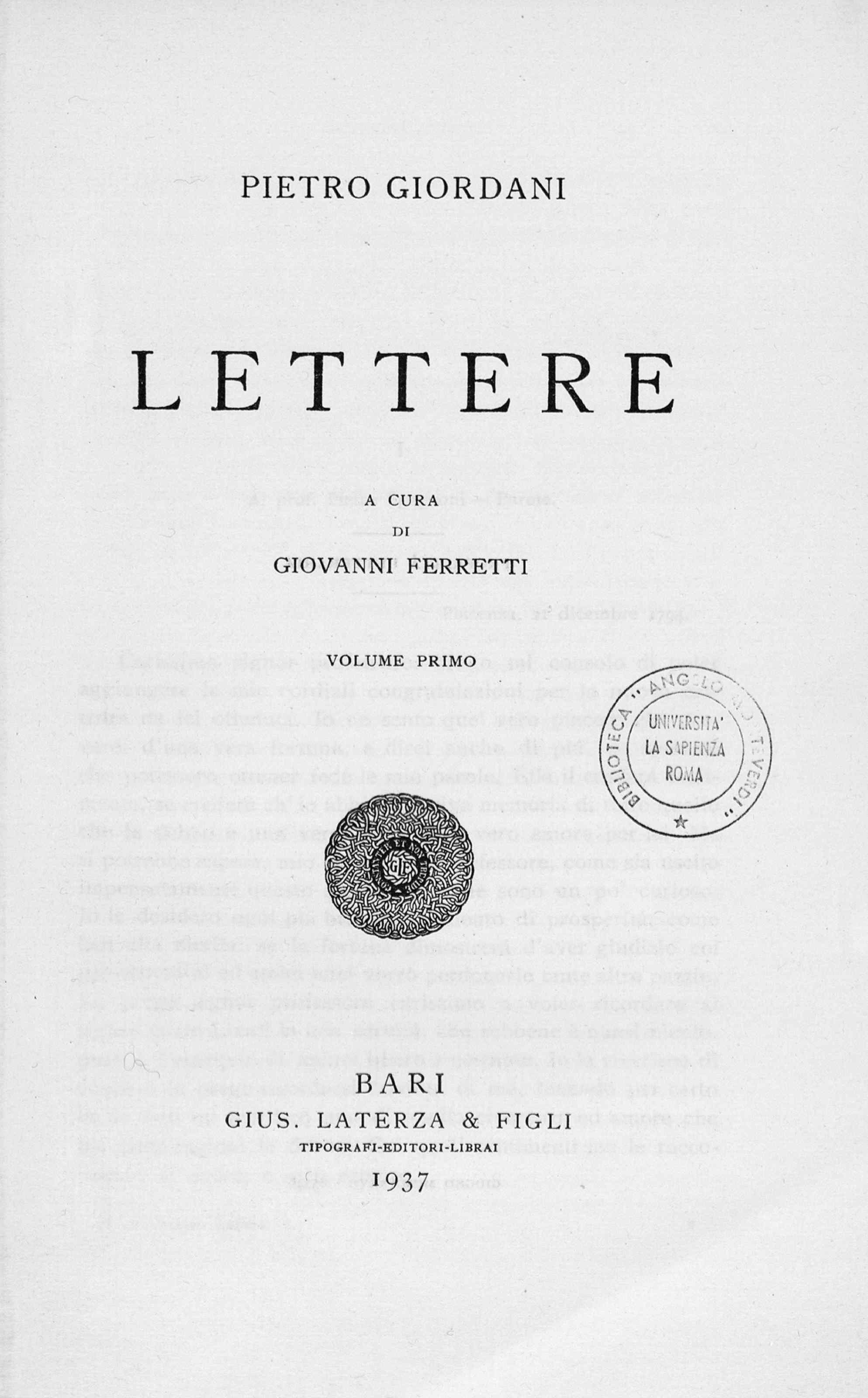
Lettere e carteggi

Born in Piacenza, Giordani originally set out to become a monk. But after having entered into the Benedictine convent of Saint Sixtus at Piacenza in 1797, he eventually changed his mind and abandoned the clerical vocation in favour of his only real love, literature. He looked with extreme favour upon Napoleon Bonaparte and the Napoleonic regime in Italy and, in 1807, he wrote a Panegyric on the Sacred Majesty of Napoleon. The following year, he obtained the post of proto-secretary of the Academy of Fine Arts in Bologna, which, however, he had to abandon in 1815: with the beginning of the Restoration, he became highly suspect for his liberal, republican ideals.

In 1816, he began his epistolary exchange with Giacomo Leopardi to whom he eventually paid a visit in 1818, accompanying him during his first travels outside of the small village of Recanati, to Macerata. He continued visiting him frequently during the following years. Giordani encouraged and helped foster the intellectual development and the further acquisition of knowledge that led to Leopardi's eventual greatness by exposing him to different cultural environments, including an important group of writers and intellectuals of the time. They shared a deep and lasting affection and esteem for each other. So much so, that Leopardi once described Giordani as his "dear and beneficent paternal image."

The inheritance left to him by his father in 1817 assured Giordani's economic independence and, as a consequence, also ensured him a great deal of intellectual independence. In February 1817, Giacomo Leopardi sent three copies of his own personal translation of the Virgilian Aeneid to Angelo Mai, Vincenzo Monti and Pietro Giordani, the leading exponents of Italian classicism. While the first two confined themselves to a polite reply, the Piacentine author immediately made himself available for an interview. Giordani encouraged and fostered the Recanatese's acquaintance in cultural circles, and the two had great esteem and affection for each other: the young poet called him "dear and good fatherly image" (from verse 83 of Canto XV of Dante's Inferno).

Giordani travelled a great deal and settled, at various times, in Piacenza, Bologna and, finally, in Milan, where he became an editor, along with Vincenzo Monti, Giuseppe Acerbi and the geologist Scipione Breislak, of the classicist magazine La Biblioteca Italiana. He felt compelled to leave this position, however, because of an increasing atmosphere of political conflict and antagonism with Giuseppe Acerbi, who held firmly Austro-Hungarian sympathies. In Florence, he began subscribing to the liberal magazine Antologia run by Giovan Pietro Vieusseux. In the year 1825, he managed to get published, in this magazine, a letter to the Marchese Gino Capponi in which he proposed the idea of editing and publishing a collection (Scelta de' Prosatori Italiani) of all the works of the most important writers in Italian history, from Dante to contemporary writers of the time (including Leopardi), in volumes which did not cost more than 24 scudos. Nonetheless, he always maintained a detached and somewhat indifferent attitude toward this magazine because it propounded a vision of a radical renewal of the functions of the intellectual in public life along purely materialistic and commercial lines; the intellectual was to be viewed as a sort of merchant of ideas and an integral, organic part of the process of economic and material rationalization of society and culture along market-lines. Giordani rejected this vision of a market of letters, preferring to stick to his lofty Aristotelian conception of the contemplative and austere poet.

After the suppression of the uprisings of 1821, there followed a period of retrenchment. Intellectuals generally abandoned the prospect of revolution in favour of a more moderate, reformist program, and the centre of progressive culture moved away from Milan to Florence, and from the magazine Il Conciliatiore to Antologia. The uprisings of 1831 would find the intellectuals absent altogether, and even Giordani, as a consequence, found himself something of an outcast in Italian society.

In his final years, he lived in Parma, where he was incarcerated for three months in 1834 and where he died in 1848, ironically enough, precisely during the period of the (provisional) success of the anti-Austrian uprisings.

== Works ==
- Description of the Bonaparte Forum, 1806.
- On the Poetic Style of the Marchese of Montrone, 1807.
- Panegyric on the Sacred Majesty of Napoleon, 1807.
- Panegyric to Antonio Canova, 1810.
- On the Life and Work of Cardinal Sforza Pallavicino, 1810.
- On a Painting of cav. Landi and one of cav. Camuccini, 1811.
- For the Three Legations Reacquired by the Pope, 1815.
- The Halicarnasus of Mai, 1816.
- On Three Poems Painted a Fresco, 1832.
- Preamble to the Third Volume of the Operas of Giacomo Leopardi, 1845.

== The Debate Between Classicism and Romanticism ==
On 1 January 1816, in the first issue of "La Biblioteca Italiana", Giordani published his own translation of an article of Madame de Staël with the title On the Manner and Utility of Translations, in which de Stael invited Italians to abandon the isolationism and provincialism of their native literary traditions, to abandon their continued reference to a worn and anachronistic mythology in order to move closer to modern foreign literature. This was felt to be a powerful and provocative accusation of backwardness by literate Italians, who were portrayed as a bunch of erudites who, in the words of de Stael, went around "continually rummaging in the ancient ashes, in order to find perhaps some grain of gold."

"An Italian" responds to De Stael was the title of the article in which Giordani, in the April edition of the magazine, formulated a strong rejection of de Stael's invitation. What possible help could a bunch of foreign authors offer to the resolution of the most urgent task of any literary Italian, which is, of course, the return to linguistic purity? asked Giordani. De Stael's article offered him the opportunity to state the fundamental principle of classicism: the existence of a form of perfection in art which, once attained, could only be either lost in decadence or reattained by going back to the perfect works which had already been realized and discovering what it is in them that makes them the most outstanding creations and expressions of the human imagination and creative skill. Italian writers had already been imitating classical poets for centuries, and the imitation of modern foreign writers would have resulted in the obfuscation of the Italianity of Italian literary expression.

"The sciences are capable of infinite progress and are able to find new truths every day which had been previously unknown", wrote Giordani. " But the progress of the arts is finished when they have found the beautiful and learned how to express it."

Perfection, for Giordani, was reached by the Greek and Latin writers and, later, by the Italians. He admitted that there are many tastes, but believed that these tastes are all conformable to the different characters of the various populations and cultures of the world. And it is precisely for this reason that Italian taste, offspring of Greco-Roman taste, is completely extraneous to that of, e.g., the English or the Germans.

"One can dispute endlessly about whether or not all of that which people admire in English and German poetry is truly beautiful, or if much of it is not, rather false and exaggerated and therefore ugly. But let's suppose that all of it is beautiful; it does not follow that all of it will be beautiful to us Italians, if we mix it in with other things of our own. It is necessary to either cease being Italians, forget our own language, our history, transform our climate and our imagination, or, maintaining these things unchanged, accept that our poetry and our literature must be maintained Italian; but it cannot remain Italian if it is mixed with those northern ideas which have nothing in common and are incompatible with ours....I am not saying that an Italian cannot reasonably desire to learn the poetry and the literature of the northerners, as he can easily do by personally visiting those countries; But I deny that those literatures (beautiful and laudable to those who belong to those countries) can enrich and embellish ours because they are essentially incompatible. It is one thing to go to Japan out of curiosity in order to see almost a different world from ours. It is another thing to come back from there and desire to live like a Japanese among Italians.....Italians should study their own classics, the Latin and Greek writers....."

All of these ideas were later to exercise a profound influence over Leopardi, who, notwithstanding his romanticism in style and tone, was, at heart, a deeply committed classicist in holding (and in stating in many parts of the Zibaldone and elsewhere) that the arts, and indeed humanity itself, had systematically degenerated from a high-point in the Greco-Roman past to a point in the modern scientific world in which true beauty was no longer attainable because of the death of the primitive illusions associated with a natural, non-scientific and non-technological world.

A year later, however, Giordani would read for the first time the tragedies of Shakespeare and end up powerfully impressed. He wrote: "I am reading the works of Shakespeare, which appears to me to be a new world of drama and, like in any new world, I am finding all sorts of things: enormous beauty and substantial misery. But it must be confessed that his delightful creations are great and new." And, in contradiction to his many previous affirmations in writings, he added, "I think these works would be of enormous profit to Italian poets.!!"

== Conclusions ==
In his writings, Pietro Giordani demonstrated a strict adherence to linguistic classicism, to an eloquence balanced and controlled in form. His rhetoric is rarely hollow or empty; there is rigour, participation in cultural and educational problems; there is a strong argument against prejudice and obscurantism; there is an aggressive but not thoughtless or banal anti-clericalism; there is an invitation to participate in and comprehend one's own times through the study of history and economics. For this reason, the idea of literature in Giordani, in spite of the common classicist roots, is very different from that of Monti: the literary enterprise must consist in the affirmation of virtue, the search for truth, and civil education. Poetry must not be an otiose pastime, science must be studied before Latin, teaching must integrate both manual and intellectual work, and the study of contemporary history must come before that of antiquity.

In him, faith in the happiness of humanity, once liberated from prejudices and oppression, alternates with a desolate vision of inevitable human unhappiness without conceding anything to transcendental illusions. This vision solicited Leopardi toward the necessity of dedicating himself to the practical, if not theoretical, overcoming of pessimism, to not letting himself be dominated by a philosophy that inhibits the will.

There is, in Giordani, a contradiction between rhetorical education and the urgency of renewal, as there is in his conviction that the only way to achieve cultural progress in Italian society is through finding a stimulus in the lessons of the ancients. But it was the contradiction of Italian history itself that was expressed in him: not finding any elements of progress within an economically backward and socially stagnant society, he attributed to himself the indisputable value of Italian literary tradition could be, in and of itself, a progressive factor. This explains perhaps a certain restrictedness of horizons and a provincialism which was never overcome.

He himself seems to have been conscious of a certain insufficiency of his work with respect to his capabilities and intellect when he wrote: "If they wish to put a stone over these poor bones, I recommend that they write: Pietro Giordani was never known."

== Bibliography ==
- Giordani, Pietro. Lettere, SI, 1937.
- Idem. Scritti Scelti, Sansoni, Florence, 1961.
- AA. VV., Pietro Giordani in the Second Century after his Birth. CRP, Piacenza, 1974.
- Cecioni, Gabriele (1977). Lingua e Cultura nel Pensiero di Pietro Giordani. Roma: Bulzoni.
- Melosi, Laura (2002). In toga e in camicia. Scritti e carteggi di Pietro Giordani. Lucca: Maria Pacini Fazzi ed.
- Camilletti, Fabio (2017). "Toward an Archaeology of Italian Modernity: Rethinking the Classicist/Romantic Quarrel". In Gabriella Romani; Jennifer Burns (eds.). The Formation of a National Audience in Italy, 1750-1890: Readers and Spectators of Italian Culture. Madison and Teaneck, New Jersey: Fairleigh Dickinson University Press.
