= Parco Virgiliano (Mergellina) =

Public park in Italy

Coordinates: 40°49′48″N 14°13′04″E

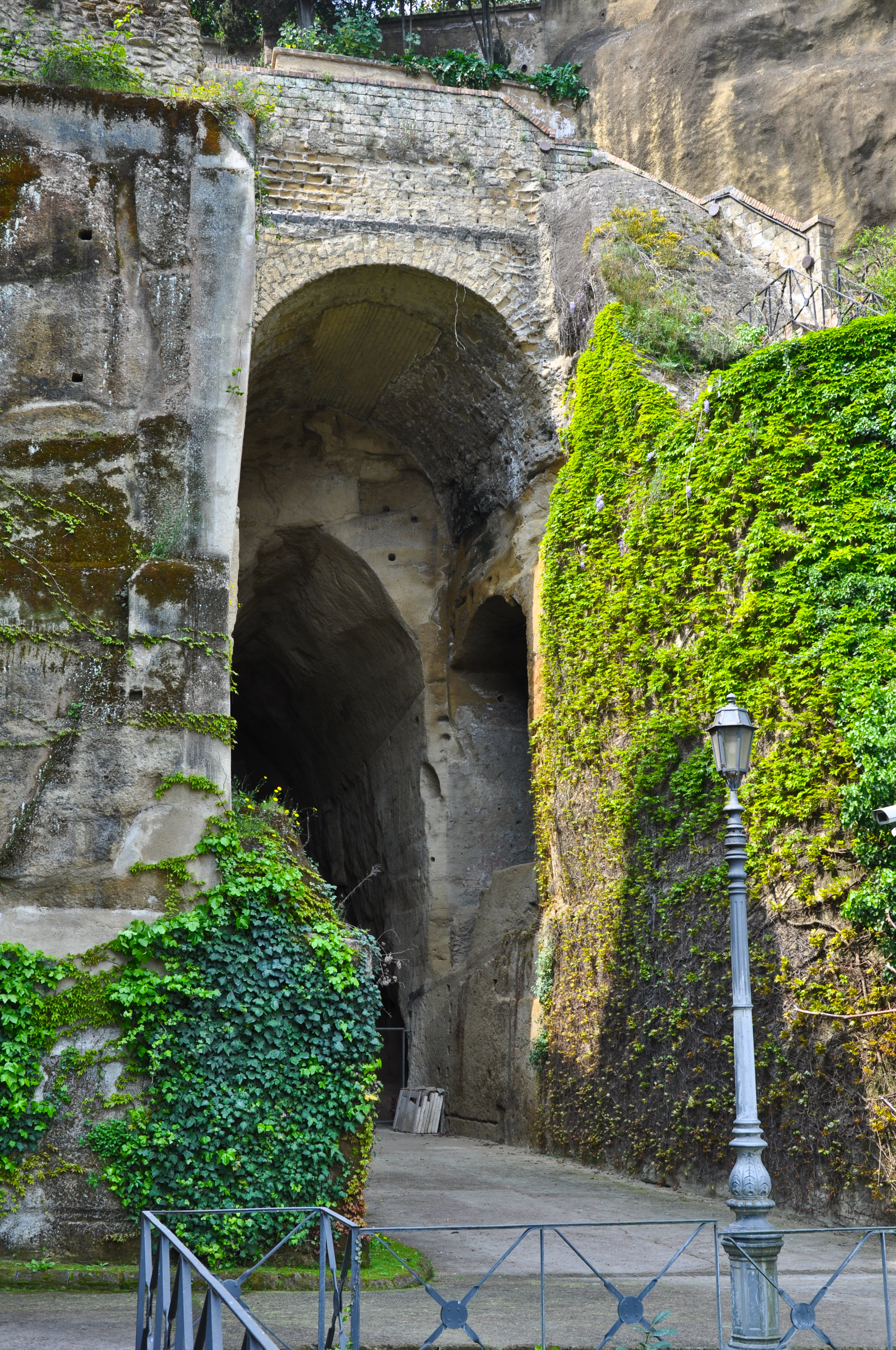
View of the Parco Vergiliano in Naples, at the entrance to the "Neapolitan Crypt."

Parco Vergiliano (not to be confused with Parco Virgiliano at Posillipo) is a public park in Naples, southern Italy. It is located directly across from the Mergellina railway station and in back of the church of Santa Maria di Piedigrotta.

It is a relatively small space and easy to overlook. The site is a monument tribute to the poet Virgil, and a plaque claims that the site is the final resting place of the poet. The site is at the eastern opening of the so-called Neapolitan Crypt, an ancient Roman tunnel that led through the Posillipo hill to connect to a major road leading north to Rome, itself. Legend says that the poet—also renowned as a sorcerer—called the tunnel into existence by his powers. The tunnel was probably the work of Lucius Cocceus Auctus, the Roman engineer who built the nearby Seiano Grotto and many of the fortifications of the Roman Imperial Port in Baia. Parco Vergiliano also contains the authenticated tomb of a more recent poet, Giacomo Leopardi, who died in Naples in 1837.

The "Neapolitan Crypt" is also called, generically, a "grotta" (grotto) and is the reference in various place names in the area such as Piedigrotta ("at the foot of the grotto") and Fuorigrotta ("at the other end of the grotto"). The tunnel, though ancient, was kept up and even expanded in recent centuries and remained in sporadic use until quite late, until superseded by two nearby modern vehicular tunnels around 1900.
