= L'infinito =

1819 poem by Giacomo Leopardi

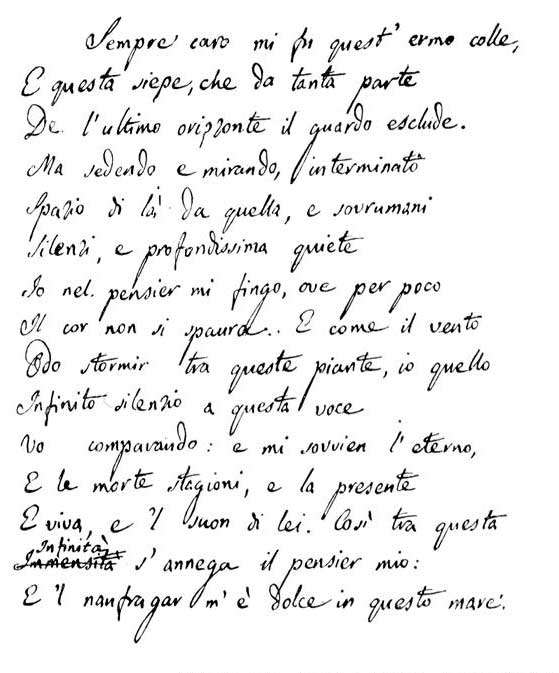
The second hand-written manuscript of L'infinito

"L'infinito" (Italian pronunciation: [liɱfiˈniːto]; English: The Infinite) is a poem written by Giacomo Leopardi probably in the autumn of 1819. The poem is a product of Leopardi's yearning to travel beyond his restrictive home town of Recanati and experience more of the world which he had studied. It is widely known within Italy.

== Themes ==
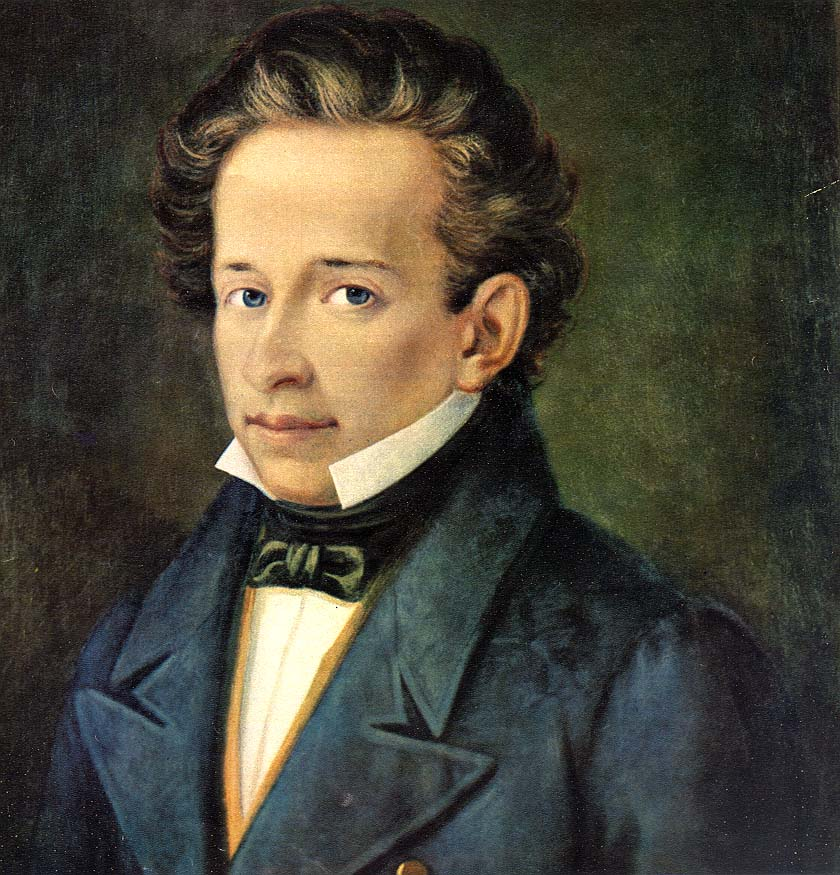
Portrait of Giacomo Leopardi

The poem, though vague and ethereal in its composition, conveys elements of the philosophical and classical worlds, the latter visible in the selection of the word ermo, from ancient Greek rather than using a more conventional solitario to convey the isolatedness of this hill. This personification of natural environment is prominent throughout the poem and is typical of another theme or movement often associated with Leopardi: romanticism. There is also a keen sense of mortality throughout the poem, conveyed in the dying of seasons and drowning of thoughts, akin to Leopardi's belief that he would not live long, a belief that came true when he died at 38.

According to Leopardi, space and time are finite and contain only things that are not infinite: he understands spatial infinity as a negation of physical reality: in his poetry, spaces are interminable, silences are superhuman, stillness is profound. Just as in the Masonic vision, infinity exists in man's interiority or is a mere product of human imagination.

== Original text ==
Sempre caro mi fu quest’ermo colle,
e questa siepe, che da tanta parte
dell’ultimo orizzonte il guardo esclude.
Ma sedendo e mirando, interminati
spazi di là da quella, e sovrumani
silenzi, e profondissima quïete
io nel pensier mi fingo; ove per poco
il cor non si spaura. E come il vento
odo stormir tra queste piante, io quello
infinito silenzio a questa voce
vo comparando: e mi sovvien l’eterno,
e le morte stagioni, e la presente
e viva, e 'l suon di lei. Così tra questa
immensità s’annega il pensier mio:
e 'l naufragar m’è dolce in questo mare.

== Literal English translation ==
Always dear to me was this solitary hill,
and this hedgerow, which from so great a part
of the farthest horizon excludes the sight.
But sitting and gazing,
I frame within my thought limitless
spaces beyond that [hedge], and superhuman
silences, and deepest quiet,
so that my heart almost takes fright.
And as I hear the wind
rustling through these plants, I compare that
infinite silence to this voice:
and eternity comes over me,
and the dead seasons, and the present
and living one, and its sound. Thus amid this
vastness my thought drowns:
and to be shipwrecked is sweet to me in this sea.

== Alternate translation ==
This lonely hill was always dear to me,
and this hedgerow, which cuts off the view
of so much of the last horizon.
But sitting here and gazing, I can see
beyond, in my mind’s eye, unending spaces,
and superhuman silences, and depthless calm,
till what I feel
is almost fear. And when I hear
the wind stir in these branches, I begin
comparing that endless stillness with this noise:
and the eternal comes to mind,
and the dead seasons, and the present
living one, and how it sounds.
So my mind sinks in this immensity:
and foundering is sweet in such a sea.

(translated by Jonathan Galassi)

== Sonnet translation ==
I’ve always loved this solitary hill,
I’ve always loved this hedge that hides from me
So much of what my earthly eyes can see.
For as I sit and gaze, all calm and still,
I conjure up my thoughts; my mind I fill
With distances that stretch out boundlessly
And silences that somehow cannot be
Heard by my heart, which feels a sudden chill.
It seems these rustling leaves, this silence vast
Blend into one. Eternity draws nigh.
The present sounds and seasons, those long past
Become one sea of endless lives and deaths.
My thought is drowned, and yet it does not die:
It plunges into sweet, refreshing depths.

(translated by Z.G., with the title "Boundless Depths")

== Modern usage ==
The poem is recited in the film One Hundred Steps (2000) by the protagonist Impastato, drawing a parallel between Impastato and Leopardi.

== See also ==
- Monte Tabor, the mountain mentioned in the poem.
