= Monte Tabor =

Mountain in Marche, Italy

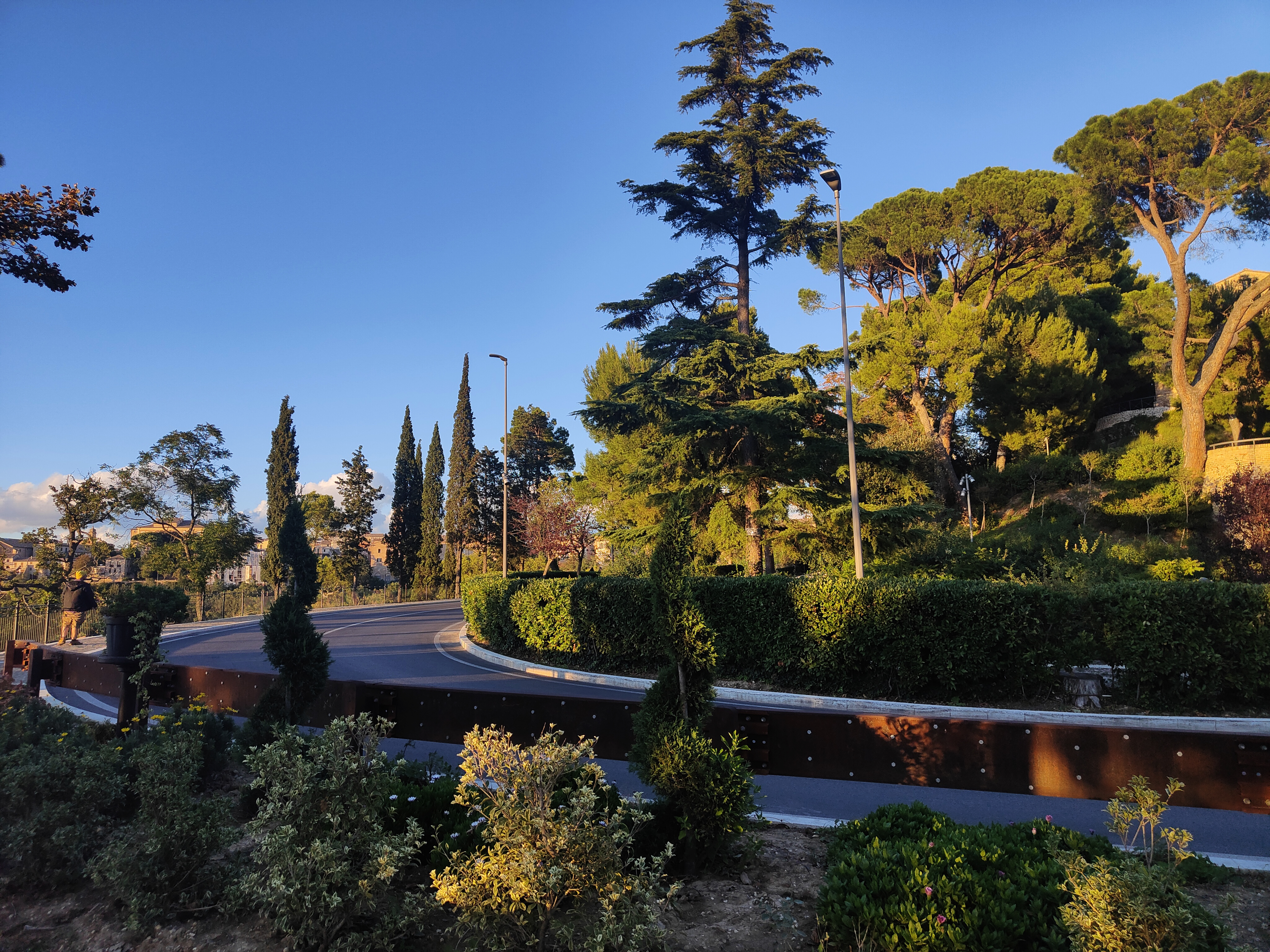
- View of one of the slopes

Highest point
- Elevation: 296 m (971 ft)
- Coordinates: 43°23′52.91″N 13°32′58.78″E

Geography
- Location: Recanati, Marche, Italy

Monte Tabor (Italian pronunciation: [ˈmonte ˈtaːbor]) is a hill in Recanati, Marche, Italy. It is also dubbed "the Hill of Infinity" because it is described as the site of a spiritual epiphany in Giacomo Leopardi's famous poem "L'infinito".

It is named after Mount Tabor in historical Palestine, believed by many Christians to be the site of another spiritual manifestation, the Transfiguration of Jesus.
