= Taber =

Taber may refer to:

== Places ==
- Taber, Alberta, town in Canada
- Municipal District of Taber, a municipal district in Alberta, Canada
- Taber Airport, near the town in Alberta, Canada
- Fort Taber, Civil War-era fort and park in Massachusetts, USA

== Other ==
- Taber (surname), including a list of people with the name
- Taber's, a medical dictionary
- Taber MacCallum (born 1964), American space scientist

== See also ==
- Cardston-Taber-Warner, a provincial electoral district in Alberta, Canada
- Tabor (disambiguation)
