= Tabor College =

Tabor College may refer to:

- Tabor College (Iowa), a defunct institution formerly located in Iowa
- Tabor College (Kansas), a four-year Christian liberal arts institution in Kansas
- Tabor College, Australia

== See also ==
- Tabor Academy (disambiguation)
