= Tavor (disambiguation) =

Tavor is the Modern Hebrew transliteration of תבור, Tabor, the name of Mount Tabor, and often associated with IWI Tavor, an Israeli rifle family.

Tavor may refer to:

== Places ==
- Har Tavor (Mount Tabor), a hill in Israel
- Nahal Tavor (Tavor Stream), a watercourse in Israel
- Kfar Tavor (Tavor Village), a village in Israel

== People ==
- Tavor, an Italian musician in the band Ufomammut
- Moshe Tavor (1917-2006), Israeli Nazi hunter
- Raffi Tavor, an Israeli actor

== Other uses ==
- 894th "Tavor" Search and Rescue Battalion, a unit of the IDF in the Israeli Home Front Command
- Beit Tavor (Tabor House), a historic building in Jerusalem
- A brand name for Lorazepam, a drug belonging to the benzodiazepine family of tranquillizers

== See also ==
- Tabor (disambiguation)
