= Giacomo Leopardi =

Italian poet, philosopher, and writer (1798–1837)

- Posthumous portrait (1897) by Stanislao Ferrazzi
- Born: Giacomo Taldegardo Francesco di Sales Saverio Pietro Leopardi; 29 June 1798; Recanati, Papal States
- Died: 14 June 1837 (aged 38); Naples, Kingdom of the Two Sicilies
- Resting place: Parco Virgiliano, Naples
- Occupations: Poet; philosopher; essayist; philologist; dialogist

Education
- Education: Self-taught, with the help of his father Monaldo's tutors, and friends like Giordani

Philosophical work
- Era: 19th-century philosophy
- Region: Western philosophy; Italian philosophy
- School: Classicism; Enlightenment; Romanticism; Existentialism
- Notable students: Carducci; Michelstaedter; Saba; Schopenhauer; Nietzsche; Beckett; Mainländer; Sanctis; Camus; Unamuno
- Main interests: Homer; Plato; Menander; Cicero; Lucretius; Horace; Virgil; Lucian; Ecclesiastes; Dante; Petrarch; Tasso; Hume; Gibbon; Rousseau; Voltaire; D'Holbach; Alfieri; Foscolo
- Notable works: Canti; Operette morali; Zibaldone
- Notable ideas: Philosophical pessimism

Signature
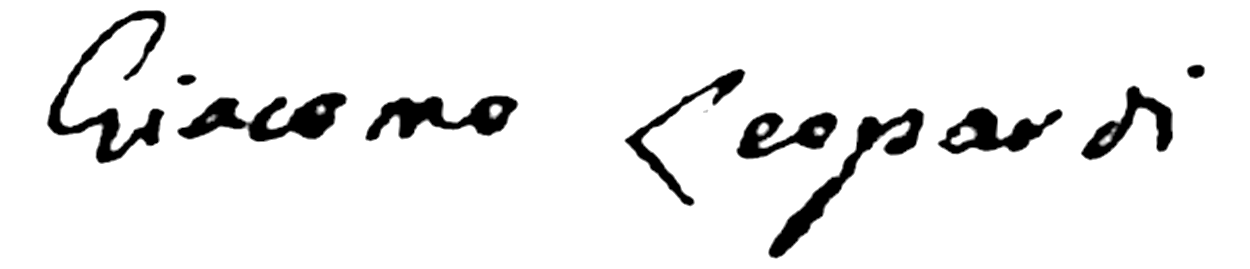

Count Giacomo Taldegardo Francesco Salesio Saverio Pietro Leopardi (29 June 1798 – 14 June 1837) was an Italian philosopher, poet, essayist, and philologist.

Regarded as a major figure in 19th-century Italian literature, he is often cited alongside Alessandro Manzoni as a central figure of Italian Romanticism, despite holding distinct and frequently opposing views on religion and aesthetics. Raised in Recanati, a secluded town within the conservative Papal States, Leopardi gained access to an extensive library that enabled him to engage with classical literature and Enlightenment philosophy with more depth. His poetic and prose works explore themes of existential pessimism, materialism, human suffering, and the nature of happiness, which earned him recognition as a radical thinker. His development of a distinct lyrical style and his philosophical writing, notably collected in the Zibaldone, established his reputation in international literary and among philosophical scholars.

== Biography ==
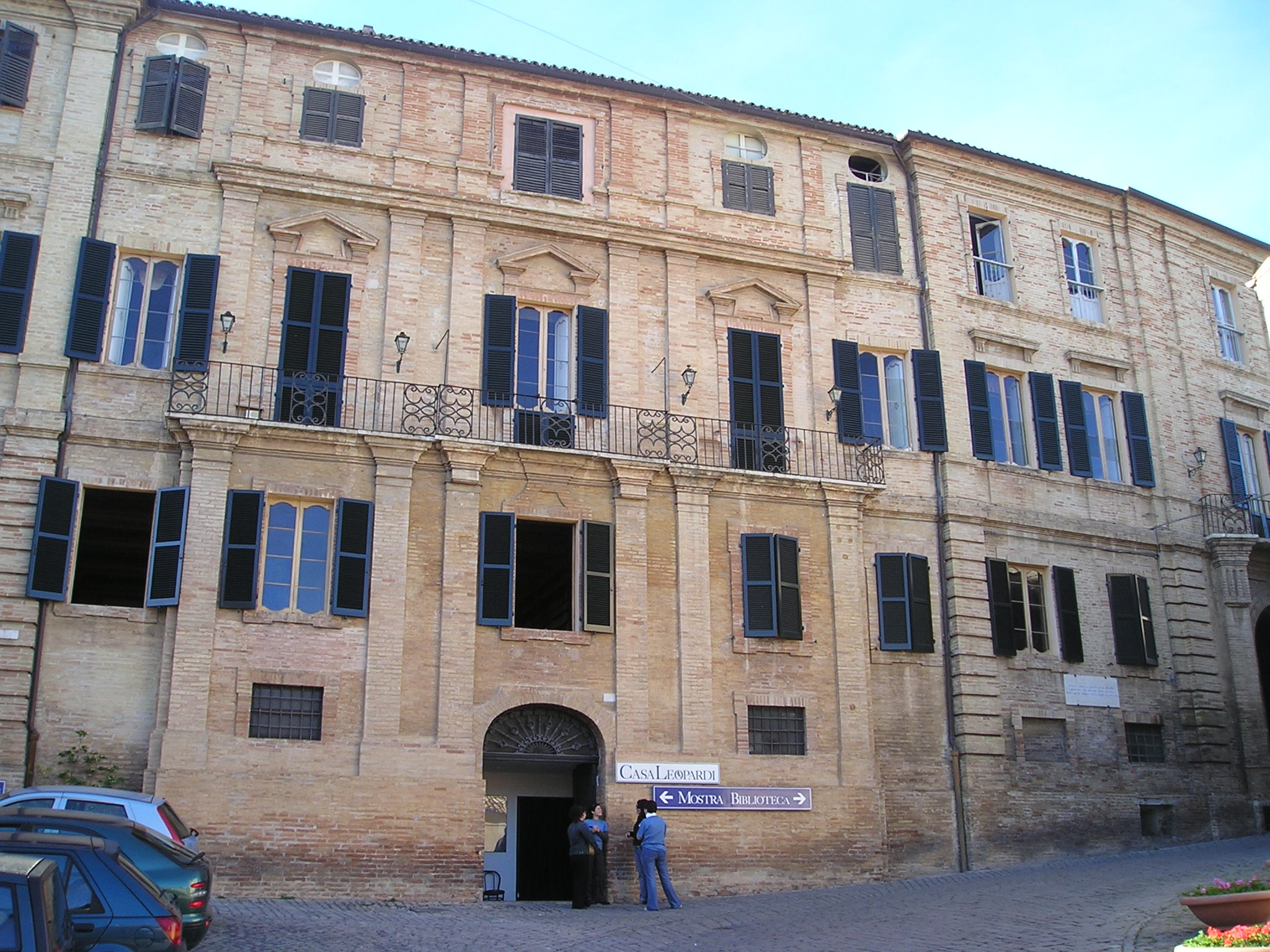
The Palazzo Leopardi in Recanati

Leopardi was born into a local noble family in Recanati, in the Marche, at the time ruled by the papacy. His father, Count Monaldo Leopardi, who was fond of literature and a committed reactionary, remained an advocate of traditional ideals. His mother, Marchioness Adelaide Antici Mattei, was a cold and authoritarian woman, obsessed with rebuilding the family's financial fortunes, which had been destroyed by her husband's gambling addiction. A rigorous discipline of religion and economy reigned in the home. However, Giacomo's happy childhood, which he spent with his younger brother Carlo Orazio and his sister Paolina, left its mark on the poet, who recorded his experiences in the poem Le Ricordanze.

Domenico Morelli, Giacomo Leopardi, 1842–1845, based mainly on death mask of 1837

Following a family tradition, Leopardi began his studies under the tutelage of two priests, but his thirst for knowledge was quenched primarily in his father's rich library. Initially guided by Father Sebastiano Sanchini, Leopardi undertook vast and profound reading. These "mad and most desperate" studies included an extraordinary knowledge of classical and philological culture – he could fluently read and write Latin, ancient Greek and Hebrew – but he lacked an open and stimulating formal education.

Between the ages of twelve and nineteen, he studied constantly, driven also by a need to escape spiritually from the rigid environment of the paternal palazzo. His continual studies undermined an already fragile physical constitution, and his illness, probably Pott's disease or ankylosing spondylitis, denied him youth's simplest pleasures. He was 1.65 meters (5 ft 5 in) tall, but his health problems led him to stand only 1,41 m (4 feet 8 inches) tall.

In 1817 the classicist Pietro Giordani arrived at the Leopardi estate. He became a lifelong friend of Giacomo, who derived from this a sense of hope for the future. Meanwhile, his life at Recanati weighed on him increasingly, to the point where he attempted to escape in 1818, but he was caught by his father and brought home. Thereafter, relations between father and son continued to deteriorate, and Giacomo was constantly monitored by the rest of the family.

When in 1822 he was briefly able to stay in Rome with his uncle, he was deeply disappointed by its atmosphere of corruption and decadence and by the hypocrisy of the Church. He was impressed by the tomb of Torquato Tasso, to whom he felt bound by a common sense of unhappiness. While Foscolo lived tumultuously between adventures, amorous relations, and books, Leopardi was barely able to escape from his domestic oppression. To Leopardi, Rome seemed squalid and modest when compared to the idealized image that he had created of it. He had already suffered disillusionment in love at home, with his cousin Geltrude Cassi. Meanwhile, his physical ailments continued to worsen.

In 1824, a bookstore owner, Stella, called him to Milan, asking him to write several works, including Crestomazia della prosa e della poesia italiane. He moved during this period between Milan, Bologna, Florence and Pisa. In 1827 in Florence, Leopardi met Alessandro Manzoni, although they did not see things eye to eye. He paid a visit to Giordani and met the historian Pietro Colletta.

In 1828, physically infirm and worn out by work, Leopardi refused the offer of a professorship in Bonn or Berlin, made by the Ambassador of Prussia in Rome. In the same year, he had to abandon his work with Stella and return to Recanati. In 1830, Colletta offered him a chance to return to Florence, thanks to a financial contribution from the "Friends of Tuscany". The subsequent printing of the Canti allowed him to live away from Recanati until 1832. Leopardi found kindred company among the liberals and republicans seeking to liberate Italy from its yoke to Austria. Although his idiosyncratic and pessimistic ideas made him a party of one, he railed against Italy's "state of subjection" and was "in sympathy with the ideals of constitutionalism, republicanism and democracy, and supportive of movements urging Italians to fight for their independence."

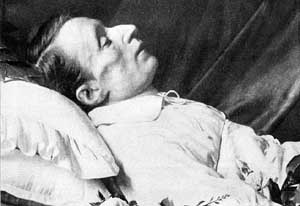
Leopardi on his deathbed

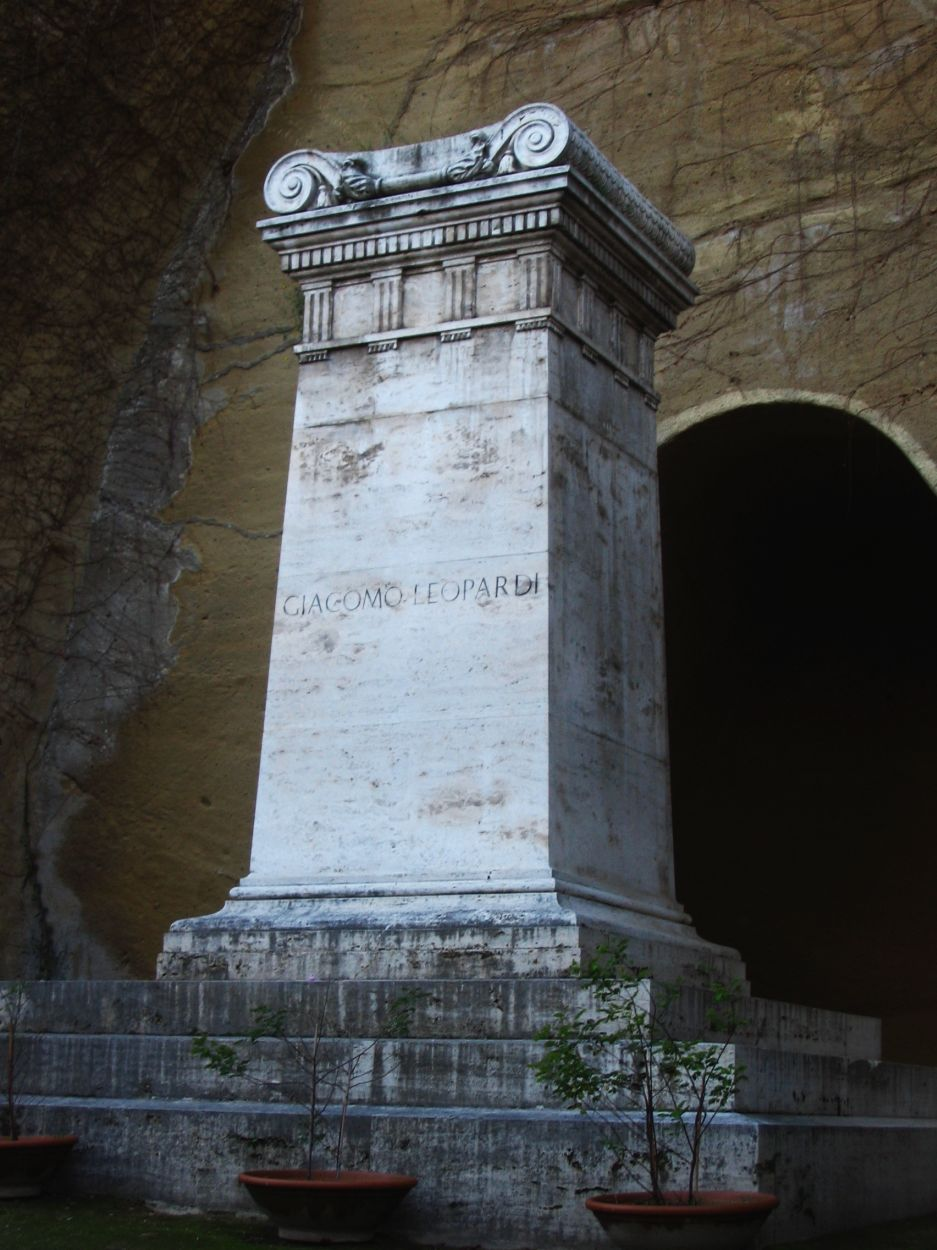
The tomb of Leopardi at Parco Virgiliano, Naples

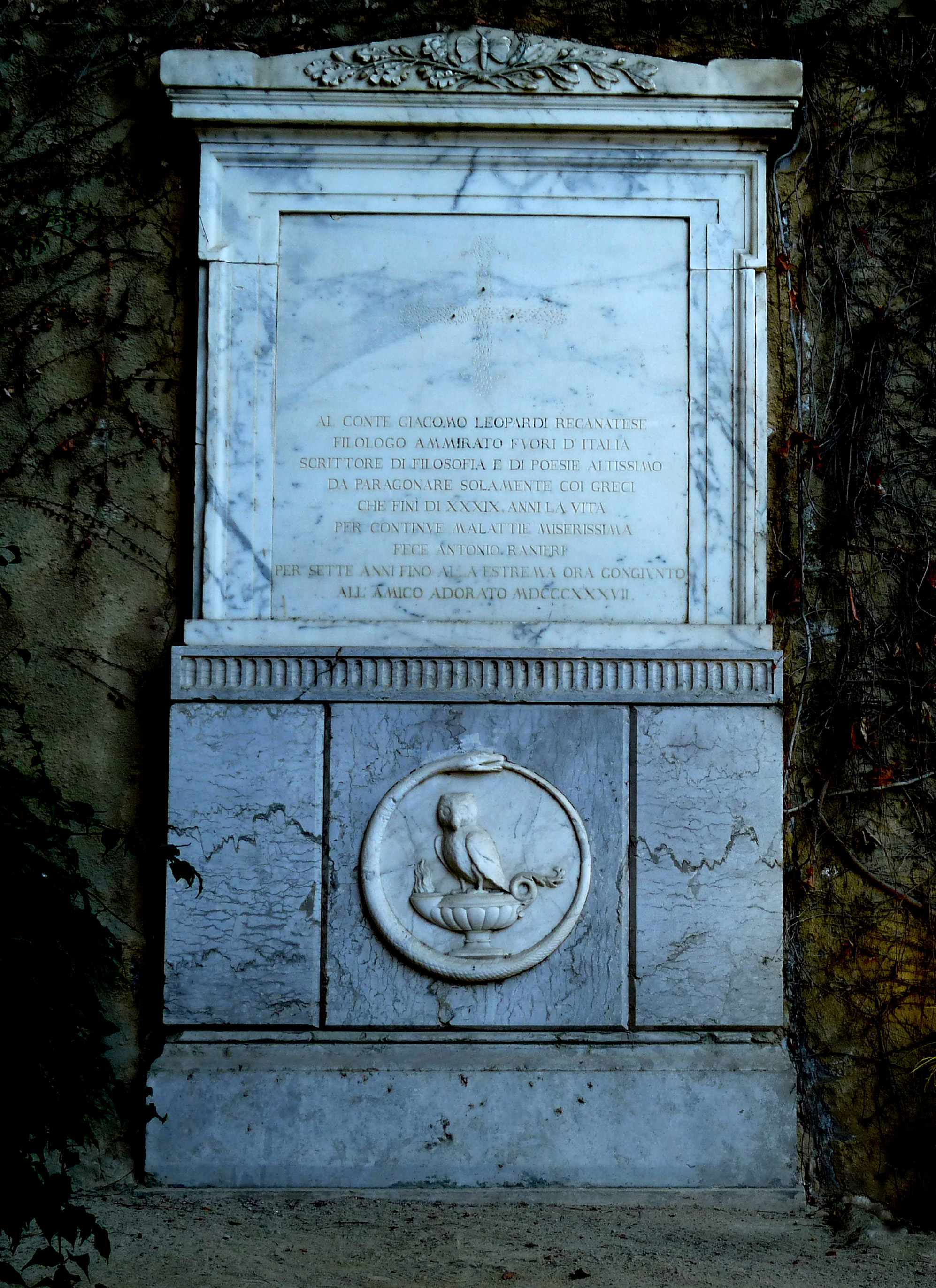
The original tombstone for Leopardi from the Church of San Vitale

Later, he moved to Naples near his friend Antonio Ranieri, hoping to benefit physically from the climate. Here he became a close friend of the Freemason Alessandro Poerio, while since 1817 he had an intimate and confidential correspondence with the Freemason Pietro Giordani.

Leopardi died in Naples during the cholera epidemic of 1837, the immediate cause probably being pulmonary oedema or heart failure, due to his fragile physical condition. Thanks to Antonio Ranieri's intervention with the authorities, Leopardi's remains were not buried in a common grave (as the strict hygiene regulations of the time required), but in the atrium of the Church of San Vitale at Fuorigrotta. According to many, the body actually ended up in the Fontanelle cemetery or the Cemetery for cholera victims ("cimitero dei colerosi"), and the account provided by Ranieri is false. In 1900 his tomb was moved to the Parco Virgiliano and declared a national monument.

There has been speculation in academic circles that Leopardi may have had homoromantic tendencies. His intimate friendships with other men, particularly Ranieri, involved expressions of love and desire beyond what was typical even of Romantic poets. In an account of his time in Tuscany, it was written that he "became frenzied about love" whenever in the presence of the handsome younger brother of a woman he and Ranieri both admired (Fanny Targioni-Tozzetti), and that when so frenzied he would direct his sentiments towards Ranieri. In 1830, Leopardi received a letter from Pietro Colletta, nowadays interpreted as a declaration of masonic brotherhood. Leopardi's close friend Antonio Ranieri was a Master Mason. Nonetheless, over the course of his life Leopardi had more than twenty-five sentimental female friendships, such as the ones with Teresa Carniani Malvezzi or Charlotte Napoléone Bonaparte.

The Leopardi family share the origin of Tomasi's family, at the time of the Roman emperor Constantine the Great.

== Poetical works ==
=== First academic writings (1813–1816) ===
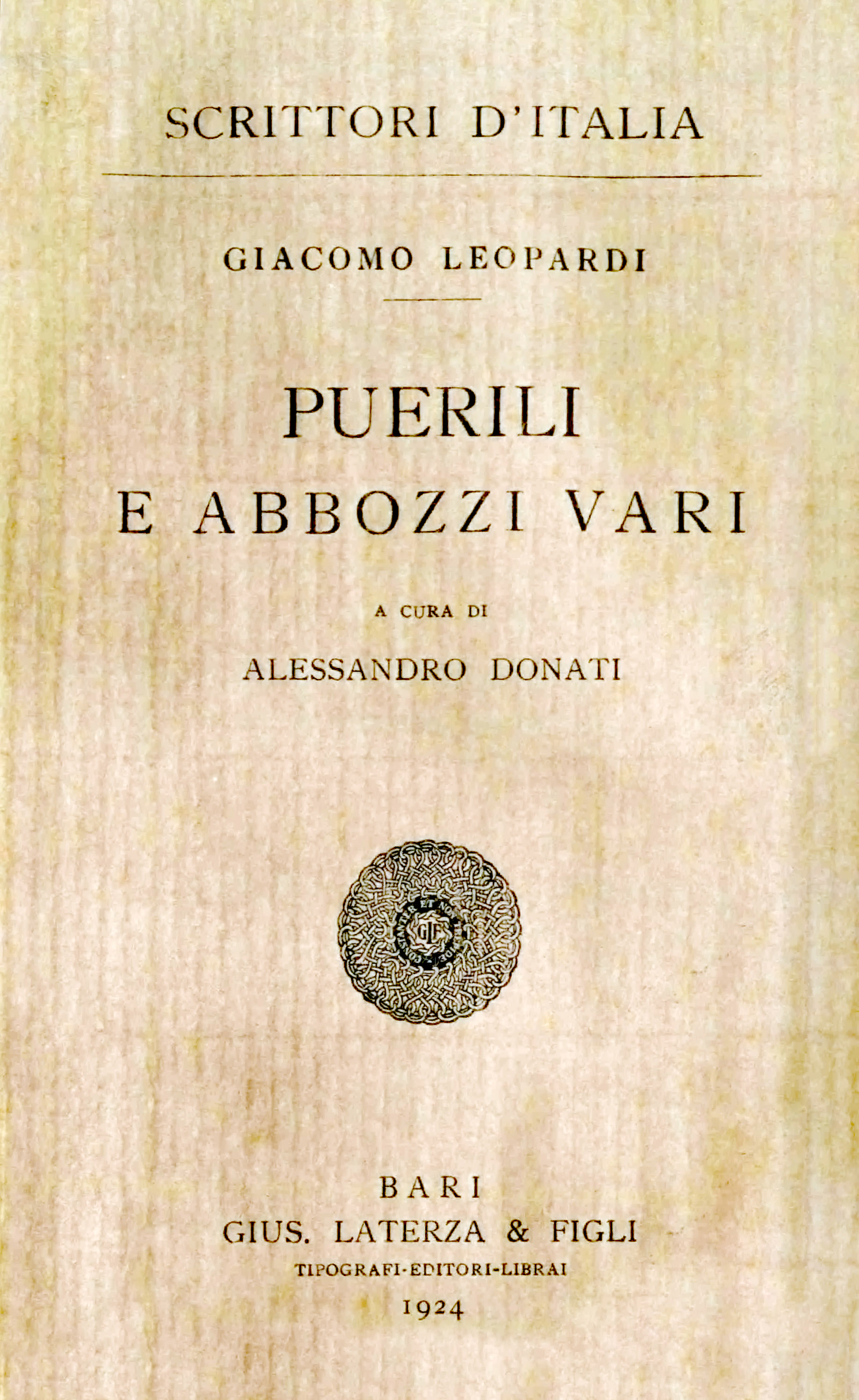
Puerili e abbozzi vari, a collection of Leopardi's early writings from 1809

These were rough years for Leopardi, as he started developing his concept of Nature. At first, he saw this as "benevolent" to mankind, helping to distract people from their sufferings. Later, by 1819, his idea of Nature became dominated by a destructive mechanism.

Up to 1815, Leopardi was essentially an erudite philologist. Only thereafter did he begin to dedicate himself to literature and the search for beauty, as he affirms in a famous letter to Giordani of 1817. Pompeo in Egitto ("Pompey in Egypt", 1812), written at the age of fourteen, is an anti-Caesar manifesto. Pompey is seen as the defender of republican liberties. Storia dell'Astronomia ("History of Astronomy", 1813) is a compilation of all of the knowledge accumulated in this field up to the time of Leopardi. From the same year is Saggio sopra gli errori popolari degli antichi ("Essay on the popular errors of the ancients"), which brings the ancient myths back to life. The "errors" are the fantastic and vague imaginings of the ancients. Antiquity, in Leopardi's vision, is the infancy of the human species, which sees the personifications of its myths and dreams in the stars.

The year 1815 saw the production of Orazione agli Italiani in Occasione della Liberazione del Piceno ("Oration to the Italians on the liberation of Piceno"), a paean to the 'liberation' achieved by Italy after the intervention of the Austrians against Murat. In the same year he translated Batracomiomachia (the war between the frogs and mice in which Zeus eventually sends in the crabs to exterminate them all), an ironic rhapsody which pokes fun at Homer's Iliad, once attributed to the epic poet himself.

In 1816 Leopardi published Discorso sopra la vita e le opere di Frontone ("Discourse on the life and works of Fronto"). In the same year, however, he entered a period of crisis. He wrote L'appressamento della morte, a poem in terza rima in which the poet experiences death, which he believes to be imminent, as a comfort. Meanwhile, there began other physical sufferings and a serious degeneration of his eyesight. He was acutely aware of the contrast between the interior life of man and his incapacity to manifest it in his relations with others.

Leopardi abandoned his philological studies and moved increasingly toward poetry by reading Italian authors of the 14th, 16th and 17th centuries, as well as some of his Italian and French contemporaries. His vision of the world underwent a change: he ceased to seek comfort in religion, which had permeated his childhood, and became increasingly inclined toward an empirical and mechanistic vision of the universe inspired by John Locke among others.

In 1816, the idylls Le rimembranze and Inno a Nettuno ("Hymn to Neptune") were published. The second, written in ancient Greek, was taken by many critics as an authentic Greek classic. He also translated the second book of the Aeneid and the first book of the Odyssey. In the same year, in a letter to the compilers of the Biblioteca Italiana (Monti, Acerbi, Giordani), Leopardi argued against Madame de Staël's article inviting Italians to stop looking to the past, but instead study the works of foreigners, so as to reinvigorate their literature. Leopardi maintained that "knowing", which is acceptable, is not the same thing as "imitating", which is what Madame de Stael demanded, and that Italian literature should not allow itself to be contaminated by modern forms of literature, but look to the Greek and Latin classics. A poet must be original, not suffocated by study and imitation: only the first poet in the history of humanity could have been truly original, since he had had no one to influence him. It was, therefore, necessary to get as close to the originals as possible, by drawing inspiration from one's own feelings, without imitating anyone.

Thanks to his friendship with Giordani, with whom, in 1817, he had begun a prolific correspondence, his distancing from the conservatism of his father became even sharper. It was in the following year that he wrote All'Italia ("To Italy") and Sopra il monumento di Dante ("On the Monument of Dante"), two very polemical and classical patriotic hymns in which Leopardi expressed his adherence to liberal and strongly secular ideas.

In the same period, he participated in the debate, which engulfed the literary Europe of the time, between the classicists and the romanticists, affirming his position in favour of the first in the Discorso di un Italiano attorno alla poesia romantica ("Discourse of an Italian concerning romantic poetry").

In 1817 he fell in love with Gertrude Cassi Lazzari and wrote Memorie del primo amore ("Memories of first love"). In 1818 he published Il primo amore and began writing a diary which he would continue for fifteen years (1817–1832), the Zibaldone.

=== The first canti (1818) ===
First edition of Canti by Leopardi

All'Italia and Sopra il monumento di Dante marked the beginning of the series of major works. In the two canti, the concept of "excessive" or "over-civilization", which is deleterious for life and beauty, first makes its appearance. In the poem All'Italia, Leopardi laments the fallen at the Battle of Thermopylae (480 BC, fought between the Greeks under Leonidas and the Persians under Xerxes), and evokes the greatness of the past. In the second canto, he turns to Dante and asks him for pity for the pathetic state of his fatherland. In the great canti which follow (forty-one, including fragments), there is a gradual abandonment of the reminiscences, of literary allusions and of conventionalisms.

In 1819, the poet attempted to escape from his oppressive domestic situation by travelling to Rome. But he was caught by his father. In this period, his personal pessimism evolves into the peculiar philosophical pessimism of Leopardi. Le Rimembranze and L'appressamento della morte also belong to this early period of the art of Leopardi.

=== The Idilli (1819–1821) ===
The six Idilli ("Idylls"), namely Il sogno ("The dream"), L'Infinito ("The Infinite"), La sera del dì di festa ("The evening of the feast day"), Alla Luna ("To the Moon"), La vita solitaria ("The solitary life") and Lo spavento notturno ("Night-time terror"), followed hard upon the first canti. Il sogno is still Petrarchesque, while the others which followed are the fruit of a more mature and independent art. Leopardi establishes with nature a sort of accord which attenuates the pain and discomfort.

In all of the idylls, the initial sparks, offered by memory or by the sweetness of nature, transmute their colours into the intuition of universal pain, of the transience of things, of the oppressive weight of eternity, of the inexorable passing of time, of the blind power of nature.

==== L'Infinito ====
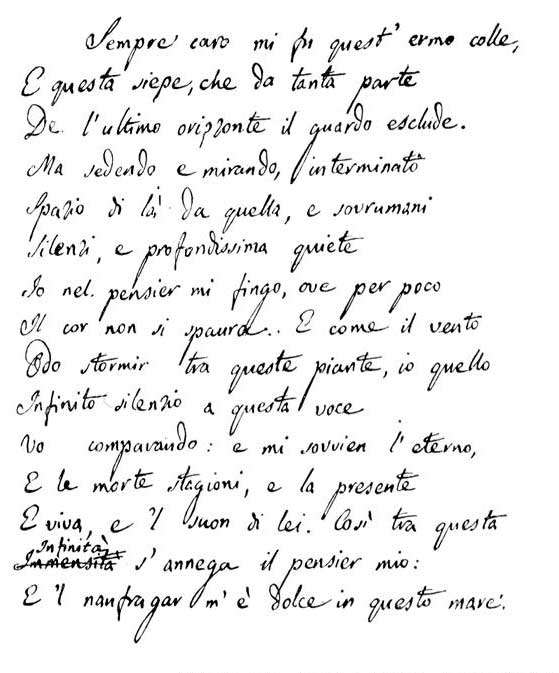
Original manuscript of L'Infinito

The highest expression of poetry is reached in Leopardi in L'Infinito, which is at once philosophy and art, since in the brief harmony of the verses are concentrated the conclusions of long philosophical meditations. The theme is a concept which the mind can only conceive with extreme difficulty. The poet narrates an experience he often has when he sits in a secluded place on a hill. His eyes cannot reach the horizon, because of a hedge surrounding the site; his thought, instead, is able to imagine spaces without limits:

"Sempre caro mi fu quest'ermo colle,
E questa siepe, che da tanta parte
Dell'ultimo orizzonte il guardo esclude."

"Always dear to me was this solitary hill,
and this hedgerow, which from so great a part
of the farthest horizon excludes the sight."

Another interpretation suggests that this hill represents the heights human thought achieves, but at the top, there is a hedge that prevents one from seeing the ultimate horizon, beyond death and existence. Thus, this hedge can be interpreted as signifying the limits of human understanding regarding human existence in the Universe. This is why the poem begins with "Sempre caro mi fu" which can be translated as "It was always precious for me". The silence is deep; when a breath of wind comes, this voice sounds like the voice of present time, and by contrast, it evokes all times past, and eternity. Thus, the poet's thought is overwhelmed by new and unknown suggestions, but "il naufragar m'è dolce in questo mare" ("shipwreck / seems sweet to me in this sea." English translation by A. S. Kline).

=== The Canzoni (1820–1823) ===
Leopardi returns to the evocation of ancient eras and exhorts his contemporaries to seek in the writings of the classics the noble ancient virtues.

==== Ad Angelo Mai ====
On the occasion of the discovery of the De Republica of Cicero by Mai, Leopardi wrote the poem Ad Angelo Mai ("To Angelo Mai") in which he invokes the figures of many Italian poets, from Dante and Petrarch to Torquato Tasso, whom he felt so near to himself, to his contemporary Vittorio Alfieri.

==== Nelle nozze della sorella Paolina ====
In the lyrical Nelle nozze ("On the marriage of my sister Paolina"), an event that failed to happen, in the course of wishing happiness for his sister, the poet uses the opportunity to exalt the strength and the virtue of the women of antiquity and to denigrate his own time because it did not allow one to be virtuous and happy, since only after death are those who have lived a morally good life praised.

==== Ad un vincitor di pallone ====
The canto Ad un vincitor di pallone ("To the winner of a ballgame") expresses disdain for the tedium of a life that is nothing but a monotonous repetition of human affairs and to which only danger can restore value: only he who has been near the gates of death is able to find sweetness in life.

==== Bruto minore ====
In Bruto minore ("Brutus the Younger"), Brutus the assassin of Caesar is depicted as a man who has always believed in honour, virtue and liberty and who has ultimately sacrificed everything for these ideals. He has come to the realization, too late to change things, that everything was done in vain, that everything has been pointless, and that he will even die dishonoured and disgraced for his well-intentioned actions.

His meditations bring him to the conclusion that morality is meaningless; Jove rewards only the selfish and plays arbitrary games with hapless mankind. Man is more unhappy than the rest of the animal kingdom because the latter do not know that they are unhappy and therefore do not meditate on the question of suicide and, even if they could, nothing would prevent them from carrying out the act without hesitation.

==== Ultimo canto di Saffo ====
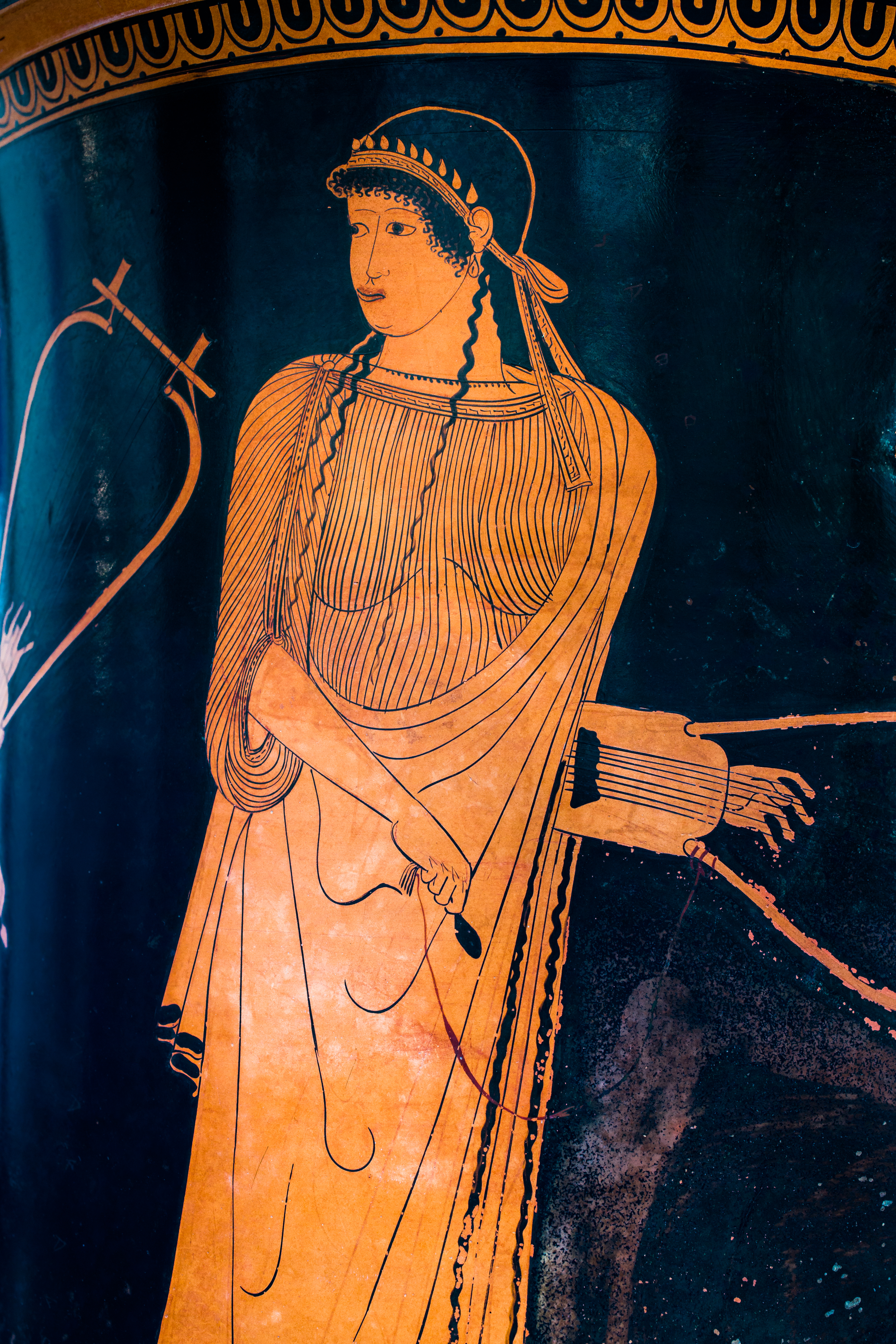
Sappho on a fifth-century BC red-figure vase by the Brygos Painter

Sappho is also a tragic figure. Sappho loved the light (the loved one, according to the legend, was named Phaon, in Greek Φάων, from φῶς, light), but her life was made of shadow; she loved nature and beauty, but nature has been like an evil stepmother to her and she, who is sensitive, cultured and refined, is closed in the prison of a deformed body. Nor can the greatness of her genius help to release her from this horror.

In Sappho, Leopardi sees himself retarded, but in reality, the poet of Lesbos was neither deformed nor unhappy as she is depicted by Leopardi, who based his depiction on a false traditional belief. Sappho knew, tasted, and sang of beauty and love more than was possible for Leopardi. But the resignation to unhappiness, to pain and to solitude, and the renunciation of the joys of life, sounds in the verses of Leopardi like the sincere sigh of a feminine soul.

The canto begins as a sweet apostrophe to the placid nights, once dear to the serene poet, but the words turn rapidly to a violent evocation of nature in tempest which echoes her inner turmoil. The anguishing and accusative questions which Leopardi poses to a destiny which has denied beauty to the miserable Sappho are cut short by the thought of death. After having wished to the man she has loved in vain that little bit of happiness which is possible to attain on this earth, Sappho concludes by affirming that of all the hopes for joy, of all the illusions, there remains to await her only Tartarus.

==== Alla primavera and Al conte Carlo Pepoli ====
The canti Alla primavera ("To Spring") and Al conte Carlo Pepoli ("To Count Carlo Pepoli") emerge from the same spiritual situation. The first laments the fall of the great illusions ("gli ameni inganni") and the imaginary mythological worlds of the past, which embellished and enriched the fantasy of man. The second decries the loss of happiness that has resulted.

In Alla primavera, Leopardi praises the ancient times when the nymphs populated the fields, the woods, the springs, the flowers and the trees. Although the lyrical style is apparently classical, it is also pervaded by the characteristic dissatisfaction with the presence of the romantics. Leopardi, here, romanticizes the pure intentions of the Greeks, since he was actually romantic in his sentiments and classical in his imagination and intellect.

In the Epistolario a Carlo Pepoli, Leopardi attempts to prove to his friend the thesis (reminiscent of Buddhism) according to which, since life has no other aim but happiness and since happiness is unattainable, all of life is nothing but an interminable struggle. But he who refuses to work is oppressed by the tedium of life and must seek distraction in useless pastimes. Moreover, those who dedicate themselves to poetry, if they have no fatherland, are tormented more than those who do by a lack of freedom because they fully appreciate the value of the idea of nationhood.

At this point, a disillusioned Leopardi considers abandoning poetry for philosophy, but without any hope of glory. He has resigned himself to the certainty of pain and of boredom to which mankind is condemned and he therefore believes it necessary to abandon the illusions and poetry in order to speculate on the laws and destiny of the universe.

==== Alla sua donna ====
In 1823, he wrote the canto Alla sua donna ("To his woman"), in which he expresses his ardent aspiration for a feminine ideal which, with love, might render life beautiful and desirable. During his youth, he had dreamt in vain of encountering a woman who embodied such a feminine ideal: a platonic idea, perfect, untouchable, pure, incorporeal, evanescent, and illusory.

It is a hymn not to one of Leopardi's many "loves", but to the discovery that he had made—at a high point of his life from which he would later decline—that what he had been seeking in the lady he loved was "something" beyond her, that was made visible in her, that communicated itself through her, but was beyond her. This hymn to Woman ends with this invocation:

| "Se dell'eterne idee L'una sei tu, cui di sensibil forma Sdegni l'eterno senno esser vestita, E fra caduche spoglie Provar gli affanni di funerea vita; O s'altra terra ne' supremi giri Fra' mondi innumerabili t'accoglie, E più vaga del Sol prossima stella T'irraggia, e più benigno etere spiri; Di qua dove son gli anni infausti e brevi, Questo d'ignoto amante inno ricevi." | "If you are one of those eternal Ideas, that the eternal mind scorns to clothe in solid form, to endure the pain of our deathly life among fallen bodies, or if you are received in another earth, in the highest circles, among the innumerable worlds, and a star closer and brighter than the sun illuminates you, who breathe a purer air: accept your unknown lover, in this hymn from this world of unhappy and brief days." |

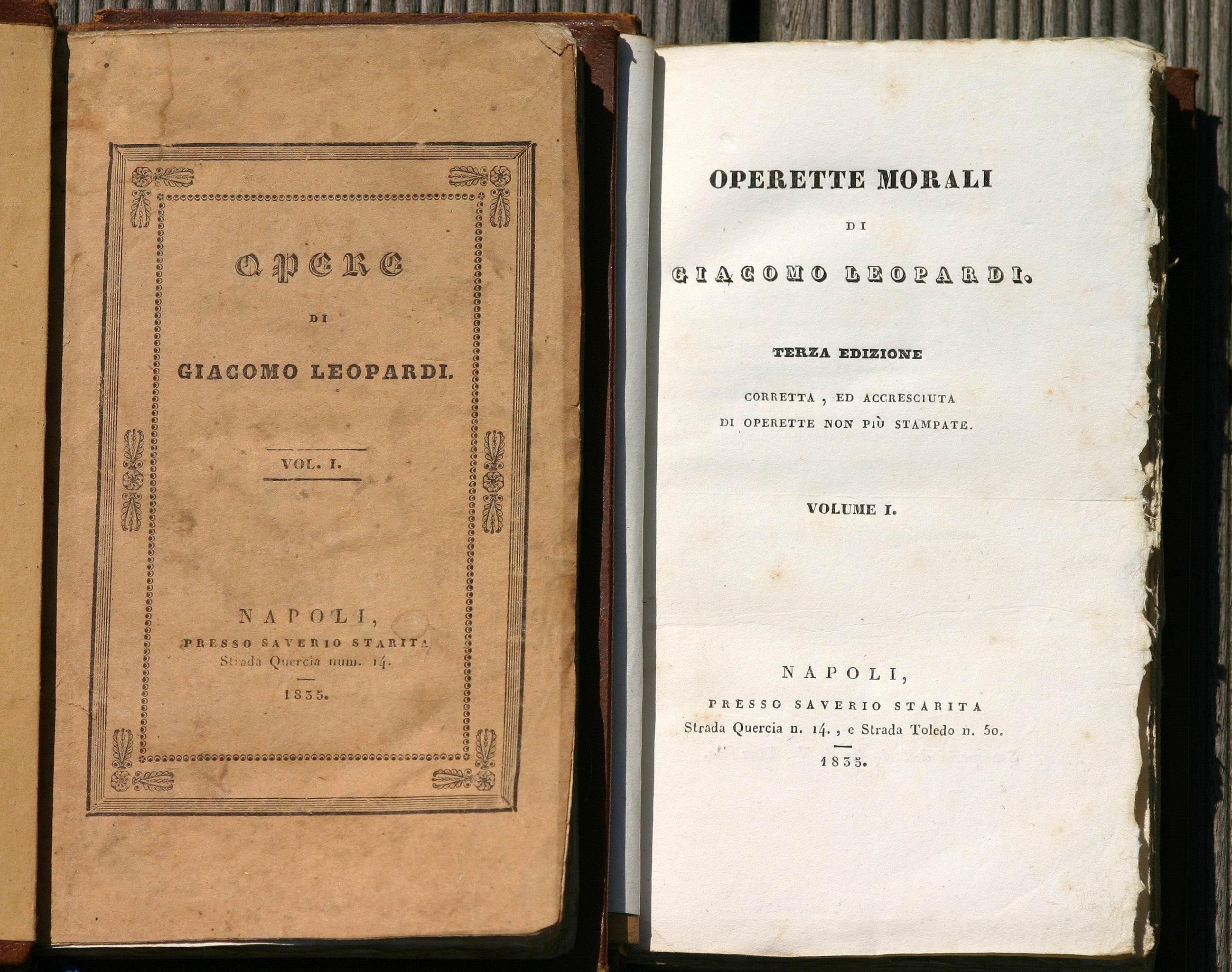
Cover of the Operette morali in the last edition of Leopardi's Works in his lifetime, Naples 1835

=== Operette morali (1824) ===
Between the years 1823 and 1828, Leopardi set aside lyric poetry in order to compose his prose magnum opus, Operette morali ("Small Moral Works"), which consists (in its final form) of a series of 24 innovative dialogues and fictional essays treating a variety of themes that had already become familiar to his work by then. One of the most famous dialogues is: Dialogo della Natura e di un Islandese, in which the author expresses his main philosophical ideas.

=== Canti Pisano-Recanatesi (1823–1832) ===
After 1823, Leopardi abandoned the myths and illustrious figures of the past, which he now considered to be transformed into meaningless symbols, and turned to writing about suffering in a more "cosmic" sense.

==== Il Risorgimento ====
In 1828, Leopardi returned to lyric poetry with Il Risorgimento ("Resurgence"). The poem is essentially a history of the spiritual development of the poet from the day in which he came to believe that every pulse of life had died out in his soul to the moment in which the lyrical and the sentimental were reawakened in him. A strange torpor had rendered him apathetic, indifferent to suffering, to love, to desire, and to hope. Life had seemed desolate to him until the ice began to melt and the soul, reawakening, finally felt the revivification of the ancient illusions. Having reconquered the gift of sentiment, the poet accepts life as it is because it is revived by the feeling of suffering which torments his heart and, so long as he lives, he will not rebel against those who condemn him to live. This recovered serenity consists in the contemplation of one's own conscience of one's own sentiments, even when desolation and despair envelop the soul.

Leopardi rejoices to have rediscovered in himself the capacity to be moved and to experience pain, after a long period of impassibility and boredom. With Risorgimento, lyricism is reawakened in the poet, who composes canti, generally brief, in which a small spark or a scene is expanded, extending itself into an eternal vision of existence. He revokes images, memories and moments of past happiness.

==== A Silvia ====
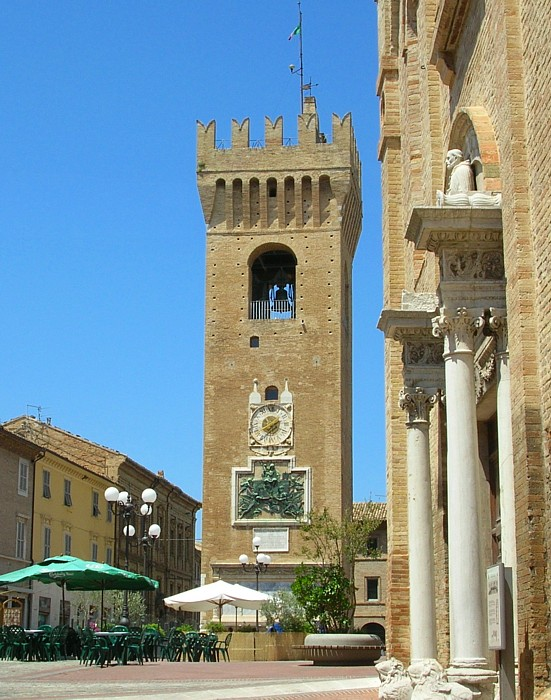
The tower of Recanati, present on Il passero solitario

In 1828, Leopardi composed perhaps his most famous poem, A Silvia ("To Silvia"). The young lady of the title—possibly the daughter of a servant in the Leopardi household—is the image of the hopes and illusions of the young poet, destined to succumb far too early in the struggle against reality, just as the youth of Silvia is destroyed by tuberculosis, the "chiuso morbo". It is often asked whether Leopardi was actually in love with this young woman, but to seek confirmation in biographical evidence is to miss the point of the poem. A Silvia is the expression of a profound and tragic love of life itself, which Leopardi, despite all the suffering, the psychological torments and the negative philosophizing, could not suppress in his spirit. This poem demonstrates why Leopardi's so-called "nihilism" does not run deep enough to touch the well-spring of his poetry: his love of man, of nature, and of beauty. However, the accusation Leopardi makes against Nature is very strong, as being responsible for the sweet dreams of youth and for the subsequent suffering, after "the appearance of truth" (l'apparir del vero, v.60) has shattered them.

==== Il passero solitario ====
The canto Il passero solitario ("The Lonely Sparrow") is of a classical perfection for the structure of the verses and for the sharpness of the images. Leopardi contemplates the bounty of nature and the world which smiles at him invitingly, but the poet has become misanthropic and disconsolate with the decline of his health and youth and the deprivation of all joy. He senses the feast which nature puts forth to him, but is unable to take part in it and foresees the remorse which will assail him in the years to come when he will regret the youthful life that he never lived. In this sense, he is alone just like, or worse than, the sparrow, since the latter lives alone by instinct, while the poet is endowed with reason and free will.

==== Le Ricordanze ====
In 1829, at Recanati, where he was constrained to return, against his wishes, because of increasing infirmity and financial difficulties, the poet wrote Le Ricordanze ("Memories"), perhaps the poem where autobiographical elements are the most evident. It narrates the story of the painful joy of the man who feels his sentiments to be stirred by seeing again places full of childhood and adolescence memories. These sentiments now confront a horrible and merciless reality and deep regret for lost youth. The ephemeral happiness is embodied in Nerina (a character perhaps based on the same inspiration as Silvia, Teresa Fattorini).

Nerina and Silvia are both dreams, evanescent phantasms; life for Leopardi is an illusion, the only reality being death. The woman, Silvia, Nerina, or "la sua donna" is always only the reflection of the poet himself, since life itself is, for him, an elusive and deceptive phantasm.

==== La quiete dopo la tempesta ====
In 1829, Leopardi wrote La quiete dopo la tempesta ("The Calm After the Storm"), in which the light and reassuring verses at the beginning evolve into the dark desperation of the concluding strophe, where pleasure and joy are conceived of as only momentary cessations of suffering and the highest pleasure is provided only by death. It also delegates his dignity onto the crowd nor grieving himself on the sorrows he is obsessed and afterwards, his prowess dominates.

==== Il sabato del villaggio ====
The same year's Il sabato del villaggio ("Saturday in the village"), like La quiete dopo la tempesta, opens with the depiction of the calm and reassuring scene of the people of the village (Recanati) preparing for Sunday's rest and feast. Later, just as in the other poem, it expands into deep, though brief and restrained, poetic-philosophical considerations on the emptiness of life: the joy and illusion of expectation must come to an unsatisfactory end in the Sunday feast; likewise, all the sweet dreams and expectations of youth will turn into bitter disillusion.

==== Canto notturno di un pastore errante dell'Asia ====
Around the end of 1829 or the first months of 1830, Leopardi composed the Canto notturno di un pastore errante dell'Asia ("Night-time chant of a wandering Asian sheep-herder"). In writing this piece, Leopardi drew inspiration from the reading of Voyage d'Orenbourg à Boukhara fait en 1820, by the Russian baron Meyendorff, in which the baron tells of how certain sheep-herders of central Asia belonging to the Kirghiz population practised a sort of ritual chant consisting of long and sweet strophes directed at the full moon. The canto, which is divided into five strophes of equal length, takes the form of a dialogue between a shepherd and the moon. The canto begins with the words "Che fai tu Luna in ciel? Dimmi, che fai, / silenziosa Luna?" ("What do you do, Moon in the sky? Tell me, what do you do, / silent Moon?"). Throughout the entire poem, in fact, the moon remains silent, and the dialogue is transformed therefore into a long and urgent existential monologue of the sheep-herder, in desperate search of explanations to provide a sense to the pointlessness of existence. The two characters are immersed in an indeterminate space and time, accentuating the universal and symbolic nature of their encounter: the sheep-herder represents the human species as a whole and his doubts are not contingent—that is, anchored to a here and now—but are rather characteristic of man at all times; the moon, on the other hand, represents Nature, the "beautiful and terrible" force that fascinates and, at the same time, terrifies the poet.

The shepherd, a man of humble condition, directs his words to the moon in a polite but insistent tone, seething with melancholy. It is precisely the absence of response on the part of the celestial orb which provokes him to continue to investigate, ever more profoundly, into the role of the moon, and therefore into that of humanity, with respect to life and the world, defining ever more sharply the "arid truth" so dear to the poetry of Leopardi. In the first strophe, in fact, the sheep-herder, even while defining the moon as silent, actually expects a response from it and discovers many analogies between his own condition and that of the moon: both of them arise in the morning, follow their always self-identical paths and finally stop to rest. The life of the moon, as much as that of the sheep-herder, seems completely senseless. There appears, however, in the middle of this strophe, a very important distinction: the course of human life is finite and its passage, similar to that of a "vecchierel bianco" (Petrarch, Canzoniere, XVI), terminates tragically in the "horrid abyss" of death. Such a condition, which is defined in the second strophe as a condition of profound suffering ("se la vita è sventura, perché da noi si dura?") is extremely different from that of the Moon, which seems instead to be eternal, "virgin", and "intact".

In the third strophe, the sheep-herder turns again to the moon with renewed vigour and hope, believing that the orb, precisely because of this privileged extra-worldly condition, can provide him with the answers to his most urgent questions: what is life? What could possibly be its purpose since it is necessarily finite? What is the first cause of all being? But the moon, as the sheep-herder learns quickly, cannot provide the answers to these questions even if it knew them, since such is nature: distant, incomprehensible, mute if not indifferent to the concerns of man. The shepherd's search for sense and happiness continues all the way to the final two strophes. In the fourth, the sheep-herder turns to his flock, observing how the lack of self-awareness that each sheep has allows it to live out, in apparent tranquillity, its brief existence, without suffering or boredom. But this idea is ultimately rejected by the sheep-herder himself in the final strophe, in which he admits that, probably, in whatever form life is born and manifests itself, whether moon, sheep or man, whatever it is capable of doing, life is equally bleak and tragic.

In this period, Leopardi's relations with his family are reduced to a minimum, and he is constrained to maintain himself on his own financially. In 1830, after sixteen months of "notte orribile" (awful night), he accepted a generous offer from his Tuscan friends, which enabled him to leave Recanati.

=== The last Canti (1832–1837) ===
In the last canti, philosophical investigation predominates, with the exception of Tramonto della Luna ("Decline of the Moon"), which is a decisive return to idyllic lyricism.

==== Il pensiero dominante ====
In 1831, Leopardi wrote Il pensiero dominante ("The Dominating Thought"), which exalts love as a living or vitalizing force in itself, even when it is unrequited. The poem, however, features only the desire for love without the joy and the vitalizing spirit and, therefore, remains thought, illusion. Leopardi destroys everything, condemns everything, but wishes to save love from the universal miasma and protect it at least within the profundity of his own soul. The more desolate the solitude which surrounds him, the more tightly he grasps onto love as the faith in his idealized, illusory, eternal woman ("sua donna") who placates suffering, disillusion and bitterness. The poet of universal suffering sings of a good which surpasses the ills of life and, for an instant, seems to become the singer of possible happiness. But the idea of death as the only hope for man returns, since the world offers only two beautiful things: love and death.

Il pensiero dominante represents the first ecstatic moment of love, which almost nullifies the awareness of human unhappiness. It is worth the price of tolerating the suffering of a long life in order to experience the joy of such beauty. Il pensiero dominante and Il risorgimento are the only poems of joy written by Leopardi, though even in those two poems there always reappears, inextinguishable, the pessimism which sees in the object of joy a vain image created by the imagination.

==== Amore e Morte ====
The concept of the love-death duality is taken up again in the 1832 canto Amore e Morte ("Love and Death"). It is a meditation on the torment and annihilation which accompanies love. Love and death, in fact, are twins: one is the generator of all things beautiful and the other puts an end to all ills. Love makes strong and cancels the fear of death, and when it dominates the soul, it makes it desire death. Some, who are won over by passion, will die for it happily. Others kill themselves because of the wounds of love. But happiness consists in dying in the drunkenness of passion. Of the two twins, Leopardi dares to invoke only death, which is no longer symbolized by the horrid Ade of Saffo, but by a young virgin who grants peace for eternity. Death is the sister of love and is the great consoler who, along with her brother, is the best that the world can offer.

==== Consalvo ====
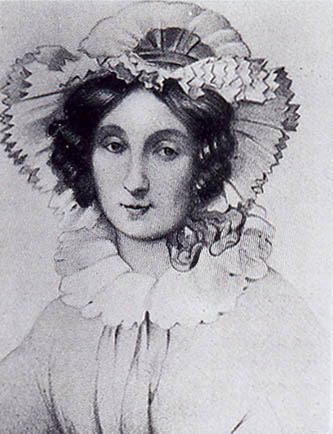
Fanny Targioni Tozzetti

Also in 1832, inspired by a 17th-century poem by Girolamo Graziani titled Il Conquisto di Granata ("The Capture of Granada"), Leopardi wrote Consalvo. Consalvo obtains a kiss from the woman he has long loved unrequitedly only when, gravely injured, he is at the point of death. Consalvo is different from the other canti in that it has the form of a novella in verse or of a dramatic scene. It is the fruit of the sentimental and languid literature which characterized much of the romanticism outside of Italy.

In the early 20th century, the poem was placed into a musical setting as a symphonic poem of the same title by the young Italian flautist Nicholas Laucella during a premiere performance at Carnegie Hall with the New York Philharmonic in 1911.

==== Aspasia ====
Written in 1834, Aspasia emerges, like Consalvo, from the painful experience of desperate and unrequited love for Fanny Targioni Tozzetti. Aspasia-Fanny is the only real woman represented in the poetry of Leopardi. Aspasia is an able manipulator whose perfect body hides a corrupt and prosaic soul. She is the demonstration that beauty is dishonest.

The poet, vainly searching for love, takes his revenge on destiny and the women who have rejected him, above all Targioni, whose memory continues to disturb the poet after more than a year away from her. The memory of the woman loved in vain constantly returns, but the canto, inspired by disdain for the provocative and, simultaneously, distancing behaviour of the woman, also expresses resignation to one's fate and the pride of having been able to recover one's own independence. Aspasia, in her limitedness as a woman, cannot grasp the profundity of masculine thought.

==== A se stesso ====
"A se stesso" (To himself) is an 1833 canto in which Leopardi talks to his heart. The last deceit, love, is dead too. He thought that love was one of the few things that made life worth living, but he changed his mind after his beloved Fanny's refusal. She, moreover, was in love with Antonio Ranieri, Leopardi's best friend, who remained with the poet until the end. His desire, his hope, and his "sweet deceits" have ended. His heart has beaten all his life, but it's time for it to stop beating and stay still. There is no place for hope anymore. All he wants is to die, because death is the only good gift nature has given to human beings. In "Love and Death", love was still considered a good thing because when you are in love, you have stronger feelings; you feel alive in an always new way. Now he has become sceptical also about love, because if he can't have Fanny, nothing remains for him in life. He just wants to die, to make all the suffering end. Death is a gift, as it is the end of all human pain, which is inevitable because it's in the essence of men; it's in the cruel project of nature. The last verse is "e l'infinita vanità del tutto", which means "and the infinite vanity of the whole", and it indicates the inanity of human life and the human world.

==== Sopra un bassorilievo antico sepolcrale ====
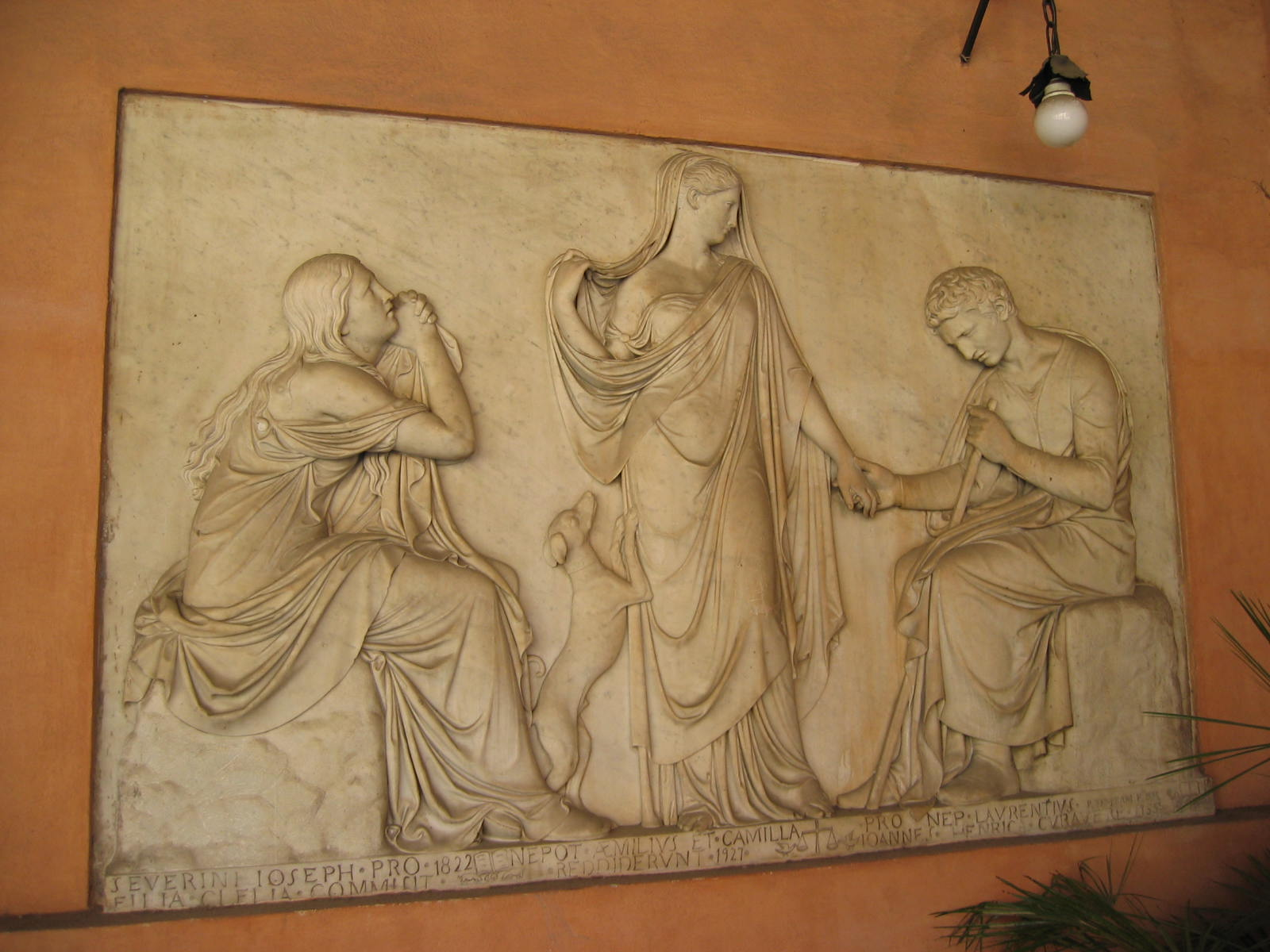
Pietro Tenerani: Monument to Clelia Severini (1825), which inspired the poem.

In the canto Sopra un bassorilievo antico sepolcrale ("Over an Ancient Sepulchre Bas-relief"), a young woman has died and is represented in the act of saying goodbye to her loved ones. The poet weighs the pros and cons of death, remaining in doubt about whether the young woman's destiny is good or bad.

Leopardi, even while being highly conscious of the indifference of nature, never ceased entirely to love it. In these verses, the poet poses challenging and pointed questions to nature, enumerating the ills and sufferings which, because of death, are inflicted on humanity. Under the influence of love, the poet had apparently found happiness at least in death (Il pensiero dominante, Amore e morte). Now, instead, even this last illusion has fallen, and he sees nothing but unhappiness everywhere.

==== Sopra il ritratto di una bella donna ====
Sopra il ritratto di una bella donna scolpito nel monumento sepolcrale della medesima ("On the portrait of a beautiful woman sculpted in her sepulchral monument") is basically an extension of the above.

The poet, drawing his inspiration from a funerary sculpture, evokes the image of a beautiful woman and compares her breathtaking beauty to the heart-rendingly sad image that she has become; one that is no more than mud, dust and skeleton. As well as being centred on the transience of beauty and of human things, the poem points to the specular antinomy between human ideals and natural truth. Leopardi does not deny—if anything, he emphasizes—the beauty of the human species in general, and by the end of the poem extends his point to all possible forms of beauty, intellectual as well as aesthetic. However, this universal beauty remains unattainable to a human nature that is nothing but "polvere e ombra" ("dust and shadow"), and that may touch—but never possess—the ideals that it perceives, remain rooted in the natural world in which it was born, as well as in its demands.

==== La ginestra ====
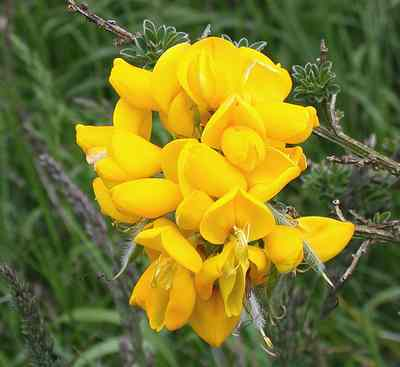
Broom

In 1836, while staying near Torre del Greco in a villa on the hillside of Vesuvius, Leopardi wrote his moral testament as a poet, La Ginestra ("The Broom"), also known as Il Fiore del Deserto ("The flower of the desert"). The poem consists of 317 verses and uses free strophes of hendecasyllables and septuplets as its meter. It is the longest of all the Canti and has an unusual beginning. In fact, among all the Leopardian canti, only this one begins with a scene of desolation, to be followed by an alternation between the enchantment of the panorama and of the starry night sky. On the literary level, it is the maximum realization of that anti-idyllic "new poetic" with which Leopardi had already experimented from the 1830s.

Leopardi, after having described the nothingness of the world and of man with respect to the universe; after having lamented the precariousness of the human condition threatened by the capriciousness of nature, not as exceptional evils but as continuous and constant; and after having satirized the arrogance and the credulity of man, who propounds ideas of progress and hopes, even while knowing he is mortal, to render himself eternal, concludes with the observation that reciprocal solidarity is the only defence against the common enemy which is nature (see Operette morali, "Dialogo di Plotino e Porfirio").

In this canto, in which Leopardi expresses his vast thought about mankind, history, and nature, autobiographical elements can be found: both direct (the places described are those which surround the poet in his late years) and indirect, in the image of a man who is poor, weak, but courageous enough to be aware of his real condition. The humble plant of ginestra, living in desolate places without surrendering to the force of Nature, resembles this ideal man, who rejects any illusions about himself and does not invoke from Heaven (or Nature) an impossible help.

Vesuvius, the great mountain which brings destruction, dominates the entire poem. The only attainable truth is death, toward which man must inexorably advance, abandoning every illusion and becoming conscious of his own miserable condition. Such awareness will placate mutual hatred.

It is a vast poem, constructed with many alternations of tone, from the painting of the volcano threatening destruction and of extensions of infertile lava, to the ideological argumentation, to the cosmic sparks which project the nothingness of the earth and of man in the immensity of the universe, to the vision of the infinite passage of centuries of human history on which the immutable threat of nature has always weighed, to the notes dedicated to the "flower in the desert", in which are compressed complex symbolic meanings: pity toward the sufferings of man and the dignity which should be characteristic of man when confronted with the invincible force of a nature which crushes him.

An essential change occurs with the Ginestra, which closes the poetic career of Leopardi along with Il tramonto della Luna, which takes up the old themes of the fall of youthful illusions. The poem reiterates and reaffirms the sharp anti-optimistic and anti-religious polemic, but in a new and democratic register. Here, Leopardi no longer denies the possibility of civic progress: he seeks to construct an idea of progress founded precisely on his pessimism.

==== Il tramonto della Luna ====
Il tramonto della Luna ("The Waning of the Moon"), the last canto, was composed by Leopardi in Naples shortly before his death. The moon wanes, leaving nature in total darkness, just as youth passes away, leaving life dark and derelict. The poet seems to presage the imminence of his own death.

In 1845, Ranieri published the definitive edition of the Canti according to the will of the author.

=== Other poems ===
==== Palinodia al marchese Gino Capponi ====
In the Palinodia al marchese Gino Capponi ("Palinody to Marquis Gino Capponi"), Leopardi fakes a retraction ("Palinodia") of his pessimism. The work, written in 1835, was intended to be satirical (he first believes that man is unhappy and miserable, but now progress has made him reconsider his position), but the thought of the inevitable destruction to which nature condemns everything leads him to express bitter conclusions in spite of himself. Regarding this work, Marquis Capponi wrote in a letter to Leopardi that he shared, at least in part, many of his ideas and thanked him for the "noble verses". However, in a letter addressed to Viesseux, he expressed himself in rather different terms: "Now it behoves that I write [back] to that damned hunchback who has put it into his head to mock me."

==== Paralipomeni della Batracomiomachìa ====
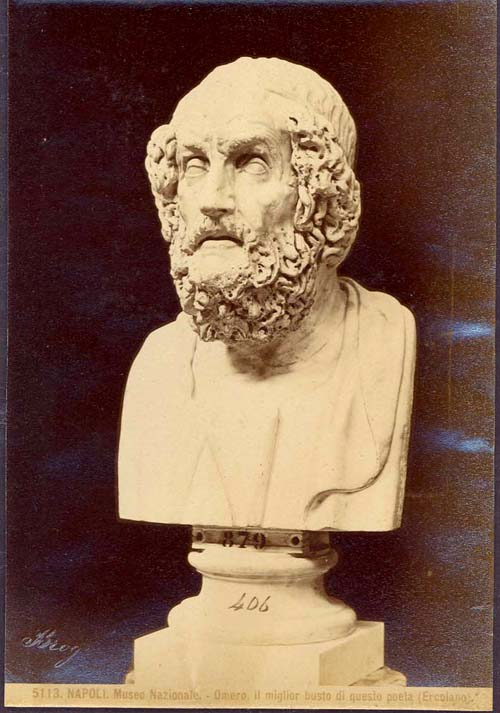
Bust of Homer

The satiric tone adopted by Leopardi through much of the Operette morali is also evinced in some of his late poetic texts, such as the Palinodia and I nuovi credenti. But the clearest demonstration of his mastery of this art form is probably the Paralipomeni della Batracomiomachia, a brief comic-heroic poem of eight stanzas of eight lines each. Leopardi wrote it between 1831 and 1835, beginning it during his last stay in Florence and finishing it in Naples. The publication took place, posthumously, in Paris in 1842, provoking a universal reaction of outrage and condemnation, as much for the cutting and anti-heroic representation of the events of the Risorgimento as for the numerous materialistic philosophical digressions.

The term Paralipòmeni is Greek for "things left undone or unsaid". Batracomiomachìa means "war between the frogs and the mice". Batracomiomachia was also the title of a pseudo-Homeric poem which was actually written in the 4th or 5th century BC and translated by Leopardi between 1815 and 1826. The title, therefore, alludes to an integration of the original work, which is taken up again where it left off, and the narrative progresses. The subject is a fable regarding the conflict between the mice that inhabit the nation of Topaia and the invading crabs. But behind the plot, there is hidden a robust, sarcastic and polemical motivation. The animals and their doings have an allegorical value. In the crabs, portrayed unsympathetically and with monstrous characteristics, are to be recognized as the Austrians; in the mice, sometimes generous but mostly ingenuous and cowardly, the liberal Italians. The poem represents the historical events that took place between 1815 and 1821: the climate of the Restoration desired by the Holy Alliance and the fruitless attempts at the insurrection of 1820–21. Even the revolutionary movements of 1831 are included by Leopardi, who was able to follow them by way of the moderate Tuscan circles which he frequented and who perhaps provided him with the inspiration for the work.

The adoption of the poetic genre required the abandonment of the lyric style and the adoption of a narrative pace marked by a constant critical-satirical tension toward the ideological and philosophical beliefs of contemporary culture: Christian spiritualism, faith in progress, and anthropocentrism. Even the slogans of the political struggle of the liberals are derided, both in their expression of expectation of foreign intervention and in their faith in the model of a constitutional monarchy. In this fashion, the Paralipomeni represent another part of Leopardi's polemical war with the present, and above all an exceptional sally into the territory of historical/political commentary, generally not confronted by Leopardi in a direct form. Of the Italian Risorgimento, he delineates the fundamental limits here with an extraordinary tempestivity: the tendency to compromise with ancient interests and constituted powers, the vanity, the opportunism, the ideological ingenuousness, the lack of an opportune pragmatic awareness. The style generally renounces the expressive concentration of the lyric texts and extends itself in a wide and relaxed discursive pace, with alterations between adventurous moments and ferociously caricatural and polemical points, and between description and philosophical digressions.

=== Pensieri (1837) ===
The Zibaldone di pensieri, cover of the 1900 edition

In March 1837, shortly before his death, Leopardi announced that he would gather into one volume some "thoughts" ("pensieri") on man and society. Such a collection was supposed to be part of a French edition of the complete works of Leopardi. A few months later (on 14 June) the poet died, leaving the work incomplete, and the fragments were published by his friend Ranieri, who also provided the title.

The bulk of the contents of Pensieri are derived from the Zibaldone. The tone is sharply argumentative with respect to humanity, which Leopardi judges to be malevolent, and it almost seems as if the poet wants to take his final revenge on the world.

== Philosophical works ==
=== The Zibaldone ===
Pensaments by Leopardi, a 1912 Catalan edition of the Pensieri

The Zibaldone di pensieri (see also Commonplace book#Zibaldone) is a collection of personal impressions, aphorisms, philosophical observations, philological analyses, literary criticism and various types of notes which was published posthumously in seven volumes in 1898 with the original title of Pensieri di varia filosofia e di bella letteratura (Miscellaneous Thoughts on Philosophy and Good Literature).

The publication took place thanks to a special governmental commission presided over by Giosuè Carducci on the occasion of the centennial anniversary of the poet's birth. It was only in 1937, after the republication of the original text enriched with notes and indices by the literary critic Francesco Flora, that the work definitively took on the name by which it is known today.

In the Zibaldone, Leopardi compares the innocent and happy state of nature with the condition of modern man, corrupted by an excessively developed faculty of reason which, rejecting the necessary illusions of myth and religion in favour of a dark reality of annihilation and emptiness, can only generate unhappiness. The Zibaldone contains the poetic and existential itinerary of Leopardi himself; it is a miscellanea of philosophical annotations, schemes, entire compositions, moral reflections, judgements, small idylls, erudite discussions and impressions. Leopardi, even while remaining outside of the circles of philosophical debate of his century, was able to elaborate an extremely innovative and provocative vision of the world. It is not much of a stretch to define Leopardi as the father of what would eventually come to be called nihilism.

Schopenhauer, in mentioning the great minds of all ages who opposed optimism and expressed their knowledge of the world's misery, wrote:

But no one has treated this subject so thoroughly and exhaustively as Leopardi in our own day. He is entirely imbued and penetrated with it; everywhere his theme is the mockery and wretchedness of this existence. He presents it on every page of his works, yet in such a multiplicity of forms and applications, with such a wealth of imagery, that he never wearies us, but, on the contrary, has a diverting and stimulating effect.

— The World as Will and Representation, Vol. II, Ch. XLVI

John Gray, reviewing the first complete English translation of the Zibaldone in 2013, wrote that "Leopardi's subtle sensibility eludes conventional intellectual categories and the true achievement of this subversive genius has been little recognised [...] The first full English version of the Zibaldone is a major event in the history of ideas", stating that, thanks to the translation, "Leopardi will be ranked among the supreme interrogators of the modern condition".

== In popular culture ==
- Samuel Beckett refers to Leopardi's work several times in his critical study Proust and quotes a passage from "A Se Stesso", "non che la speme il desiderio", in the English version of his 1951 novel Molloy.
- In "The Part about the Crimes", the fourth part of Roberto Bolaño's novel 2666, Leopardi's Canto notturno di un pastore errante dell'Asia is extensively quoted by a television psychic named Florita Almada who somewhat confuses it for an account of the early life of Benito Juárez.
- The title of Carlo Forlivesi's album, Silenziosa Luna, is a quotation from the same poem.
- The 2014 Italian film Leopardi is a biography of his life.

== Selected English translations ==
- Leopardi, Giacomo (1923). The Poems of Leopardi. Translated by G.L. Bickersteth. New York: New American Library.
- Leopardi, Giacomo (1966). Iris Origo; John Heath-Stubbs (eds.). Giacomo Leopardi – Selected Prose and Poetry. New York: New American Library.
- Leopardi, Giacomo (1976). The War of the Mice and the Crabs. Translated by Ernesto G. Caserta. Chapel Hill: University of North Carolina Press. ISBN 978-0-8078-9164-3.
- Leopardi, Giacomo (1983). Operette Morali: Essays and Dialogues. Translated by Giovanni Cecchetti. Berkeley: University of California Press. ISBN 978-0-520-04928-4.
- Leopardi, Giacomo (1966). Flores, Angel (ed.). Poems and prose. Bloomington: Indiana University Press. ISBN 0-253-20094-6.
- Leopardi, Giacomo (1994). The Canti: With a Selection of His Prose. Translated by J.G. Nichols. Manchester: Carcanet Press. ISBN 978-1-85754-050-5.
- Leopardi, Giacomo (1997). Leopardi: Selected Poems. Translated by Eamon Grennan. Princeton: Princeton University Press. ISBN 978-0-691-01644-3.
- Leopardi, Giacomo (1998). Prue Shaw (ed.). The Letters of Giacomo Leopardi, 1817–1837. Abingdon: Routledge. ISBN 978-0-901286-97-0.
- Leopardi, Giacomo (2002). Thoughts. Translated by J.G. Nichols. London: Hesperus Classics. ISBN 978-1-84391-012-1.
- Leopardi, Giacomo (2010). Dialogue between Fashion and Death. Translated by Giovanni Cecchetti. London: Penguin Classics. ISBN 978-0-14-119255-0.
- Leopardi, Giacomo (2010). Canti. Translated by Jonathan Galassi (Bilingual ed.). New York: Farrar, Straus & Giroux. ISBN 978-0-374-23503-1.
- Leopardi, Giacomo (2013). Michael Caesar; Franco D'Intino (eds.). Zibaldone: The Notebooks of Leopardi. Translated by Kathleen Baldwin, Richard Dixon, David Gibbons, Ann Goldstein, Gerard Slowey, Martin Thom and Pamela Williams; New York: Farrar, Straus & Giroux. ISBN 978-0-374-29682-7.
- Leopardi, Giacomo (2014). Passions. Translated by Tim Parks. New Haven: Yale University Press. ISBN 978-0-300-18633-8. In his review of Zibaldone, Tim Parks writes that Passions is "a translation of a selection from the Zibaldone.
- Luzzi, Joseph (2016). "The Task of Italian Romanticism". In Paul Hamilton (ed.). The Oxford Handbook of European Romanticism. Oxford University Press. ISBN 978-0-19-106497-5.
- Leopardi, Giacomo (2017). Moral Fables, followed by Thoughts. Translated by J. G. Nichols. Richmond: Alma Books. ISBN 978-1-84749-580-8.
- Leopardi, Giacomo (2019). "New English Translation of La ginestra. Translated by Barbara Carle (bilingual version)". Journal of Italian Translation. 14 (1): 84–101.
