= Boccaccio's notebooks =

Autograph manuscripts by Giovanni Boccaccio

Giovanni Boccaccio's notebooks or zibaldoni have been preserved in three codices, known as the Zibaldone Laurenziano, the Miscellanea Laurenziana and the Zibaldone Magliabechiano. These are autograph manuscripts containing both texts copied by Boccaccio and original compositions, plus many notes. All three date from his early years in Naples and Florence.

The Zibaldone Laurenziano and the Miscellanea Laurenziana were not originally bound as such in Boccaccio's lifetime. They may not have been bound at all. They form a palimpsest, written on 18 quartos and 1 terno of parchment recycled from a Beneventan gradual of the late 13th century. The texts were rearranged into two blocks by Antonio Petrei in the 16th century and passed to the Laurentian Library in 1568, after which the two blocks were separated into the two codices. The Zibaldone Laurenziano is a hodgepodge of texts, more miscellaneous than the Miscellanea. They are mostly moral, literary and medieval. The Miscellanea contains mainly classical texts. The Zibaldone was compiled between about 1327 and the late 1340s. The Miscellanea is mostly a product of the 1340s, possibly into the 1350s.

The Zibaldone Magliabechiano is written in cursive on paper. Its authenticity was once debated, but it is now universally accepted as Boccaccio's. It has been dated to 1342–1345 and to 1351–1356. It is named for the librarian Antonio Magliabechi and is now kept in Florence, Biblioteca Nazionale Centrale, Banco Rari MS 50.

== Bibliography ==
- Cazalé Bérard, Claude (2013). "Boccaccio's Working Notebooks (Zibaldone Laurenziano, Miscellanea Laurenziana, Zibaldone Magliabechiano)". In Victoria Kirkham; Michael Sherberg; Janet Levarie Smarr (eds.). Boccaccio: A Critical Guide to the Complete Works. University of Chicago Press. pp. 307–318.
- Hankey, Teresa (1958). "Riccobaldo of Ferrara, Boccaccio and Domenico di Bandino". Journal of the Warburg and Courtauld Institutes. 21 (3): 208–226. doi:10.2307/750824. JSTOR 750824. S2CID 195047493.
- Morosini, Roberta (2013). "Giovanni Boccaccio". In David Thomas; Alex Mallett (eds.). Christian–Muslim Relations: A Bibliographical History. Vol. 5 (1350–1500). Brill. pp. 76–87. doi:10.1163/1877-8054_cmri_COM_24574.
