= Mount Tabor Good Samaritan Lodge No. 59 =

- Mt. Tabor Good Samaritan Lodge #59
- U.S. National Register of Historic Places
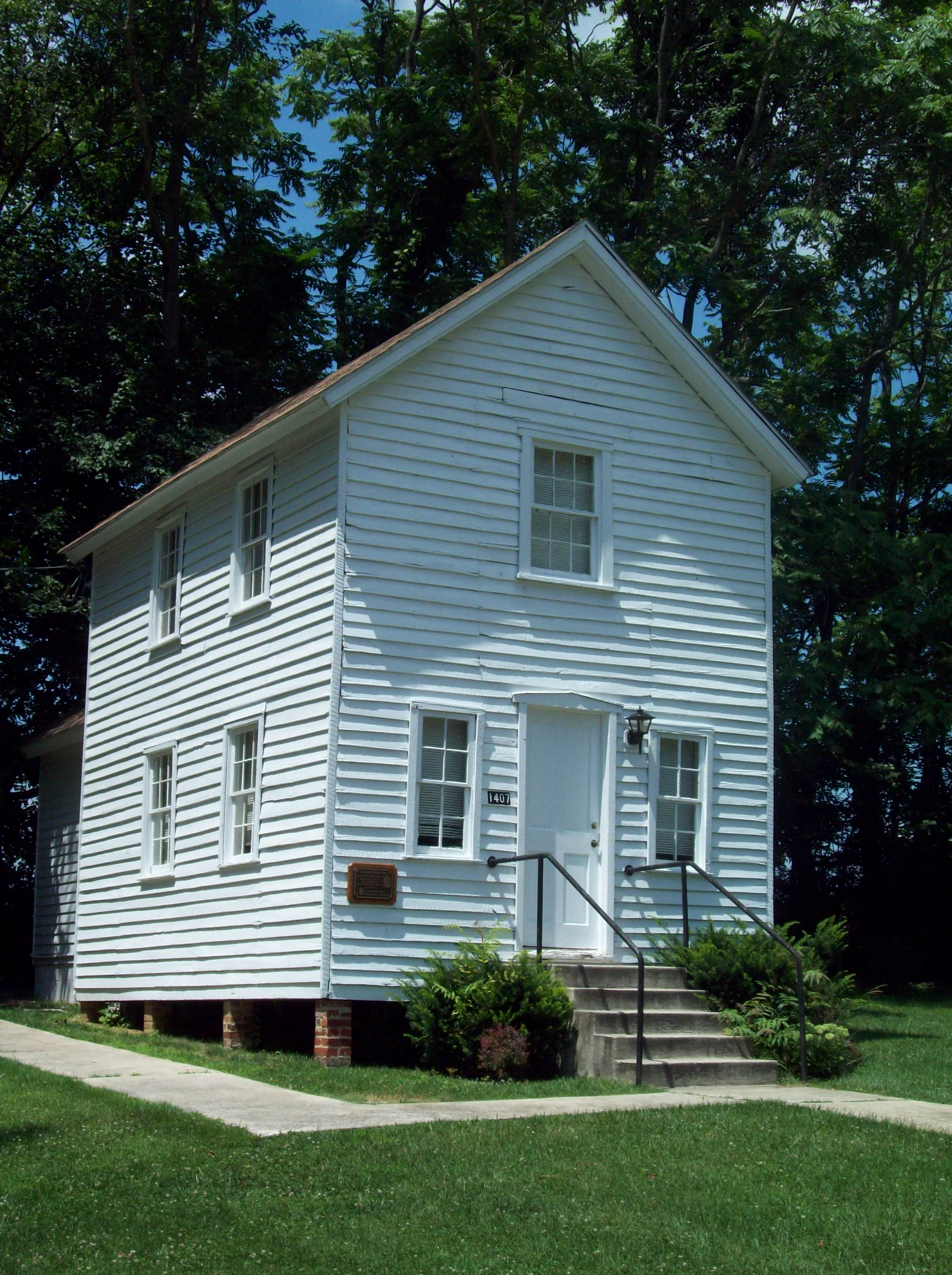
- Mt. Tabor Good Samaritan Lodge, July 2009

- Location within Maryland Location within the United States
- Nearest city: Crownsville, Maryland
- Coordinates: 39°0′34″N 76°37′49″W
- Built: 1899
- Architect: Hawkins, Lawrence, Sr.
- NRHP reference No.: 01000724
- Added to NRHP: July 20, 2001

Mt. Tabor Good Samaritan Lodge #59 is a historic building at Crownsville, Anne Arundel County, Maryland. It was constructed in 1899, and is a small, two-story wood-frame building, with a gable roof. A small one-story gable roof addition was made in 2000. Founded as the United Sons and Daughters of Levi Beneficial Society, No. 1 of Mount Tabor, it later joined the Independent Order of Good Samaritans and Daughters of Samaria, an African-American beneficial and temperance society for both men and women, as Mount Tabor Lodge No. 59. It is associated with the African American beneficial or benevolent society movement, and is one of six surviving African American benevolent society buildings in the state. The structure is located behind the Mt. Tabor Methodist Episcopal Church.

It was listed on the National Register of Historic Places in 2001.
