= Battle of Mount Tabor =

Battle of Mount Tabor may refer to:

== Battles ==
- Battle of Mount Tabor (biblical), in the time of the Book of Judges
- Battle of Mount Tabor (55 BC), a victory by the Romans against Jews
- Battle of Mount Tabor (67), a victory by the Romans against Jews during Vespasian's campaign
- Battle of Mount Tabor (1799), during Napoleon's campaign

== Painting ==
- The Battle of Mount Tabor, an 1808 painting by Louis-François Lejeune depicting the 1799 battle
