= Zibaldone =

Commonplace book

A zibaldone (plural zibaldoni) is an Italian vernacular commonplace book or notebook containing a wide variety of vernacular texts, copied into a small or medium-format paper codex by citizens in late-medieval and Renaissance Italian city-states.

== Origins and definition of "zibaldone" ==
First appearing during the mid-fourteenth century, the word zibaldone originally meant "a heap of things" or "miscellany" and was used in a poetic work by Franco Sacchetti, in the latter half of the fourteenth century. By the second half of the Quattrocento, the word zibaldone was specifically used to describe “a notebook that could contain a blend of literature, elemental science, (such as astrology, cosmography etc), prayers, and above all, personal memoirs.”

Like memoirs, zibaldoni are also family books, inasmuch as they were also created within a domestic environment and intended for limited private circulation. They diverge, however, from the more well-known Italian memoirs from this period, which are known as ricordanze, ricordi, or libri segreti, in significant way. Unlike the author of a memoir or diary, the compiler of a zibaldone was not primarily focused on recording biographical or historical documentation, but on collecting the most meaningful texts for their own edification and that of members of their family: “Though not private memoirs, and not quite public histories, zibaldoni were considered important containers of culture. Florentines took the transmission of their written culture as seriously as they did the transmission of the family name from one generation to the next.”

== Renaissance Florentine zibaldoni ==
By far, the majority of zibaldoni were copied by Florentines, although other Italians were also compiling them, notably Venetian merchants, beginning in the fourteenth century. Venetian examples include the Zibaldone da Canal and The Book of Michael of Rhodes. Due to the extremely high literacy rate in Florence of “at least 69.3% of the adult male population” in the fifteenth century, copying manuscripts was a very popular pastime there. Literary critic Vittore Branca has characterized these Florentines, who were not professional copyists, as “copisti per passione,” driven by a passion to compile and share the texts they considered valuable. Branca estimates that of the vast number of manuscripts they produced, more than 2,000 are still extant.

Though the majority of zibaldoni are anonymous, several compiled by well-known Florentine individuals have been the subject of scholarly studies, for instance Giovanni Boccaccio's three zibaldoni. and Giovanni di Paolo Rucellai’s Zibaldone quaresimale Similarly, the Rustici Codex, a zibaldone notable for the detailed illustrations by its copyist, the goldsmith Marco di Bartolomeo has been the subject of academic scrutiny. Among Leonardo da Vinci’s notebooks there are also writings that resemble zibaldoni.

Compiling these manuscripts was not limited to social elites like Rucellai, literary figures such as Boccaccio, or artists like Leonardo. As historian Dale Kent has shown, zibaldoni were copied by Florentines “in every rung of the social ladder of literate citizens, from Cosimo and Piero de’ Medici to soapmakers and saddlewrights.” And the texts they copied were as diverse as the copyists themselves: “Drawing on an extensive repertoire of devotional, antique, and civic literature, these informal personal books preserved the poetry, prose, songs, and snippets of valued information that comprised popular culture.”

== Texts that appear in zibaldoni ==
The following partial list is representative of the variety of vernacular texts copied in zibaldoni:

Pseudo-St. Bernard Epistle to Raymond; The Rule of the Ancients - Theophrastus On marriage; Instructions on Taking a Wife and The Twelve Instructions for a Bride; The Rosebush of Life; Schiavo di Bari Doctrine; Antonio Pucci The Annoyances; Aesop Three Fables; Seneca and Pseudo-Quintilian Declamations; Albertano da Brescia The Doctrine of Speaking and Remaining Silent; Two Treatises on Rhetoric; Stefano Porcari Speech to the Signoria of Florence; Giovanni Boccaccio Epistle to Pino de’ Rossi; Brigida Baldinotti Epistle to the Sisters of Santa Maria Nuova; Ovid Heroides; A Love Letter; The Virtues of Rosemary; Pope Innocent III’s Eye Remedy; On the Care of Women’s Bodies; “Sator arepo” and Book of Dreams; The Flowers of Virtue; Pseudo-Aristotle The Secret of Secrets; Aldobrandino of Siena On the Health of the Body; Leonardo Bruni Antiochus and Stratonica; Cantare of Pyramus and Thisbe; Andreas Cappellanus The Rules of Love; The Dialogues of Gregory the Great Three Tales; Domenico Cavalca Lives of the Holy Fathers “Saint Eustachius”; Flowers of the Philosophers “Secundus the Silent Philosopher”; The Story of the Woman Who Was Too Devoted to the Virgin Mary; The Legend of Saint Albano; Simone Forrestani da Siena (Saviozzo) The Girl Betrayed by Her Lover.

== Later uses of the term zibaldone ==
The word may also refer specifically to the book of philosophical reflections by the nineteenth-century Italian poet Giacomo Leopardi, the Zibaldone di pensieri often called simply The Zibaldone.

Furthermore, there is a twice-yearly German-language journal entitled Zibaldone. Zeitschrift für italienische Kultur der Gegenwart (Journal for Italian Culture of the Present Day).
