= Mount Tabor, Lexington =

Mount Tabor
- Neighborhood of Lexington, Kentucky
- Interactive map of Mount Tabor
- Coordinates: 38.000°N 84.457°W
- Country: United States
- State: Kentucky
- County: Fayette
- City: Lexington

Area
  - Total: .84 sq mi (2.2 km^{2})
  - Water: 0 sq mi (0.0 km^{2})

Population (2000)
  - Total: 4,509
  - Density: 5,367/sq mi (2,072/km^{2})
- Time zone: UTC-5 (Eastern (EST))
  - Summer (DST): UTC-4 (EDT)
- ZIP code: 40502
- Area code: 859

Mount Tabor is a neighborhood in southeastern Lexington, Kentucky, United States. Its boundaries are Alumni Drive to the west, New Circle Road to the north, Richmond Road to the east, and Man o' War Boulevard to the South.

== Neighborhood statistics ==
- Population: 4,509
- Land area: 0.84 square miles (2.2 km^{2})
- Population density: 5,367 per sq mile
- Median household income: $40,333
