= Tabor Academy =

Tabor Academy may refer to:

- Tabor Academy, Braintree, a secondary school in Braintree, Essex, England
- Tabor Academy (Massachusetts), a college preparatory school in Marion, Massachusetts, United States

== See also ==
- Tabor (disambiguation)
