= Giuseppe Acerbi =

Italian naturalist, explorer and composer (1773–1846)

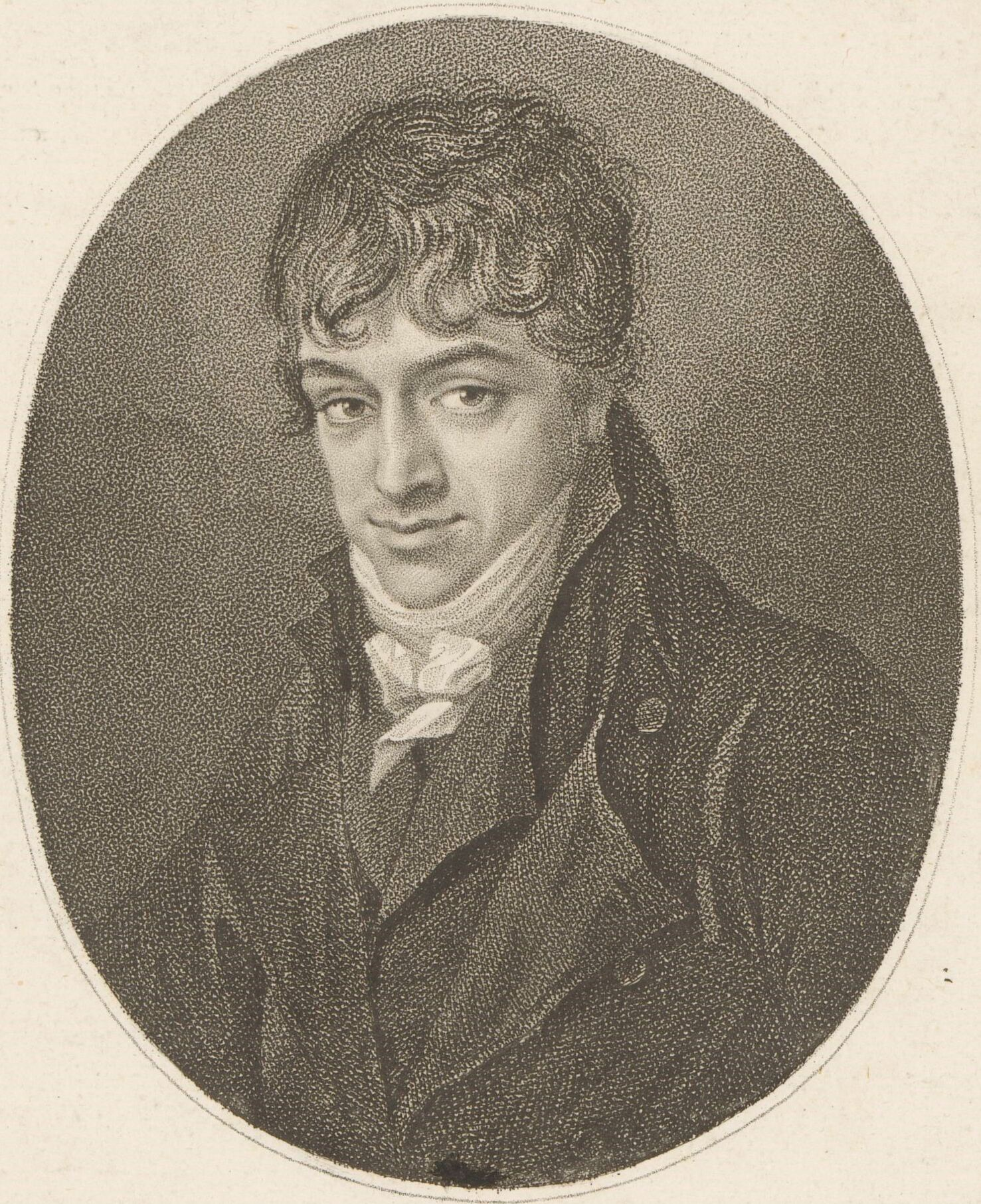
- Portrait of Giuseppe Acerbi. Copperplate engraving by Carl Hermann Pfeiffer
- Born: 3 May 1773; Castel Goffredo, Duchy of Milan
- Died: 25 August 1846 (aged 73); Castel Goffredo, Kingdom of Lombardy–Venetia
- Occupations: Naturalist; Explorer; Composer
- Writing career
- Language: Italian
- Notable works: Travels through Sweden, Finland and Lapland to the North Cape in the years 1798 and 1799 (1802)

Giuseppe Acerbi (3 May 1773 – 25 August 1846) was an Italian naturalist, explorer and composer.

== Biography ==
Giuseppe Acerbi was born on 3 May 1773, in Castel Goffredo, in Lombardy. In 1798, Acerbi traveled to Lapland, publishing his experiences in Travels through Sweden, Finland and Lapland to the North Cape in the years 1798 and 1799 (2 vols., London, 1802). Some of his works can be found in the New York Society Library in New York City. He also written other works along with compositions that became popular.

During his travels, he collected some Finnish folk melodies and religious songs, one of which he used in a Clarinet Concerto. This was the first Finnish melody to be used in serious music.

In 1836, Acerbi retired from his travels and career. He returned to his hometown Castel Goffredo. He began to organize and administer his notes and collections from his travels. He never completed the task; Giuseppe Acerbi died in his hometown of Castel Goffredo, Italy on 25 August 1846. He was seventy-three years old.

== Education ==
Giuseppe Acerbi was educated by both his parents at a young age. As he got older, he eventually was taught by a tutor that demanded Acerbi to learn Italian, French, German and English as an addition of knowing his native Lombard language. He also learned Latin to add to his list of languages. He was taught about classic music, art, and become heavily involved with the sciences. At the age of twenty one, he graduated and received a degree of law from University at Pavia.

== Travels ==
Since the start of his travels, the Finnish coast was not what Acerbi expected. From the beginning, Acerbi hated it. He was shocked by the culture of the people and did not enjoy it. After fighting with other explorers that were part of his trip, Acerbi decided travel through Finnish Lapland by himself on his return of going home. On his way, he recorded hundreds of pages of observations on the Sami people. He wrote notes on the Sami music, language, clothing and the customs. Eventually, he would grow to appreciate the Sami people and culture.

During his stay in Finland he picked up several books of poems, Jos mun tuttuni tulisi ( "If you were my dear"), the lullaby Nuku, nuku nurmilintu ( "Sleep, sleep little bird"), the poem of Antti Keksi about the flood of the Torne river in 1677, eventually becoming a religious song. He recorded the melody of the song "Do Not Be afraid of the People of Finland" and of Kalevala, the Finnish epic poem, composed of 50 songs, or runi, describing the execution of these poems by local shaman singers.

== Legacy ==
The figure of Acerbi is much more famous in Finland than in Italy: the Finnish radio station's title is derived from his melody. Acerbi returned to Italy after the publication of his book.

In Italy, Acerbi is a controversial figure, as he collaborated with the Austrian Empire, which at the time ruled over most of northern Italy. Following Napoleon’s defeat, the Austrian government appointed Acerbi as the editor of the new cultural journal Biblioteca Italiana. The Habsburg authorities explicitly designed and funded this publication to win over Italian intellectuals and neutralize nationalist sentiments. Published from 1816 to 1859, Biblioteca Italiana soon came to be viewed as an instrument of Austrian oppression, even though its contributors included some of the era's most prestigious writers, such as Vincenzo Monti, Pietro Giordani and Gian Domenico Romagnosi. Acerbi further cemented his ties with the occupying power by serving as the Consul-General for the Austrian Empire in Egypt from 1826 to 1834.

The Premio letterario Giuseppe Acerbi, an Italian literary award, is named for Acerbi.

== Sources ==
- Visconti, Dante (1960). "ACERBI, Giuseppe". Dizionario Biografico degli Italiani (in Italian). Vol. 1: Aaron–Albertucci. Rome: Istituto dell'Enciclopedia Italiana. OCLC 883370.
