= Mount Tabor Methodist Episcopal Church (Crownsville, Maryland) =

Historic church in Maryland, United States

- Mt. Tabor Methodist Episcopal Church
- U.S. National Register of Historic Places
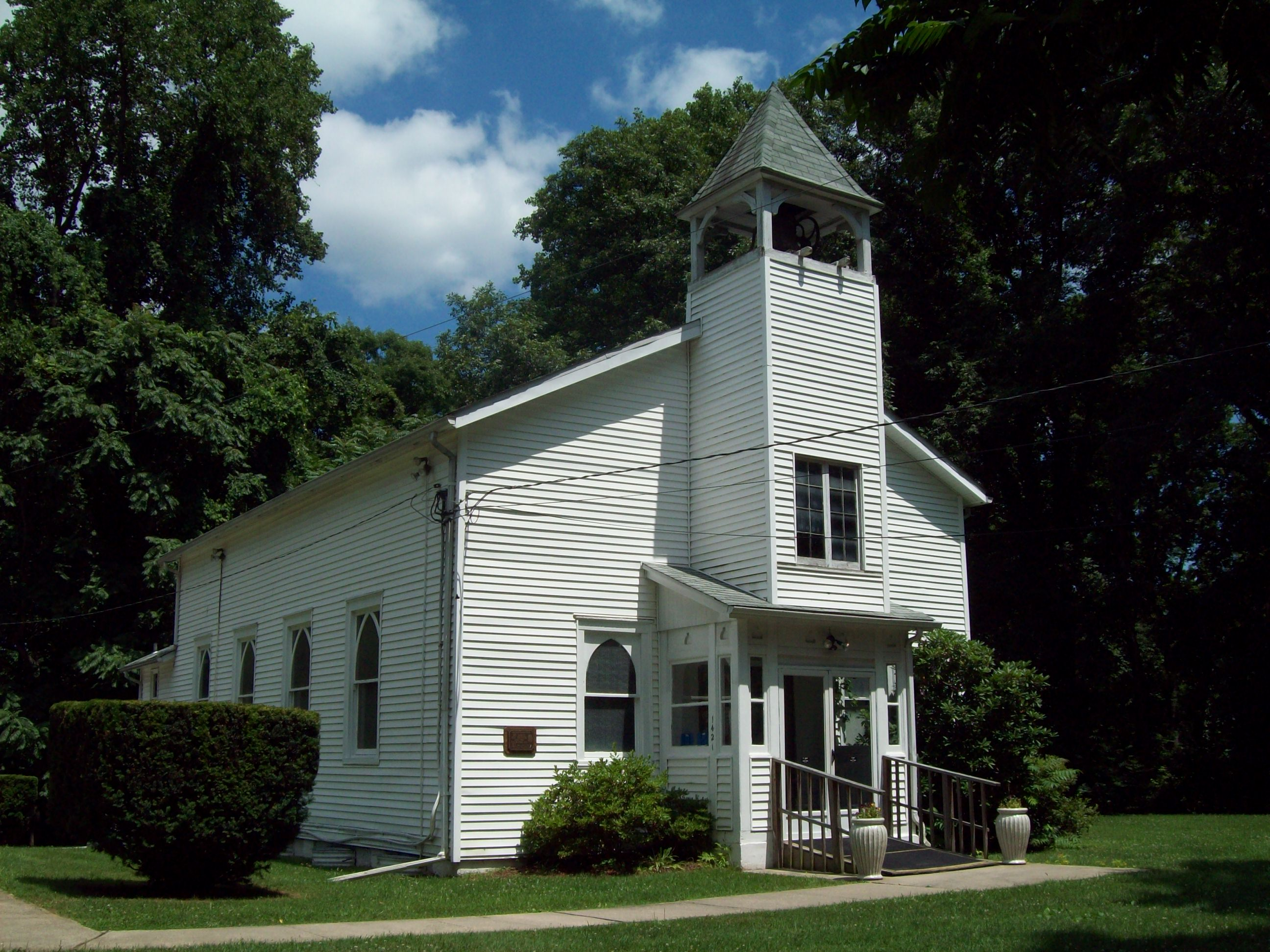
- Mt. Tabor Methodist Episcopal Church, July 2009

- Location within Maryland Location within the United States
- Nearest city: Crownsville, Maryland
- Coordinates: 39°0′25″N 76°37′50″W
- Built: 1893
- Architect: Queen, James; Parker, George
- Architectural style: Colonial Revival
- NRHP reference No.: 01000373
- Added to NRHP: April 12, 2001

Mt. Tabor Methodist Episcopal Church, also known as Mt. Tabor United Methodist Church, is an historic church located at 1421 St. Stephens Church Road, in Crownsville, Anne Arundel County, Maryland. The wood-frame building was constructed in 1893. It is rectangular in plan and features a bell tower projecting from the gable front. The bell tower was added between 1923 and 1929 by Henry and John Queen. Also on the property is the Mt. Tabor Good Samaritan Lodge No. 59.

It was listed on the National Register of Historic Places in 2001.
