= Catherine Gayer =

American singer opera soprano (born 1937)

- Born: 11 February 1937 (age 88); Los Angeles, US
- Education: Hochschule der Künste, Berlin
- Occupations: Operatic coloratura soprano; Violinist; Musicologist; Academic voice teacher
- Organizations: Deutsche Oper Berlin; Folkwang Hochschule

Catherine Gayer (born 11 February 1937) is an American coloratura soprano, violinist, musicologist, and academic voice teacher. She made a career in Germany. A member of the Deutsche Oper Berlin for more than four decades, she is known for her performance in premieres of contemporary operas, such as Luigi Nono's Intolleranza 1960 at La Fenice in Venice, the title role in Aribert Reimann's Melusine at the Schwetzingen Festival, and Josef Tal's Die Versuchung at the Bavarian State Opera.

== Career ==
Born in Los Angeles, Gayer is of Finno-Ugric and native American ancestry. She studied voice, violin, and musicology in Los Angeles and moved to Germany on a Fulbright scholarship in the 1950s, studying at the Hochschule der Künste in Berlin with Irma Beilke. She is also a trained ballet dancer.

On 13 April 1961, she performed the female lead role (Die Gefährtin) in the premiere of Luigi Nono's Intolleranza 1960 at La Fenice in Venice, and was afterwards engaged by Rudolf Sellner as a member of the ensemble of the Deutsche Oper Berlin. She appeared in Europe in classical repertory, and especially in contemporary opera, in roles such as Hilde Mack in Henze's Elegie für junge Liebende and Marie in Bernd Alois Zimmermann's Die Soldaten, staged by Hans Neuenfels. Several composers wrote roles for her voice, including Aribert Reimann, who wrote Melusine for her. She took part in several premieres of new operas. On 24 April 1963, she performed in the first scenic production of Darius Milhaud's trilogy L'Orestie d'Eschyle, which was also the premiere of its third part, at the Deutsche Oper Berlin. On 25 September 1965, she appeared in the premiere of Isang Yun's Der Traum des Liu-Tung at the Akademie der Künste in Berlin, conducted by Ulrich Weder, with Barry McDaniel in the title role. On 29 September 1968, she performed in Luigi Dallapiccola's Ulisse at the Deutsche Oper Berlin, conducted by Lorin Maazel. On 19 April 1971, she sang the title role in Reimann's Melusine at the Schwetzingen Festival, conducted by Reinhard Peters. On 26 July 1976, she appeared in Josef Tal's Die Versuchung (The Temptation) at the Bavarian State Opera, conducted by Gary Bertini. She also sang roles in the classical repertory, including Monteverdi's L'incoronazione di Poppea. She appeared as Berg's Lulu at several opera houses.

Gayer has also been interested in popular music (Unterhaltungsmusik) and jazz. As a teacher at the Folkwang-Hochschule, she has taught musical theatre, along with traditional subjects. She was married to Abraham Ashkenasi; they have two sons, the physicist David Ashkenasi and the composer and actor Danny Ashkenasi. She retired from the opera with a recital at the Deutsche Oper Berlin, after 41 years at the house.

== Audio play ==
- Robert Gillner (ed.): Shakespeare for Lovers. speaker: Catherine Gayer, Monarda Publishing House, Halle 2012, 2 CDs, 92 minutes
