= Anna Nekhames =

Russian soprano (born 1995)

- Анна Нехамес
- Born: 1995 (age 30–31); Russia
- Education: Gnessin State Musical College; University of Music and Performing Arts Vienna
- Occupation: Operatic soprano
- Organizations: Oper Frankfurt

Anna Igorevna Nekhames (Russian: Анна Игоревна Нехамес, born 1995) is a Russian operatic soprano who has made an international career. She has been based since 2022 at the Oper Frankfurt, where she performed the coloratura soprano roles of the Queen of the Night in Mozart's Die Zauberflöte and the exceptionally difficult dual role of Venus and Chief of the Gepopo in Ligeti's Le Grand Macabre.

== Early life and education ==
Nekhames was born in Russia in 1995. As a child she performed in the Bolshoi Theatre's children's chorus in Moscow from 2004. She studied voice first in Moscow, beginning in 2010 at the Galina Vishnevskaya College and then for four years at the Gnessin State Musical College. In 2018, she began further studies at the University of Music and Performing Arts Vienna. She achieved prizes at competitions in Russia and Italy; in 2019 she won the first prize of the 11th International Hilde Zadek Competition in Vienna. In 2021, she won the 3rd International Haydn Competition.

== Career ==
Nekhames joined the studio of the Vienna State Opera in 2020, performing roles such as Musetta in Puccini's La Bohème, Madame Herz in Mozart's Der Schauspieldirektor, and Olympia in Offenbach's Les contes d'Hoffmann.

She performed at the Vienna State Opera the world premiere of three songs from a song cycle by Andri Joel Harison, Die Weisen einer Liebenden on 5 March 2022, accompanied by the composer at the Mahler-Saal.

Since the 2022/23 season, Nekhames has been a member of the ensemble of the Oper Frankfurt. Her first role at the house was the Queen of the Night in Mozart's Die Zauberflöte. In November 2023, she appeared in the "fiercely demanding" dual role of Venus and Gepopo in Ligeti's Le Grand Macabre, conducted by Thomas Guggeis. A reviewer described her "coloratura acrobatics" as almost unbelievable, while another wrote: "Anna Nekhames in a double role almost seems to go beyond the vocal limits." A critic from Musik Heute mentioned her among the "most exciting singers" of the performances, noting that she broke all limits. She appeared as Fauno in Mozart's early work Ascanio in Alba at the Bockenheimer Depot in December 2023.

When Oper Frankfurt staged Reimann's Melusine in 2025 after the composer's death, directed by Aileen Schneider, she portrayed the demanding title role.
