= Barry McDaniel =

American opera singer (1930–2018)

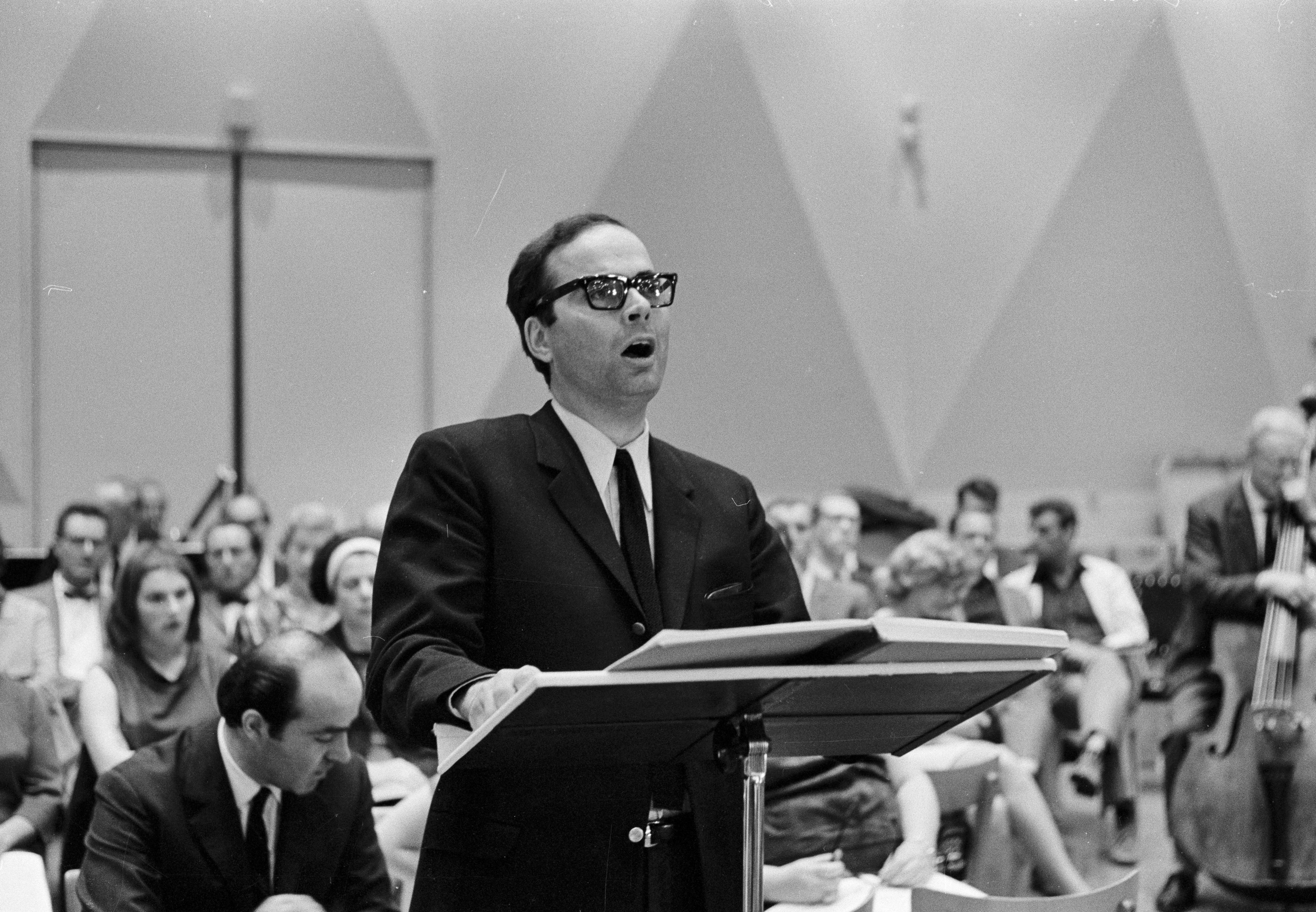
- McDaniel in 1966
- Born: October 18, 1930; Lyndon, Kansas, US
- Died: June 18, 2018 (aged 87); Berlin, Germany
- Education: Juilliard School of Music; Musikhochschule Stuttgart
- Occupation: Operatic baritone
- Organizations: Staatstheater Mainz; Staatsoper Stuttgart; Staatstheater Karlsruhe; Deutsche Oper Berlin

Barry McDaniel (October 18, 1930 – June 18, 2018) was an American operatic baritone who spent his career almost exclusively in Germany, including 37 years at the Deutsche Oper Berlin. He appeared internationally at major opera houses and festivals, and created roles in several new operas, including Henze's Der junge Lord, Nabokov's Love's Labour's Lost, and Reimann's Melusine. He was also a celebrated concert singer and recitalist, focused on German Lied and French mélodie. He was the first singer of Wilhelm Killmayer's song cycle Tre Canti di Leopardi. He recorded both operatic and concert repertory.

== Career ==
McDaniel was born in Lyndon, Kansas, to musical parents who soon became aware of his talent. From the age of nine he took systematic lessons in singing, piano and percussion and enjoyed considerable local popularity as a boy soprano soloist in churches and private concerts. When his voice changed from soprano to baritone, he studied voice first at the University of Kansas, and from 1950 at the Juilliard School of Music in New York as a student of the Mack Harrell. After graduating from Juilliard with honors, he was among the first young singers to go to Germany on a Fulbright scholarship in 1953. He studied with Alfred Paulus and Hermann Reutter at the Musikhochschule Stuttgart, where he worked on his already extensive repertoire of German and French art song. He made his first professional appearance as a recitalist in Stuttgart in 1953. Hermann Reutter – a renowned composer in his own right – was to become one of his favorite accompanists throughout his career. After a first contract with the Staatstheater Mainz in the 1954/55 season, he had to serve in the U.S. Army for two years. He was a member of the Staatsoper Stuttgart from 1957 to 1959, when he moved to the opera at the Staatstheater Karlsruhe.

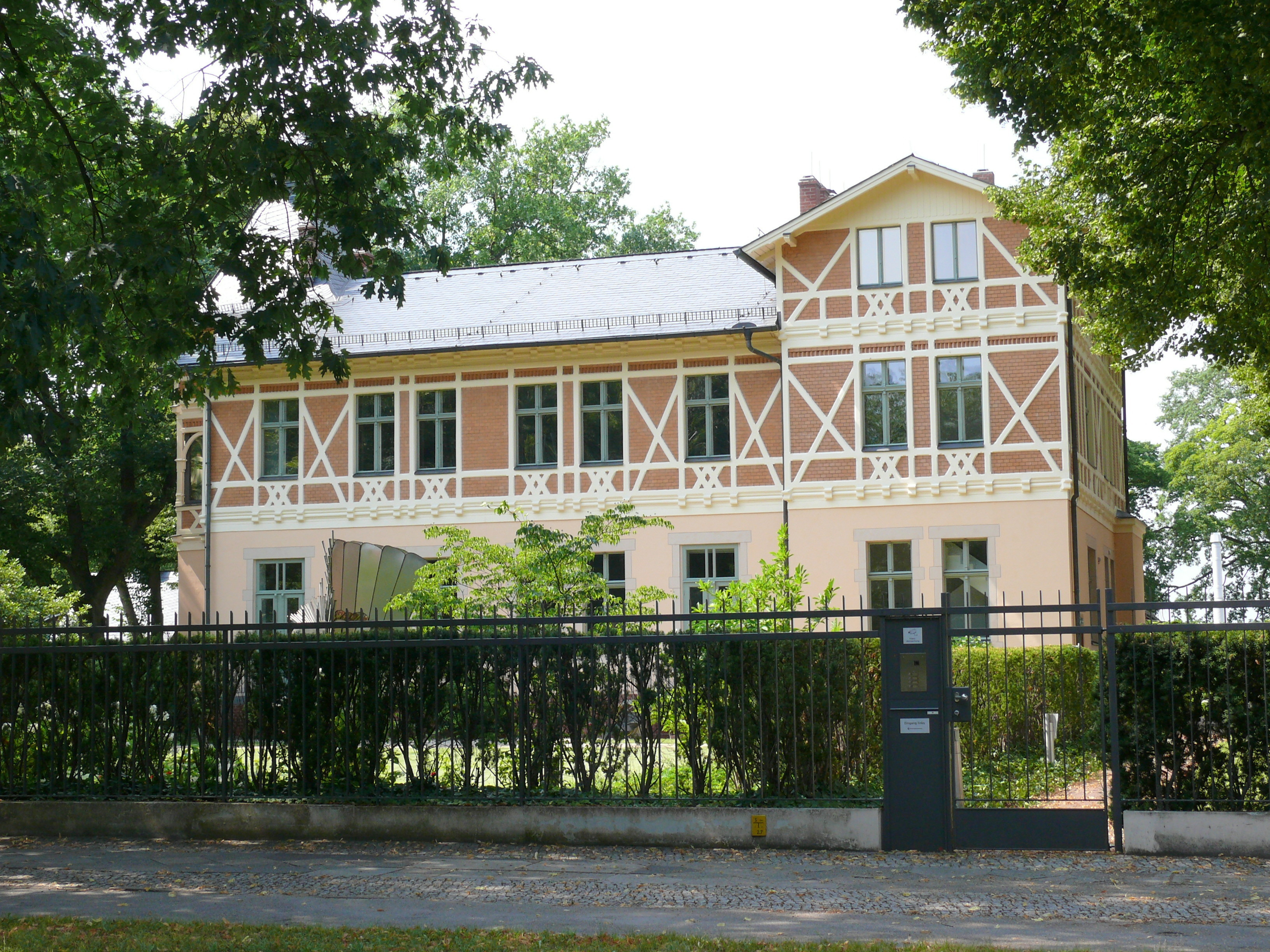
Kronprinzessinnenweg 21, on the Großer Wannsee in Berlin, the mansion where McDaniel lived from 1962 onwards. Originally built in 1896, it was the main residence of Third Reich architect Albert Speer between 1935 and 1941.

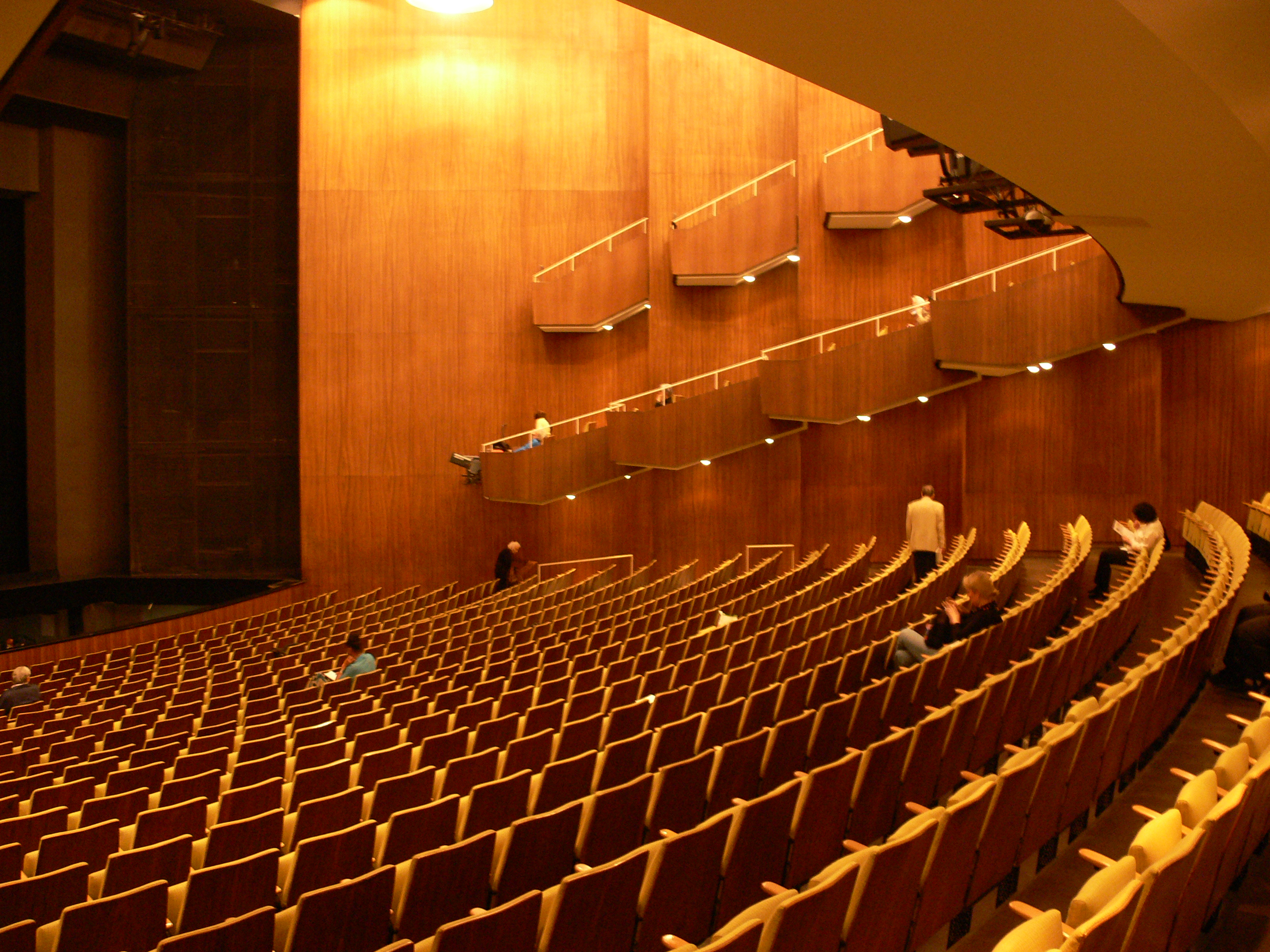
Interior of the Deutsche Oper Berlin

In autumn 1961, Egon Seefehlner, the deputy director and talent scout of the newly reopened Deutsche Oper Berlin, heard him in a performance in Karlsruhe and recruited him for his opera. McDaniel remained under contract with the Deutsche Oper from 1962 till 1999, singing more than 1,800 performances, in the premieres of 54 productions. He collaborated with some of Germany's most distinguished stage directors such as Rudolf Sellner, Götz Friedrich or Günther Rennert, in an ensemble that included singers such as Dietrich Fischer-Dieskau, Elisabeth Grümmer, Josef Greindl, Ernst Haefliger, James King, Pilar Lorengar and Edith Mathis. His stage repertoire of 98 roles encompassed Gluck and Mozart, Italian bel canto and Richard Strauss as well as contemporary opera, in which he created several roles. He was the first to appear as Cuauhtemoc in Montezuma by Roger Sessions in 1964, and as the Secretary in Hans Werner Henze's Der junge Lord in 1965. He created the title role in Isang Yun's Der Traum des Liu-Tung at the Akademie der Künste in Berlin in 1965. In 1966, he took part in the premiere of Amerika by Roman Haubenstock. In 1973, he appeared as Merowne in the premiere of Nicolas Nabokov's Love's Labour's Lost, given by the Deutsche Oper Berlin at La Monnaie in Brussels. In 1976, he performed in the premiere of Der Tempelbrand by Toshiro Mayuzumi. In addition to his more than 2,100 stage and concert performances in Berlin, he gave frequent guest performances and recitals in opera houses of Hamburg and Frankfurt, and appeared regularly at the Munich Opera Festival for 11 years. He performed in Vienna, Geneva, Amsterdam, Mexico and Japan. In 1964 he appeared as Wolfram in Wagner's Tannhäuser at the Bayreuth Festival. He appeared as a male lead, Count Lusignan, in the premiere of Aribert Reimann's opera Melusine at the Schwetzingen Festival of 1971, in a production that was also shown at the Edinburgh International Festival that year, with Catherine Gayer in the title role. In 1972 he made his New York debut as Pelléas in Debussy's Pelléas et Mélisande at the Metropolitan Opera, with seven performances.

McDaniel displayed remarkable versatility as an oratorio singer and recitalist, with compositions from Baroque to contemporary. His focus in sacred music was on Bach cantatas, and being the vox Christi (voice of Christ) in both Bach's St Matthew Passion and the St John Passion, and works by Georg Philipp Telemann. With Lied, he focused on Franz Schubert's great song cycles, Robert Schumann, Johannes Brahms and Hugo Wolf. He was also a frequent performer of French mélodies, such as by Claude Debussy, Maurice Ravel and Francis Poulenc, and a specialist of contemporary scores by composers such as Aribert Reimann, Anton Webern, Günter Bialas, Luigi Dallapiccola and Carl Orff. In 1967, he performed the vocal part in the premiere of Wilhelm Killmayer's song cycle Tre Canti di Leopardi in Munich, conducted by Reinhard Peters.

In 1970 he was awarded the title of Kammersänger by the Senate of Berlin. In the late 1980s, McDaniel began to cut back on his opera and concert performances and finally retired in 1999, after a series of solo concerts dedicated to the popular songs of his native country. He lived in Berlin, where he died on June 18, 2018.

== Operatic roles ==
McDaniel's roles on the opera stage included:

Gluck
Orest in Iphigenie auf Tauris
Mozart
- Allazim in Zaide
- Nardo in La finta giardiniera
- Count Almaviva in Le nozze di Figaro
- Guglielmo in Così fan tutte
- Papageno in Die Zauberflöte
Donizetti
Malatesta in Don Pasquale
Domenico Cimarosa
Count Robinson in Il matrimonio segreto
Rossini
- Figaro in Il Barbiere di Siviglia
- Selim and Poet in Il turco in Italia
- Dandini in La Cenerentola
Albert Lortzing
- Count Eberbach in Der Wildschütz
- Tsar in Zar und Zimmermann
Leoncavallo
Silvio in Pagliacci
Wagner
- Wolfram in Tannhäuser
- Melot in Tristan und Isolde
Puccini
- Alcindor in La bohème
- Sharpless in Madama Butterfly
- Ping in Turandot
Richard Strauss
- Olivier in Capriccio
- Harlequin in Ariadne auf Naxos
- Barber in Die schweigsame Frau
Debussy
Pelléas in Pelléas et Mélisande
Poulenc
Husband in Les mamelles de Tirésias
Roger Sessions
Cuauhtemoc in Montezuma
Hans Werner Henze
Secretary in Der junge Lord
Isang Yun
Title role in Der Traum des Liu-Tung
Aribert Reimann
Count Lusignan in Melusine

== Voice and recordings ==
McDaniel's voice was a lyric baritone with a range of 2½ octaves (from a low F in the St John Passion to a high A in Pelléas et Mélisande), a remarkable vocal technique and breath control (he was able to sing the 9-bar melisma in the opening phrase of the Kreuzstabkantate, BWV 56 in one breath), and a striking beauty of tone. The New Grove Dictionary of Music and Musicians praises his "mellifluous voice" as well as "a fine sense of line and an acute understanding and projection of the text". Over the years the voice gained in nuances and depth of expression but never lost its youthful, lyrical character, and McDaniel always avoided straying beyond the limits of his Fach, e.g. to heavy Wagner or Italian Verismo parts. The weekly Die Zeit commented on his role in Melusine in 1971: "Such poetic vocal expression, such lucid operatic lyricism is unequalled today, and who could give it a more beguiling voice than Barry McDaniel."

McDaniel's recordings span his entire repertoire and all phases of his career. Some of them are commercially available: cantatas and oratorios by Johann Sebastian Bach, operas by Mozart, Strauss and Henze, and works of contemporary church music, many of which he was the first and only to commit to record. In 1964, he recorded Le Soleil des eaux by Pierre Boulez, alongside soprano Josephine Nendick and tenor Louis Devos. He recorded Schubert's Winterreise twice (1972 and 1985). He recorded in 1980, in a performance of the Salzburg Festival conducted by Leopold Hager, the role of Nardo in Mozart's La finta giardiniera. In 1989, he recorded the title role of Kurt Weill's Der Zar lässt sich photographieren with the Kölner Rundfunkorchester conducted by Jan Latham-Koenig. McDaniel sang many art songs for German public radio stations, the Swiss radio and the BBC. A 1972 live recording from the Metropolitan Opera which documents his Pelléas was reviewed by Hans Heinz Stuckenschmidt in 1963 as "a performance of perfection".
