= Love's Labour's Lost (opera) =

Opera by Nicholas Nabokov

- Opera by Nicolas Nabokov
- Librettist: W. H. Auden; Chester Kallman
- Language: English
- Based on: Love's Labour's Lost by Shakespeare
- Premiere: February 7, 1973; Brussels

Love's Labour's Lost is an opera by Nicolas Nabokov, written by W. H. Auden and Chester Kallman, based on Shakespeare's play of the same name. It was first performed in Brussels on 7 February 1973.

== History ==
While Nabokov was in New York, preparing a ballet revival, Lincoln Kirstein initiated talks with W. H. Auden who was looking for an opera project and had already contacted Michael Tippett and Harrison Birtwistle. The composer read Shakespeare's play Love's Labour's Lost again, and found similarities to Mozart's Così fan tutte in its "stylized, deliberately artificial plot". Auden and Nabokov discussed the project in February 1969. Auden won Chester Kallman to participate, as before for Stravinsky's The Rake's Progress and Henze's Elegy for Young Lovers. In his foreword to an edition of Shakespeare's play for the Royal Shakespeare Company, Jonathan Bate muses that they were possibly inspired by Thomas Mann's novel Doctor Faustus, in which the fictional hero composes his single opera based on this same play, intended to be "in a spirit of the most artificial mockery and parody of the artificial, something highly playful and highly precious".

The librettists agreed to focus on the scenes around the couples, and Nabokov planned a "tender, lyrical, gay, but fairly small-scale opera". In July that year, the three met in Austria, working on the project, and in September the libretto was completed. It contains also a speech from As You Like It and an anonymous song from the 17th century. The plot is stretched over four seasons. Nabokov wrote the first act while being composer in residence in Aspen, Colorado, in 1970. He resumed working on the score in February 1971 in Kolbsheim, completing the work there in September. For the orchestration, he was assisted by the German-American conductor Harold Byrns. The New Grove Dictionary of Opera summarizes that "the music is cast in an eclectic parody style the composer called 'persiflage', sending up Tristan and Beethoven's Fifth Symphony in Berowne's love aria, Weill and Eisler in the 'Discourse about Love', American crooning in Moth's songs, Glinka and Mussorgsky for the 'Muscovite' masquerade, and catches and madrigals."

The opera premiered in Brussels on 7 February 1973. A German version, Verlorene Liebesmüh, was written by Claus H. Henneberg, but performances in Berlin shortly after the premiere were in English, because the singers were reluctant to learn yet another language.

== Roles ==
Roles, voice types, premiere cast
Role	Voice type	Premiere cast, 7 February 1973 Conductor: Reinhard Peters
Rosaline	dramatic soprano	Lou Ann Wyckoff
Katherine	lyric soprano	
Jaquenetta	coloratura soprano	Carol Malone
Moth	lyric soprano (contralto)	David Knudsen
Princess	coloratura mezzo-soprano	Patricia Johnson
Dumaine	tenor	
Berowne	high baritone	Barry McDaniel
Don Armado	baritone	George Fortune
King	baritone	
Boyet	bass	Manfred Röhrl
