= Love's Labour's Lost =

Comedy play by William Shakespeare

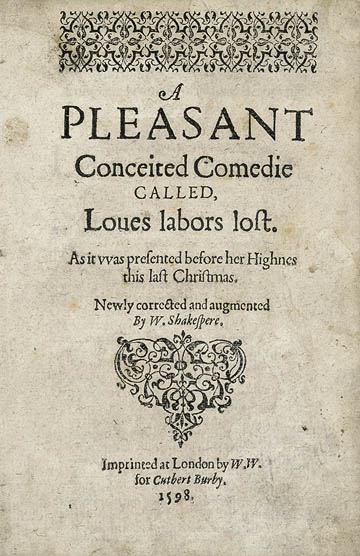
Title page of the first quarto (1598)

Love's Labour's Lost is one of William Shakespeare's early comedies, believed to have been written in the mid-1590s for a performance at the Inns of Court before Queen Elizabeth I. It follows the King of Navarre and his three companions as they attempt to swear off the company of women for three years in order to focus on study and fasting. Their subsequent infatuation with the Princess of France and her ladies makes them forsworn (to have broken their oath). In an untraditional ending for a comedy, the play closes with the death of the Princess's father, and all weddings are delayed for a year. The play draws on themes of masculine love and desire, reckoning and rationalisation, and reality versus fantasy.

Though first published in quarto in 1598, the play's title page suggests a revision of an earlier version of the play. There are no obvious sources for the play's plot. The use of apostrophes in the play's title varies in early editions, though it is most commonly given as Love's Labour's Lost.

Shakespeare's audiences were familiar with the historical personages portrayed and the political situation in Europe relating to the setting and action of the play. Scholars suggest the play lost popularity as these historical and political portrayals of Navarre's court became dated and less accessible to theatergoers of later generations. The play's sophisticated wordplay, pedantic humour and dated literary allusions may also be causes for its relative obscurity, as compared with Shakespeare's more popular works. Love's Labour's Lost was rarely staged in the 19th century, but it has been seen more often in the 20th and 21st centuries, with productions by the Royal Shakespeare Company, the National Theatre, and the Stratford Festival of Canada, among others. It has also been adapted as a musical, an opera, for radio and television and as a musical film.

== Characters ==
- Ferdinand – King of Navarre
- Lord Berowne (or Biron), Lord Longueville (or Longaville) and Lord Dumaine – attending on the King
- Princess of France, later Queen of France
- Lady Rosaline, Lady Maria, Lady Katharine and Boyet – attending on the Princess
- Marcadé – messenger
- Don Adriano de Armado – a fantastical Spaniard
- Moth – Armado's page
- Sir Nathaniel – curate
- Holofernes – schoolmaster
- Dull – constable
- Costard – a rustic
- Jaquenetta – country wench
- Forester
- Officers and others, attendants on the King and Princess

== Synopsis ==
Ferdinand, King of Navarre, and his three noble companions, the Lords Berowne, Dumaine, and Longaville, take an oath not to give in to the company of women. They devote themselves to three years of study and fasting; Berowne agrees somewhat more hesitantly than the others. The King declares that no woman should come within a mile of the court. Don Adriano de Armado, a Spaniard visiting the court, writes a letter to tell the King of a tryst between Costard and Jaquenetta. After the King sentences Costard, Don Armado confesses his own love for Jaquenetta to his page, Moth. Don Armado writes Jaquenetta a letter and asks Costard to deliver it.

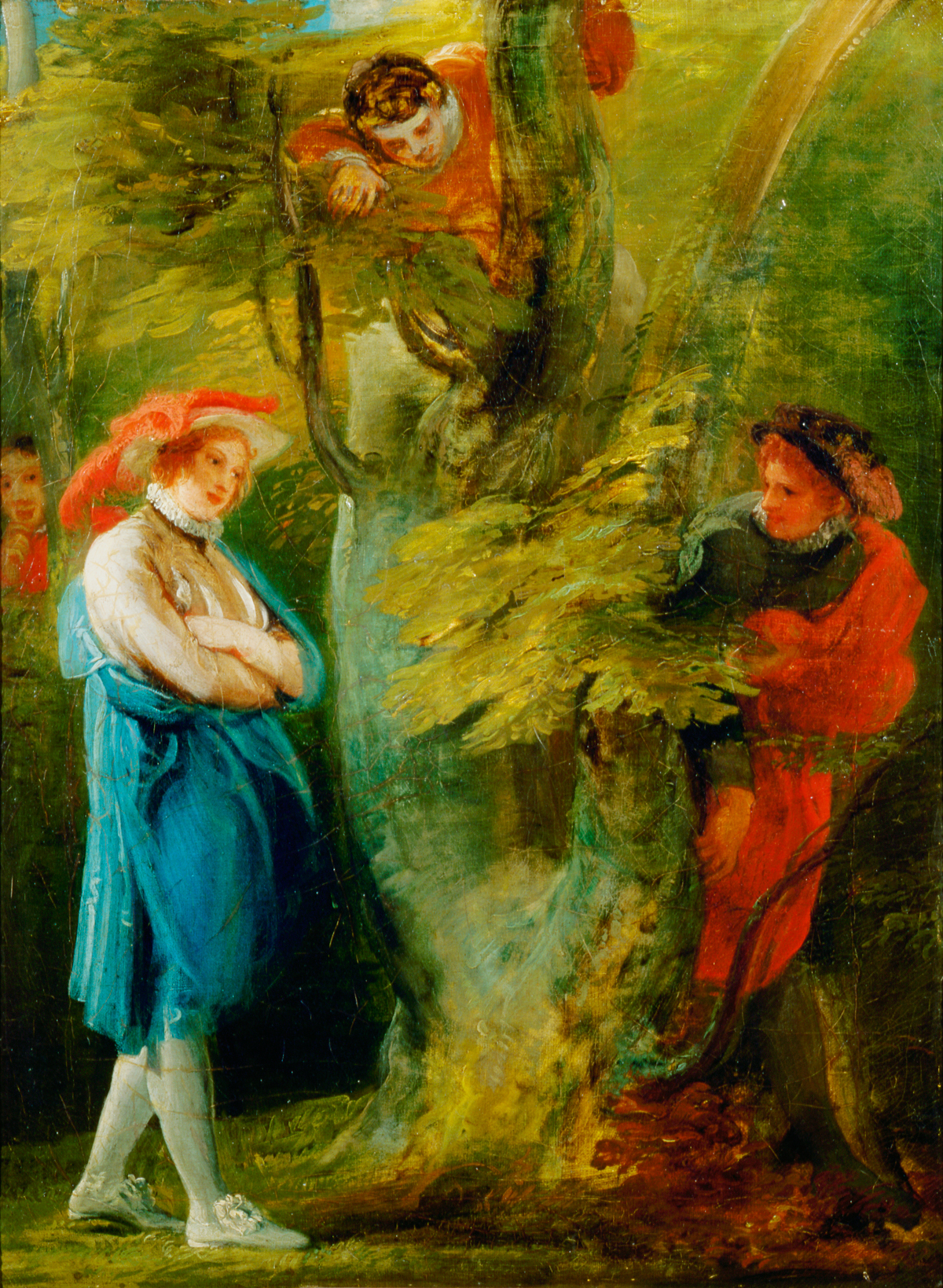
Love's Labour's Lost, Act IV, Scene 3, by Thomas Stothard (c. 1800)

The Princess of France and her ladies arrive, wishing to speak to the King regarding the cession of Aquitaine, but must ultimately make their camp outside the court due to the decree. In visiting the Princess and her ladies at their camp, the King falls in love with the Princess, as do the lords with the ladies. Berowne gives Costard a letter to deliver to the lady Rosaline, which Costard switches with Don Armado's letter that was meant for Jaquenetta. Jaquenetta consults two scholars, Holofernes and Sir Nathaniel, who conclude that the letter is written by Berowne and instruct her to tell the King.

The King and his lords lie in hiding and watch one another as each subsequently reveals his feelings of love. The King ultimately chastises the lords for breaking the oath, but Berowne reveals that the King is likewise in love with the Princess. Jaquenetta and Costard enter with Berowne's letter and accuse him of treason. Berowne confesses to breaking the oath, explaining that the only study worthy of mankind is that of love, and he and the other men collectively decide to relinquish the vow. Arranging for Holofernes to entertain the ladies later, the men then dress as Muscovites and court the ladies in disguise. The Princess's courtier Boyet, having overheard their planning, helps the ladies trick the men by disguising themselves as each other. When the lords return as themselves, the ladies taunt them and expose their ruse.

Impressed by the ladies' wit, the men apologize, and when all identities are righted, they watch Holofernes, Sir Nathaniel, Costard, Moth and Don Armado present the Nine Worthies. The four lords and Boyet heckle the play, saving their sole praise for Costard. Don Armado and Costard almost come to blows when Costard reveals mid-pageant that Don Armado has got Jaquenetta pregnant. Their spat is interrupted by news that the Princess's father has died. The Princess makes plans to leave at once, and she and her ladies, readying for mourning, declare that the men must wait a year and a day to prove their loves lasting. Don Armado announces he will swear a similar oath to Jaquenetta and then presents the nobles with a song.

== Sources ==
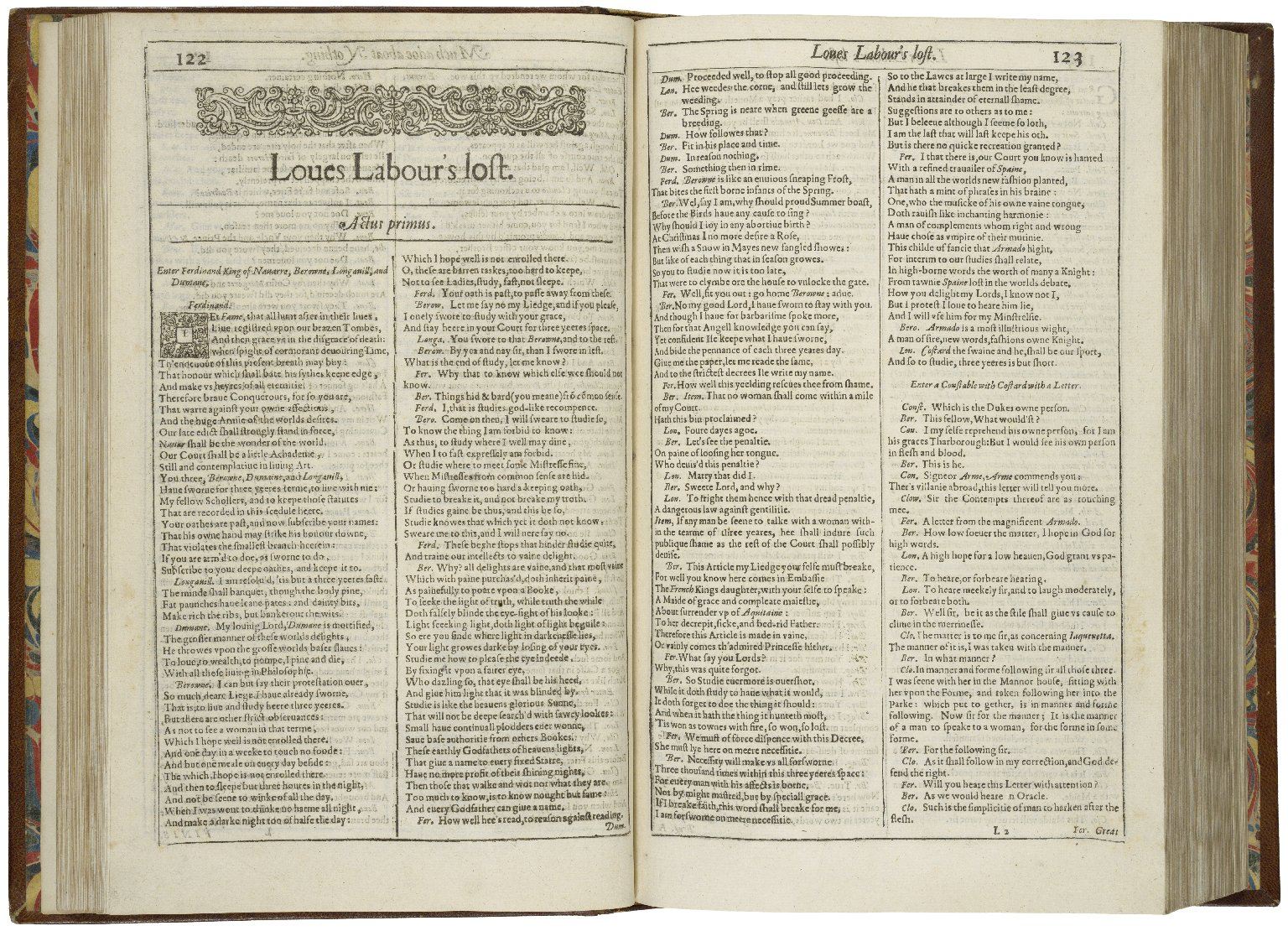
The first page of the play in the First Folio (1623)

Love's Labour's Lost may be found to have a number of sources for various aspects, but a primary source for the story is not extant. It has this in common with two other Shakespeare plays – A Midsummer Night's Dream and The Tempest. Some possible influences on Love's Labour's Lost can be found in the early plays of John Lyly, Robert Wilson's The Cobbler's Prophecy (c. 1590) and Pierre de La Primaudaye's L'Academie française (1577). Michael Dobson and Stanley Wells comment that it has often been conjectured that the plot derives from "a now lost account of a diplomatic visit made to Henry in 1578 by Catherine de' Medici and her daughter Marguerite de Valois, Henry's estranged wife, to discuss the future of Aquitaine, but this is by no means certain."

The four main male characters are all loosely based on historical figures; Navarre is based on Henry of Navarre (who later became Henry IV of France), Berowne on Charles de Gontaut, duc de Biron, Dumain on Charles, duc de Mayenne and Longaville on Henri I d'Orléans, duc de Longueville. Biron in particular was well known in England because Robert Devereux, 2nd Earl of Essex, had joined forces with Biron's army in support of Henry in 1591. Albert Tricomi states that "the play's humorous idealization could remain durable as long as the French names of its principal characters remained familiar to Shakespeare's audiences. This means that the witty portrayal of Navarre's court could remain reasonably effective until the assassination of Henry IV in 1610. ... Such considerations suggest that the portrayals of Navarre and the civil-war generals presented Elizabethan audiences not with a mere collection of French names in the news, but with an added dramatic dimension which, once lost, helps to account for the eclipse Love's Labour's Lost soon underwent."

Critics have attempted to draw connections between notable Elizabethan English persons and the characters of Don Armado, Moth, Sir Nathaniel, and Holofernes, with little success.

== Date and text ==
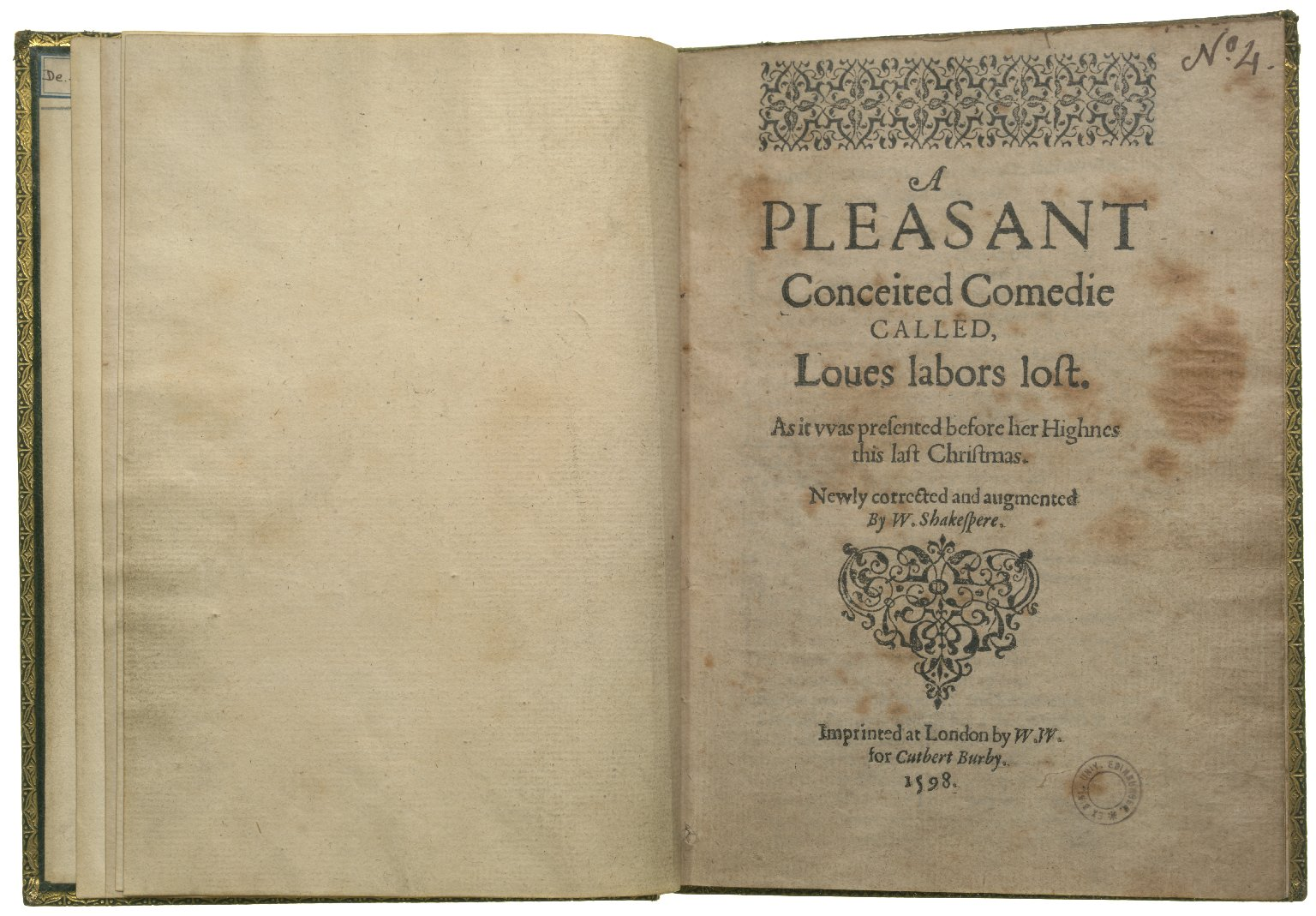
Frontispiece from Loues labors loſt, 1598 from the University of Edinburgh Heritage Collection

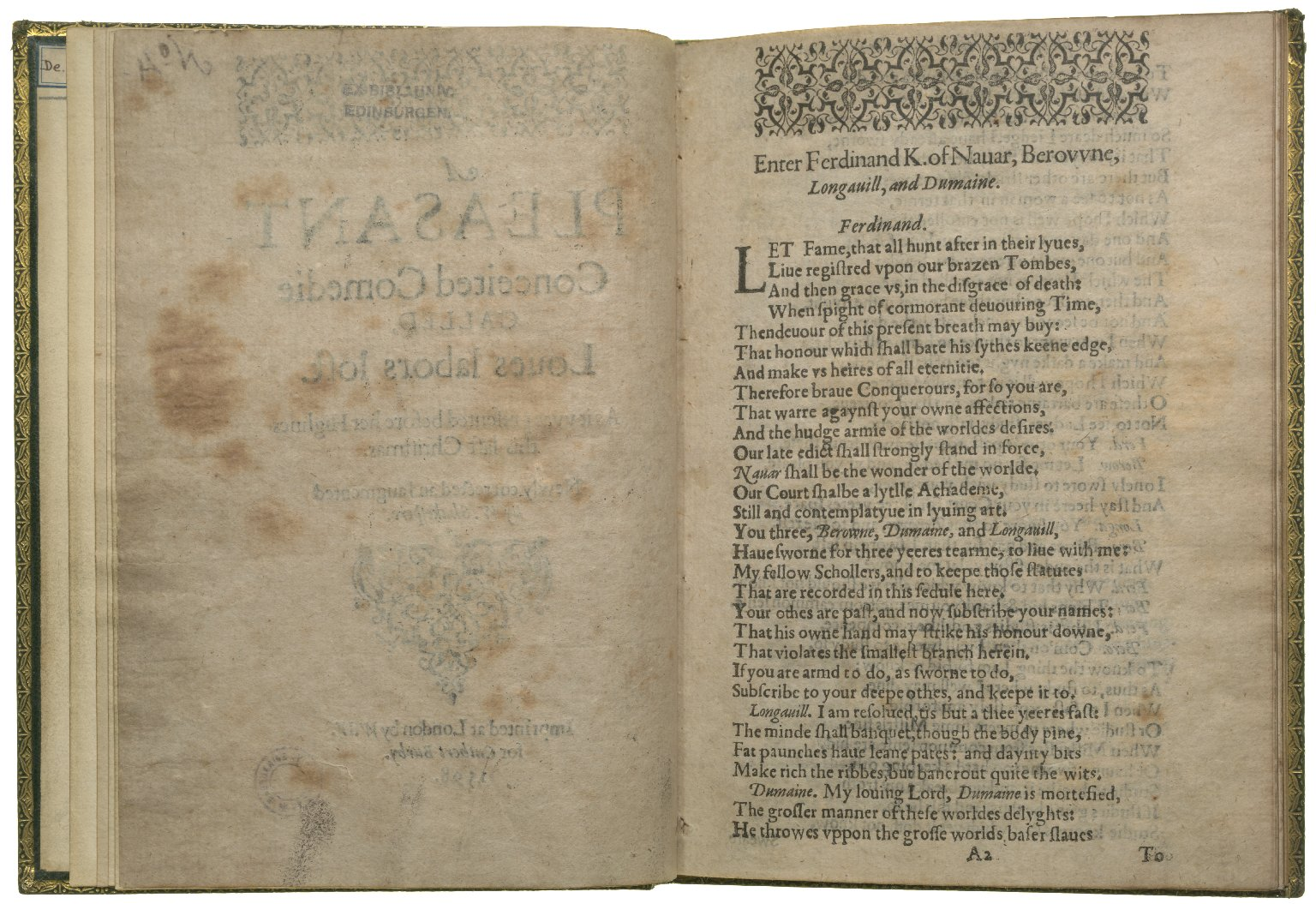
First page from Loues labors loſt, 1598, from the University of Edinburgh Heritage Collection

Most scholars believe the play was written in 1594–1595, but not later than 1598. Love's Labour's Lost was first published in quarto in 1598 by the bookseller Cuthbert Burby. The title page states that the play was "Newly corrected and augmented by W. Shakespere," which has suggested to some scholars a revision of an earlier version.

Dating to 1598, Edinburgh University's manuscript is one of the earliest known copies of the work and according to its title page, is the same version as that which was presented to Queen Elizabeth I the previous Christmas, in 1597. It is in quarto format and was donated to Edinburgh University between 1626 and 1636 by former student William Drummond of Hawthornden, making it part of the university's first literature collection.

The play next appeared in print in the First Folio in 1623, with a later quarto in 1631. Love's Labour's Won is considered by some to be a lost sequel.

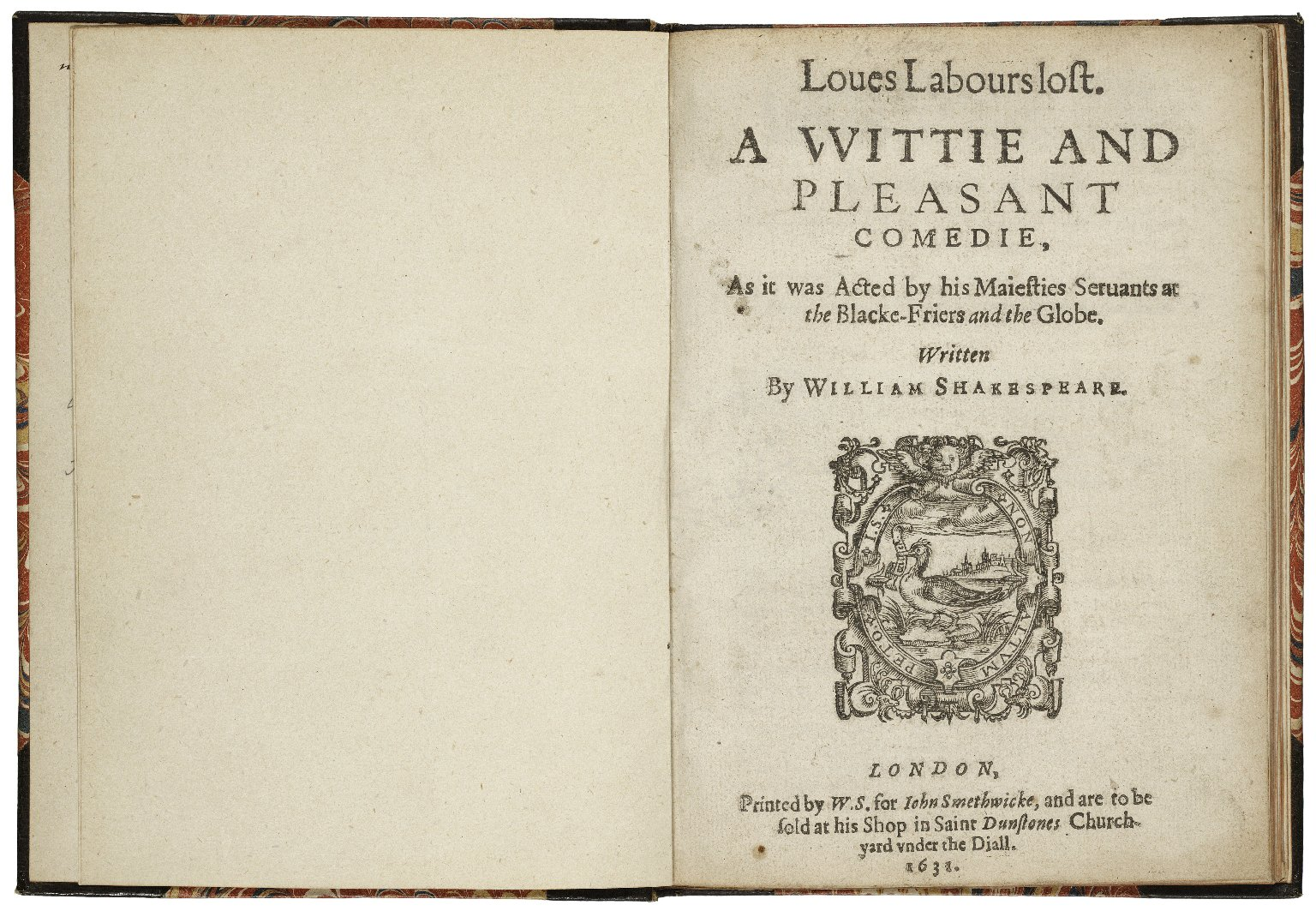
Title page of the second quarto (1631)

The speech given by Berowne at 4.3.284–361 is potentially the longest in all of Shakespeare's plays, depending on editorial choices. Shakespeare critic and editor Edward Capell has pointed out that certain passages within the speech seem to be redundant and argues that these passages represent a first draft which was not adequately corrected before going to print. Specifically, lines 291–313 are "repeated in substance" further in the speech and are sometimes omitted by editors. With no omissions, the speech is 77 lines and 588 words.

== Analysis and criticism ==
=== Title ===
The title is normally given as Love's Labour's Lost. The use of apostrophes varies in early editions. In its first 1598 quarto publication it appears as Loues labors loſt. In the 1623 First Folio it is Loues Labour's Lost and in the 1631 quarto it is Loues Labours Lost. In the Third Folio it appears for the first time with the modern punctuation and spelling as Love's Labour's Lost. Historian John Hale notes that the title could be read as "love's labour is lost" or "the lost labours of love" depending on punctuation (with no punctuation at all in this title being common in Shakespeare's day). Hale suggests that this parallel nature of product and process was intended and is derived from existing Latin idioms. Hale suggests that the witty alliteration of the title is in keeping with the pedantic nature of the play. In 1935 Frances Yates asserted that the title derived from a line in John Florio's His firste Fruites (1578): "We neede not speak so much of loue, al books are ful of lou, with so many authours, that it were labour lost to speake of Loue", a source from which Shakespeare also took the untranslated Venetian proverb Venetia, Venetia/Chi non ti vede non ti pretia (LLL 4.2.92–93) ("Venice, Venice, Who does not see you cannot praise you").

=== Reputation ===
Love's Labour's Lost abounds in sophisticated wordplay, puns, and literary allusions and is filled with clever pastiches of contemporary poetic forms. Critic and historian John Pendergast states that "perhaps more than any other Shakespearean play, it explores the power and limitations of language, and this blatant concern for language led many early critics to believe that it was the work of a playwright just learning his art." In The Western Canon (1994), Harold Bloom lauds the work as "astonishing" and refers to it as Shakespeare's "first absolute achievement". It is often assumed that the play was written for performance at the Inns of Court, whose students would have been most likely to appreciate its style. It has never been among Shakespeare's most popular plays, probably because its pedantic humour and linguistic density are extremely demanding of contemporary theatregoers. The satirical allusions of Navarre's court are likewise inaccessible, "having been principally directed to fashions of language that have long passed away, and [are] consequently little understood, rather than in any great deficiency of invention."

=== Themes ===
==== Masculine desire ====
Masculine desire structures the play and helps to shape its action. The men's sexual appetite manifests in their desire for fame and honour; the notion of women as dangerous to masculinity and intellect is established early on. The King and his Lords' desires for their idealized women are deferred, confused, and ridiculed throughout the play. As the play comes to a close, their desire is deferred yet again, resulting in an increased exaltation of the women.

Critic Mark Breitenberg commented that the use of idealistic poetry, popularized by Petrarch, effectively becomes the textualized form of the male gaze. In describing and idealizing the ladies, the King and his Lords exercise a form of control over women they love. Don Armado also represents masculine desire through his relentless pursuit of Jacquenetta. The theme of desire is heightened by the concern of increasing female sexuality throughout the Renaissance period and the consequent threat of cuckoldry. Politics of love, marriage, and power are equally forceful in shaping the thread of masculine desire that drives the plot.

==== Reckoning and rationalization ====
The term 'reckoning' is used in its multiple meanings throughout the Shakespeare canon. In Love's Labour's Lost in particular, it is often used to signify a moral judgement; most notably, the idea of a final reckoning as it relates to death. Though the play entwines fantasy and reality, the arrival of the messenger to announce the death of the Princess's father ultimately brings this notion to a head. Scholar Cynthia Lewis suggested that the appearance of the final reckoning is necessary in reminding the lovers of the seriousness of marriage. The need to settle the disagreement between Navarre and France likewise suggests an instance of reckoning, though this particular reckoning is settled offstage. This is presented in stark contrast to the final scene, in which the act of reckoning cannot be avoided. In acknowledging the consequences of his actions, Don Armado is the only one to deal with his reckoning in a noble manner. The Lords and the King effectively pass judgement on themselves, revealing their true moral character when mocking the players during the representation of the Nine Worthies.

Similar to reckoning is the notion of rationalization, which provides the basis for the swift change in the ladies' feelings for the men. The ladies are able to talk themselves into falling in love with the men due to the rationalization of the men's purported flaws. Lewis concluded that "the proclivity to rationalize a position, a like, or a dislike, is linked in Love's Labour's Lost with the difficulty of reckoning absolute value, whose slipperiness is indicated throughout the play."

==== Reality versus fantasy ====
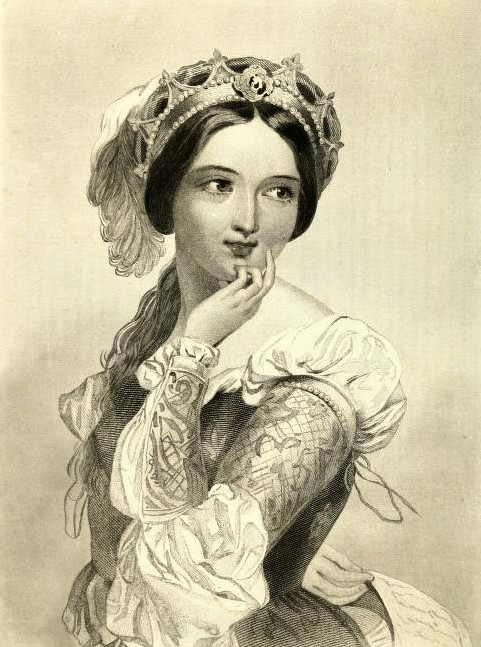
Princess of France (from an 1850 edition)

Critic Joseph Westlund wrote that Love's Labour's Lost functions as a "prelude to the more extensive commentary on imagination in A Midsummer Night's Dream." There are several plot points driven by fantasy and imagination throughout the play. The Lords and the King's declaration of abstinence is a fancy that falls short of achievement. This fantasy rests on the men's idea that the resulting fame will allow them to circumvent death and oblivion, a fantastical notion itself. Within moments of swearing their oath, it becomes clear that their fantastical goal is unachievable given the reality of the world, the unnatural state of abstinence itself, and the arrival of the Princess and her ladies. This juxtaposition ultimately lends itself to the irony and humour in the play.

The commoners represent the theme of reality and achievement versus fantasy via their production regarding the Nine Worthies. Like the men's fantastical pursuit of fame, the play within a play represents the commoners' concern with fame. The relationship between the fantasy of love and the reality of worthwhile achievement, a popular Renaissance topic, is also utilized throughout the play. Don Armado attempts to reconcile these opposite desires using Worthies who fell in love as model examples. Time is suspended throughout the play and is of little substance to the plot. The Princess, though originally "craving quick dispatch," quickly falls under the spell of love and abandons her urgent business. This suggests that the majority of the action takes place within a fantasy world. Only with the news of the Princess's father's death are time and reality reawakened.

=== Music ===
Unlike many of Shakespeare's plays, music plays a role only in the final scene of Love's Labour's Lost. The songs of spring and winter, titled "Ver and Hiems" and "The Cuckoo and the Owl", respectively, occur near the end of the play. Given the critical controversy regarding the exact dating of Love's Labour's Lost, there is some indication that "the songs belong to the 1597 additions."

Different interpretations of the meaning of these songs include: optimistic commentary for the future, bleak commentary regarding the recent announcement of death, or an ironic device by which to direct the King and his Lords towards a new outlook on love and life. In keeping with the theme of time as it relates to reality and fantasy, these are seasonal songs that restore the sense of time to the play. Due to the opposing nature of the two songs, they can be viewed as a debate on the opposing attitudes on love found throughout the play. Catherine McLay comments that the songs are functional in their interpretation of the central themes in Love's Labour's Lost. McLay also suggests that the songs negate what many consider to be a "heretical" ending for a comedy. The songs, a product of traditional comedic structure, are a method by which the play can be "[brought] within the periphery of the usual comic definition."

Critic Thomas Berger states that, regardless of the meaning of these final songs, they are important in their contrast with the lack of song throughout the rest of the play. In cutting themselves off from women and the possibility of love, the King and his Lords have effectively cut themselves off from song. Song is allowed into the world of the play at the beginning of Act III, after the Princess and her ladies have been introduced and the men begin to fall in love. Moth's song "Concolinel" indicates that the vows will be broken. In Act I, Scene II, Moth recites a poem but fails to sing it. Don Armado insists that Moth sing it twice, but he does not. Berger infers that a song was intended to be inserted at this point, but was never written. Had a song been inserted at this point of the play, it would have followed dramatic convention of the time, which often called for music between scenes.

== Performance history ==
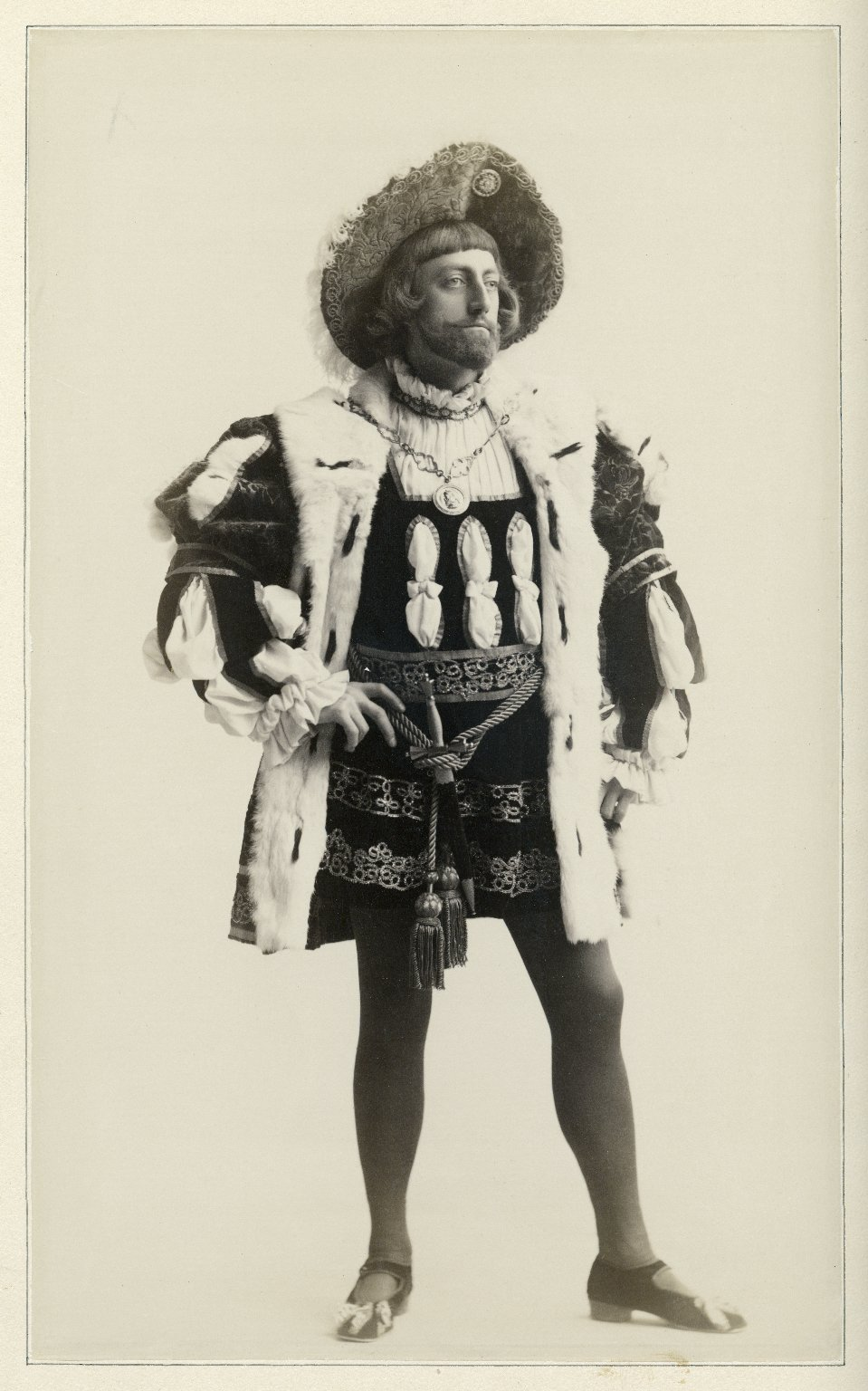
Photograph of John Drew as the King of Navarre in Augustin Daly's production

The earliest recorded performance of the play occurred at Christmas in 1597 at the Court before Queen Elizabeth. A second performance is recorded to have occurred in 1605, either at the house of the Earl of Southampton or at that of Robert Cecil, Lord Cranborne. The first known production after Shakespeare's era was not until 1839, at the Theatre Royal, Covent Garden, with Madame Vestris as Rosaline. The Times was unimpressed, stating: "The play moved very heavily. The whole dialogue is but a string of brilliant conceits, which, if not delivered well, are tedious and unintelligible. The manner in which it was played last night destroyed the brilliancy completely, and left a residuum of insipidity which was encumbered rather than relieved by the scenery and decorations." The only other performances of the play recorded in England in the 19th century were at Sadler's Wells in 1857 and the St. James's Theatre in 1886.

Notable 20th-century British productions included a 1936 staging at the Old Vic featuring Michael Redgrave as Ferdinand and Alec Clunes as Berowne. In 1949, the play was given at the New Theatre with Redgrave in the role of Berowne. The cast of a 1965 Royal Shakespeare Company production included Glenda Jackson, Janet Suzman and Timothy West. In 1968, the play was staged by Laurence Olivier for the National Theatre, with Derek Jacobi as the Duke and Jeremy Brett as Berowne. The Royal Shakespeare Company produced the play again in 1994. The critic Michael Billington wrote in his review of the production: "The more I see Love's Labour's Lost, the more I think it Shakespeare's most beguiling comedy. It both celebrates and satisfies linguistic exuberance, explores the often painful transition from youth to maturity, and reminds us of our common mortality."

In late summer 2005, an adaptation of the play was staged in the Dari language in Kabul, Afghanistan by a group of Afghan actors, and was reportedly very well received.

A 2009 staging by Shakespeare's Globe theatre, with artistic direction by Dominic Dromgoole, toured internationally. Ben Brantley, in The New York Times, called the production, seen at Pace University, "sophomoric". He postulated that the play itself "may well be the first and best example of a genre that would flourish in less sophisticated forms five centuries later: the college comedy."

In 2014, the Royal Shakespeare Company completed a double-feature in which Love's Labour's Lost, set on the eve of the First World War, is followed by Much Ado About Nothing (re-titled Love's Labour's Won). Dominic Cavendish of the Telegraph called it "the most blissfully entertaining and emotionally involving RSC offering I've seen in ages" and remarked that "Parallels between the two works – the sparring wit, the sex-war skirmishes, the shift from showy linguistic evasion to heart-felt earnestness – become persuasively apparent."

== Adaptations ==
=== Literature ===
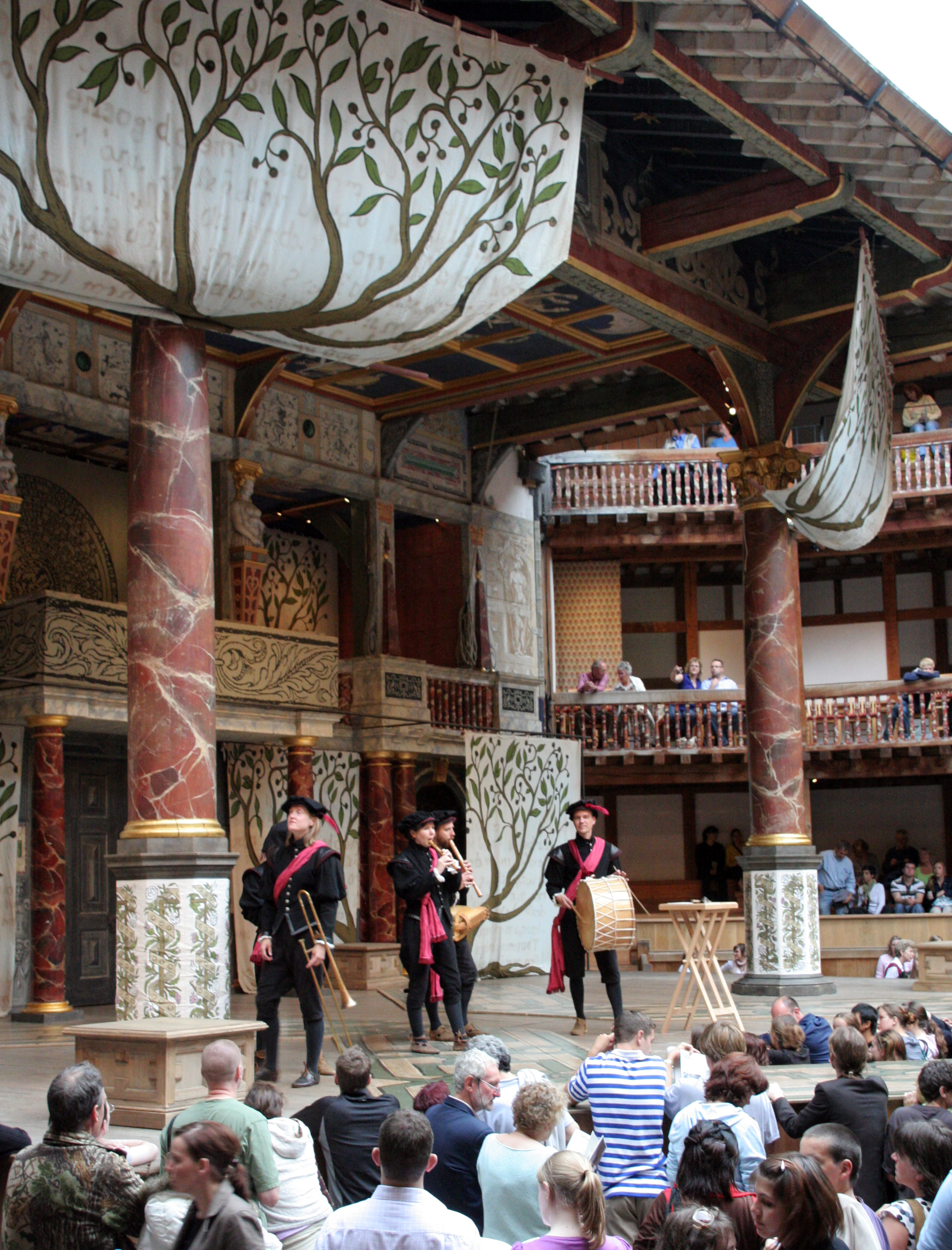
Start of a performance of Love's Labour's Lost at Shakespeare's Globe, London

Alfred Tennyson's poem The Princess (and, by extension, Gilbert and Sullivan's comic opera Princess Ida) is speculated by Gerhard Joseph to have been inspired by Love's Labour's Lost.

Thomas Mann, in his novel Doctor Faustus (1943), has the fictional German composer Adrian Leverkühn attempt to write an opera on the story of the play.

=== Musical theatre, opera, and plays ===
An opera of the same title as the play was composed by Nicolas Nabokov, with a libretto by W. H. Auden and Chester Kallman, and first performed in 1973.

In the summer of 2013, The Public Theater in New York City presented a musical adaptation of the play as part of their Shakespeare in the Park programming. This production marked the first new Shakespeare-based musical to be produced at the Delacorte Theater in Central Park since the 1971 mounting of The Two Gentlemen of Verona with music by Galt MacDermot. The adaptation of Love's Labour's Lost featured a score by Bloody Bloody Andrew Jackson collaborators Michael Friedman and Alex Timbers. Timbers also directed the production, which starred Daniel Breaker, Colin Donnell, Rachel Dratch, and Patti Murin, among others.

The 2004 ska musical The Big Life is based on Love's Labour's Lost, reworked to be about the Windrush generation arriving in London.

Marc Palmieri's 2015 play The Groundling, a farce the New York Times referred to as "half comedy and half tragedy", was billed as a "meditation on the meaning of the final moments of Love's Labour's Lost".

=== Film, television and radio ===
Kenneth Branagh's 2000 film adaptation relocated the setting to the 1930s and attempted to make the play more accessible by turning it into a musical. The film was a box office disappointment.

The play was one of the last works to be recorded for the BBC Television Shakespeare project, broadcast in 1985. The production set events in the eighteenth century, the costumes and sets being modeled on the paintings of Jean-Antoine Watteau. This was the only instance in the project of a work set in a period after Shakespeare's death. The play is featured in an episode of the British TV show Doctor Who. The episode, entitled The Shakespeare Code, focuses on Shakespeare himself and a hypothetical follow-up play, Love's Labour's Won, whose final scene is used as a portal for alien witches to invade Earth. All copies of this play disappear along with the witches.

BBC Radio 3 aired a radio adaptation on 16 December 1946, directed by Noel Illif, with music by Gerald Finzi scored for a small chamber orchestra. The cast included Paul Scofield. The music was subsequently converted into an orchestral suite. BBC Radio 3 aired another radio adaptation on 22 February 1979, directed by David Spenser, with music by Derek Oldfield. The cast included Michael Kitchen as Ferdinand; John McEnery as Berowne; Anna Massey as the Princess of France; Eileen Atkins as Rosaline; and Paul Scofield as Don Adriano.

A modern-language adaptation of the play, titled Groups of Ten or More People, was released online by Chicago-based company Littlebrain Theatre in July 2020. This adaptation, set during the early days of the COVID-19 pandemic, was filmed entirely over the digital conferencing platform Zoom.

== Notes ==
=== Editions ===
- Bate, Jonathan and Rasmussen, Eric (eds.) Love's Labour's Lost (The RSC Shakespeare; London: Macmillan, 2008)
- Arthos, John (ed.) Love's Labour's Lost (Signet Classic Shakespeare; New York: Signet, 1965; revised edition, 1988; 2nd revised edition 2004)
- Carroll, William C. (ed.) Love's Labour's Lost (The New Cambridge Shakespeare; Cambridge: Cambridge University Press, 2009)
- David, Richard T. (ed.) Love's Labour's Lost (The Arden Shakespeare, 2nd Series; London: Arden, 1951)
- Furness, H.H. (ed.) Love's Labour's Lost (A New Variourm Edition of Shakespeare; Philadelphia: J. B. Lippincott Company, 1904)
- Evans, G. Blakemore (ed.) The Riverside Shakespeare (Boston: Houghton Mifflin, 1974; 2nd edn., 1997)
- Greenblatt, Stephen; Cohen, Walter; Howard, Jean E. and Maus, Katharine Eisaman (eds.) The Norton Shakespeare: Based on the Oxford Shakespeare (London: Norton, 1997)
- Harbage, Alfred (ed.) Love's Labour's Lost (The Pelican Shakespeare; London: Penguin, 1963; revised edition 1973)
- Hart, H.C. (ed.) Love's Labour's Lost (The Arden Shakespeare, 1st Series; London: Arden, 1906)
- Hibbard, G.R. (ed.) Love's Labour's Lost (The Oxford Shakespeare; Oxford: Oxford University Press, 1990)
- Holland, Peter (ed.) Love's Labour's Lost (The Pelican Shakespeare, 2nd Edition; London: Penguin, 2000)
- Kerrigan, John (ed.) Love's Labour's Lost (The New Penguin Shakespeare; London: Penguin, 1982; revised edition 1996)
- Quiller-Couch, Arthur and Dover Wilson, John (eds.) Love's Labour' Lost (The New Shakespeare; Cambridge: Cambridge University Press, 1923; 2nd edn. edited by Dover Wilson only, 1962)
- Walton, Nicholas (ed.) Love's Labour's Lost (The New Penguin Shakespeare 2nd edition; London: Penguin, 2005)
- Wells, Stanley; Taylor, Gary; Jowett, John and Montgomery, William (eds.) The Oxford Shakespeare: The Complete Works (Oxford: Oxford University Press, 1986; 2nd ed., 2005)
- Werstine, Paul and Mowat, Barbara A. (eds.) Love's Labour's Lost (Folger Shakespeare Library; Washington: Simon & Schuster, 1996)
- Woudhuysen, H. R., ed. (1998). Love's Labour's Lost. Arden Shakespeare, 3rd series. London: Arden.
