= Patricia Johnson (mezzo-soprano) =

British operatic singer (1929–2024)

- Born: Patricia Marion Johnson; 21 October 1929; London, England
- Died: 17 December 2024 (aged 95)
- Occupation: Operatic mezzo-soprano
- Organizations: Sadler's Wells Opera; Basel Opera; Deutsche Oper Berlin; Royal Opera House

Patricia Marion Johnson (21 October 1929 – 17 December 2024) was an English operatic mezzo-soprano. She made an international career and is known for her dramatic voice and her stage presence. She appeared in leading roles of the repertory, such as Carmen and Eboli, and created new roles, such as the Baronin Grünwiesel in Henze's Der junge Lord, and the Princess in Nicolas Nabokov's Love's Labour's Lost.

== Life and career ==
Johnson was born in London, England on 21 October 1929, she studied voice there with Maria Linkers. She first worked as a choir member at the Royal Opera House. From 1954, she was a soloist at the Sadler's Wells Opera, where she appeared in the title role of Bizet's Carmen, as Dalila in Samson et Dalila by Camille Saint-Saëns, and as Azucena in Verdi's Il trovatore. From 1957, she worked at the Basel Opera, performing the title role of Rossini's La Cenerentola, among others. In 1961, she moved to the Deutsche Oper Berlin, where she appeared as Verdi's Azucena and Eboli in Don Carlos, and as Fricka in Wagner's Der Ring des Nibelungen. She created the role of Baronin Grünwiesel in Henze's Der junge Lord in 1965, and of the Princess in Nicolas Nabokov's Love's Labour's Lost in 1973. In 1975, she appeared as Countess Geschwitz in Alban Berg's Lulu, and in Francesco Cavalli's La Calisto.

She made her debut at the Salzburg Festival in 1962 as Marcellina in Mozart's Le nozze di Figaro, and performed the role of the Third Lady in his Die Zauberflöte a year later, directed by Otto Schenk and conducted by István Kertész. In 1965, she appeared there as Dorabella in his Così fan tutte, staged by Günther Rennert and directed by Karl Böhm, alongside Evelyn Lear as Fiordiligi. She appeared at the Glyndebourne Festival from 1965 to 1968, as Jane Seymour in Donizetti's Anna Bolena, as Lady Billows in Britten's Albert Herring, as the Sorcerer in Purcell's Dido and Aeneas, and as Storgé in Handel's Jephtha. She performed at the Royal Opera House the roles of the Countess de Coigny in Charpentier's Andrea Chénier, Andromache in Michael Tippett's King Priam, Queen Gertrude in Humphrey Searle's Hamlet, the Kostelnička in Janáček's Jenůfa, Marcellina, Baba the Turk in Stravinsky's The Rake's Progress, and Mrs. Sedley in Britten's Peter Grimes. Her roles also include Lady Macbeth in Verdi's Macbeth, Herodias in Salome and Adelaide in Arabella, both by Richard Strauss, Claire Zachanassian in Gottfried von Einem's Der Besuch der alten Dame, and the Old Lady in Leonard Bernstein's Candide.

Johnson was a singer in oratorio concerts and recitals. She recorded Bach's Easter Oratorio with Süddeutscher Madrigalchor, Süddeutsches Kammerorchester, Teresa Żylis-Gara, Theo Altmeyer and Dietrich Fischer-Dieskau, conducted by Wolfgang Gönnenwein.

Johnson died on 17 December 2024, at the age of 95.

== Recordings ==
Johnson recorded the role of the Sorceress in Dido and Aeneas in 1965, alongside Victoria de los Ángeles as Dido, with John Barbirolli conducting the English Chamber Orchestra. The original cast of Der junge Lord recorded the opera in 1967, two years after the premiere, conducted by Christoph von Dohnányi. In 1968, Johnson recorded the role of Marcellina in Figaro, conducted by Karl Böhm. The same year, and again with Böhm, she recorded the role of Countess Geschwitz in Lulu. She also appeared as Lady Macbeth in a BBC television film of Verdi's Macbeth.
