= Melusine (Reimann) =

Opera by Aribert Reimann

- Opera by Aribert Reimann
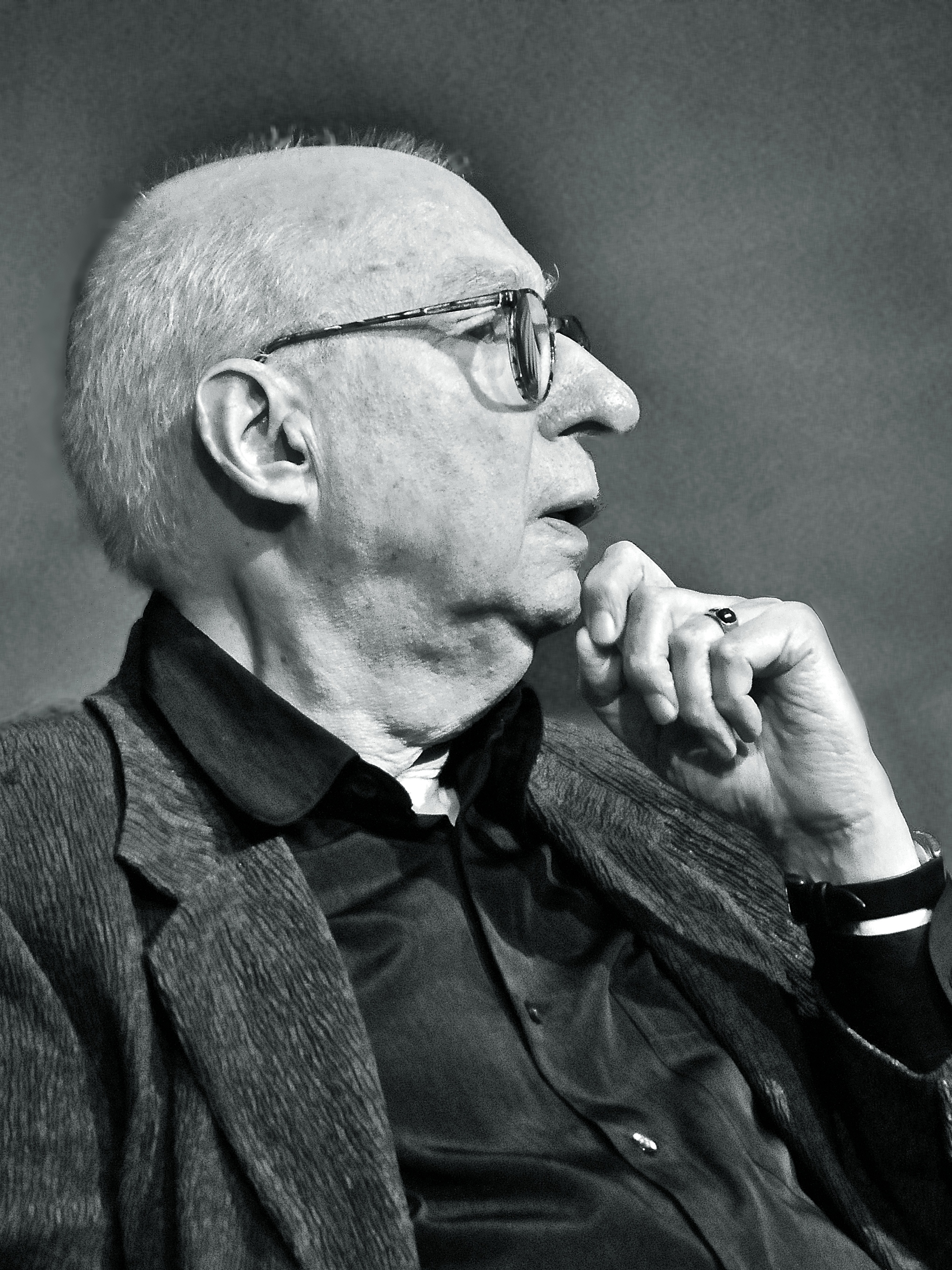
- The composer in 2010
- Librettist: Claus H. Henneberg
- Language: German
- Based on: Melusine by Yvan Goll
- Premiere: 29 April 1971; Schwetzingen Festival

Melusine is a 1971 German-language opera by Aribert Reimann, on a libretto by Claus H. Henneberg after Melusine, a 1920 play in four acts by Yvan Goll which transposes the legendary water-spirit to Goll's time. The opera was written for the Schwetzingen Festival, where it premiered in 1971. It was recorded in 2010.

== History ==
Melusine, Aribert Reimann's second opera, was written on the seventh commission from the Süddeutscher Rundfunk for a new opera for the Schwetzingen Festival, following for example Hans Werner Henze's Elegie für junge Liebende (1961) and Fortner's In seinem Garten liebt Don Perlimplin Belisa (1962). The libretto was written in German by Claus H. Henneberg, based on a 1920 play of the same name by Yvan Goll, which was again based on Mélusine, a French-language libretto written by Goll for an earlier – possibly unperformed – opera by Marcel Mihalovici in 1920.

== Plot ==
The title refers to the legendary water spirit Melusine. Derived from French legend and later a German folk book by Thüring von Ringoltingen, the topic is transposed to modern everyday life ("modernes Alltagsleben") in France before World War I. The main character is married to a real estate agent, but still a virgin, focused on the preservation of a local park (or forest) that she sees filled with nature spirits. She is unable to stop a castle being built on the land, a building in which she loses her virginity and dies.

== Performances ==
Melusine premiered at the opening of the festival Schlosstheater Schwetzingen in 1971, conducted by Reinhard Peters, staged by Rudolf Sellner, with Catherine Gayer in the title role, and Martha Mödl as Pythia. The opera was recorded by Wergo in 2010 from a live performance at the Staatstheater Nürnberg. A 1974 handbook on opera production notes the features of aleatoric passages, dissonances and atonality. A reviewer of The Guardian described the musical language as neo-expressionist, with writing for voices in declamatory style and with demanding coloraturas. A reviewer of the premiere, writing for the weekly Die Zeit, found the vocal writing for the three main characters convincing, and compared the work's expressivity to Alban Berg's Lulu and its atmosphere to Debussy's Pelléas et Mélisande, noting the similarities of the three female characters.

In 2016, a production by the Berlin University of the Arts, where Reimann had been a professor of contemporary Lied, honoured the composer's 80th birthday.

After Reimann's death, Oper Frankfurt staged the opera in 2025 directed by Aileen Schneider; it was played on a central round stage at the Bockenheimer Depot, with Anna Nekhames in the title role.

== Roles ==
Roles, voice types, premiere cast
Role	Voice type	Premiere cast, 29 April 1971 Conductor: Reinhard Peters
Melusine	coloratura soprano	Catherine Gayer
Pythia	contralto	Martha Mödl
Madame Lapérouse	mezzo-soprano	Gitta Mikes
Oleander	tenor	Donald Grobe
Graf von Lusignan	baritone	Barry McDaniel
Surveyor	bass-baritone	Ivan Sardi
Mason	bass	Klaus Lang
Architect	tenor	Loren Driscoll
Oger	bass	Josef Greindl
