= Tre Canti di Leopardi =

1965 song cycle by Wilhelm Killmayer

- Orchestral songs by Wilhelm Killmayer
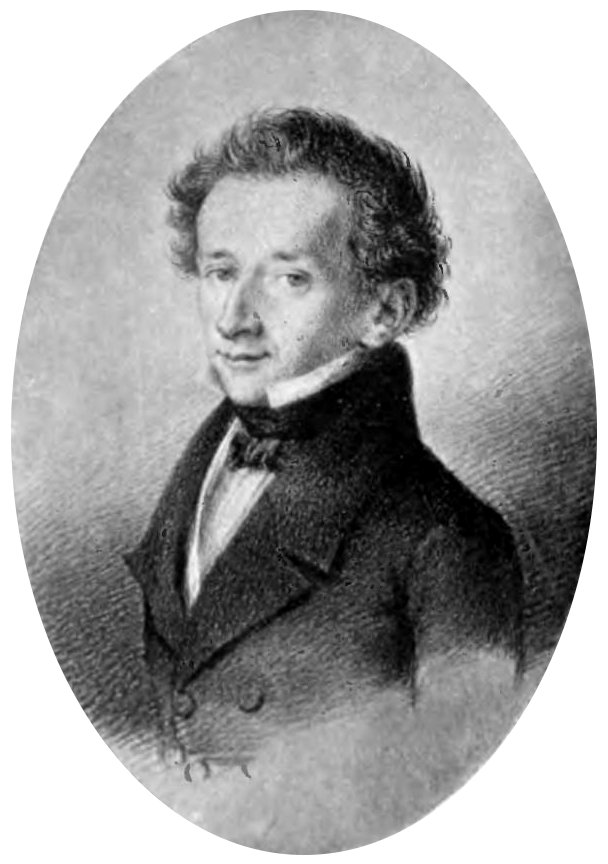
- Portrait of Giacomo Leopardi who wrote the poems
- Text: poems from Canti
- Composed: 1965
- Duration: 14 min
- Movements: three
- Scoring: baritone; orchestra

Tre Canti di Leopardi (Three songs by Leopardi) is a series of three orchestral songs composed by Wilhelm Killmayer in 1965 for baritone and orchestra. He set three poems in Italian from the collection Canti by Giacomo Leopardi.

== History ==
Interested in poetry and the voice, Killmayer composed more than 200 Lieder. He wrote Tre Canti di Leopardi in 1965 as a setting of three poems in Italian from the collection Canti by Giacomo Leopardi. He wrote the work for baritone and orchestra. The songs take about 14 minutes to perform.

1. L'infinito (The Infinite)
2. A se stesso (To Himself)
3. Alla luna (To the Moon)

From the expansive collection, Killmayer chose three poems from different periods. For the first song, he selected the early L'Infinito (The Infinite, 1819), which begins "Sempre caro mi fu quest'ermo colle" (It was always dear to me, this solitary hill,). He marked his setting "Moderato, tranquillo".

For the second song, he selected the later A se stesso (To Himself, 1833), which has been described as a "suicidal assessment", written in concise lines of sometimes only one to three words per line. Beginning "Or poserai per sempre" (Now you will rest forever), it talks about the death of the ultimate illusion.

For the third song, he selected another early poem, Alla luna (To the Moon, 1819). The beginning, "O graziosa luna, io mi rammento" (O lovely moon, now I am reminded), has been described as an address to a light both ideal ("graziosa luna") and beloved ("mia diletta luna"). Killmayer marked his setting "Tranquillo".

The work was first performed on 11 July 1967 in Munich as part of the festival Allgemeines Deutsches Musikfest München 1967. The soloist Barry McDaniel sang with the Münchner Philharmoniker, conducted by Reinhard Peters. A recording was chosen in 2006 to represent orchestral songs for the sound documentary Musik in Deutschland 1950–2000. It was performed by Thomas Mohr and the Symphonieorchester des Bayerischen Rundfunks, conducted by Georg W. Schmöhe. Other songs of the collection were Henze's Neapolitanische Lieder, Reimann's Lines, and songs by Reiner Bredemeyer, Hanns Eisler, Siegfried Matthus, Ernst Hermann Meyer and Manfred Trojahn.
