= Canti (poetry collection) =

Collection of poems by Giacomo Leopardi

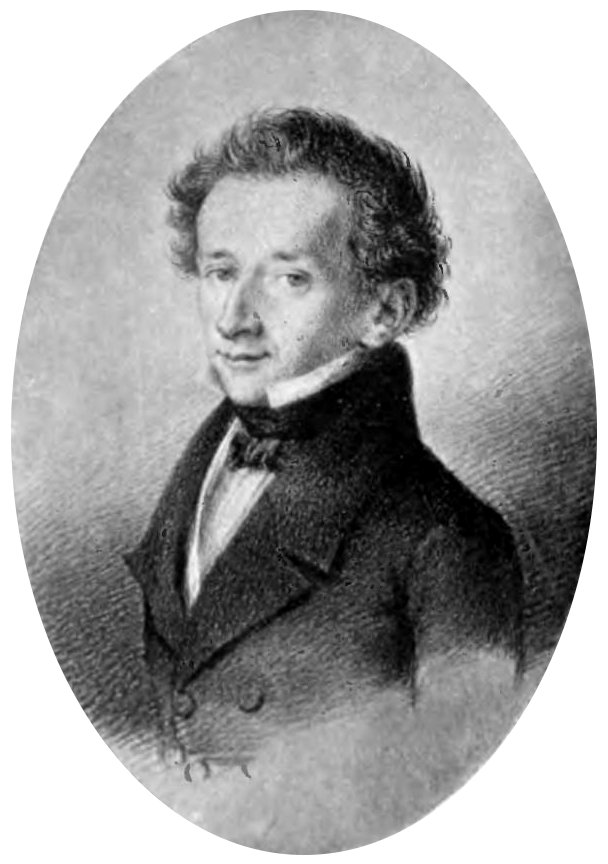
Leopardi

Canti is a collection of poems by Giacomo Leopardi written in 1835. The Canti is generally considered one of the most significant works of Italian poetry.

== List of poems ==
=== The first poems of the Canti ===
All'Italia and Sopra il monumento di Dante marked the beginning of the series of major works. In the two canti, the concept of "excessive" or "over-civilization" which is deleterious for life and beauty first makes it appearance. In the poem All'Italia, Leopardi laments the fallen at the Battle of Thermopylae (480 BC, fought between the Greeks under Leonidas and the Persians under Xerxes), and evokes the greatness of the past. In the second canto, he asks for pity from Dante for the pathetic state of his fatherland. In the great canti which follow (forty-one, including fragments), there is a gradual abandonment of the reminiscences, of literary allusions and of conventionalisms.

In 1819, the poet attempted to escape from his oppressive domestic situation, travelling to Rome. But he was caught by his father. In this period, his personal pessimism evolves into the peculiar intellectual philosophical pessimism of Leopardi.

Le Rimembranze and L'appressamento della morte also belong to this early period of the art of Leopardi.

==== L'Infinito ====
The highest expression of poetry is reached in Leopardi in L'Infinito, which is at once philosophy and art, since in the brief harmony of the verses are concentrated the conclusions of long philosophical meditations. The theme is a concept, which mind can only with extreme difficulty conceive. The poet narrates an experience he often has when he sits in a secluded place on a hill. His eyes cannot reach the horizon, because of a hedge surrounding the site; his thought, instead, is able to imagine spaces without limits. The silence is deep; when a breath of wind comes, this voice sounds like the voice of present time, and by contrast it evokes all times past, and eternity. Thus, the poet's thought is overwhelmed by new and unknown suggestions, but "il naufragar m'è dolce in questo mare" ("shipwreck / seems sweet to me in this sea." English translation by A. S. Kline).

=== The Canzoni (1820–1823) ===
Leopardi returns to the evocation of ancient eras and exhorts his contemporaries to seek in the writings of the classics the noble ancient virtues.

==== Ad Angelo Mai ====
In occasion of the discovery of the De Republica of Cicero on the part of Mai, Leopardi wrote the poem Ad Angelo Mai ("To Angelo Mai") in which he invokes the figure of Tasso to which he felt so attached.

==== Nelle nozze della sorella Paolina ====
In the lyrical Nelle nozze ("On the marriage of my sister Paolina"), which were never celebrated, in the course of wishing happiness for his sister, the poet uses the opportunity to exalt the strength and the virtue of the women of antiquity and to denigrate his own time because it did not allow one to be virtuous and happy, since only after death are those who have lived a morally good life praised.

==== Ad un vincitor di pallone ====
The canto Ad un vincitor di pallone ("To the winner of a game of football") expresses disdain for the tedium of a life that is nothing but a monotonous repetition of human affairs and to which only danger can restore value: only he who has been near the gates of death is able to find sweetness in life.

==== Bruto minore ====
In Bruto minore ("Brutus the Younger"), Brutus the assassin of Caesar is depicted as a man who has always believed in honor, virtue and liberty and who has ultimately sacrificed everything for these ideals. He has come to the realization, too late to change things, that everything was done in vain, that everything has been pointless, that he will even die dishonoured and disgraced for his well-intentioned actions.

His meditations bring him to the conclusion that morality is meaningless; Jove rewards only the selfish and plays arbitrary games with hapless mankind. Man is more unhappy than the rest of the animal kingdom because the latter do not know that they are unhappy and therefore do not meditate on the question of suicide and, even if they could, nothing would prevent them from carrying out the act without hesitation.

==== Ultimo canto di Saffo ====
Saffo (Sappho) is also a tragic figure. In fact, she is a great and generous spirit, an exceptional mind and a sublime character trapped in a miserable body. Saffo loved the light (Faone) but her life was made of shadow; she loved nature and beauty, but nature has been like an evil stepmother to her and she, who is sensitive, cultured and refined, is closed in the prison of a deformed body. Nor can the greatness of her genius help to release her from this horror.

In Saffo, Leopardi sees himself reflected, but in reality the poetess of Lesbos was neither deformed nor unhappy as she is depicted by Leopardi, who based his depiction on a false traditional belief of the time. Saffo knew, tasted, and sang of beauty and love more than was possible for Leopardi. But the resignation to unhappiness, to pain and to solitude, and the renunciation of the joys of life, sounds in the verses of Leopardi like the sincere sigh of a feminine soul.

The canto is a sweet apostrophe to the placid nights, once dear to the serene poetess, but the words turn rapidly to a violent evocation of nature in tempest which echoes her inner turmoil. The anguishing and accusative questions which Leopardi poses to a destiny which has denied beauty to the miserable Saffo are cut short by the thought of death. After having wished to the man she has loved in vain that little bit of happiness which is possible to attain on this earth, Saffo concludes by affirming that of all the hopes for joy, of all the illusions, there remains to await her only Tartarus.

==== Alla primavera and Al conte Carlo Pepoli ====
The canti Alla primavera ("To Spring") and Al conte Carlo Pepoli ("To Count Carlo Pepoli") emerge from the same spiritual situation. The first laments the fall of the great illusions ("gli ameni inganni") and the imaginary mythological worlds of the past, which embellished and enriched the fantasy of man. The second decries the loss of happiness that has resulted.

In Alla primavera, Leopardi praises the ancient times when the nymphs populated the fields, the woods, the springs, the flowers and the trees. Although the lyrical style is apparently classical, it is also pervaded by the characteristic dissatisfaction with the present of the romantics. Leopardi, here, romanticizes the pure intentions of the Greeks, since he was actually romantic in his sentiments and classical in his imagination and intellect.

In the Epistolario a Carlo Pepoli, Leopardi attempts to prove to his friend the thesis (reminiscent of Buddhism) according to which, since life has no other aim but happiness and since happiness is unattainable, all of life is nothing but an interminable struggle. But he who refuses to work is oppressed by the tedium of life and must seek distraction in useless pastimes. Moreover, those who dedicate themselves to poetry, if they have no fatherland, are tormented more than those who do by a lack of freedom because they fully appreciate the value of the idea of nationhood.

At this point, a disillusioned Leopardi considers abandoning poetry for philosophy, but without any hope of glory. He has resigned himself to the certainty of pain and of boredom to which mankind is condemned and he therefore believes it necessary to abandon the illusions and poetry in order to speculate on the laws and destiny of the universe.

=== New Canti (1823–1832) ===
After 1823, Leopardi abandoned the myths and illustrious figures of the past, which he now considered to be transformed into meaningless symbols and turned to writing about suffering in a more "cosmic" sense.

==== Alla sua donna ====
In 1823, he wrote the canto Alla sua donna ("To his woman"), in which he expresses his ardent aspiration for a feminine ideal which, with love, might render life beautiful and desirable. During his youth, he had dreamt in vain of encountering a woman who embodied such a feminine ideal: a platonic idea, perfect, untouchable, pure, incorporeal, evanescent, and illusory.

It is a hymn not to one of Leopardi's many "loves," but to the discovery that he had unexpectedly made—at that summit of his life from which he would later decline—that what he had been seeking in the lady he loved was "something" beyond her, that was made visible in her, that communicated itself through her, but was beyond her.

==== Risorgimento ====
In 1828, Leopardi returned to lyric poetry with Risorgimento ("Resurgence"). The poem is essentially a history of the spiritual development of the poet from the day in which he came to believe that every pulse of life had died out in his soul to the moment in which the lyrical and the sentimental were reawakened in him. A strange torpor had rendered him apathetic, indifferent to suffering, to love, to desire, and to hope. Life had seemed desolate to him until the ice began to melt and the soul, reawakening, finally felt the revivification of the ancient illusions. Having reconquered the gift of sentiment, the poet accepts life as it is because it is revived by the feeling of suffering which torments his heart and, so long as he lives, he will not rebel against those who condemn him to live. This recovered serenity consists in the contemplation of one's own conscience of one's own sentiments, even when desolation and despair envelop the soul.

Leopardi rejoices to have rediscovered in himself the capacity to be moved and to experience pain, after a long period of impassibility and boredom. With Risorgimento, lyricism is reawakened in the poet, who composes canti, generally brief, in which a small spark or a scene is expanded, extending itself into an eternal vision of existence. He revokes images, memories and moments of past happiness.

==== A Silvia ====
In 1828, Leopardi composed perhaps his most famous poem, A Silvia ("To Silvia"). The young lady of the title—possibly the daughter of a servant in the Leopardi household—is the image of the hopes and illusions of the young poet, destined to succumb far too early in the struggle against reality, just as the youth of Silvia is destroyed by tuberculosis, the "chiuso morbo". It is often asked whether Leopardi was actually in love with this young woman, but to seek confirmation in biographical evidence is to miss the point of the poem. A Silvia is the expression of a profound and tragic love of life itself, which Leopardi, despite all the suffering, the psychological torments and the negative philosophizing, could not suppress in his spirit. This poem demonstrates why Leopardi's so-called "nihilism" does not run deep enough to touch the well-spring of his poetry: his love of man, of nature, and of beauty. However, the accusation Leopardi makes against Nature is very strong, as being responsible for the sweet dreams of youth and for the subsequent suffering, after "the appearance of truth" (l'apparir del vero, v.60) has shattered them.

==== Il passero solitario ====
The canto Il passero solitario ("The Lonely Sparrow") is of a classical perfection for the structure of the verses and for the sharpness of the images. Leopardi contemplates the bounty of nature and the world which smiles at him invitingly, but the poet has become misanthropic and disconsolate with the declining of his health and youth and the deprivation of all joy. He senses the feast which nature puts forth to him, but is unable to take part in it and foresees the remorse which will assail him in the years to come when he will regret the youthful life that he never lived. In this sense, he is alone just like, or worse than, the sparrow, since the latter lives alone by instinct, while the poet is endowed with reason and free will.

==== Le Ricordanze ====
In 1829, at Recanati, where he was constrained to return, against his wishes, because of increasing infirmity and financial difficulties, the poet wrote Le Ricordanze ("Memories"), perhaps the poem where autobiographical elements are the most evident. It narrates the story of the painful joy of the man who feels his sentiments to be stirred by seeing again places full of childhood and adolescence memories. These sentiments now confront a horrible and merciless reality and deep regret for lost youth. The ephemeral happiness is embodied in Nerina (a character perhaps based on the same inspiration as Silvia, Teresa Fattorini).

Nerina and Silvia are both dreams, evanescent phantasms; life for Leopardi is an illusion, the only reality being death. The woman, Silvia, Nerina, or "la sua donna" are always only the reflection of the poet himself, since life itself is, for him, an elusive and deceptive phantasm.

==== La quiete dopo la tempesta ====
In 1829, Leopardi wrote La quiete dopo la tempesta ("The Calm After the Storm"), in which the light and reassuring verses at the beginning evolve into the dark desperation of the concluding strophe, where pleasure and joy are conceived of as only momentary cessations of suffering and the highest pleasure is provided only by death.

==== Il sabato del villaggio ====
The same year's Il sabato del villaggio ("Saturday in the village"), like La quiete dopo la tempesta, opens with the depiction of the calm and reassuring scene of the people of the village (Recanati) preparing for Sunday's rest and feast. Later, just as in the other poem, it expands into deep, though brief and restrained, poetic-philosophical considerations on the emptiness of life: the joy and illusion of expectation must come to an unsatisfactory end in the Sunday feast; likewise, all the sweet dreams and expectations of youth will turn into bitter disillusion.

==== Canto notturno di un pastore errante dell'Asia ====
Around the end of 1829 or the first months of 1830, Leopardi composed the Canto notturno di un pastore errante dell'Asia ("Night-time chant of a wandering Asian shepherd"). In writing this piece, Leopardi drew inspiration from the reading of Voyage d'Orenbourg à Boukhara fait en 1820 of the Russian baron Meyendorff, in which the baron tells of how certain sheep-herders of central Asia belonging to the Kirghiz population practiced a sort of ritual chant consisting of long and sweet strophes directed at the full moon. The canto, which is divided into five strophes of equal length, takes the form of a dialogue between a sheep-herder and the moon. Nevertheless, the canto begins with the words "Che fai tu Luna in ciel? Dimmi, che fai, / silenziosa Luna?" ("What do you do Moon in the sky? Tell me, what do you do, / silent Moon?"). Throughout the entire poem, in fact, the moon remains silent, and the dialogue is transformed therefore into a long and urgent existential monologue of the sheep-herder, in desperate search of explanations to provide a sense to the pointlessness of existence.

In this period, Leopardi's relations with his family are reduced to a minimum and he is constrained to maintain himself on his own financially. In 1830, after sixteen months of "notte orribile" (awful night), he accepted a generous offer from his Tuscan friends, which enabled him to leave Recanati.

=== Last Canti (1832–1837) ===
In the last canti, philosophical investigation predominates, with the exception of Tramonto della Luna ("Decline of the Moon") which is a decisive return to idyllic lyricism.

==== Il pensiero dominante ====
In 1831, Leopardi wrote Il pensiero dominante ("The Dominating Thought"), which exalts love as a living or vitalizing force in itself, even when it is unrequited. The poem, however, features only the desire for love without the joy and the vitalizing spirit and, therefore, remaining thought, illusion. Leopardi destroys everything, condemns everything, but wishes to save love from the universal miasma and protect it at least within the profundity of his own soul. The more desolate the solitude which surrounds him, the more tightly he grasps onto love as the faith in his idealized, illusory, eternal woman ("sua donna") who placates suffering, disillusion and bitterness. The poet of universal suffering sings of a good which surpasses the ills of life and, for an instant, seems to become the singer of a possible happiness. But the idea of death as the only hope for man returns, since the world offers only two beautiful things: love and death.

Il pensiero dominante represents the first ecstatic moment of love, which almost nullifies the awareness of human unhappiness. It is worth the price of tolerating the suffering of a long life in order to experience the joy of such beauty. Il pensiero dominante and Il risorgimento are the only poems of joy written by Leopardi, though even in those two poems there always reappears, inextinguishable, the pessimism which sees in the object of joy a vain image created by the imagination.

==== Amore e Morte ====
The concept of the love-death duality is taken up again in the 1832 canto Amore e Morte ("Love and Death"). It is a meditation on the torment and annihilation which accompanies love. Love and death, in fact, are twins: the one is the generator of all things beautiful and the other puts an end to all ills. Love makes strong and cancels the fear of death and when it dominates the soul, it makes it desire death. Some, who are won over by passion, will die for it happily. Others kill themselves because of the wounds of love. But happiness consists in dying in the drunkenness of passion. Of the two twins, Leopardi dares to invoke only death, which is no longer symbolized by the horrid Ade of Saffo, but by a young virgin who grants peace for eternity. Death is the sister of love and is the great consoler who, along with her brother, is the best that the world can offer.

==== Consalvo ====
Also in 1832, inspired by a 17th-century poem by Girolamo Graziani titled La conquista di Granada ("The Capture of Granada"), Leopardi wrote Consalvo. Consalvo obtains a kiss from the woman he has long loved unrequitedly only when, gravely injured, he is at the point of death. Consalvo is different from the other canti in that it has the form of a novella in verse or of a dramatic scene. It is the fruit of the sentimental and languid literature which characterized much of the romanticism outside of Italy.

==== Aspasia ====
Written in 1834, Aspasia emerges, like Consalvo, from the painful experience of desperate and unrequited love for Fanny Targioni Tozzetti. Aspasia-Fanny is the only real woman represented in the poetry of Leopardi. Aspasia is the able manipulator whose perfect body hides a corrupt and prosaic soul. She is the demonstration that beauty is dishonest.

The poet, vainly searching for love, takes his revenge on destiny and the women who have rejected him, above all Targioni, whose memory continues to disturb the poet after more than a year away from her. The memory of the woman loved in vain constantly returns, but the canto, inspired by disdain for the provocative and, simultaneously, distancing behavior of the woman also expresses resignation to one's fate and the pride of having been able to recover one's own independence. Aspasia, in her limitedness as a woman cannot grasp the profundity of masculine thought.

==== Sopra un bassorilievo antico sepolcrale ====
In the canto Sopra un bassorilievo antico sepolcrale ("On an Ancient Sepulchre Bas-relief"), a young woman has died and is represented in the act of saying goodbye to her loved ones. The poet weighs the pros and cons of death, remaining in doubt about whether the young woman's destiny is good or bad.

Leopardi, even while being highly conscious of the indifference of nature, never ceased entirely to love it. In these verses, the poet poses challenging and pointed questions to nature, enumerating the ills and sufferings which, because of death, are inflicted on humanity. Under the influence of love, the poet had apparently found happiness at least in death (Il pensiero dominante, Amore e morte). Now, instead, even this last illusion has fallen and he sees nothing but unhappiness everywhere.

==== Sopra il ritratto di una bella donna ====
Sopra il ritratto di una bella donna scolpito nel monumento sepolcrale della medesima ("On the portrait of a beautiful woman sculpted in her sepulchral monument") is basically an extension of the above.

The poet, drawing his inspiration from a funerary sculpture, evokes the image of a beautiful woman and compares her breathtaking beauty to the heart-rendingly sad image that she has become; one that is no more than mud, dust and skeleton. As well as being centred on the transience of beauty and of human things, the poem points to the specular antinomy between human ideals and natural truth. Leopardi does not deny—if anything, he emphasizes—the beauty of the human species in general, and by the end of the poem extends his point to all possible forms of beauty, intellectual as well as aesthetic.

==== La ginestra ====
In 1836, while staying near Torre del Greco in a villa on the hillside of Vesuvius, Leopardi wrote his moral testament as a poet, La Ginestra ("The Broom"), also known as Il Fiore del Deserto ("The flower of the desert"). The poem consists of 317 verses and uses free strophes of hendecasyllables and septuplets as its meter. It is the longest of all the Canti and has an unusual beginning. In fact, among all the Leopardian canti only this one begins with a scene of desolation, to be followed by an alternation between the enchantment of the panorama and of the starry night sky. On the literary level, it is the maximum realization of that anti-idyllic "new poetic" with which Leopardi had already experimented from the 1830s.

Leopardi, after having described the nothingness of the world and of man with respect to the universe; after having lamented the precariousness of the human condition threatened by the capriciousness of nature, not as exceptional evils but as continuous and constant; and after having satirized the arrogance and the credulity of man, who propounds ideas of progress and hopes, even while knowing he is mortal, to render himself eternal, concluded with the observation that reciprocal solidarity is the only defence against the common enemy which is nature (see Operette morali, "Dialogo di Plotino e Porfirio").

In this canto, in which Leopardi expresses his vast thought about mankind, history, and nature, autobiographical elements can be found: both direct (the places described are those who surround the poet in his late years) and indirect, in the image of a man who is poor, weak, but courageous enough to be aware of his real condition. The humble plant of ginestra, living in desolate places without surrendering to the force of Nature, resembles this ideal man, who rejects any illusions about himself and does not invoke from Heaven (or Nature) an impossible help.

Vesuvius, the great mountain which brings destruction, dominates the entire poem. The only attainable truth is death, toward which man must inexorably advance, abandoning every illusion and becoming conscious of his own miserable condition. Such awareness will placate the mutual hatreds.

==== Il tramonto della Luna ====
Il tramonto della Luna ("The Waning of the Moon"), the last canto, was composed by Leopardi in Naples shortly before his death. The moon wanes, leaving nature in total darkness, just as youth passes away leaving life dark and derelict. The poet seems to presage the imminence of his own death.

In 1845, Ranieri published the definitive edition of the Canti according to the will of the author.

== Music ==
Wilhelm Killmayer set three of the Canti to music for baritone and orchestra in Tre Canti di Leopardi in 1965.
