= Die tödlichen Wünsche =

1959 opera by Giselher Klebe

- Opera by Giselher Klebe
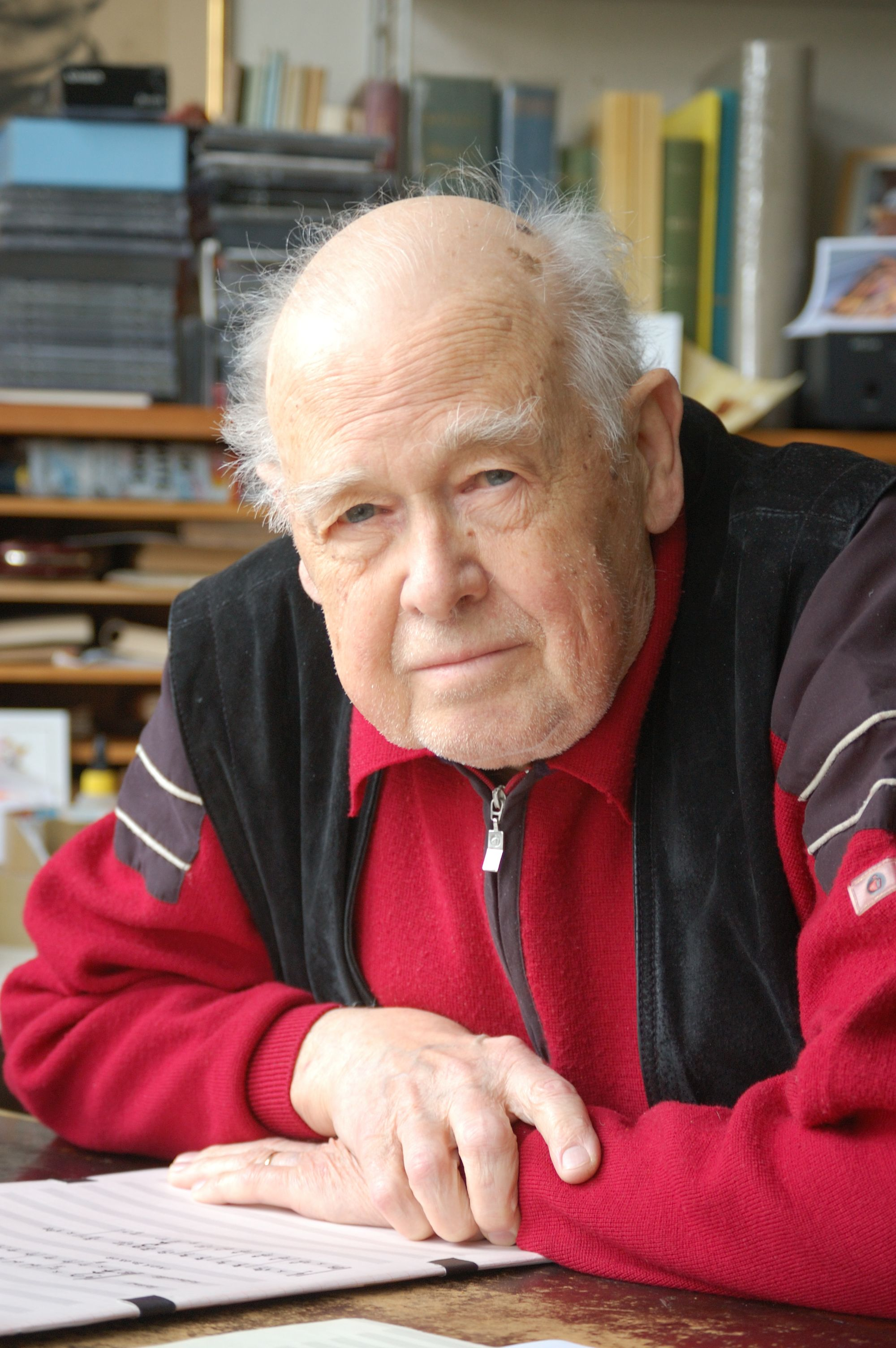
- The composer in 2008
- Translation: The Deadly Wishes
- Librettist: Giselher Klebe
- Language: German
- Based on: La Peau de chagrin by Honoré de Balzac
- Premiere: 14 June 1959; Deutsche Oper am Rhein, Düsseldorf

Die tödlichen Wünsche (The Deadly Wishes), Op. 27, is an opera by Giselher Klebe who also wrote the libretto based on La Peau de chagrin by Honoré de Balzac. It consists of fifteen lyrical scenes in three acts. It premiered on 14 June 1959 at the Deutsche Oper am Rhein in Düsseldorf, conducted by Reinhard Peters, and was published by Boosey & Hawkes. The opera was revived in 2006 at the Landestheater Detmold on the occasion of the composer's 80th birthday.

== History ==
Giselher Klebe focused on literary opera, writing his own librettos based on classical literature. His first opera, premiered in 1959 was Die Räuber, after the play by Friedrich Schiller. Klebe based Die tödlichen Wünsche on Honoré de Balzac's La Peau de chagrin. He structured it in fifteen lyrical scenes in three acts.

The opera premiered on 14 June 1959 at the Deutsche Oper am Rhein in Düsseldorf, conducted by Reinhard Peters. The leading roles were performed by Walter Beißner (tenor) as Raphael von Valentin, Ingrid Paller (soprano) as Pauline, and Kurt Gester (baritone) in five roles intended to be performed by one singer, Der Groupier, Der Alte, Der Besitzer des Kuriositätenladens, Der Notar Cardot and Jonathan, Raphaels Diener. The performance was part of the Woche "Musiktheater des 20. Jahrhunderts" (week of music theatre of the 20th century), and was staged by Günter Roth. Klebe dedicated the opera to my beloved wife Lore. It was published by Boosey & Hawkes.

The opera was revived in 2006 at the Landestheater Detmold, where the composer then lived and taught at the Musikhochschule and was an honorary citizen. On the occasion of his 80th birthday, the Landestheater Detmold staged the work, directed by Kristina Wuss and conducted by Erich Wächter. The premiere on 23 February 2006 was accompanied by an exposition of his autographs kept by the Lippische Landesbibliothek.
