= Aileen Schneider =

German stage director

- Born: 1993 (age 31–32); Rhineland-Palatinate, Germany
- Occupations: Stage director; Opera director
- Website: www.aileenschneider.de

Aileen Schneider (born 1993) is a German director of drama and of opera. She directed Aribert Reimann's Melusine at the Oper Frankfurt in 2025. She is also a poetry slammer, winning in the state of Hesse in 2022.

== Career ==
Schneider was born in Rhineland-Palatinate in 1993. She received early lessons in piano, saxophone and voice. She achieved prizes at Jugend musiziert in 2001 and 2003. She was a member of a three-year composition course of the Yamaha Music Foundation from 2001. In 2011 she achieved a prize at the national competition in composition of Jeunesses musicales. She worked as voluntary assistant of drama directors at the Pfalztheater in Kaiserslautern and then studied direction of music theatre at the Hochschule für Musik und Theater Hamburg from 2012, graduating in 2016 with a staging of Ullmann's Der Kaiser von Atlantis.

During her studies, she directed at the Opera Stabile of the Hamburg State Opera The Sound of a Voice by Philip Glass. She took master classes with Willy Decker and Achim Freyer and took part at the international festival campus of the Ruhrtriennale.

She had a scholarship of the Richard Wagner Stiftung Bayreuth from 2017. She worked as assistant director for music theatre at the Staatstheater Augsburg from 2017. With the 2020/21 season, she moved to the Oper Frankfurt. She directed there Aribert Reimann's Melusine at the Oper Frankfurt in 2025, creating a central round stage at the Bockenheimer Depot.

Schneider is also a poetry slammer, winning in the state of Hesse in 2022.
