= Reinhard Peters =

German conductor (1926–2008)

- Born: 2 April 1926; Magdeburg, Germany
- Died: 4 June 2008 (aged 82); Berlin
- Occupation: Operatic conductor
- Organizations: Deutsche Oper am Rhein; Theater Münster; Deutsche Oper Berlin; Folkwangschule Essen
- Awards: International Besançon Competition for Young Conductors; Deutscher Kritikerpreis

Reinhard Peters (2 April 1926 – 4 June 2008) was a German operatic conductor, violinist and an academic teacher at the Folkwangschule Essen. He was the Generalmusikdirektor for the opera companies Deutsche Oper am Rhein, Theater Münster and Deutsche Oper Berlin. He premiered music in opera and concert, such as Giselher Klebe's Die tödlichen Wünsche, Aribert Reimann's Melusine, Nicolas Nabokov's Love's Labour's Lost, and Wilhelm Killmayer's song cycle Tre Canti di Leopardi.

== Career ==
Born in Magdeburg, Peters worked as répétiteur and violinist at the Staatsoper Unter den Linden. He studied conducting in Paris. In 1951, he was the first recipient of the prize of the Besançon Concorso Internazionale per Giovani Direttori. He was from 1957 to 1961 conductor at the Deutsche Oper am Rhein, where he led the premiere of Giselher Klebe's Die tödlichen Wünsche in Düsseldorf.

From 1961, Peters was Generalmusikdirektor (GMD) of the Sinfonieorchester Münster at the Theater Münster. In 1970, he moved to the Deutsche Oper Berlin. He conducted with the Berlin company the premiere of Aribert Reimann's Melusine at the Schwetzingen Festival on 29 April 1971, staged by Rudolf Sellner. Peters conducted the Philharmonia Hungarica in Marl from 1974 to 1979, and was a professor at the Folkwangschule Essen. Among his students are Stefan Blunier, and Jörg Iwer.

He worked as a guest conductor, including the Berlin Philharmonic. He conducted the premiere of The Scarf, a chamber opera in one act by Lee Hoiby at the first Festival dei Due Mondi in Spoleto, Italy, on 20 June 1958. In 1967 he conducted the premiere of Wilhelm Killmayer's Tre Canti di Leopardi for baritone and orchestra at the Allgemeines Deutsches Musikfest München, with Barry McDaniel and the Münchner Philharmoniker. In 1973 he conducted the first performances of Nicolas Nabokov's Love's Labour's Lost both at La Monnaie in Brussels and the Deutsche Oper Berlin. He died in 2008 in Berlin.

== Awards ==
- 1951: Prize at Besançon Concorso Internazionale per Giovani Direttori in Besançon
- 1959: Förderpreis des Landes Nordrhein-Westfalen für junge Künstlerinnen und Künstler
- 1964: Deutscher Kritikerpreis

== Discography ==
Peters conducted several orchestras in recordings, including the orchestra of the Deutsche Oper Berlin, the Philharmonia Hungarica, the Berlin Philharmonic, the Radio-Symphonie-Orchester Berlin, the Munich Philharmonic and the Collegium Aureum. He conducted works by Adolphe Adam, Johann Sebastian Bach, George Frideric Handel, Ruggero Leoncavallo Gioachino Rossini and Camille Saint-Saëns. He also accompanied singers such as Dietrich Fischer-Dieskau, Ernst Haefliger and Rita Streich, including:

- Ernst Haefliger. Das Sängerporträt, Deutsche Grammophon, Hamburg 1980.
- Klavierkonzert op. 22 by Heimo Erbse, Edel, Hamburg 1993.
- Dietrich Fischer-Dieskau. Szenen und Arien, PolyGram, Hamburg 1993.
- O luce di quest’anima. Rita Streich singt Opernarien, PolyGram, Hamburg 1996.

Several of his recordings were chosen for the CD compilation of Musik in Deutschland 1950–2000, including Jürg Baur's Concerto romano for oboe and orchestra (1960), played in 1963 by Manfred Zeh and the NDR-Sinfonieorchester, in the section Konzerte 1960–1970.
