= Nicolas Nabokov =

Russian-American composer

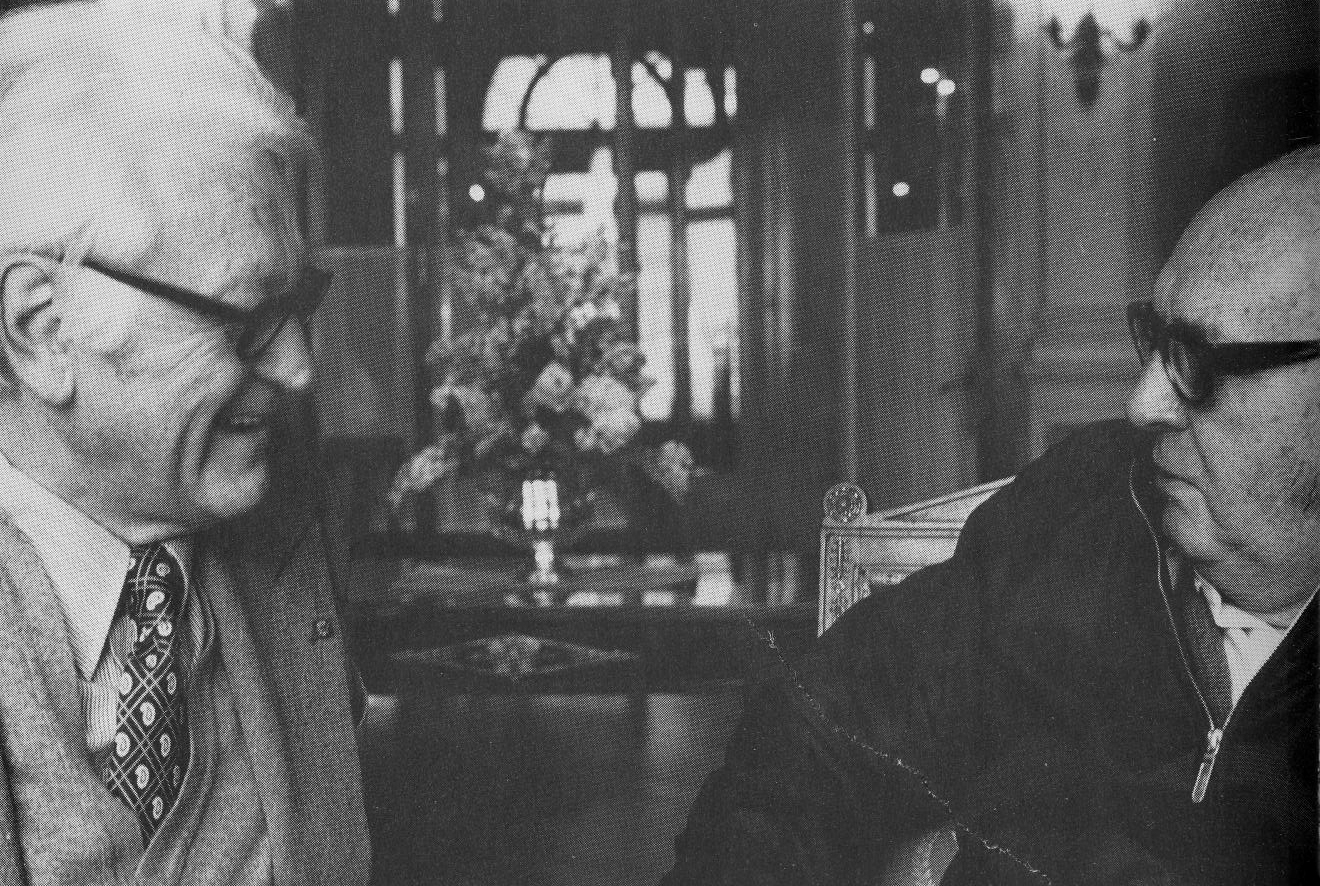
Nicolas Nabokov (left) with his cousin, the writer Vladimir Nabokov (c. 1970s)

Nicolas Nabokov (Николай Дмитриевич Набоков; 17 April [O.S. 4 April] 1903 – 6 April 1978) was a Russian-born composer, writer, and cultural figure. He became a U.S. citizen in 1939.

== Life ==
Nicolas Nabokov, a first cousin of Vladimir Nabokov, and of the baron Eduard von Falz-Fein, was born to a family of landed Russian gentry in the town of Lubcza near Minsk, and was educated by private tutors. In 1918, after his family fled the Bolshevik Revolution to the Crimea, he began his musical education with Vladimir Rebikov. After living briefly in Germany he settled in Paris in 1923, where he studied at the Sorbonne.

Nabokov was married five times. His first wife was the Russian princess Nathalie Shakhovskaya (1903–1988). His last (1970–1978) was the French photographer Dominique Nabokov.

He had three sons: French publisher Ivan Nabokov, Alexander Nabokov, and anthropologist Peter Nabokov. His close friends included the philosopher and fellow émigré Isaiah Berlin and composer Igor Stravinsky.

== Career ==
After living in Paris from 1923 to 1932, in 1933 he moved to the U.S. as a lecturer in music for the Barnes Foundation. He taught music at Wells College in New York from 1936 to 1941, then moved to St. John's College in Maryland. In 1945, he worked for the U. S. Strategic Bombing Survey in Germany, on the suggestion of W. H. Auden, and stayed to work as a civilian cultural advisor in occupied Germany. Back in the US, he taught at the Peabody Conservatory from the fall of 1944 until the spring of 1945, then, in 1950–1951, served as music director at the American Academy in Rome. His students included composers Dominick Argento and Rosette Renshaw.

In 1949, Nabokov attended a New York press conference of the visiting Soviet composer Dmitri Shostakovich and publicly humiliated him by showing he was not a free agent and had to represent the positions of Stalin's government, by asking him if he approved the Soviet censorship over Stravinsky's music, to which Shostakovich had no option but to reply that he did. In 1951, Nabokov became secretary general of the newly formed Congress for Cultural Freedom (CCF), backed by the CIA, and remained in the job for more than fifteen years, organizing music and cultural festivals. With the effective dissolution of the CCF in 1967, Nabokov found a series of teaching jobs at American universities, and in 1970, became resident composer at the Aspen Institute for Humanistic Studies, where he remained until 1973.

== Works ==
- Nabokov's first major musical work was the ballet-oratorio Ode, for Sergei Diaghilev's Ballets Russes, in 1928, followed by his Lyrical Symphony in 1931. The ode was on verses of Mikhail Lomonosov "Вечернее размышление о Божием величестве", ballet-oratorio Paris 1928.
- Ballet Union Pacific, composed in 1934 for Ballet Russe de Monte-Carlo, choreography by Léonide Massine, libretto by Archibald MacLeish, premiered in Philadelphia and later in New York with a great success – his best known work in the US.
- Opera Rasputin's End (libretto by Stephen Spender) in 1958.
- Ballet on Don Quixote in 1966.
- Opera Love's Labour's Lost (libretto by W. H. Auden and Chester Kallman) was composed in 1971 and performed in 1973.
