= Pfalztheater =

Theatre in Kaiserslautern, Germany

Coordinates: 49.4468°N 07.7692°E

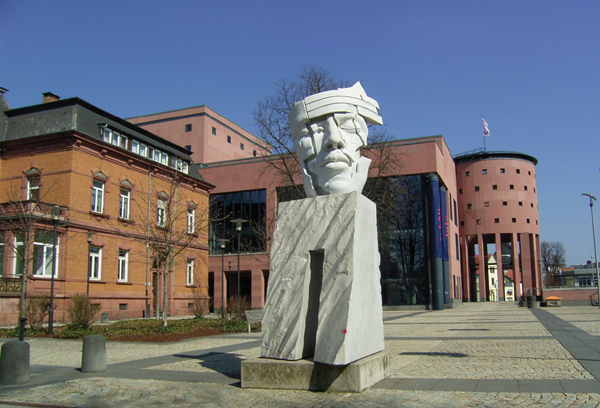
The current Pfalztheater

The Pfalztheater is a theatre building and company in the German city of Kaiserslautern, Rhineland-Palatine. It is the only three-genre venue in the state, putting on music, drama and dance.

The town's first theatre was built in 1862, financed by Andreas Müller, owner of the Spittelmühle in Kaiserslautern. It stood on Theaterstraße (now Karl-Marx-Straße) on the corner of Gasstraße. It was destroyed by fire a few years later and rebuilt by Müller. In 1874, the theatre was converted into a public limited company. The shares were taken over in 1897 by the town of Kaiserslautern, as a municipal theatre. It grew to the Städtebundoper during the first decades of the 20th century, in a cooperation with other theatres in the state, especially with Pirmasens and Zweibrücken. Productions continued there until the building was completely destroyed by bombing on 14 August 1944. Performances resumed in October 1945 at the Capitol cinema. When funding had been raised, the Film-Palast cinema was converted into a permanent replacement for the lost theatre, opening in September 1950.
