= Claus H. Henneberg =

German librettist and translator

- Born: 4 February 1936
- Died: 22 February 1998 (aged 62)
- Occupations: Librettist; Dramaturge; Intendant
- Organizations: Cologne Opera; Deutsche Oper Berlin; Opernhaus Kiel

Claus H. Henneberg (4 February 1936 – 22 February 1998) was a German librettist and translator. He worked as dramaturge for the Cologne Opera and the Deutsche Oper Berlin. In the 1976/77 season, he was the Intendant of the Opernhaus Kiel.

== Librettos ==
- Melusine, opera in four acts (1970) after the play of the same name (1920/30, premiered in 1956) by Yvan Goll), music: Aribert Reimann, premiere 29 April 1971 Schlosstheater Schwetzingen (Schwetzingen Festival)
- Kinkaku-ji (The golden Pavillon), opera in three acts (1976), after the novel 金閣寺 (The Temple of the Golden Pavilion, 1956) by Yukio Mishima), music: Toshiro Mayuzumi, premiered 23 June 1976 Deutsche Oper Berlin
- Fettklößchen, opera buffa after the novella Boule de suif (1880) by Guy de Maupassant), music: Karl Heinz Wahren, premiered 1976 Deutsche Oper Berlin
- Lear, opera in two parts (1976–78) after Shakespeare's King Lear (premiered 1606), translated by Johann Joachim Eschenburg (1777), music: Reimann, premiered 9 July 1978 Bavarian State Opera, conducted by Gerd Albrecht, staged by Jean-Pierre Ponnelle, costumes by Pet Halmen, with Dietrich Fischer-Dieskau in the title role
- Enrico, dramatic comedy in nine scenes (1989–91) after Enrico IV (premiered 1922) by Luigi Pirandello, music: Manfred Trojahn, premiered 10 April 1991 Schwetzingen Festival, conducted by Dennis Russell Davies, staged by Peter Mussbach
- Drei Schwestern, opera in three sequences (1996/97; after the play of the same name (1900, premiered 1901] by Anton Chekhov, music: Péter Eötvös, premiered 13 March 1998 Lyon Opera, conducted by Kent Nagano and the composer
- Was ihr wollt, opera in four acts (1997/98), after Shakespeare's Twelfth Night, or What You Will (c. 1600), music: Trojahn, premiered 24 May 1998 Bavarian State Opera. conducted by Michael Boder, staged by Mussbach
- Thomas Chatterton, opera in two parts (1994–98) after the play of the same name (1955, premiered 1956) by Hans Henny Jahnn, music: Matthias Pintscher, premiered 25 May 1998 Semperoper, conducted by Marc Albrecht, staged by Marco Arturo Marelli
- Die Sündflut, music theatre (with Michael Hampe after the play of the same name (premiered 1924) by Ernst Barlach, music: Wilfried Maria Danner, premiered 13 April 2002 Badisches Staatstheater Karlsruhe, staged by Hampe, conducted by Kazushi Ōno
- Pascha, chamber opera in one act, also known as Corps de Ballet (1996) after the story The Chorus Girl by Chekhov, music: Oliver Gruhn.

== Publications ==
- Hans Magnus Enzensberger; Hans Werner Henze (1971). Claus H. Henneberg (ed.). El Cimarrón. Ein Werkbericht. Mainz: Schott Music. ISBN 978-3-7957-2210-4. ED 6397.
- Alexander Borodin. Marek Bobéth; Claus H. Henneberg (eds.). Prince Igor. Mainz: Schott Music. LBEL 1012-01.
