= Rudolf Sellner =

German actor (1905–1990)

- Born: Gustav Rudolf Sellner; 25 May 1905; Traunstein
- Died: 8 May 1990 (aged 84); Burgberg, Baden-Württemberg, Germany
- Occupations: Actor; Dramaturge; Stage director; Intendant
- Organizations: Landestheater Darmstadt; Deutsche Oper Berlin
- Awards: Berliner Kunstpreis; Goethe-Plakette des Landes Hessen; Ordre des Arts et des Lettres; Federal Cross of Merit; Deutscher Filmpreis

Rudolf Sellner, born Gustav Rudolf Sellner (25 May 1905 – 8 May 1990) was a German actor, dramaturge, stage director, and intendant. He represented in the 1950s a radical Instrumentales Theater (instrumental theatre). After decades of acting and directing plays, he turned to staging operas, and was a long-time intendant of the Deutsche Oper Berlin from 1961, when the Berlin Wall was built. He staged notable world premieres, including Ernst Barlach's play Der Graf von Ratzeburg in 1951, Ionesco's Mörder ohne Bezahlung in 1958, Giselher Klebe's Alkmene in 1961 for the opening of the Deutsche Oper, and Aribert Reimann's opera Melusine in 1971.

== Career ==
Born Gustav Rudolf Sellner in Traunstein, he began his career as an actor, dramaturge and stage director at theatres in Mannheim under Francesco Sioli from 1925, in Gotha from 1928, and in Coburg from 1929 to 1931. He was influenced by the work of Otto Falckenberg, Leopold Jessner and Erwin Piscator. He was an Oberspielleiter, dramaturge and actor at the Landestheater Oldenburg from 1932 to 1937 when he was promoted to Schauspieldirektor (director of plays) there. Sellner joined the Nazi Party in 1933. He was Intendant of the Stadttheater Göttingen from 1940 to 1943.

Sellner was Intendant of the Städtische Bühnen Hannover from 1943. He also directed the Theaterschule Hannover, a school of acting as part of the Landesmusikschule Hannover. In 1944 he was appointed Generalintendant of the Städtische Bühnen. In October 1944, he was drafted into the Wehrmacht. After World War II, he was a prisoner of war and was interned until 1947 in two U.S. prisoner camps. In the process of denazification in 1949, he was ranked as a Mitläufer, revised in 1950 to "entlastet". From 1948 to 1951, he worked as a stage director in Kiel, Essen and Hamburg. He staged in Kiel in 1948 The Persians by Aeschylus, and in 1950 Lorca's Bernarda Albas Haus.

From 1951 to 1961, Sellner was Intendant of the Landestheater Darmstadt. He staged the premiere of Ernst Barlach's Der Graf von Ratzeburg in 1951. Sellner also had a small theater school in Darmstadt. When the state ceased subsidies in 1954 in the face of a lack of placement success among the graduates, the theater school had to be dissolved. In 1954, Sellner staged Shakespeare's Troilus und Cressida at the Staatliche Schauspielbühne Berlin, and his Der Sturm at the 1959 Ruhrfestspiele. In Darmstadt, he directed the premiere of Ionesco's Mörder ohne Bezahlung in 1958. He worked as a regular guest at the Burgtheater, staging a cycle of plays by Sophocles, Oedipus Rex in 1960, Antigone in 1961, and Elektra in 1963.

Sellner had a reputation for being a representative of classical theatre. In 1959, he was invited by Carl Ebert to stage Schoenberg's opera Moses und Aron at the Städtische Oper Berlin. He became Generalintendant (General manager) of the opera company, now called Deutsche Oper Berlin, in 1961. It was during the Cold War, and he was expected to showcase culture in West Berlin in a new opera house. A few weeks before the opening, the Berlin Wall was built, making the ambitious opening performances even more of a logistical challenge. The new opera house was inaugurated in 1961 with a performance of Mozart's Don Giovanni, staged by Ebert and conducted by Ferenc Fricsay, with singers such as Elisabeth Grümmer, Pilar Lorengar, Erika Köth, Dietrich Fischer-Dieskau, Donald Grobe, Josef Greindl and Walter Berry. The following day, Giselher Klebe's Alkmene received its world premiere, staged by Sellner and conducted by Heinrich Hollreiser. The third day, Verdi's Aida was shown in a production by Wieland Wagner. Sellner held the post at the Deutsche Oper Berlin until 1972. He staged Mussorgsky's Boris Godunow in 1971 in Berlin, the premiere of Aribert Reimann's Melusine the same year at the Schwetzingen Festival, Alban Berg's Wozzeck also the same year at the Salzburg Festival, Mozart's Idomeneo at the Salzburg Festival in 1973, Gottfried von Einem's Der Besuch der alten Dame at the Nationaltheater München in 1975, and Thomas Bernhard's Die Jagdgesellschaft at the Theater Basel in 1974, among others. Occasionally, Sellner also worked for television and film. In Maximilian Schell's production Der Fußgänger, Sellner played the title role while Schell personified his deceased son.

Sellner was married from 1940 to the actress Manuela Bruhn and from 1951 to Ilse Sellner. The first marriage produced two children. He died in Burgberg, part of Königsfeld im Schwarzwald.

== Publications ==
- Gustav Rudolf Sellner: Neue deutsche Dramatik. Coburg 1929.
- Gustav Rudolf Sellner, Werner Wien: Theatralische Landschaft. Bremen 1962.

== Films ==
Sellner directed several operas for television, and appeared as an actor in films:

- 1955 Orff: Die Kluge (TV opera, director)
- 1958 Orff: Die Bernauerin (TV opera, director)
- 1957: Abu Kasems Pantoffeln (TV Movie, director) – Erzähler
- 1961 Ionesco: Die Nashörner (TV, director)
- 1965 Claudel: Der seidene Schuh (TV series, director)
- 1968 Henze: Der junge Lord (TV opera, director)
- 1973: Der Fußgänger – Heinz Alfred Giese
- 1975: Ansichten eines Clowns – The Father
- 1979: David – Dr. Grell
- 1979: Phantasten (TV Movie) – Dr. Plesse
- 1980: Ein Mann von gestern (TV Movie) – Knoop (final film role)

== Awards ==
Sellner received several awards, including;

- 1967: Berliner Kunstpreis
- 1965: Goethe-Plakette des Landes Hessen
- 1965: Ordre des Arts et des Lettres
- 1972: Großes Bundesverdienstkreuz mit Stern
- 1974: Filmband in Gold for Der Fußgänger

== Exhibition ==
1996: Gustav Rudolf Sellner. Regisseur und Intendant, Theatermuseum Düsseldorf, by the Theaterwissenschaftliche Sammlung (Collection of theatre science) of the University of Cologne

== Literature ==
- Hugo Thielen: Sellner, Gustav Rudolf, in: Hannoversches Biographisches Lexikon, p. 332
- Deutsche Biographische Enzyklopädie, vol. 9, p. 280
- Deutsches Theater-Lexikon, vol. 3, p. 2172f.
- Elmar Buck, Joachim Geil, Gerald Köhler (ed.): Gustav Rudolf Sellner, Regisseur und Intendant, 1905–1990: Eine Ausstellung der Theaterwissenschaftlichen Sammlung der Universität zu Köln. Cologne 1996.
- Gerald Köhler: Das Instrumentale Theater des Gustav Rudolf Sellner. Cologne 2002.
- Ralph-Günther Patocka (2010). "Sellner, Gustav Rudolf". Neue Deutsche Biographie (in German). Vol. 24. Berlin: Duncker & Humblot. pp. 224–225. (full text online).
