= Small Moral Works =

Work by Giacomo Leopardi

Operette morali
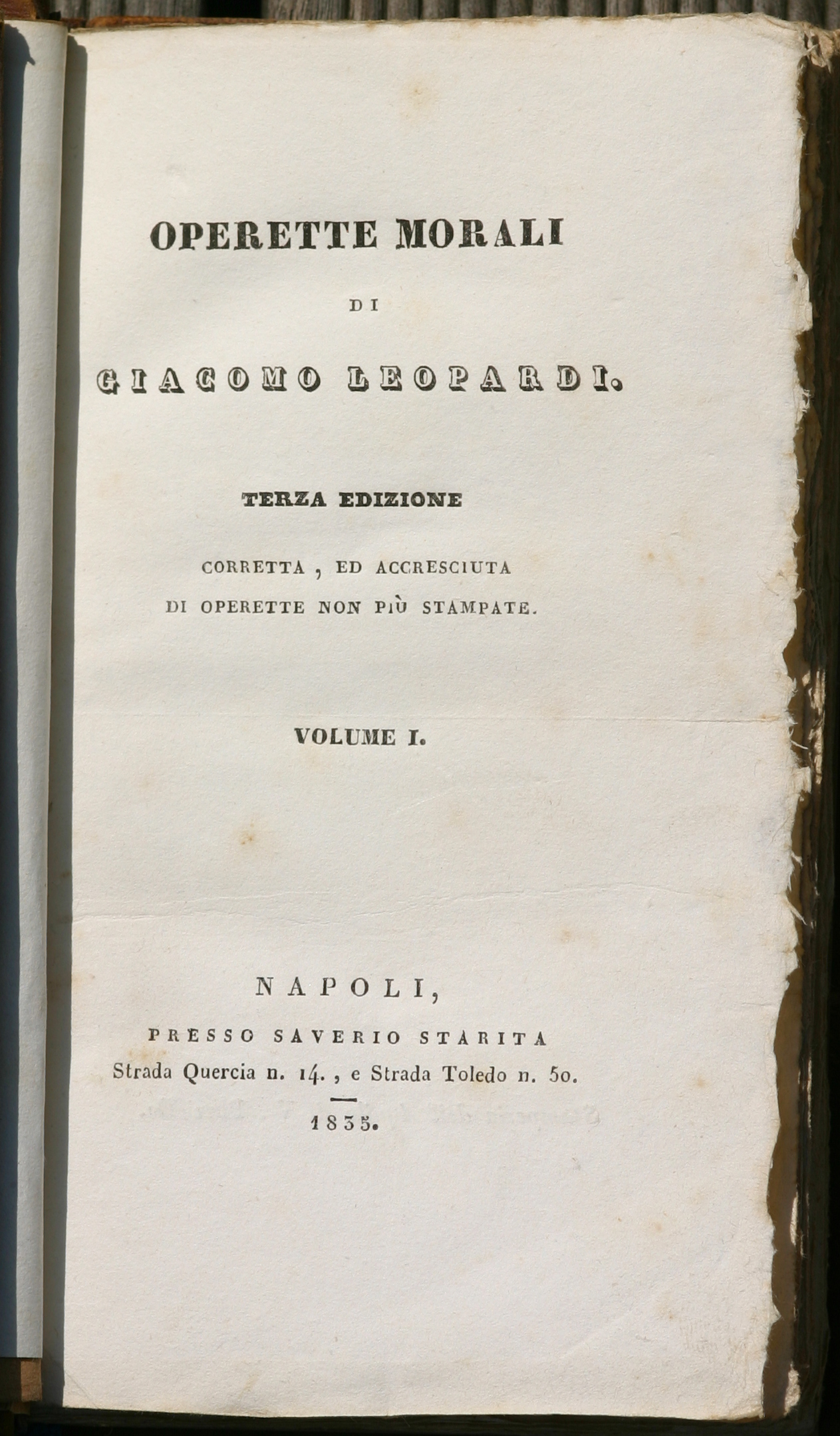
- Title page of the Starita edition (Naples, 1835)
- Author: Giacomo Leopardi
- Language: Italian
- Subject: Philosophical
- Genre: Dialogues and novellas
- Published: 1827

The Operette morali (Italian: Operette morali [opeˈrette moˈraːli]) is a collection of twenty-four prose works, comprising dialogues and novellas, written in a middle style with irony, composed by the poet and writer Giacomo Leopardi between 1824 and 1832.

The work was published in a definitive edition in Naples in 1835, following two intermediate editions in 1827 and 1834. Antonio Ranieri, a longtime friend of Leopardi's, had it published in the original text in 1845. Unlike the Canti, the Operette morali were conceived during a single year, 1824, although the various editions demonstrate the addition of subsequent dialogues and adjustments to the final message.

The Operette morali represent the literary culmination of nearly the entirety of the material contained in the Zibaldone. The themes are those characteristic of the poet: the relationship between humanity and history, with its peers, and particularly with Nature, of which Leopardi develops a personal philosophical vision; the contrast between the values of the past and the static and degenerate condition of the present; the power of illusions, glory, and tedium. These themes are reconsidered in light of a radical change that occurred in the writer's outlook: reason is no longer merely an obstacle to happiness, but the only human instrument capable of escaping despair.

The Operette morali were frequently confused with a similar project by the author's father, Monaldo Leopardi, which achieved considerable success. As a result, Giacomo was often erroneously cited as the author of his father's work.

== Background ==
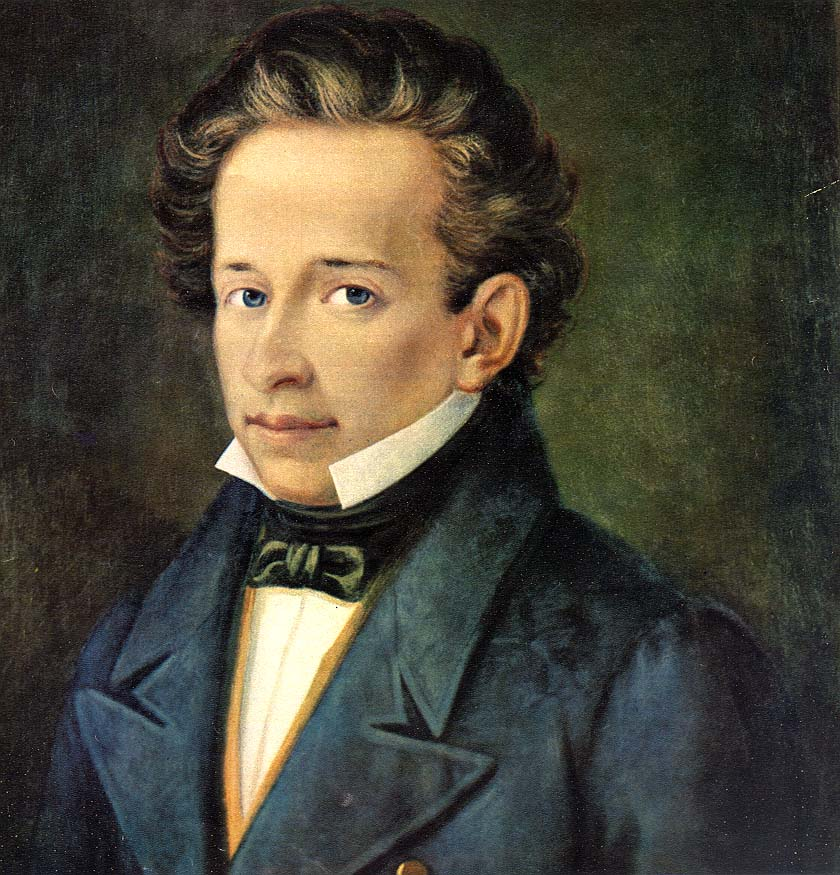
Portrait by S. Ferrazzi, c. 1820

The works reflect the conviction that reason, far from being the cause of man's unhappiness, is the only means by which man can avoid despair. Leopardi reached this final point of his reflection about the human condition in the years 1822–1824, and in 1824 he conceived the "Operette morali", which collected and elaborated in a dramatic and ironic expression of the philosophical research developed in the Zibaldone. In this period, Leopardi, believing that his lyrical voice had vanished, devoted himself to philosophical prose. The first idea of this work can be traced in the plan of some "prosette satiriche" (satirical prose), "alla maniera di Luciano" (following the style of Lucian). In Italian literature, nothing similar to the Operette can be found. Leopardi imitates Lucian's comical style with wit and humor, and moves through different levels of language. He even mixes various genres and themes.

Apart from Lucian, the most significant models in literary style come from the Enlightenment. Leopardi appreciates Fontenelle for his "leggerezza" (lightness), while in Dialogo della Natura e di un Islandese, one can perceive some of Voltaire's cynicism. Among the Italians, Leopardi admired Ariosto, whose "comical style" he imitated in Dialogo della Terra e della Luna. The extensive knowledge of a great number of works, both philosophical and scientific, is the basis for the humorous and frivolous erudition that Leopardi ironically flaunted. A philological research about the sources that Leopardi cites or merely re-uses in the Operette, in a constant intertextual dialogue, is still lacking.

== Origin of the work ==
=== Satirical prosettes ===
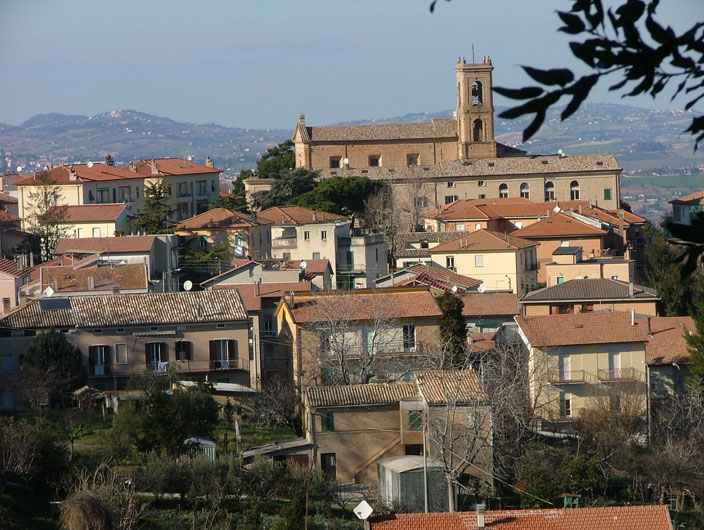
Recanati, the birthplace where the greater part of Giacomo Leopardi's thought and works originated.

As early as 1820, Leopardi had considered the idea of writing satirical prosettes. However, only in 1824 that the project matured and encompassed a broader range of subjects and experiences.

At this time he moved to Rome, an attempt to leave Recanati, the "tomb of the living", in search of happiness; he seemed to go through a poetic crisis (the drying up of the lyrical vein of his early youth); and a philosophical crisis (the transition from historical-progressive materialism to cosmic materialism).

In a passage from the "Literary Designs", reconstructed from autograph papers in Recanati, Leopardi reveals his intention to write:

Satirical dialogues in the manner of Lucian, but removing the characters and the ridiculous elements from present and modern customs, and not so much among the dead [...], but rather among characters who are pretended to be alive, and even, if desired, among animals [...]; in short, short comedies, or scenes from comedies [...]: these could serve to provide Italy with a sample of its true comic language, which it is absolutely necessary to create [...]. And these dialogues would in some way supply everything that is lacking in Italian comedy, since it is not deficient in plot, invention, structure, etc., and in all those aspects it performs well; but it is entirely lacking in the particular, that is, the style and the partial beauties of fine satire, Attic wit, and truly Plautine and Lucianic ridicule.

— Giacomo Leopardi, Literary Designs, Recanati, 1819—in Various and Unpublished Writings edited by O. Besomi

Besomi is credited with reconstructing, as faithfully as possible, the dates of composition of these initial sketches. The influence of the disappointment following the Neapolitan revolts of 1820–1821 was not extraneous; these events caused the political tone of these early attempts to disappear.

Blasucci and Secchieri consider the period of the satirical prosettes to be distinct from the Operette morali proper.

=== The first nucleus ===
Although their dating is uncertain, the following prose experiments can be assigned to the period 1820–1821:

- Dialogue: ...Greek philosopher, Murcus the Roman senator, the Roman people, conspirators
- Dialogue between two beasts, e.g., a horse and a bull
- Dialogue of a horse and an ox and related additions
- Dialogue: Gentleman and World
- First fragment of Novella: Xenophon and Niccolò Machiavelli

These early dialogues exhibit certain characteristic features of the Lucianic style (conversation in the underworld, forms of low as well as high comedy) that are also found in the Operette morali proper.

The main theme of this nucleus is the "penitence of virtue", that is, the choice of a moral writing that can no longer teach those "magnanimous errors" that "embellish our life". These errors are virtue and glory. The new writing renounces poetry (lyric) and the persuasion of enthusiasm; it consists, very practically, in abstaining from political and philanthropic commitment. Only irony and play for its own sake remain: Xenophon and Machiavelli, the Cyropaedia and The Prince, are placed in comparison.

The dialogues and novellas are continuously interwoven and varied, making it difficult, if not impossible, to construct a unified overview. Situations, characters, places, and times continually change; "there emerges a bizarre world of popular and childlike taste, full of grace and genial vanity". The pleasure of variation and discontinuity is clearly evident: the reader is provoked and stimulated; the conclusion of the work is left to their responsibility. This aspect finds its fullest realization in the Dialogue of Plotinus and Porphyry.

The sketches from 1820–1821 contain critical themes directed against absolutism and anthropocentrism. The strong political tone, which later disappears and is taken up only in the final operette, provides such profound material for reflection that it leads to a change in the author's psychological, philosophical-moral, and literary attitude, resulting in a reconsideration of the very form of expression, the transition from poetry to prose.

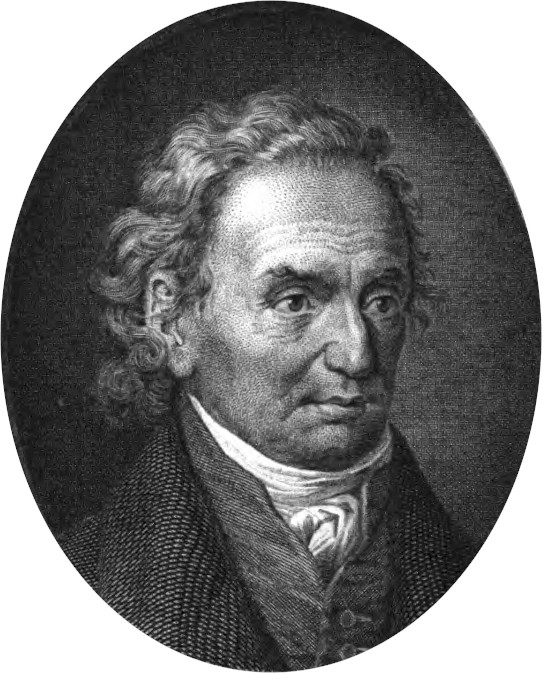
Pietro Giordani.

Between 1822 and 1823, the poet transcribed in a page of the Zibaldone, designated as "literary projects", an approximate index of 17 operette. Many dialogues and novellas are already present, albeit with provisional titles:

1. Leap from Leucadia
2. Hegesias of Piraeus
3. Timon and Socrates
4. Nature and soul
5. Prince of the new Cynosarges
6. Second youth
7. Misenor and Philenor
8. Beppo
9. Tiresias
10. Cunning and Force
11. Tasso and Genius
12. Gentleman and World
13. The muleteer and the mule, or the Aponosian
14. The two mice
15. Hippocrates and Democritus
16. The nightingale and the rose
17. The sun and the first hour, or Copernicus

=== The definitive edition ===
The definitive version of the Operette morali follows this order:

- History of the human race, 19 January / 7 February 1824
- Dialogue of Hercules and Atlas, 10 / 13 February 1824
- Dialogue of Fashion and Death, 15 / 18 February 1824
- Proposal of prizes made by the Academy of the Graphomaniacs, 22 / 25 February 1824
- Dialogue of a Goblin and a Gnome, 2 / 6 March 1824
- Dialogue of Malambruno and Farfarello, 1 / 3 April 1824
- Dialogue of Nature and of a Soul, 9 / 14 April 1824
- Dialogue of the Earth and of the Moon, 24 / 28 April 1824
- The Wager of Prometheus, 30 April / 8 May 1824
- Dialogue of a Physicist and a Metaphysician, 14 / 19 May 1824
- Dialogue of Nature and of an Icelander, 21 / 30 May 1824
- Dialogue of Torquato Tasso and of his Familiar Genius, 1 / 10 June 1824
- Dialogue of Timander and Eleander, 14 / 24 June 1824
- Parini, or On Glory, 6 July / 30 August 1824
- Dialogue of Frederick Ruysch and of his Mummies, 16 / 23 August 1824
- Memorable Sayings of Filippo Ottonieri, 29 August / 26 September 1824
- Dialogue of Christopher Columbus and of Pedro Gutierrez, 19 October / 5 November 1824
- Encomium of Birds, 29 October / 5 November 1824
- Song of the Wild Rooster, 10 / 16 November 1824
- Apocryphal Fragment of Strato of Lampsacus, autumn 1825
- Copernicus, 1827
- Dialogue of Plotinus and Porphyry, 1827
- Dialogue of an Almanac Seller and of a Passerby, 1832
- Dialogue of Tristan and of a Friend, 1832

== Editorial history ==
=== 1824 index ===
In 1888, during the transfer of papers from Antonio Ranieri to the National Library of Naples, an autograph manuscript containing an index for the twenty operette composed up to that point came to light. This index differs from both the first printed edition and all subsequent known printed editions.

The autograph is a fair copy carefully prepared with wide margins to accommodate notes and annotations, primarily of a grammatical and stylistic nature. Based on the different colors of ink used, it has been possible to distinguish three phases of correction prior to May 1826. Unlike the Canti, the Operette morali did not undergo substantial changes.

In this first version, which was never committed to print, it is noteworthy that the work concludes with the Song of the Wild Rooster, which echoes the opening novella, the History of the Human Race. Leopardi entrusts an eschatological message to a supernatural being, thereby emphasizing the more philosophical aspects of his thought. This concluding image disappears in subsequent editions, only to be partially recovered later in the pairing of the Song with the Apocryphal Fragment of Strato of Lampsacus, which is preceded by a brief footnote in the 1835 edition.

=== 1827 edition ===
Known as the first official edition of the Operette morali, it was published in Milan by Antonio Fortunato Stella, a capable publisher who succeeded in negotiating with the strict censors of the time. Stella, along with Pietro Giordani and Montani, was among the few figures who understood the spirit of the work, even though Italy was unaccustomed to this type of writing. Between 1825 and 1827, Leopardi composed three new prose works, which, however, do not appear in this edition.

From the extensive correspondence of this period, which documents the author's corrections, revisions, and comments, emerges the essential unity of the rhetorical register of the Operette, which justifies the absence of an introduction explaining the programmatic design. The decision to place the Dialogue of Timander and Eleander at the conclusion of the collection has been interpreted by critics as a form of apologia for the work against modern philosophers: evidently, the composition of the Apocryphal Fragment, which together with the Song forms the cornerstone of Leopardi's concept that "everything is evil," influenced the change in the work's conclusion. The repositioning of the Dialogue of Nature and an Icelander, inserted between the Dialogue of Torquato Tasso and His Familiar Genius and Parini, or On Glory, is dictated by literary variatio: the author avoids the succession of two operette featuring historical poets and men of letters as protagonists.

=== 1834 edition ===
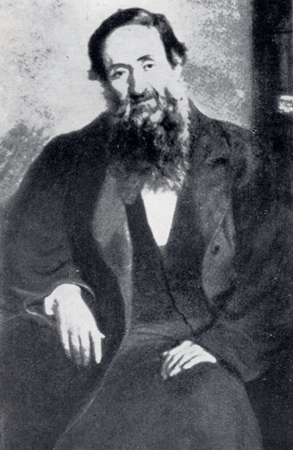
Niccolò Tommaseo

The second edition of the Operette morali was published six years later, in 1834 (the manuscript having been sent between June and July 1833), because the first edition had become virtually unobtainable. During this period, Leopardi was suffering from a persistent eye ailment; due to this problem with his eyesight, it was Antonio Ranieri who physically oversaw the printing, which was carried out by the publisher Guielmo Piatti in Florence, who had previously published the Canti in 1831. Two new operette were published for the first time: in 1832, the poet had composed the Dialogue of an Almanac Seller and a Passerby and the Dialogue of Tristan and a Friend. The latter, placed at the conclusion of the collection, is a polemical text related to the rupture with the Florentine group associated with the journal Antologia.

The new edition serves as a response to the hostile opinions expressed against him and as an opportunity to resume and develop more radically the reflections contained within it. The operette composed between 1825 and 1827 are still absent, although the content of the Apocryphal Fragment makes itself felt in a note appended to the Song of the Wild Rooster, in which the author declares: "This is a poetic conclusion, not a philosophical one." The next step would be to elaborate this conclusion in a more extensive and developed text.

The Dialogue of Porphyry and Copernicus were also omitted at this time, probably more due to the author's indecision than to fear of censorship.

=== 1835 edition ===
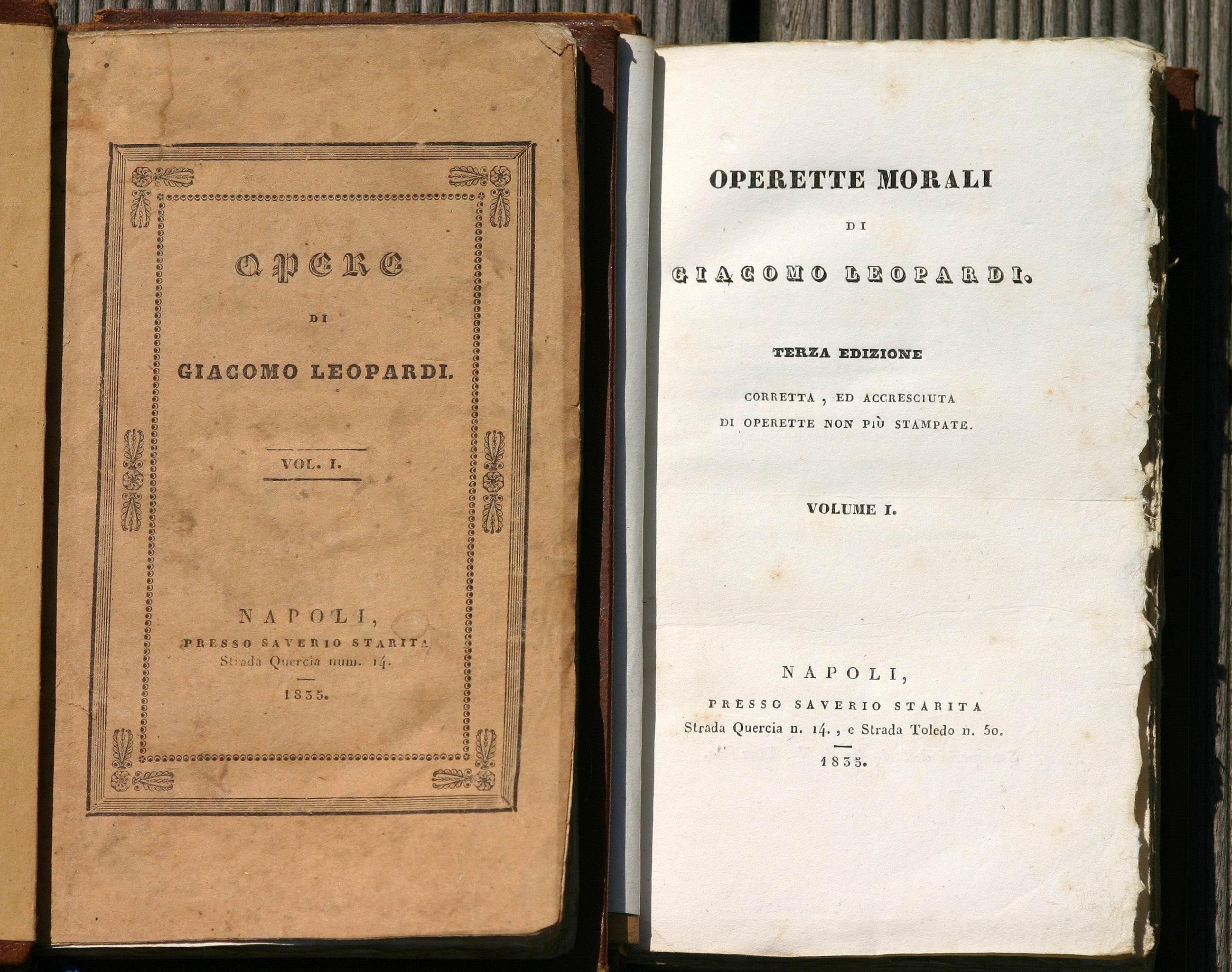
First edition of Leopardi's works published in Naples by Saverio Starita in 1835.

The third edition of the Operette morali, published by Saverio Starita in Naples and described as "corrected and enlarged," was part of a larger project to publish a complete edition of Giacomo Leopardi's poetic and prose works in three volumes: the first for the Canti and the second, divided into two tomes, for the Operette morali. Unfortunately, the publication was halted by censorship, and only the first thirteen operette were actually printed. Leopardi had finally decided to include Copernicus, a Dialogue and the Apocryphal Fragment of Strato of Lampsacus. (Note: This information is found in the preparatory correspondence for a French edition to be published by Baudry, for which Luigi De Sinner was to be responsible; the author's death prevented its realization. The materials prepared for the press were preserved and used, albeit with numerous errors, by Antonio Ranieri for the subsequent Le Monnier edition.)

The edition of my works has been suspended, and more probably abolished, beginning with the second volume, which has still not been permitted to be publicly distributed in Naples, as it has not received the requisite approval. My philosophy has displeased the priests, who, both here and throughout the world, under one name or another, can still and will eternally be able to do everything.

— Giacomo Leopardi, letter to Luigi De Sinner, 22 December 1836.

Despite the suppression, many copies of the first volume were sold through an expedient: the original title page was replaced with the following: Prose by Giacomo Leopardi, Corrected edition, enlarged and the only one approved by the author, Naples, Italy 1835.

=== 1845 edition ===
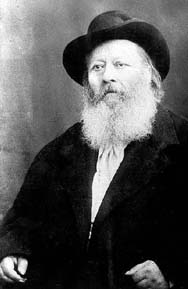
Antonio Ranieri

In 1845, the first posthumous edition was published by the Florentine publisher Le Monnier. This edition was carefully prepared by Antonio Ranieri, who, although introducing numerous errors, based it on the author's autograph manuscript and his preparatory notes for the Starita edition and the planned Parisian edition. Ranieri added some notes to the text, but not always with precision.

The Apocryphal Fragment is placed after the Song of the Wild Rooster. The Copernicus and the Dialogue of Porphyry are inserted between the Dialogue of Timander and Eleander and the operette composed last. The palinode of the Dialogue of Tristan and a Friend is confirmed as the concluding work.

The Dialogue of a Reader of the Humanities and Sallust remained excluded, "by the author's wish," although no document explains the reasons for this decision.

Supporting the validity of this edition, which reflects Leopardi's intentions rather than those of Ranieri, are a copy of the first volume of the Starita edition corrected by the author himself, an edition of the Piatti corrected by the author, and various autographs and drafts.

The printed edition included a warning imposed on several operette by the Florentine censor, Father Amerigo Barsi, intended to protect the reader, in the name of the Catholic system, from the errors contained in the poet's work.

=== Modern critical editions ===
The foundation for the first critical edition was laid by Giovanni Mestica, who focused much of his work on the Neapolitan manuscripts. Despite the premature death of the editor before completing the work, the publisher Le Monnier produced a new edition based on his studies in 1906. This was followed by the edition of Giovanni Gentile, published by Zanichelli in Bologna in 1918, which was based on the last edition overseen by Leopardi, supplemented by the Neapolitan autograph.

The official critical edition was ultimately completed by Francesco Moroncini and published in Bologna in 1929; all subsequent editions have been based on it. Like Ranieri, Moroncini relied on a copy of the first volume of the Starita edition corrected by Leopardi himself and the Piatti edition with handwritten corrections dictated by the poet to Ranieri. For the Copernicus, he used a corrected proof intended for the third volume of the Starita edition of the Opere, which was never published, while for the Dialogue of Porphyry, he used the 1845 edition collated with autograph manuscripts.

=== Preliminary publications in periodicals and newspapers ===
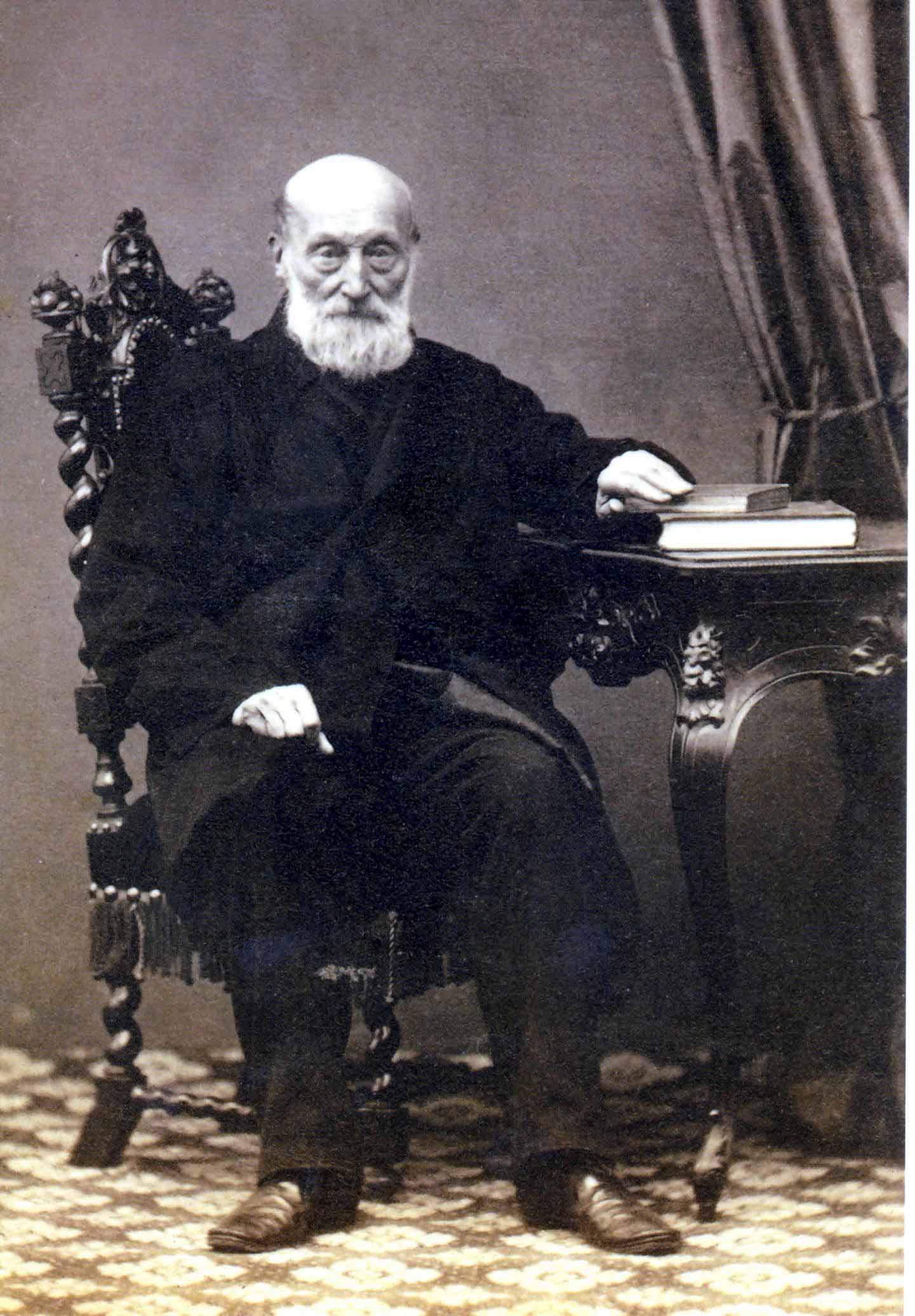
Giovan Pietro Vieusseux

Certain preferred operette were published by Leopardi in periodicals and newspapers prior to their appearance in volume form. However, these authorized preliminary publications were more than once a source of great frustration for him, due to the numerous errors and oversights they contained. In the first edition of the Antologia, which included only three dialogues appearing in issue LXI of January 1826, the final operetta was placed first, thereby distorting the overall meaning of the work.

[...] I thank you for the honor you have done my dialogues by publishing them in your journal, although I realize that I did not succeed in making my wishes clear to Giordani in this regard, and although I have been somewhat humiliated by the many and egregious errors that occurred in the printing (such that I often could not understand myself when reading it) and by the barbarous orthography that prevails therein.

— Letter to Giovan Pietro Vieusseux, 4 March 1826, no. 422.

The second publication, corrected of many errors, appeared in the Nuovo Ricoglitore: the first operetta in the issue of 15 March 1826, and the other two in the issue of 16 April 1826.

Another concern for Leopardi was the fragmented nature of these publications: the opening with the History of the Human Race and the varying conclusions from one edition to another demonstrate a precise and articulated design.

Publishing piecemeal [...] will greatly harm a work that should be judged as a whole and in its systematic entirety, as is the case with every philosophical work, even if written with an appearance of lightness.

— Giacomo Leopardi, letter to Antonio Fortunato Stella, 6 December 1826, no. 494.

It is true that the entire book will eventually be published in a single volume, but the public's first judgment will already have been formed on the basis of those pieces that appeared gradually and very slowly: and the first judgment is the one that always endures.

— Ibid.

The potential for misunderstanding, even on the part of publishers, arises primarily from the absence in the work's structure of any element of systematic organization.

== Summary of the Operette morali according to the 1835 edition ==
- History of the Human Race. Humanity appears on Earth and divides into races. Boredom seizes human existence, as people are incapable of pursuing pleasure and happiness, and end up harming one another and killing each other. Jupiter intervenes by sending plagues and diseases into the world so that humanity will appreciate the value of life, along with the "spirits", that is, ethical and moral values: Virtue, Courage, and Glory. Humanity initially seems to rise from its wretched state, but over the course of history finds a way to invert the nature of these spirits, giving rise to Cruelty, Wickedness, and Hatred. Jupiter decides to offer humanity one last chance by sending Truth and Love: only with the latter can humanity delude itself into believing it is happy.
- Dialogue of Hercules and Atlas. The giant Atlas, compelled by Jupiter to bear the celestial sphere on his shoulders, is asked by Hercules to exchange places for a time. Atlas refuses the hero's assistance, however, explaining that the Earth does not weigh on him so heavily, because the insignificance of humanity makes it lighter.
- Dialogue of Fashion and Death. Fashion and Death meet and discover that they share the same purpose on Earth: to remain constant across the ages, even though Fashion may change according to human desires. However, upon learning from Death that every human being is destined to die, Fashion agrees with her that human life should be made more miserable.
- Proposal of Prizes Made by the Academy of the Graphomaniacs. This prose work satirically condemns the positivist ideal of progress, which offers illusions even more false than those normally believed by humanity. For example, friendship and mutual fidelity are exploited by businessmen for their own lucrative and malevolent purposes.
- Dialogue of a Goblin and a Gnome. A gnome discovers from a goblin that the Earth is uninhabited because humanity has become extinct as a result of the theory of anthropocentrism, and the two laugh at this calamity.
- Dialogue of Malambruno and Farfarello. The magician Malambruno summons the demon Farfarello from Hell and asks him about happiness. The demon replies that it is impossible, since humanity experiences it only in fleeting moments, as humans are by nature unhappy and perpetually directed toward unfulfilled desires.
- Dialogue of Nature and a Soul. Nature has just created a soul destined to enter a human body and wishes it eternal unhappiness. The soul asks why, and Nature explains the miseries of earthly existence and the sorrows it will have to endure, since the soul is the seat of human feelings, whereas plants and animals feel nothing. In the end, compelled to fulfill its destiny, the soul begs Nature to allow it to die as soon as possible, together with the body it is about to enter.
- Dialogue of the Earth and the Moon. The Earth believes itself to be at the center of the universe but is contradicted by the Moon. The two celestial bodies reflect on the illusion of dominion and recognize that unhappiness is not confined to Earth but affects the Moon and all the planets of the universe.
- The Wager of Prometheus. The Titan Prometheus maintains that the human race he created is perfect. Momo, son of Sleep and Night and personification of malicious gossip, disagrees, and the two make a wager to find the happiest being on Earth. The dialogue develops the idea of human unhappiness and wickedness, which civilization serves only to increase.
- Dialogue of a Physicist and a Metaphysician. The dialogue contrasts a philosopher (the metaphysician) with a modern scientist (the physicist), who boasts of having expanded the prospects of progress by inventing a remedy that prolongs human life; however, life is less unhappy the more it is agitated and occupied.
- Dialogue of Torquato Tasso and His Familiar Genius. Torquato Tasso, during his imprisonment in the Hospital of Saint Anne, receives a vision of a beneficent spirit. The poet reflects on the sad condition of humanity, in which pleasure is never a present reality but either a memory or regret for things past, or a false hope for the future.
- Dialogue of Nature and an Icelander. An Icelandic wanderer in search of tranquility encounters Nature in Africa. Nature is depicted as a hostile and indifferent deity, an eternal and mechanical creator and destroyer of life, and the cause of humanity's natural unhappiness.
- Parini, or On Glory. Giuseppe Parini speaks to a pupil about the benefits of literature and culture; however, in the nineteenth century, such virtues of writing have lost all value, as writing now serves only to entertain an ignorant and unpoetic public.
- Dialogue of Frederick Ruysch and His Mummies. A scientist attempts to discover what humans experience in the moments before and after death by questioning a chorus of mummified corpses, and learns that death is not an evil but a relief from human suffering, akin to the languor of falling asleep.
- Memorable Sayings of Filippo Ottonieri. The philosopher Ottonieri discovers his talent for writing after reading Ugo Foscolo and uses it to denounce the hypocrisies of his society.
- Dialogue of Christopher Columbus and Pedro Gutierrez. Columbus converses with a fellow traveler about the wonders of the known world: it is an exaltation of the active life as a means of dispelling boredom and pain and, by inevitably encountering dangers, making life itself more precious.
- Encomium of Birds. The philosopher Amelius praises the virtues of birds as beings naturally inclined to pleasure and joy. Humanity, by contrast, is the most unhappy of all animals, and its laughter arises not from a serene disposition but from existential disorder.
- Song of the Wild Rooster. Pain and cruelty prevail in the world without any discernible reason, dominated by materialism and the absence of good and happiness. Life is a burden preferable only to death, toward which all created things in the universe continually hasten.
- Apocryphal Fragment of Strato of Lampsacus. A philosopher theorizes the origins and causes of the universe, developing the concept of the eternity of matter, though not of its actualizations, since matter is perpetually agitated by forces that produce continuous change: material forms are born and die, while matter assumes ever new forms.
- Dialogue of Timander and Eleander. Two interlocutors, one an admirer of humanity, the other its commiserator, discuss the eternal unhappiness of humankind and conclude that the only remedy is medicinal laughter.
- Copernicus. A weary Earth informs the Sun that it will cede dominion to it and content itself with orbiting around it. The dialogue addresses the nullity of the human race in opposition to those philosophers who place humanity at the center of the universe.
- Dialogue of Plotinus and Porphyry. The dialogue justifies suicide according to reason but rejects it according to sentiment, through which nature reconciles humanity with life.
- Dialogue of an Almanac Seller and a Passerby. An almanac seller announces a new year full of auspicious events to a skeptical passerby, who sees humanity as perpetually awaiting a better future that never arrives, reaching the end of life without achieving happiness.
- Dialogue of Tristan and a Friend. Tristan, formerly a pessimist, has changed his views and now endorses the optimistic theories of progress of the new century. This work serves as a defense of the Operette morali and the conclusion of Leopardi's thought, now magnanimously directed toward the desire for death.

== Models and sources ==
The principal model for the Operette morali is ancient Menippean satire. The work is dominated by the imitation of Lucian's Dialogues of the Dead, which for Leopardi serves as a model of style. Nothing similar had ever existed in Italian literature. Leopardi emulates its comedy and witty maneuvers, moving from an elevated register to low dialogue and gratuitous imitation.

The numerous inserted passages within the individual operette vary in such a way as to emphasize the paratext while simultaneously depriving it of meaning: for example, in the Dialogue of Frederick Ruysch, one finds simultaneously an opening chorus, a fantastic novella, comic theater, and a dialogue of the dead; or in the Song of the Wild Rooster, prose poetry, comic themes juxtaposed with biblical motifs, and deliberate stylistic contrasts, which the author explains as follows:

French writing, which is entirely detached, in which the periods are never connected with what precedes them [...], whose style never unfolds [...], is a kind of gnomologia. In this respect, French writing resembles Oriental style, which is also entirely fragmented, as can be seen in the poetic and sapiential books of Scripture.

— Giacomo Leopardi, Zibaldone di pensieri, pp. 2615–16.

The pretense of a manuscript has as its prototype Luigi Pulci, while the Wager of Prometheus and the Dialogue of Nature and an Icelander provide the best examples of the fusion of narration and dialogue. In Parini, or On Glory, the form of a Ciceronian treatise is also employed.

Writing in the manner of Lucian is a deliberate choice aimed at elevating comedy and providing the most effective means of giving free rein to the author's imagination; it is not merely a rhetorical exercise or "grammatical trifles."

There is no precedent in the previous history of Italian literature for the Operette morali, that is, for another book dealing with profound, entirely philosophical and metaphysical subject matter. In terms of the contamination of genres and the variety of internal stylistic registers, Leopardi was preceded by Leon Battista Alberti with his Intercenales. The vast scholarly apparatus and innumerable cultural references and sources serve as a literary disguise that accounts for the playful and parodic tone of the text.

Leopardi draws on the genre as practiced by Lucian and authors inspired by him: during the Humanist and Renaissance periods, Leon Battista Alberti's Vita and Niccolò Machiavelli's The Life of Castruccio Castracani; more recently, Laurence Sterne's The Life and Opinions of Tristram Shandy, Gentleman (see the Memorable Sayings of Filippo Ottonieri). The remark of Malambruno ("Make me happy for a moment") and the ball game between Hercules and Atlas have been linked to Goethe's Faust.

Influences are also evident from eighteenth-century argumentative essayistic writing and philosophical fiction (Voltaire, Diderot), commemorative encomia, apocryphal fragments, and collections of memorable sayings attributed to famous men. Among the characters featured are scientists (Copernicus), historical figures (Christopher Columbus), and philosophers (Plotinus, Porphyry).

Socrates represents a model of philosophy and the founder of the moral system of Western culture: Leopardi considered ethics the most important part of philosophy in general. However, in certain passages of the Memorable Sayings of Filippo Ottonieri, the text takes on a conventional, excessively bookish quality that lacks authenticity.

Many of Leopardi's dialogues possess a skeptical philosophical character typical of moralistic literature, both ancient (Lucian) and modern (Enlightenment). In defending his convictions against attacks from Niccolò Tommaseo, for example, the poet appeals to the Pyrrhonism of Pierre Bayle:

I am not aware that all my principles are negative; but even if they were, that would not greatly surprise me, for I recall Bayle's dictum that in metaphysics and morals, reason can only destroy, not build.

— Giacomo Leopardi, letter to Antonio Fortunato Stella, 23 August 1827, no. 541.

Aside from Lucian, the most significant literary models, in terms of style alone, are primarily Enlightenment authors. Leopardi admired the superficiality and lightness of Bernard le Bovier de Fontenelle; the cynicism of Voltaire's Candide informs the state of mind of the Icelander. A remark by Christoph Martin Wieland is the source of Eleander's misanthropy. Among Italian authors, Ludovico Ariosto was particularly dear to Leopardi, and the Dialogue of the Earth and the Moon best exemplifies his comic style. The vast array of literary sources cited, either directly or indirectly, belongs to the author's extensive cultural background: these references create an atmosphere of amused erudition within the text, an ironic display of culture that is deliberately frivolous. Identifying the boundary between allusive irony, poetic reuse, and conscious or unconscious reminiscence within the text is difficult. Nonetheless, Leopardi's writing always entails a dense intertextual dialogue.

This work therefore assumes importance as a necessary moment in the evolution of Leopardi's spirituality, and the dialogues possess an intrinsic lyrical and poetic value.

=== Grammatical trifles ===
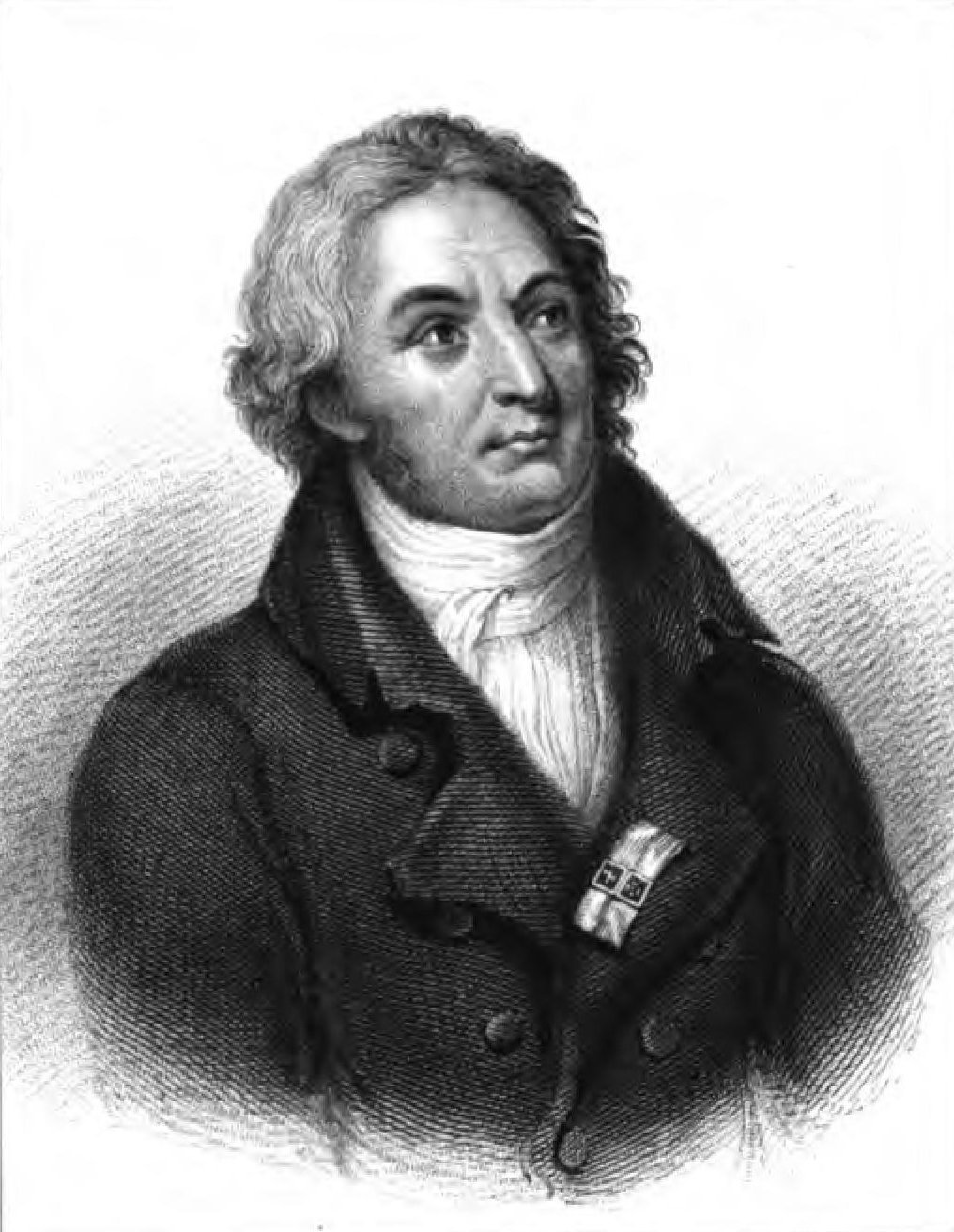
Vincenzo Monti

The Operette morali present themselves as a collection of texts that appear to be disconnected, without a unifying framework or explicit thematic links. Formally, they exhibit the use of a highly elevated expressive register; the paratextual techniques involve fictitious texts, purportedly discovered manuscripts or translations, and apocryphal works. The reader is compelled to follow the line of reasoning from continually varying perspectives.

This systematic variation imparts to the texts an unmistakable originality in their philosophical, moral, and poetic dimensions. The author's thought is not confined within the boundaries of any individual text, but deliberately extends into other parts of the work without interruption. The reader's curiosity regarding sensitive themes finds satisfaction precisely through continued reading.

The work can be considered an open work precisely because of the "triumph of imagination and creative impulse that governs invention in conflict with the expectation of a systematic structure promised by the title".

The only available model at the time consisted of prose pieces written in the "manner of Lucian" by Vincenzo Monti. The Romagnol poet had revived the genre, avoiding the overused dialogue of the dead, and had included several compositions in the four volumes of Proposta di alcune correzioni e aggiunte al vocabolario della Crusca, published between 1817 and 1824. In March 1821, Leopardi carefully examined the examples produced by Monti before beginning work on his own project, which had already been conceived for some time. Despite this illustrious precedent, the operette remained an original work without direct successors in the history of Italian literature.

== Themes and content ==
This book is particularly important in the evolution of Leopardi's ideology, and the dialogues have intense lyrical value. As Mario Fubini observed, in the Operette one finds some myths-concepts: happiness, pleasure, love, hope, and nature, which are also central themes in the Canti. Happiness is absurd and impossible, but can seem lovable in its deceptive apparitions; pleasure is only a vain ghost; hope inspires pleasant imaginations even if it has no basis; love is a rare miracle that can give man the only real happiness, though short-lived; nature is indifferent or hostile to men, who anyway feel fascinated by natural beauty.

The themes revolve around the philosophical ideas of the author: the relationship of mankind with History and Nature, the comparison with the valours of the past and the degenerated situation of the present, illusions, glory and boredom.

One of the most famous dialogues is the Dialogo della Natura e di un Islandese, in which the author expresses his main philosophical ideas, through the imaginary meeting, "in the heart of Africa", between a simple man coming from Iceland and a giant, beautiful and terrible woman, Nature, who has been chasing and oppressing him everywhere.

=== Title ===
The title binds together the two principal aspects of Leopardi's work: its satirical character and its moral purpose.

Operette is a diminutive expressing humility: these are brief compositions, considered small both in extent and in value by the author. However, their concision contributes to rendering them lucid, programmatic, and clear in their philosophical and poetic effectiveness. The term morali indicates the philosophical content: the mores, or customs, express the intention to identify new models of behavior by juxtaposing antiquity and modernity, with an implicit reference to the Opuscula Moralia of Plutarch.

This canonical attenuation of the ancient and humanistic moral genre also recalls Isocrates, some of whose Operette morali Leopardi translated, as well as Plutarch, up to Niccolò Machiavelli and Enlightenment moralism.

The Operette derive their title also from the practical, not merely theoretical, message they convey: by proposing a humble remedy to the pernicious effects of modern philosophy or truth, they seek to recover the inexperience, passions, and imagination of antiquity (which are founded on falsehood), the only remedy for improving the quality of human life; alternatively, they suggest tactics of narcotization to alleviate suffering.

A similar commitment is evident in another work from 1826, the Discorso sopra lo stato presente dei costumi degli italiani, in which political, moral, and historical purposes are clearly apparent.

=== Materialist phase ===
By the end of 1824, Leopardi's thought had turned toward materialism, as attested by the readings of the baron d'Holbach noted in the Zibaldone. The pessimistic aspect, which a portion of the criticism uses to refer to his philosophy, must be reconsidered because it was not accepted by the author himself:

Everything is evil. [...] Each thing that exists is an evil; each thing exists for the sake of evil; the purpose of the universe is evil; [...] There is no other good than non-being: there is no other good than that which is not; [...] all things are evil. [...] Existence, by its nature and essence, both general and proper, is an imperfection, an irregularity, a monstrosity. But this imperfection is a very small thing, [...] because all the worlds that exist, [...] not being certainly infinite, either in number or in magnitude, are consequently infinitely small compared to what the universe could be if it were infinite; and the entirety of what exists is infinitely small compared to true infinity, [...] to non-existence, to nothingness. This system, although it clashes with our ideas, [...] would perhaps be more defensible than that of Leibniz, of Pope, etc., "that all is good." However, I would not dare extend it to say that the existing universe is the worst of all possible universes, thereby substituting pessimism for optimism. Who can know the limits of possibility?

— Giacomo Leopardi, Zibaldone di pensieri, p. 4174, 22 April 1826.

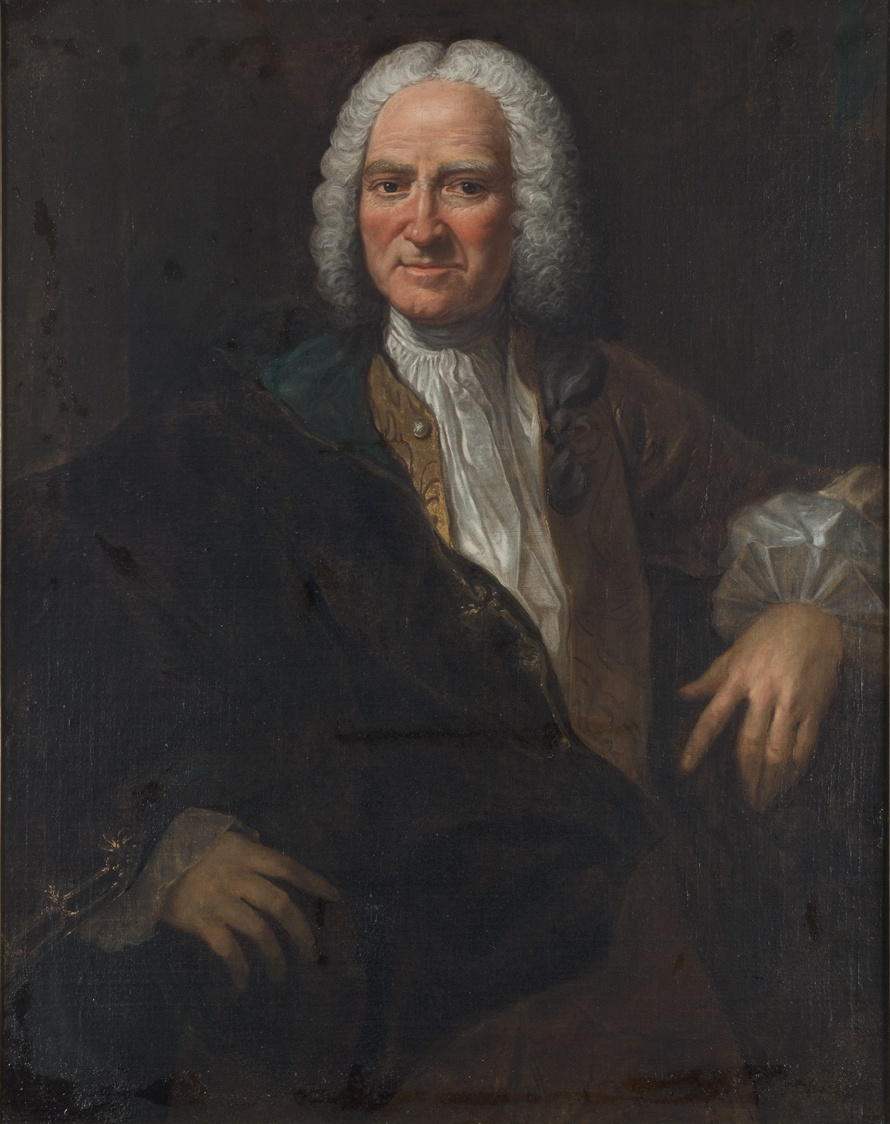
Baron d'Holbach

The Frammento apocrifo di Stratone da Lampsaco represents the philosophical culmination of the book. Together with the Dialogo della Natura e di un Islandese and the Dialogo del un venditore di almanacchi e di un passeggere, these operette most fully define Leopardi's materialism. The purpose of nature is not the good but the preservation of beings in life. Life is unhappy: it is better to have a short existence, intense and rich in strong illusions, than a long one, filled with diluted and narcotizing emotions.

"To whom does this most unhappy life of the universe please, and to whose benefit is it?" No philosopher knows how to answer this question. It represents a defeat for philosophical thought and, more generally, the demonstration of the inadequacy of philosophy to explain the condition of the human race in the universe. The Cantico del gallo silvestre, with its lyrical progression, sets forth monolithic pronouncements that leave the reader expecting a philosophical solution: "Thus this marvelous and terrifying mystery of universal existence, before it can be explained or understood, will vanish and be lost." This solution is provided in the Frammento apocrifo di Stratone da Lampsaco:

The different modes of being of matter [...] are perishable and transient; but no sign of perishability or mortality is apparent in matter universally, and therefore no sign that it has had a beginning, nor that it required or requires any cause or force outside itself in order to be.

— Giacomo Leopardi, Frammento apocrifo di Stratone da Lampsaco

=== Apparent lightness ===
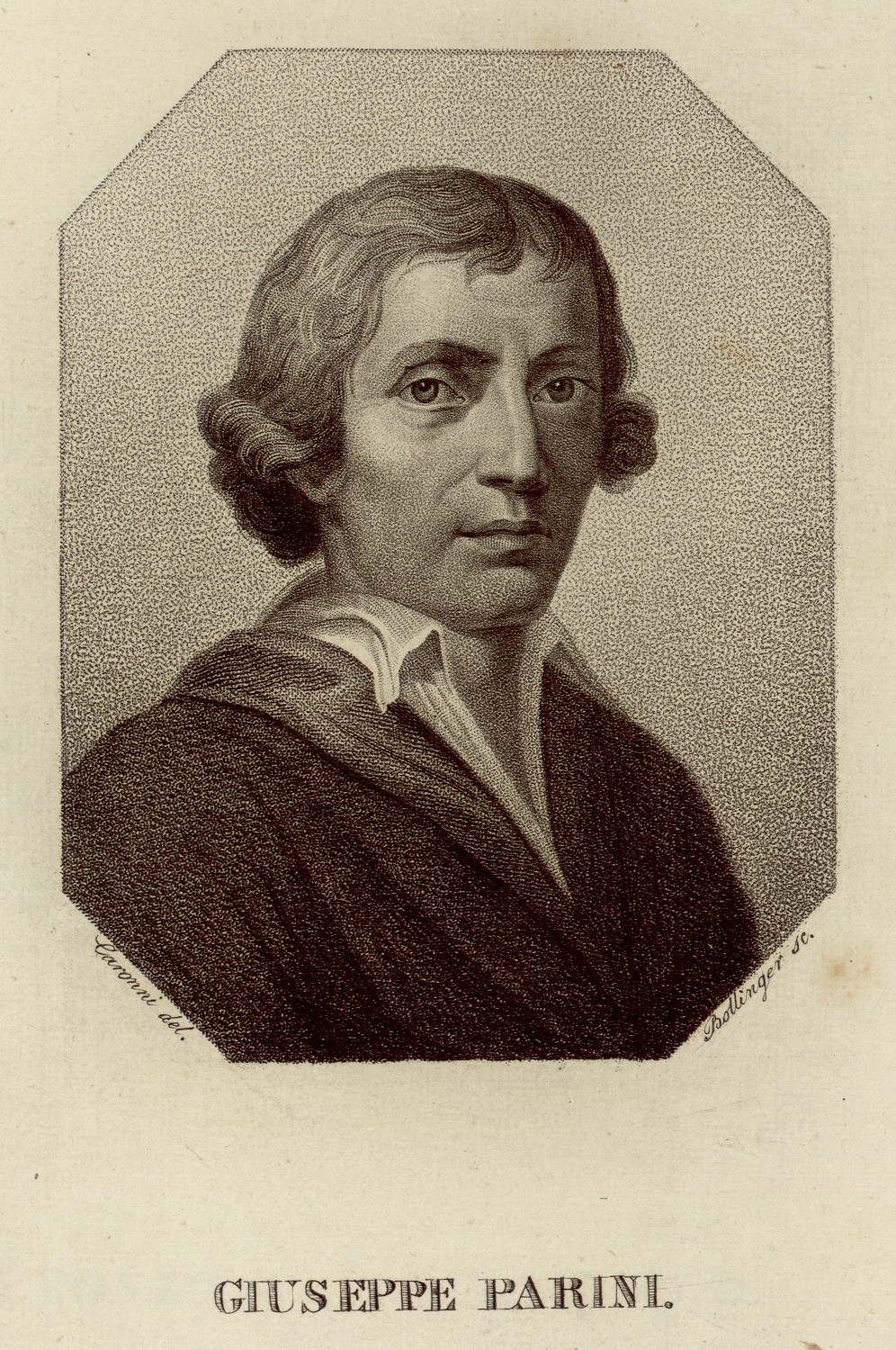
Giuseppe Parini

Within the operette, various themes particularly dear to the poet are pursued and prevail over one another. One frequently recurring theme is natural perfection. This condition implies a state of happiness that is by nature impossible for human beings to attain ("Scommessa di Prometeo", "Dialogo di un Fisico e un Metafisico"), whereas it is granted to other species, such as birds ("Elogio degli uccelli"), which are a symbol of continuous, harmonious, swift, and elegant movement. The absence of happiness in the world is proof of its imperfection, and the miserable human condition, verified by Prometheus, is an irrefutable truth, symbolically established through a wager.

Unable to attain natural perfection, human beings can achieve a state of excellence through intellect and reason: the genius. This is the theme of the "Parini", in which the poet is called upon to renounce glory due to the disproportion between the progress of knowledge and the unhappy condition of the genius. This situation is also addressed in the "Dialogo della Natura e di un'Anima", where glory is associated with a wretched human condition in which greatness and unhappiness are two inseparable aspects, and great minds relate poorly to the rest of the world (see also the "Ottonieri"). The Soul therefore requests to be lodged in the most imperfect and stupid human being.

Another theme that recurs across multiple operette is suicide, presented in the "Storia del genere umano" as a death that is either predetermined or can be anticipated before life itself. It is a desire peculiar to human beings and foreign to all other living creatures. In the "Fisico e Metafisico", Leopardi explains that it is not life but happiness that is loved by human beings. That appears in the Dialogo di Plotino e di Porfirio, in which two ancient philosophers, Plotinus and Porphyry, debate on the meaning of life and the choice of death as a possible exit from senseless existence. The dialogue ends by refusing suicide, not in the name of superior rules or religious creeds, but in the name of human solidarity. Men have so many causes of sorrow that it would be wrong to add another one, such as the loss of a friend or a loved person. Instead, says Plotinus, "let us help each other to endure this struggle of life, which anyway will be short". In the earlier poems Bruto minore and Ultimo canto di Saffo, suicide is presented, instead, as the action of a great soul rejecting cowardice and bleakness of life.

The comparison between ancients and moderns is explored in the "Timandro", the "Tristano", the "Dialogo d'Ercole e Atlante", and "Moda e Morte". Ancient vitality is contrasted with modern inertia: Hercules and Atlas play with the Earth as if it were a light, lifeless ball; Fashion has eliminated the exercises and labors that are beneficial to the body and extinguished in human beings the desire for glory and immortality that was characteristic of the ancients; in the "Parini", the argument is developed that action is superior to thinking and writing.

The last dialogue, Dialogo di Tristano e di un Amico, reflects Leopardi's experience and thoughts as a person of Tristano. The name of this character is inspired by the famous legendary hero, and by Laurence Sterne's Tristram Shandy. The incipit describes the "Operette" themselves as a "melancholic book", and "a desperate one". Later, however, Tristan ironically expresses admiration for the new times and for the optimistic faith in a better future, but he ends up proudly affirming his refusal of all illusions, and by courageously facing "tutte le conseguenze di una filosofia dolorosa, ma vera (all the consequences of an agonizing but true philosophy)". Many similarities can be found with the themes of "La Ginestra".

The theory of pleasure arising from the idea of vastness and the indefinite is the most famous and well-known theme of the author, extensively explored in his other major works, the Zibaldone and the Canti. Related to this theory are several subsidiary themes: boredom, which arises from habituation and a life devoid of great actions ("Tasso", "Porfirio"); risk and distraction, which remove human beings from tedium and, for a few moments, capture the essence of life, all the more so when it is put at stake ("Colombo", "Elogio degli uccelli", "Storia del genere umano"); great feelings, the only ones capable of moving the heart to great actions; and finally wonder, experienced in dreams, through the marvels perceived by the ancients, in children, in the uncivilized, and in solitaries.

For Leopardi, life is pain, while death is the cessation of pain. This is a highly recurrent theme, almost the cornerstone of his thought. The poet proposes various means to combat pain. Sleep itself ("Dialogo Malambruno e Farfarello") provides relief when it renders reality vague and uncertain, never fully defined (in accordance with the theory of pleasure), or through the consumption of narcotic substances such as alcohol ("Tasso"). Death is "not very dissimilar from the pleasure that is caused in human beings by the languor of sleep at the moment when they are falling asleep" (Ruysch).

Boredom can be combated with sleep (with its narcotizing effect, likened to opium), but it is pain that serves as the remedy ("Tasso"). It is the most powerful of all feelings, "because while a man suffers, he does not experience boredom in any way." For Leopardi, happiness is impossible, while suffering is necessary to life.

== Language and style ==
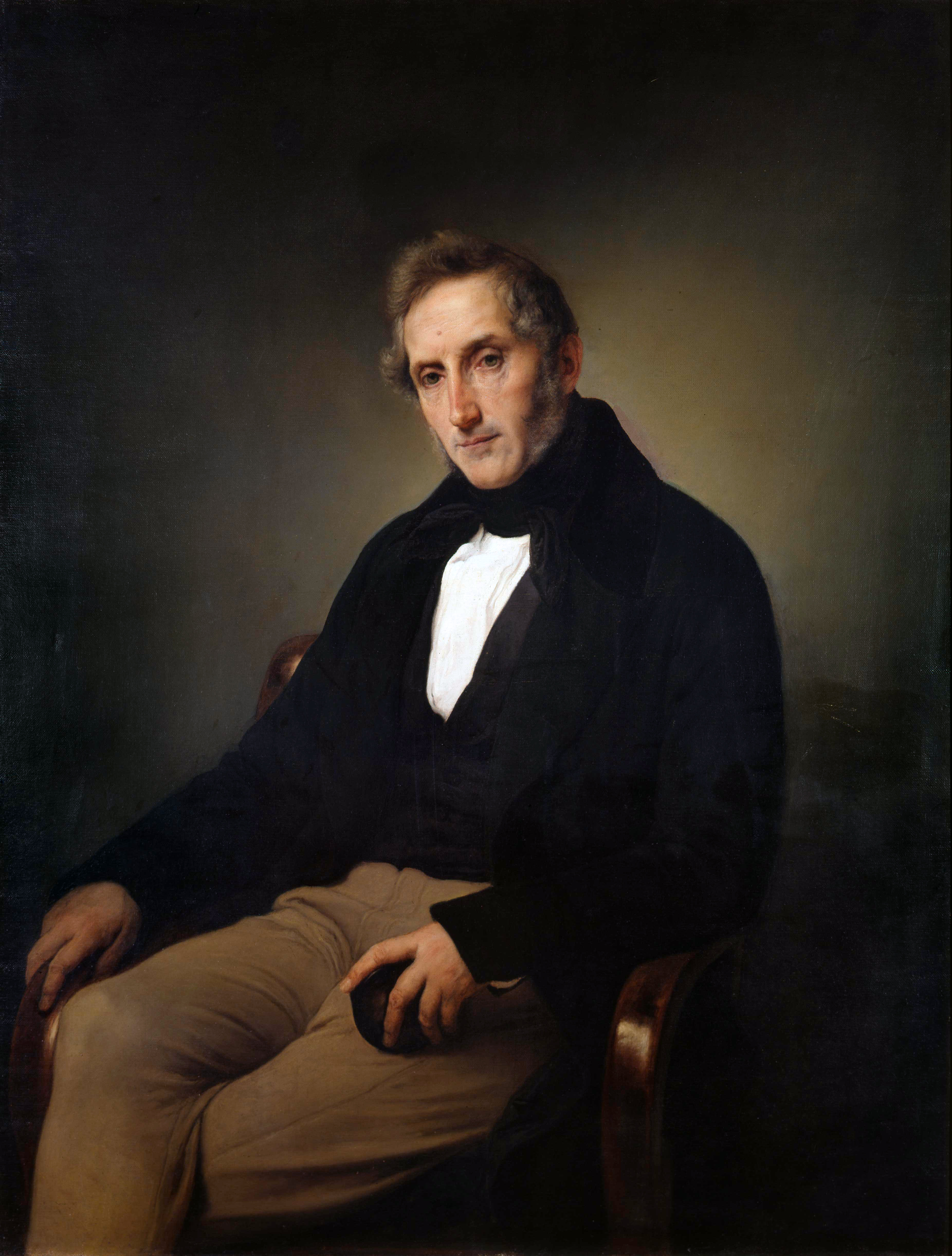
Alessandro Manzoni

The choice of language must be understood within the context of an ambitious literary project:

Anyone who wishes to do good for Italy must above all show it a philosophical language, without which I believe it will never have a modern literature that is properly its own, and without having a modern literature that is properly its own, it will never be a nation.

— Letter to Pietro Giordani, 13 July 1821, no. 201.

The style of the Operette morali is characterized as incisive, ironic, and compact, characterized by a clear and precise language, producing the effect of treating fundamental themes with extreme lucidity.

Leopardi rejects the two modern linguistic approaches: the puristic on one side and the French-influenced on the other. He also discards the hypotactic model, with its Latinate structure, which was favored by his friend Giordani. Instead, he opts for the recovery, within Italian at all its levels (including the popular), of everything that corresponds to Attic Greek.

According to Giulio Bollati, the Operette morali represent the culmination of Leopardi's political and civic commitment, which was to make Italy a nation through a common and modern Italian language.

The variety of the Italian language would make it possible to recover an ancient yet functional language, through which the author would achieve, above all, a simplification of syntax: reduced recourse to hypotaxis, rhetorical figures, and inversion of word order.

Significant are the techniques that intensify emotional impact: verbal multiplication and accumulation of clauses; the use of elative expressions and perplexed and indefinite verbal forms.

Many of the operette are structured as dialogues, following the style of philosophical discourse in ancient Greece or in eighteenth-century Enlightenment literature; the narrative pieces bear the imprint of Cicero, Machiavelli, Cervantes, Foscolo, Goethe, Laurence Sterne, and Vittorio Alfieri.

=== Paradox ===
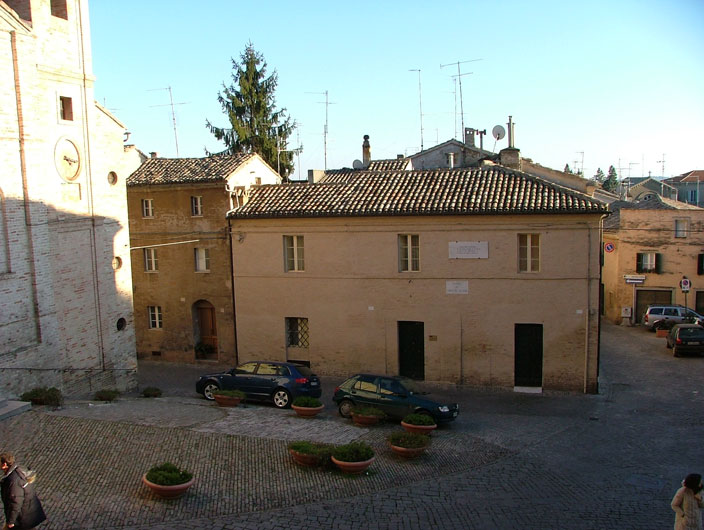
The Piazzetta of "Il Sabato del Villaggio", viewed from Giacomo Leopardi's room.

The technique employed by the author operates, like other solutions, on two levels: one structural, consisting of writing a book of moral philosophy intended to enable a better life, while being fully aware of the impossibility of bringing about any true good; the other micro-structural, involving the combination within the dialogues of ancient maxims and modern sentiments.

The instrument of paradox is an essential part of the philosophical thought and, together with irony, cannot be separated from Leopardi's discourse. In the Operette, there prevails an intentional playfulness designed to make the reader smile. The presence of a will to dismantle the customs of the time implies a continuous recourse to ironic action, which is a necessary instrument for constructing a dense network of relationships whose ultimate purpose is the rejection of the object ridiculed and, at the same time, the proposal of a different model of life: this allows the author to play and jest with contemporary human behaviors while maintaining the moral purpose of the work.

Laughter also has a medicinal function, alleviating the pains caused in human beings by naked truth. According to Leopardi, it is one of the few means by which a person can increase their own vitality ("Elogio degli uccelli").

=== Prosopopeia ===
Leopardi's continual recourse to imaginary beings (gnomes, sprites, mummies), historical figures (Torquato Tasso, Christopher Columbus, Giuseppe Parini), mythological figures (Hercules, Atlas, Jupiter), philosophical figures (Plotinus, Porphyry, Amelius), literary characters (Malambruno, Farfarello), ordinary people (passersby, Icelanders, peddlers), inanimate objects (the Earth, the Moon), and symbolic entities (Nature, the Soul, Death, Fashion) constitutes a satire of anthropocentrism, a derision of modern progress, and of a society in which destructive hatred prevails. All the protagonists possess a strong symbolic representativeness, achieved through the techniques of estrangement and prosopopeia, which animates elements that are not alive.

Leopardi never wished to appear in the text himself. He denies his own reality as an ideological character.

I had wanted to write a preface to the Operette morali, but it seemed to me that the ironic tone that pervades them, and the entire spirit of the work, absolutely excludes a preamble; and perhaps, upon reflection, you will agree with me that if there is any work that ought to be without a preface, this is one in particular.

— Giacomo Leopardi, letter to Antonio Fortunato Stella, 10 June 1826.

No protagonist is Giacomo himself; all are accomplices and spokespersons for his thought and his most intimate feelings. The continual use of citation and discursive argumentation on one hand, and didactic concerns, paradox, and irony on the other, produce in the reader a sense of estrangement and surprise; this is a condition strongly sought by the author, which would be nullified by personification at any level.

== Appendix to the Operette morali ==
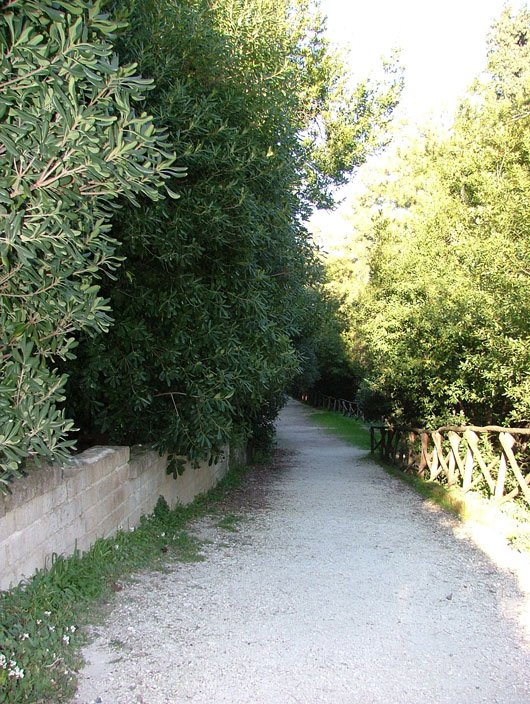
The path leading to the hill of the "L'infinito" near the Leopardi house.

The Appendice to the Operette morali was first assembled in a critical edition by Francesco Moroncini, collecting texts of diverse origin but attributable to the programmatic design of the author, particularly the primordial nucleus of the work, consisting of those texts that Leopardi defined, in a letter to Pietro Giordani, as Prosette satiriche.

== Notes to the Operette morali ==
The Note to the Operette morali, totaling sixty-two, were written by Leopardi between October and December 1824.

In the various editions, they underwent few modifications: some additions in the hand of Antonio Ranieri are noted, which were excluded in the critical edition by Moroncini.

Overall, they consist of precise information regarding certain subjects addressed in the work or curiosities of a historical, philosophical, or philological nature, as well as contemporary events. The poet himself explained their purpose and placement:

I advise that the notes should not be placed at the foot of the pages, but at the end of the volume, or of each volume for its respective part. It is true that on other occasions I have insisted that notes be placed at the foot of the page; but here the case is different: they do not serve to clarify or illustrate the text; they are a luxury of minor erudition that would encumber the reader if found at the foot of the page in the course of the work.

— Letter to Antonio Fortunato Stella, 19 January 1827.

== See also ==
- Niccolò Machiavelli
- Monaldo Leopardi
- Torquato Tasso
- Christopher Columbus
- Giuseppe Parini
- Pietro Giordani
- Vincenzo Monti
- Niccolò Tommaseo
- Giovan Pietro Vieusseux
- Alessandro Manzoni
- Antonio Ranieri

== Bibliography ==
=== Annotated editions ===
- Leopardi, Giacomo (1991). Marco Antonio Bazzocchi (ed.). Operette morali [Small Moral Works] (in Italian). Milan: Mondadori. ISBN 978-88-247-0077-1.
- Leopardi, Giacomo (2008). Laura Melosi (ed.). Operette morali [Small Moral Works] (in Italian). Milan: Biblioteca Universale Rizzoli. ISBN 978-88-17-02643-7.

=== Critics ===
- Binni, Walter (1997) [1947]. La nuova poetica leopardiana [The new Leopardi poetics] (in Italian). Florence: Sansoni. ISBN 978-88-383-1753-8.
- Marzot, Giulio (1966). Storia del riso leopardiano [History of Leopardi's laughter] (in Italian). Messina-Florence: D'Anna. ISBN 978-88-8321-176-8.
- Binni, Walter (1973). La protesta di Leopardi [Leopardi's protest] (in Italian). Florence: Sansoni. ISBN 978-88-383-0841-3.
- Galimberti, Cesare (1973). Linguaggio del vero in Leopardi [The language of truth in Leopardi] (in Italian). Florence: Olschki. ISBN 978-88-222-1675-5.
- Borlenghi, Aldo (1973). Leopardi. Dalle "Operette morali", ai "Paralipomeni" [Leopardi. From "Small Moral Works" to "Paralipomeni"] (in Italian). Milan: Cisalpino-Goliardica.
- Campailla, Sergio (1977). La vocazione di Tristano. Storia interiore delle "Operette morali" [Tristan's calling. An inner history of the "Small Moral Works"] (in Italian). Bologna: Pàtron. ISBN 978-88-555-1411-8.
- Melani, Viviana (1979). Leopardi e la poesia del Cinquecento [Leopardi and Sixteenth-Century Poetry] (in Italian). Messina-Florence: D'Anna.
- Tartaro, Achille (1978). Leopardi (in Italian). Bari: Laterza. ISBN 978-88-420-0946-7.
- Tigani, Francesco (2008). "Cristoforo Colombo come Don Chisciotte: Leopardi e Unamuno a confronto" [Christopher Columbus as Don Quixote: Leopardi and Unamuno compared]. Información Filosófica (in Italian). V: 173–182.
- Binni, Walter (1987). Lettura delle "Operette morali" [Reading of the "Small Moral Works"] (in Italian). Genoa: Lampi di stampa. ISBN 978-88-488-0020-4.
- Blasucci, Luigi (1989). I tempi della satira leopardiana [The times of Leopardi's satire] (in Italian).
- Ferraris, Angiola (1991). La vita imperfetta. Le "Operette morali" di Giacomo Leopardi [The imperfect life. Giacomo Leopardi's "Small Moral Works"] (in Italian). Genoa: Marietti. ISBN 978-88-211-9564-8.
- Frattini, Alberto (1990). Leopardi. Il problema delle fonti alla radice della sua opera [Leopardi. The problem of sources at the root of his work] (in Italian). Rome: Coletti. ISBN 978-88-7826-702-2.
- Valentini, Alvaro (1991). Leopardi. Idillio metafisico e poesia copernicana [Leopardi. Metaphysical idyll and Copernican poetry] (in Italian). Rome: Bulzoni. ISBN 978-88-7119-369-4.
- Secchieri, Filippo (1992). Con leggerezza apparente. Etica e ironia nelle "Operette morali" [With apparent lightness. Ethics and irony in the "Small Moral Works"] (in Italian). Modena: Mucchi. ISBN 978-88-7000-201-0.
- Binni, Walter (1994). Lezioni leopardiane [Leopardian Lessons] (in Italian). Florence: La Nuova Italia. ISBN 978-88-221-1494-5.
- Cellerino, Liana (1995). Giacomo Leopardi, Operette morali, Letteratura italiana – Le Opere vol. III [Giacomo Leopardi, Small Moral Works, Italian Literature – The Works vol. III] (in Italian). Turin: UTET.
- Macciocca, Gabriella (2000). Letteratura Italiana, Dizionario delle opere M-Z [Italian Literature, Dictionary of Works M-Z] (in Italian). Turin: Einaudi. ISBN 978-88-06-15395-3.
