= Monte Milone =

Monte Milone or Montemilone may refer to:

- Montemilone a town (municipality), in the Basilicata region of south Italy
- Monte Milone, an ancient denomination of Pollenza, in the Marche region of central Italy
- Monte Milone (meteorite), a meteorite fallen in 1846 in Pollenza in the central Italy
