= Biagetti =

Biagetti is an Italian surname. Notable people with the surname include:

- Biagio Biagetti (1877–1948), Italian painter and art restorer
- Giuliano Biagetti (1925–1998), Italian film director and screenwriter
