= Cingolani =

Cingolani is an Italian surname. Notable people with the surname include:

- Andrea Cingolani (born 1990), Italian male artistic gymnast
- Angela Maria Guidi Cingolani (1896–1991), Italian politician
- Daniel Cingolani (born 1961), Argentine racing driver
- Giovanni Cingolani (1859–1932), Italian painter and art-restorer
- Luciano Cingolani (born 2001), Argentine footballer
- Marco Cingolani (born 1961), Italian painter
- Mario Cingolani (1883–1971), Italian Christian Democrat politician
- Roberto Cingolani (born 1961), Italian scientist
