= Biagio Biagetti =

Italian painter (1877–1948)

Biagio Biagetti (21 July 1877 – 2 April 1948) was an Italian painter and art-restorer, mainly working with sacred subjects.

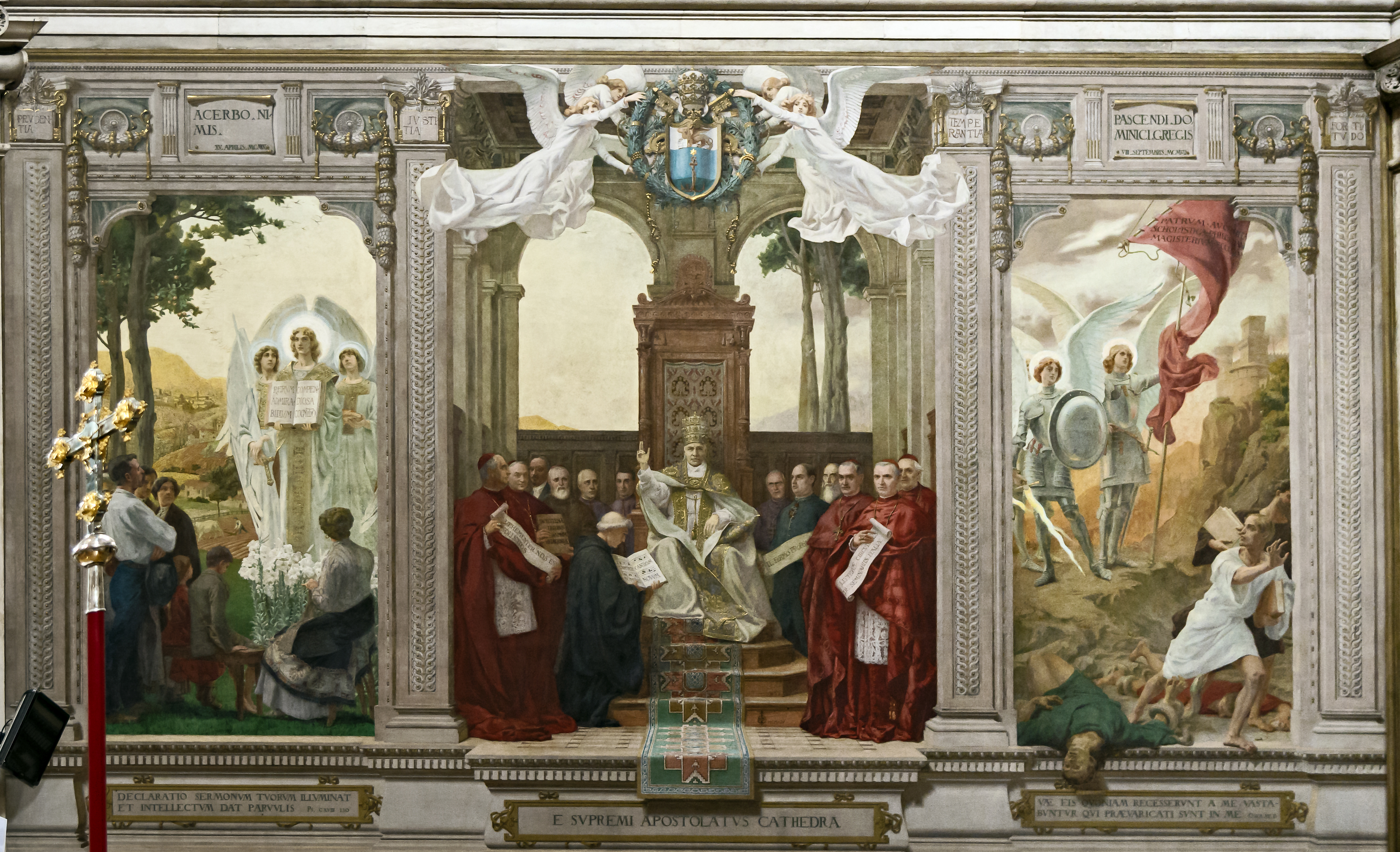
Apotheosis of St Pius X, painted for the Duomo of Treviso

== Biography ==
He was born in Porto Recanati and died in Macerata. He trained under Ludovico Seitz.

In 1921, Pope Benedict XV appointed Biagetti to be Artistic Director for the Paintings Gallery and the Apostolic Palaces, a position he maintained through the papacy of Pius XII. There he worked on restorations of various works, including frescoes. He also worked on new mosaics and restorations. He was also a member of the Academy of St Luke, Rome. He retired in Recanati, in 1945 he was appointed to help with post-war Reconstruction. He also restored the old Academy of poetic "Disuguali", founded by Monaldo Leopardi. He painted one of the chapels in San Biagio, Pollenza. His paintings can be seen also in Loreto, Macerata, Jesi, Montelupone, Porto Recanati, Padova, Treviso, Parma, Udine, Lendinara, and Rome.
