= San Biagio, Pollenza =

Roman Catholic collegiate church in Pollenza, Italy

Coordinates: 43.269184°N 13.346530°E

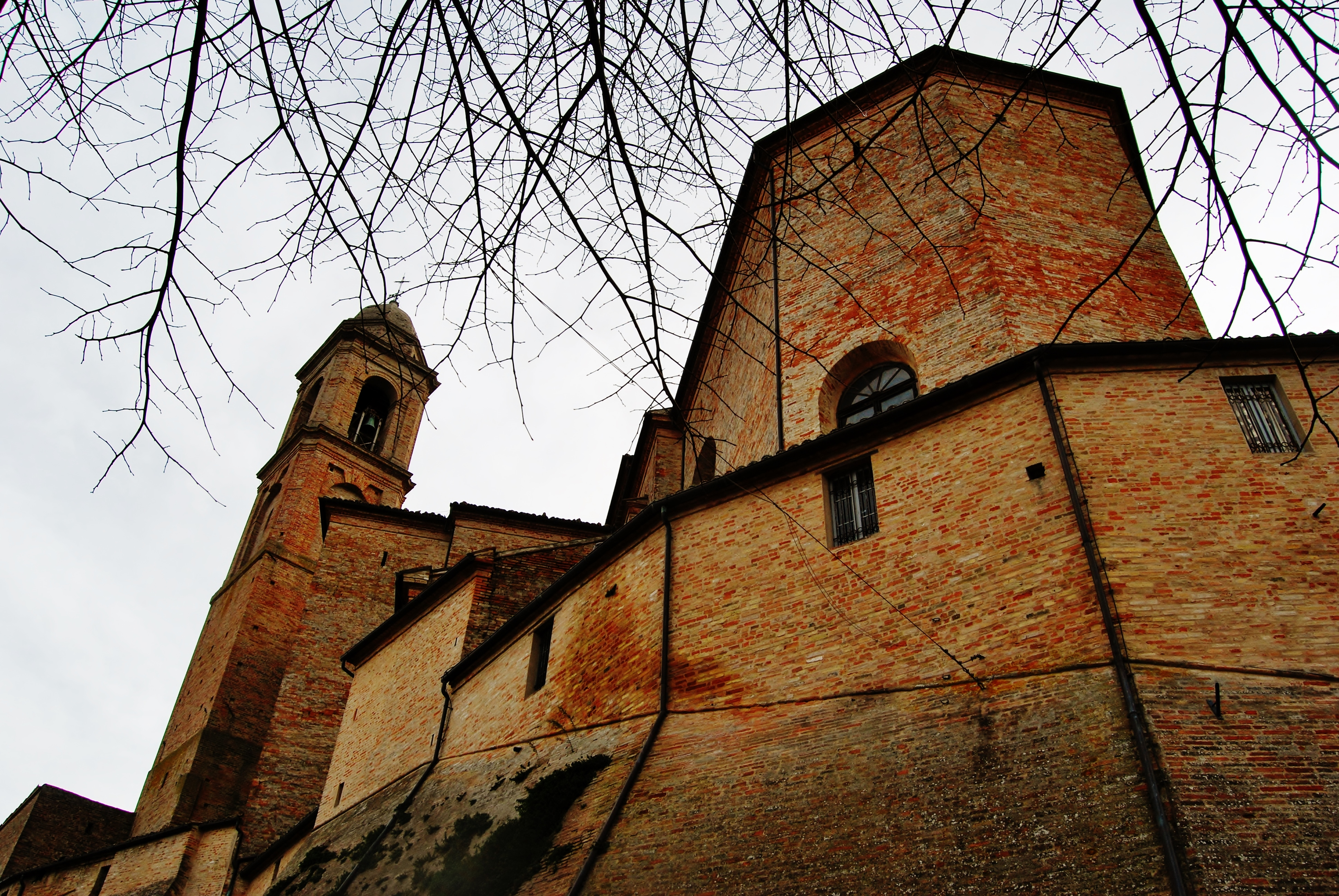

San Biagio is a Neoclassical-style, Roman Catholic collegiate church located in the town of Pollenza, province of Macerata, region of Marche, Italy.

== History ==
The church was designed in 1834 by De Mattia of Treia with a Greek Cross layout. The areal had since 1269, housed a small Romanesque church dependent on the Rambona Abbey, complete with an adjacent convent and cloister. That church was razed in 1791 to erect one befitting the population increase. The architect Bracci had initially planned a church resembling the Pantheon in Rome, but the ceiling collapsed. This led to the reconstruction by De Mattia in 1834, whose design was influenced by a church designed by Valadier for Monte San Pietrangeli.

The façade has tall columns holding a triangular tympanum over a pronaos. The tall (35 meter) belltower was completed by 1844, and the base starts with the ancient campanile tower.

The cupola, main chapel, and nave were frescoed by Virginio Monti. Behind the main altar is a canvas depicting St John the Baptist and St Blaise below the Virgin. The Chapels belong to local confraternities: on the left, the Chapel of Holiest Sacrament, decorated by Giovanni Cingolani with a depiction of the Story and Glory of the Eurcharist; on the right, the Chapel of the Holiest Crucifix depicting the Passion of Christ by Biagio Biagetti. The interior decoration also includes paintings by at Domenico Tojetti and Giuseppe Fammilume. Above the entry portal is an organ made by the Callido family in 1793.
