= Monte Milone (meteorite) =

Meteorite

- Type: Chondrite
- Class: Ordinary chondrite
- Group: L5
- Country: Italy
- Region: Marche
- Coordinates: 43°16′N 13°21′E
- Observed fall: Yes
- Fall date: May 8, 1846
- TKW: 3.13 kg

Monte Milone is meteorite that fell in 1846 in central Italy.

== History ==
Monte Milone fell on 8 May 1846, in Pollenza in the central Italian region of Marche. It was found by the mineralogist Giovanni Strüver and then bought and described by Monsignor Lavinio de' Medici Spada(1846).

== Composition and classification ==
It is a L5 type ordinary chondrite.

== See also ==
- Glossary of meteoritics
- Meteorite
