= San Giuseppe, Pollenza =

Building in Pollenza, Italy

Coordinates: 43.266376°N 13.348772°E

San Giuseppe is a Baroque-style, Roman Catholic church located on Via Roma #11 in the town of Pollenza, province of Macerata, region of Marche, Italy.

== History ==
A Renaissance-style church at the site was erected in 1562, but refurbished in the 18th century. The white stone curved portal is from the original church.

The main altar is highly decorated with gilded columns, framing an altarpiece depicting the Death of St Joseph by Giovanni Battista Caracciolo. Two other paintings, St Joseph's Dream and Flight to Egypt, by Caracciolo are in the nearby convent. The church has four lateral altars, and choir balconies.
