= Antonio Ranieri =

Italian writer and politician, friend of Giacomo Leopardi (1806–1888)

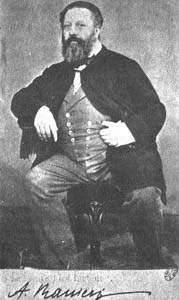
- Autographed photograph of Ranieri in old age.

Member of the Chamber of Deputies Kingdom of Italy
- In office 1861–1881
- Monarchs: Victor Emmanuel II, Humbert I

Member of the Senate
- In office 1882–1888
- Monarch: Humbert I

Personal details
- Born: 8 September 1806 Naples (Kingdom of the Two Sicilies)
- Died: 4 January 1888 (aged 81) Portici, Naples (Kingdom of Italy)
- Party: Historical Left
- Profession: Writer, Professor

Antonio Ranieri (8 September 1806 – 4 January 1888) was an Italian writer, patriot and politician, better known for his juvenile intimate friendship with Giacomo Leopardi (1798 – 1837), the most renowned 19th-century Italian poet.

== Biography ==
=== First years ===
First-born of Francesco Ranieri, a State official, and of Maria Luisa Conzo, Antonio Ranieri was born in Naples (Kingdom of the Two Sicilies) on 8 September 1806. A liberal since adolescence, and suspected of belonging to the Carbonari, Antonio Ranieri was forced to leave Naples in 1827 and settle in Florence (Grand Duchy of Tuscany), a city open to political refugees, the following year. In Florence he met important intellectuals and writers such as Pietro Giordani, Alessandro Poerio, Giovan Pietro Vieusseux, Pietro Colletta, Giuseppe Ricciardi and, above all, he met Giacomo Leopardi for the first time. In Bologna (Papal States), he was briefly a pupil of the famed hyperpolyglot Cardinal Giuseppe Caspar Mezzofanti, then moved to Paris, where he met Antoine Destutt de Tracy and Lafayette.

=== Friendship with Giacomo Leopardi ===
In 1830 he traveled throughout Europe, finally returning to Italy to begin a seven-years cohabitation with Leopardi, until the latter's death. This cohabitation, which was also the subject of rumors, was the central moment in Ranieri's life and made him famous as the "guardian" of the last years of the genius of Recanati. Leopardi's deep affection for Ranieri transpires from certain letters he wrote to him during a brief moment of separation (Ranieri being in Naples, Leopardi in Florence), for example:

My Ranieri. I crave you like the Messiah. You know well I can not abandon you. I send you a thousand kisses.

— Leopardi, Letter 876 – to Ranieri, 03/02/1833

My Ranieri. I write you nothing, but always. Without you, I am the most unhappy of the creatures, but I continue to ask you not to rush. Addio a thousand times.

— Leopardi, Letter 882 – to Ranieri, 03/19/1833

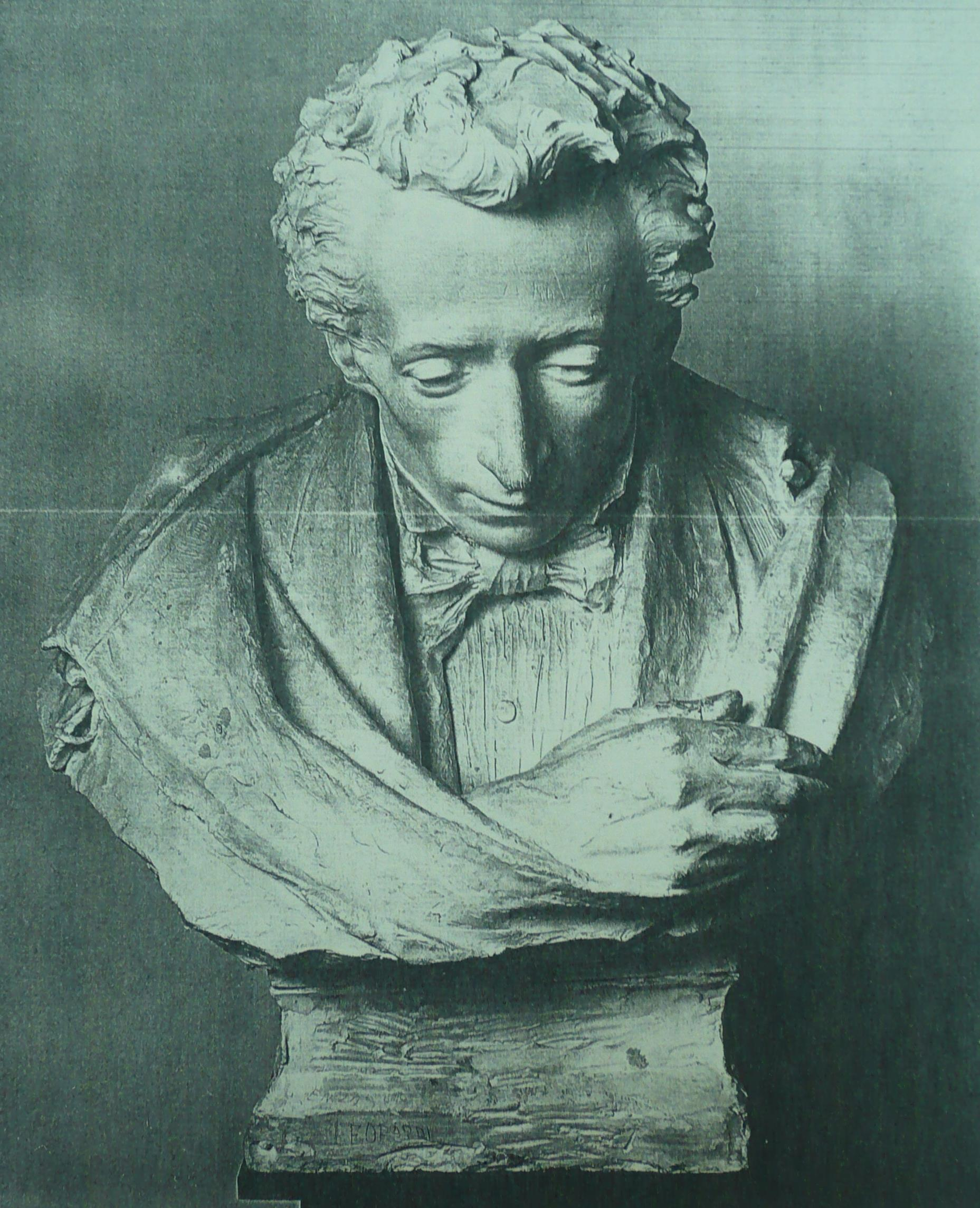
Marble bust of Leopardi, by Michele Tripisciano (1898).

After staying in Rome and Florence to follow Ranieri's mistress, actress Maddalena Pelzet, he and Leopardi met the noblewoman Fanny Targioni Tozzetti (1801 – 1889), whom both loved: Ranieri with success, Leopardi not. In 1833, Ranieri moved to Naples with Leopardi. Ranieri did not find a good welcome in his hometown, due to the controversial cohabitation with Leopardi and the unconventionality of the latter's thought. Nevertheless, he dedicated himself to historiography (Storia del Regno di Napoli, 1835) and literature (Ginevra o l’orfana della Nunziata, 1839), being favored by the association with Leopardi and close to his thought. His writings, marked by anti-clericalism, attacks on institutions and Italian patriotism, caused him troubles with censorship.

The correspondence between Ranieri and Leopardi is partially preserved at the Vittorio Emanuele III National Library of Naples and available in microfilms that have also been published. Already in their time, the amorous phrases they exchanged with each other had led to suggestions of a homoerotic relationship between Leopardi and Ranieri. Their close sodality lasted 7 years.

=== Leopardi's death and burial controversies ===
To defend himself from the cholera epidemic (see 1826–1837 cholera pandemic), in 1836 Ranieri moved with Leopardi to Torre del Greco (Naples), in a friend's country house.

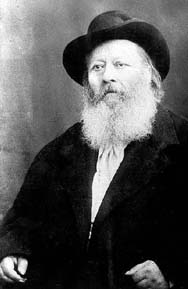
Ranieri in old age.

On 14 June 1837, when they returned to Naples, Leopardi died of heart dropsy, as Ranieri reported – even if there is a strong suspicion that the poet died of cholera, and that Ranieri lied in order to hide a less decorous death. Together with his sister Paolina, Ranieri assisted the poet to the end and, as he himself reported in his memoirs and his letters to Monaldo Leopardi, prevented the remains from being thrown into a mass grave (as well as the strict hygiene rules required due to the epidemic), having him buried first, and clandestinely, in the crypt, then in the atrium of the Church of S. Vitale in Fuorigrotta, a quarter of Naples. Nevertheless, Ranieri's story had immediately appeared full of contradictions and many doubts arose about what he had declared, also because his versions were many and different depending on the interlocutor, making one suspect that the poet's body was ended up in the mass graves of the Fontanelle Cemetery, or in the Cemetery of the 366 Fossae in Naples (such was the fate, in those days, of famous people like Niccolò Zingarelli), or even hidden in the Neapolitan house where the death had occurred, and that Ranieri had staged an empty coffin funeral, with the participation of his own brothers and a corrupt priest. Ranieri continued to state that the bones were in the atrium of the Church of S. Vitale and that the burial certificate was a forgery written by the priest in order to circumvent the law on burials in times of epidemic. However, it is proved that Ranieri lied in other cases: for example, he long maintained that he did not know where the 4,000 pages of Leopardi's Zibaldone di pensieri were: they were finally found in his house.

On 21 July 1900 the official reconnaissance of Leopardi's remains was carried out and in the coffin – too small to contain the skeleton of a man with double hump – only fragments of bones (including ribs, vertebrae bearing signs of deformity) were found, and a whole left femur, perhaps too long for a person of short stature as Leopardi was, and another broken femur), a heeled shoe and some rags, while there was no trace of the skull and the rest of the skeleton.

=== Later years ===
Forty years after Leopardi's death, Ranieri published the work that consecrated his fame to this day, Sette anni di sodalizio con Giacomo Leopardi (1880), a memoir followed by bitter controversies over the author's self-congratulation, the overabundance of details unfavorable to the poet's memory and the absence of reflections on his intellectual greatness. However, though inaccurate and inappropriate in some descriptions, he offered a testimony of the biographical events of the two friends.

In 1860, he returned to politics, taking an active part among the patriots who went to Salerno to invite the Freemason Giuseppe Garibaldi to enter Naples.

In 1861, Ranieri was elected as a Member of the Parliament of the Kingdom of Italy, being repeatedly confirmed until 1881. On 16 November 1882, he became a Senator of the Kingdom of Italy. He died in Portici (Naples) on 4 January 1888.

== Bibliography ==
- Leopardi, Giacomo (2010). Felici, Lucio; Trevi, Emanuele (eds.). Tutte le poesie, tutte le prose, e lo Zibaldone (in Italian). Rome: Newton & Compton. ISBN 9788854117105.
- Ranieri, Antonio (1995) [1880]. Bertazzoli, Raffaella (ed.). Sette anni di sodalizio con Giacomo Leopardi. Con un'appendice di lettere di Antonio Ranieri al conte Monaldo Leopardi (in Italian). Milan: Mursia. ISBN 9788842518105.
