= Giovanni Cingolani =

Italian painter and art-restorer (1859–1932)

Giovanni Cingolani (1859 - 23 April 1932) was an Italian painter and art-restorer, mainly working with sacred subjects.

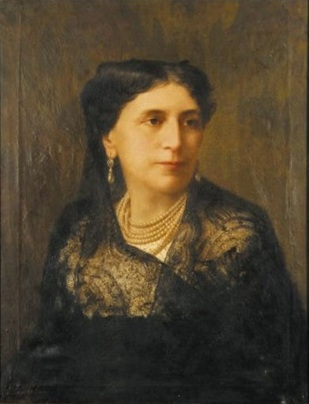
Portrait of Antoniny Łąckiej (1907) by Cingolani

== Biography ==
He was born in Montecassiano in the province of Macerata, region of Marche and died in Santa Fe, Argentina.

In 1880, he was named restorer of frescoes for the Vatican. He was also known as a portraitist, including painting a portrait of Pope Leo XIII. Among his masterworks is a large canvas still present in Macerata, depicting Torquato Tasso. He painted for the church of San Biagio, Pollenza.

In 1909, he emigrated to Argentina. In the town of Santa Fe, he was one of the founders of the Atheneum of Arts and Sciences. In that town, he painted ceiling a nave frescoes for the Basilica Nostra Signora del Carmine, and works for the church of Santo Domenico, and a canvas depicting the Virgin of the Miracles for the church of the Jesuits. In 1930, he was nominated to be member of the Accademia di Belle Arti di Perugia.
