= Pollenza =

- Comune
- Comune di Pollenza
- Location within Italy Location within Marche
- Coordinates: 43°16′N 13°21′E
- Country: Italy
- Region: Marche
- Province: Province of Macerata (MC)

Area
  - Total: 39.5 km^{2} (15.3 sq mi)

Population (Dec. 2004)
  - Total: 6,086
  - Density: 154/km^{2} (399/sq mi)
- Demonym: Pollentini
- Time zone: UTC+1 (CET)
  - Summer (DST): UTC+2 (CEST)
- Postal code: 62010
- Dialing code: 0733
- Website: Official website

Pollenza is a comune (municipality) in the Province of Macerata in the Italian region Marche, located about 40 kilometres (25 mi) southwest of Ancona and about 9 kilometres (6 mi) southwest of Macerata. As of 31 December 2004, it had a population of 6,086 and an area of 39.5 square kilometres (15.3 mi^{2}).

Pollenza borders the following municipalities: Macerata, San Severino Marche, Tolentino, Treia.

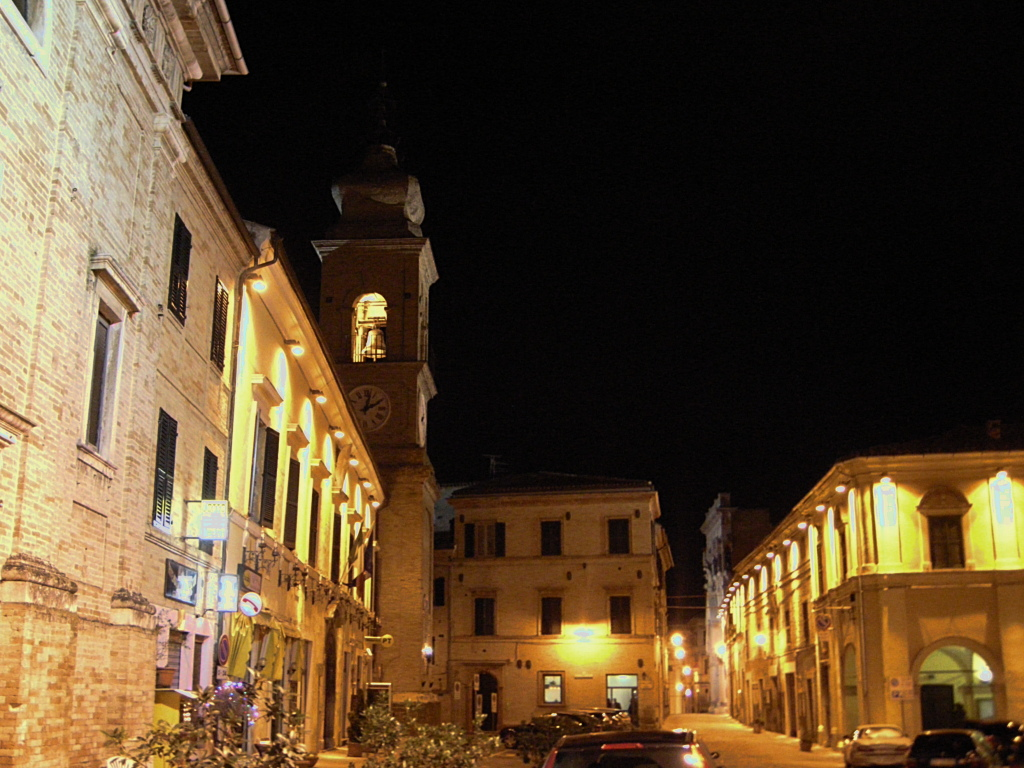
Pollenza plaza at night, March 2008

== Culture ==
Pollenza has a charming theater built in 1883, named after the Italian composer Giuseppe Verdi.

Among the religious buildings in town are:

- San Giuseppe: Baroque style church.
- Sant'Andrea Apostolo
- Abbazia di Rambona: remains of a Benedictine abbey, mainly the Church of Santa Maria Assunta, are located a few kilometers west of the town.
- San Biagio, Pollenza

== Demographic evolution ==
Historical population

Year	Pop.	±%
1861	5,470	—
1871	5,566	+1.8%
1881	5,400	−3.0%
1901	5,482	+1.5%
1911	5,160	−5.9%

Year	Pop.	±%
1921	5,428	+5.2%
1931	5,214	−3.9%
1936	5,525	+6.0%
1951	5,686	+2.9%
1961	5,073	−10.8%

Year	Pop.	±%
1971	5,181	+2.1%
1981	5,467	+5.5%
1991	5,550	+1.5%
2001	5,823	+4.9%

Source: Data from ISTAT
