= Monaldo Leopardi =

Italian philosopher and politician

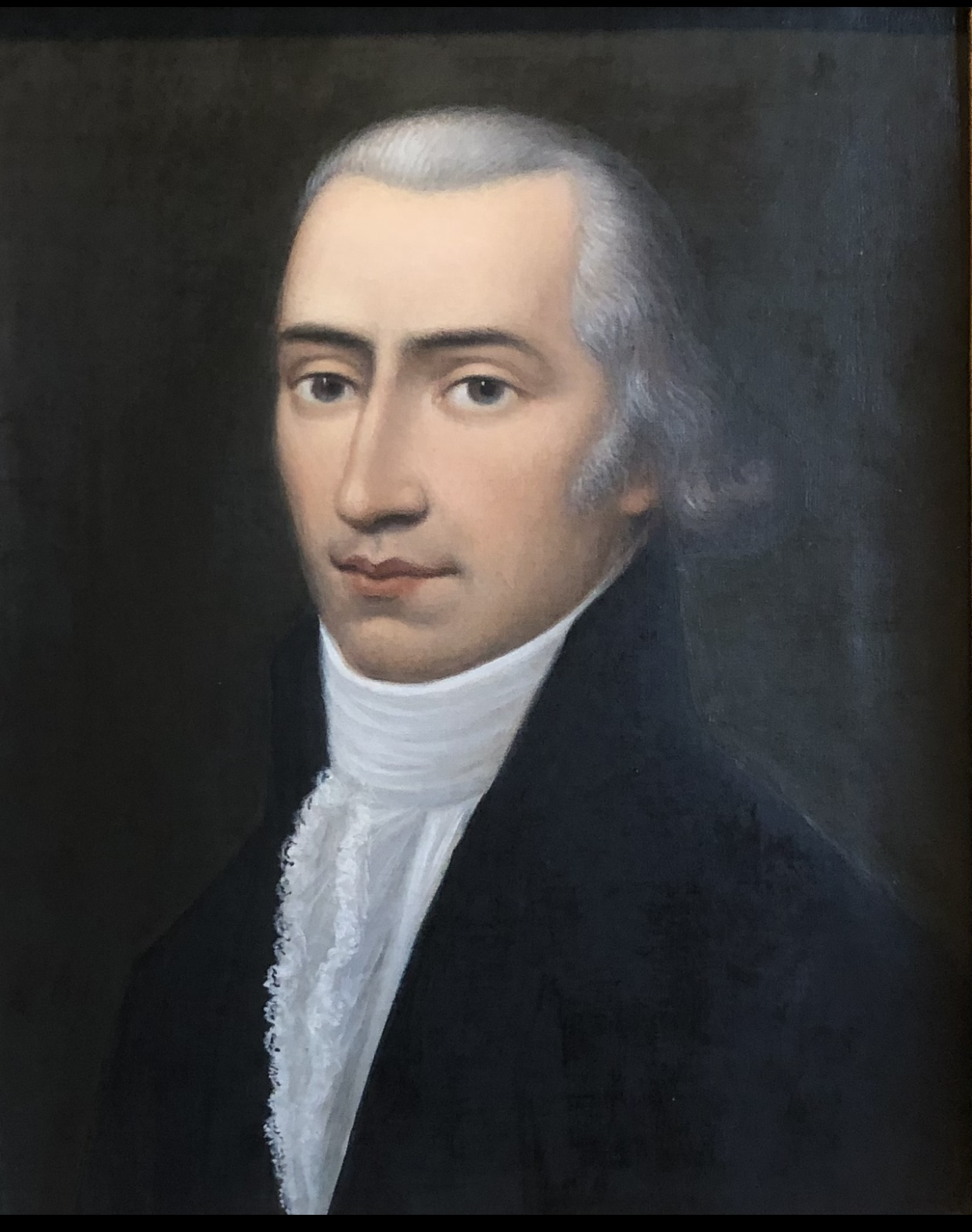
- Portrait of Leopardi
- Born: August 16, 1776; Recanati, Papal States
- Died: 30 April 1847 (aged 70); Recanati, Papal States
- Resting place: Chiesa di Santa Maria di Varano
- Spouse: Adelaide Antici (m. 1797)
- Children: 10
- Parent(s): Giacomo Leopardi and Virginia Leopardi (née Mosca)
- Family: Leopardi

Philosophical work
- Era: 18th-century philosophy
- Region: Western philosophy; Italian philosophy
- School: Traditionalist conservatism; Ultramontanism; Traditionalism; Clericalism; Counter-Enlightenment; Royalism; Monarchism
- Main interests: Politics; Society

Signature
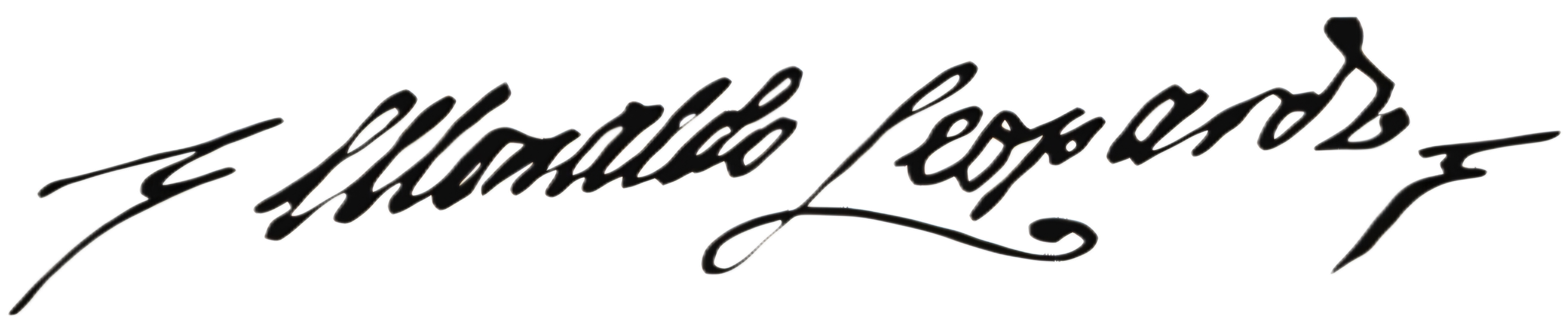

Count Monaldo Leopardi (Recanati, 16 August 1776 – Recanati, 30 April 1847) was an Italian philosopher, nobleman, politician and writer, notable as one of the main Italian intellectuals of the counter-revolution. His son, Giacomo Leopardi, was a poet and thinker with opposite views, which were likely the main cause of their discord.

== Biography ==
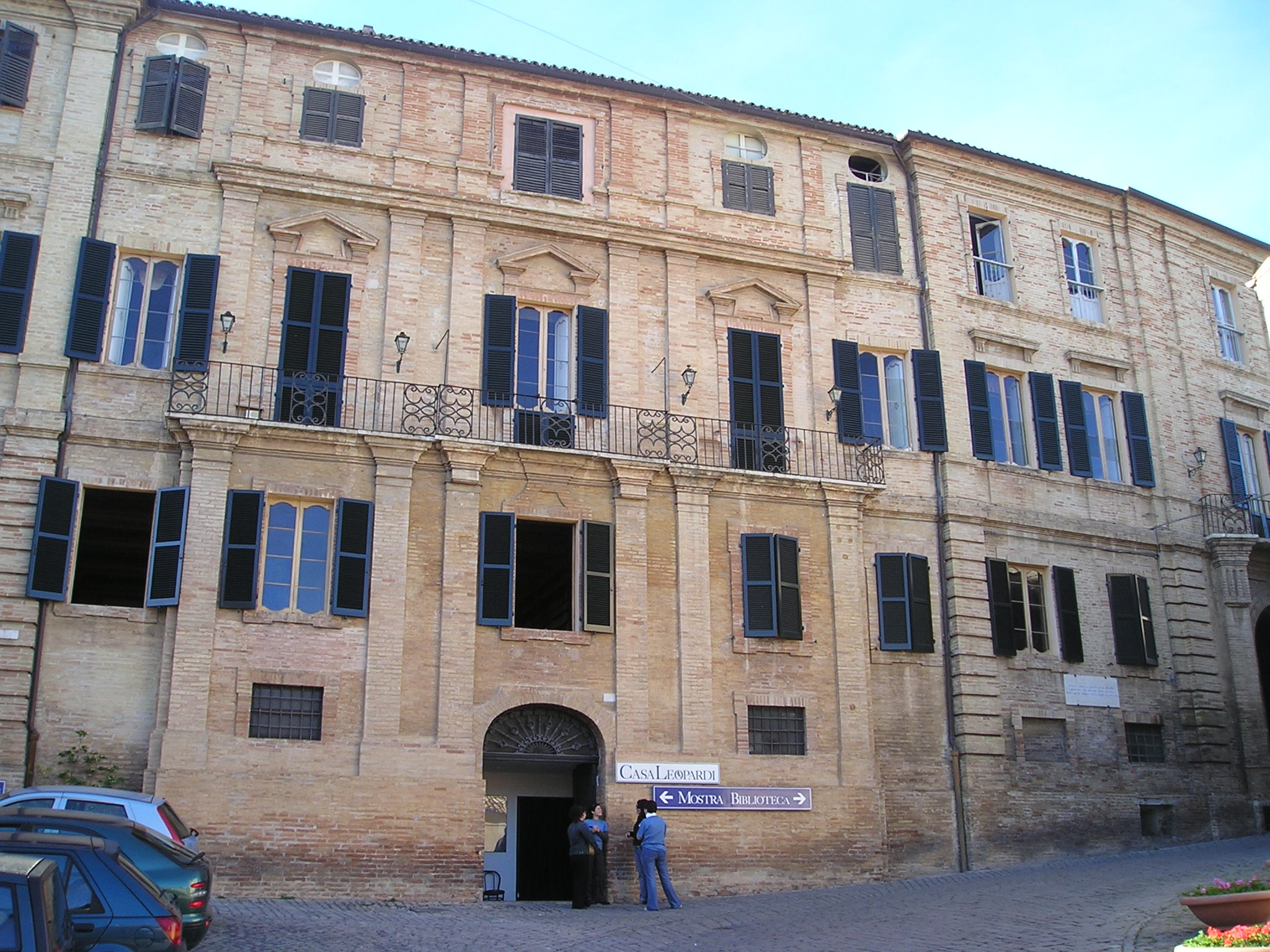
The Palazzo Leopardi in Recanati

Monaldo Leopardi was born in Recanati on 16 August 1776. For centuries his family had been among the leading landowners of the region, and closely connected with the Church (throughout Leopardi's lifetime Recanati was part of the Papal States). Monaldo lost his father before he was five years old, and spent the years of his childhood in the Palazzo Leopardi, with his mother, his brother and sister, and his great-uncle. His tutor, Father José Matías de Torres, was an exiled Jesuit from Veracruz, Mexico. As a child, Monaldo spent several months in Pesaro at the home of his grandmother, Francesca, who years later came to stay with him in his palace in Recanati. At the age of eighteen he assumed, as head of the family, the complete management of the whole family property. In 1797 Monaldo married a capable woman, Marquise Adelaide Antici, two years his junior, and daughter of a neighboring Recanatese family. At the time of their marriage, Monaldo was the largest landholder in Recanati.

In the spring of 1797 the French Republican troops had made their first invasion of the Papal States, and now the Pope—having failed in various efforts to conciliate the enemy—decided to fight against France. After the fall of Ancona, a regiment of Papal troops occupied Recanati, and began to prepare for its defence; but Monaldo succeeded in persuading its colonel that Recanati was indefensible, and that it would be better to take his troops away. During the next two years, a constant succession of troops—French, Papal, and Austrian—occupied the Marche. His indignation against the iniquities of the French Republican government was intense. The taxes imposed by it, he said in his Memoirs, were terrible—amounting, in his own case, to over twelve thousand scudi, besides a carriage, four horses, wood, oil, fodder, beds, sheets, and even clothes. He was deeply shocked, too, by the impiety of the Republicans: two of the churches of Recanati were turned into stables, the black robes of the priests were requisitioned, and the monks (as well as the rest of the population) were compelled to wear a cockade of France and to take their turn, still clothed in their monk's habits, in mounting guard at the city gates. This government was temporarily brought to an end in Recanati by the arrival of a large number of insurgents, who turned out the French, cut down the liberty pole they had erected in one of the city's squares, and elevated Monaldo himself, much against his will, to the position of governor of the city.

A few months later the tables were turned again. With the help of Austrian troops the Marche were being freed from the French domination, and in 1799 the Republican army, in its turn, was shut up in Ancona and besieged there. On 25 June 1800, the new Pope Pius VII, on his triumphant return from France to Rome, went to Loreto, and even paid a morning visit to Recanati. The little city was decked in its best; the sailors of the port of Recanati, halfway to Loreto, unharnessed the horses of the Papal carriage and themselves drew it up the hill to the cathedral, where a large congregation of reinstated monks and nuns and an exulting congregation of the faithful came to kiss the Pope's toe, Monaldo of course among them.

This year, however, was the last in which Count Monaldo played a conspicuous part in the affairs of his city. After the Battle of Marengo, the Papal States again fell into the power of France, and as long as this rule lasted, Monaldo remained in complete retirement. Monaldo was overwhelmed with financial problems: he speculated disastrously on the price of wheat and made an unfortunate attempt to redeem a part of the Roman Campagna, by introducing new agricultural methods there with disastrous results. The mere interest on his debts now amounted to a sum equal to the whole family income, so that ruin seemed both imminent and inevitable. Monaldo, continually pressed and harassed by his creditors, was at his wits' end, and his wife Adelaide assumed, once and for all, complete command. She summoned a family council, laid bare the whole situation, persuaded Monaldo to resign the management of the estate to an administrator, signed an agreement with his creditors, and herself became the undisputed mistress of the household. Monaldo never succeeded in regaining financial independence.

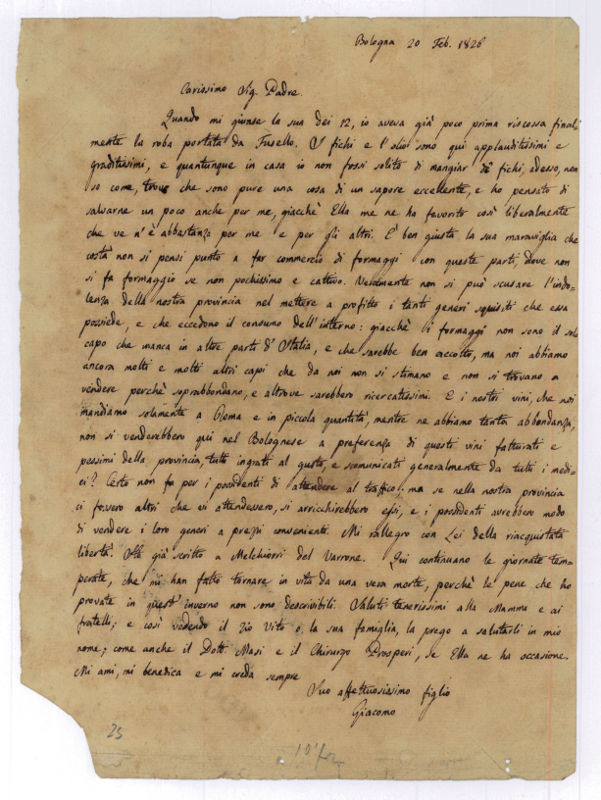
Letter written by Giacomo Leopardi to his father, Monaldo, on 20th February 1826

On learning of Edward Jenner's breakthrough in developing a vaccine against smallpox, Monaldo was one of the first in Recanati to have his children vaccinated and to recommend it to others. He was interested in new methods of reclaiming fallow land, and took a leading role in introducing potato cultivation in the Marche region. In 1812 Monaldo formally opened to the public the great library in his own house, which he had been preparing for the past ten years, hoping to upgrade the culture of his fellow citizens.

After the end of Napoleonic rule in Italy (1814), Monaldo resumed his political activity. He held the office of mayor of Recanati from 1816 to 1819, and from 1823 to 1826. As gonfalonier, Monaldo promoted the construction of a new theatre in Recanati (today Teatro Giuseppe Persiani). The construction, announced in a poster dated 8 February 1823, was entrusted to the local architect Tommaso Brandoni. Work commenced two months later, but various difficulties considerably delayed its continuation and it was not completed until seventeen years later, at a final cost of 13,223 scudos. It was inaugurated on the evening of 7 January 1840 with the opera Beatrice di Tenda by Vincenzo Bellini, on which occasion the theatre was dedicated to the town's renowned musician Giuseppe Persiani (1804-1869).

His relationship with his son Giacomo, of which we have testimony in the latter's Epistolario, was profound but suffered, as is inevitable in an encounter, albeit bound by reciprocal affection, between two diametrically opposed temperaments with a completely different conception of life. The 210 letters exchanged between Monaldo and his son from 1810 to 1837 - the year of the poet's death - allow the reader to reconstruct in detail the delicate and difficult relationship between the two. Of fundamental importance is the letter that Giacomo entrusted (at the end of July 1819) to his brother Carlo when he was preparing to run away from home and which Monaldo never saw because the attempt at «escape» was thwarted (the passport Giacomo had asked of the friend of the family, count Saverio Broglio, ended in Monaldo's hands). This letter is a precious document for understanding the heated protest of the twenty-one year old poet who rebels against his gloomy relegation to the loved-hated town of his birth without repudiating his sincere affection for his father – in fact asking to be excused for his painful choice firmly records his awareness of his greatness and his presentiment of his destiny («I had rather be unhappy than insignificant»).

Monaldo died in Recanati on 30 April 1847, at the age of 70. He was buried in the church of Santa Maria di Varano.

== Ideas ==
Monaldo Leopardi was heavily influenced by the conservative writers and philosophers Joseph de Maistre (1754–1821) and Louis de Bonald (1754–1840). He rejected the principles of liberalism and democracy and was persuaded that social order should reflect the disparities in intelligence and reason that existed in nature.

For Monaldo, legitimate government had nothing to do with elections or popular choice. Political authority was a Divine Right and sovereignty always belonged to the one (or the few) who had a de facto superiority reflecting the Providential plan. Monarchy was the best form of government, because it guaranteed better than any other the sacred laws of hierarchy and obedience to authority. Freedom should be curtailed for the sake of order and religious belief. At the end of the section of his autobiography that deals with his activities during the French occupation, he said this of himself: "One who is not cowardly can be free and indeed must be free, but the bases and limits of true freedom are the Faith of Jesus Christ, and faithfulness to the legitimate Sovereign. Outside of these boundaries one does not live freely, but dissolutely." His belief system demanded that absolute submission to the authority of both throne and altar be a universally accepted principle that, if violated, could only lead to a complete breakdown of order and responsibility.

Against the views of the Italian nationalists, Monaldo adopted both a Christian and a transcendental interpretation of motherland, (Heaven being the only true homeland to humankind), and one that was counter-revolutionary from a political perspective:

"the rebel is the exile from all homelands. Man's homeland is Heaven, and there is no homeland for the enemy of Heaven. He goes wandering about the earth, and cannot find a homeland on earth."

Christians are citizens of two homelands simultaneously: the heavenly and the earthly. For Monaldo the earthly homeland was first and foremost one's city, or at most the borders of one's country of origin. Thus he rejected the political meaning of Italian nation advanced by the Italian revolutionaries, and denounced its fictitious nature, based as it was on the imagination of a community that in reality did not exist. The revolutionaries in fact wanted to breach "those natural barriers that divide a people from another", and deprive "each particular people of their usages and national customs". Between the attachment to one's town and catholic universalism there was no space for the crucial role as intermediary Mazzini or Gioberti had attributed to the nations in reconciling individuals and humanity.

== Works ==
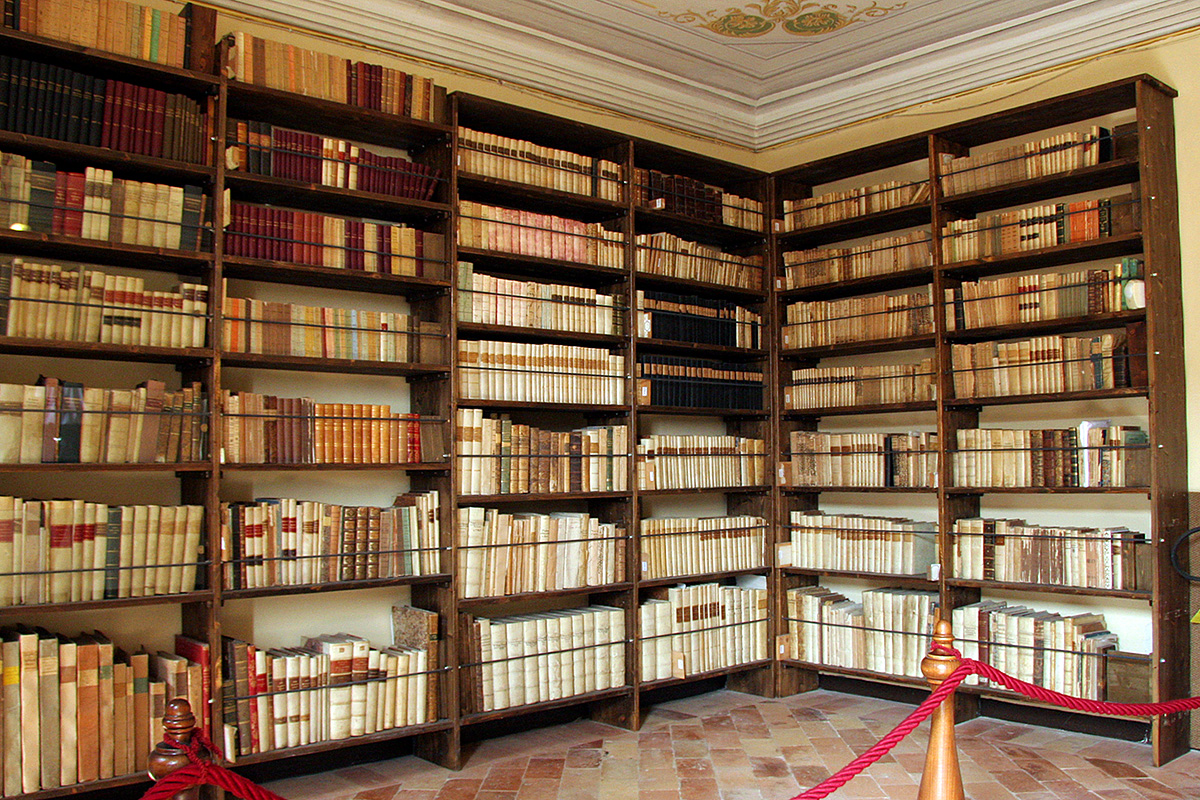
Library of Monaldo Leopardi in his house in Recanati

Monaldo Leopardi was a man of culture and learning. A poet in his youth, he later on became the author of many theological and political treatises, and revived in his native city a 'poetical Academy' which had previously existed there in 1400, under the name of 'I Disuguali Placidi'—literally, the Placidly Unequal, or those who can agree to disagree. Its meetings were held in the Palazzo Leopardi. Monaldo Leopardi had one of the most extensive private libraries in all of Europe. In his Will he laid down that the 15,000 volumes of which it was then composed (in 1847) should never be removed from the rooms in which he had placed them, and should be at the disposal of the citizens of Recanati for at least three mornings a week.

Among his most successful works were the Dialoghetti sulle materie correnti nell’anno 1831, a masterpiece of counterrevolutionary and anti-liberal satire, that went through six editions in three months and were translated into French, Dutch and German; the Istoria evangelica (1832), commended by Pope Gregory XVI (1831-1846) and translated into Spanish; Il Catechismo filosofico per uso delle scuole inferiori (1832), reprinted and adopted in the public schools of the Kingdom of the Two Sicilies; and La città della filosofia (1833). Le Conferenze del Villaggio (Lugano, Veladini e Comp., 1838) were translated into French by David Paul Drach, a close friend and admirer of Monaldo.

The Dialoghetti sulle materie correnti nell'anno 1831 were first published in 1831 and had considerable success in Italy and abroad. The book was highly praised by German historian Leopold von Ranke and by the young Vincenzo Gioacchino Pecci (1810-1903), the future Pope Leo XIII (1878-1903). Giacomo, too, was at first not indifferent to this success nor did it displease him to be mistaken for the author, and only when his liberal friends in Florence and elsewhere began to criticize the reactionary nature of the book did he publicly disclaim its authorship. In contrast, Monaldo's work was the object of severe criticism by liberal Catholics. In the August 1, 1834, issue of the Revue des deux Mondes, Félicité de La Mennais severely criticized the Dialoghetti in an article entitled “On Absolutism and Freedom.”

Monaldo was founder, manager, and editor of the newspaper La Voce della Ragione (The Voice of Reason), published from 1832 to 1835 and suppressed by order of the Roman Curia.

The Autobiografia di Monaldo Leopardi gives a vivid picture of the background of the Leopardi family, and a self-portrait of the author. It was published posthumously in 1883 but written in 1823, when the author was only 47 years old. The Autobiografia was reprinted in 1971 (Milan: Longanesi), and republished in 1972 in conformity with the original manuscript preserved in the family archives in Recanati. A number of letters and other unpublished writings by Monaldo Leopardi are preserved in the Vatican Apostolic Archive.

He had a long-time correspondence with several important Roman Catholic intellectuals of his time.

== List of works ==
- 1800: Le cose come sono.
- 1822: Notizie della zecca recanatese.
- 1824: Serie dei rettori della Marca anconetana.
- 1828: Serie dei Vescovi di Recanati.
- 1831: Dialoghetti sulle materie correnti nell'anno 1831.
- 1832: Prediche al popolo liberale recitate da don Musoduro.
- 1832: Testamento di don Pietro di Braganza, ex imperatore del Brasile.
- 1832: Un'oretta di conversazione tra sei illustri matrone della buona antichità.
- 1832: Sulle riforme del governo. Una parola ai sudditi del papa.
- 1832: Aggiunte alla sesta edizione dei Dialoghetti.
- 1832: Catechismo filosofico per uso delle scuole inferiori.
- 1832: La città della filosofia.
- 1834: La giustizia nei contratti e l'usura.
- 1883: Autobiografia.
