= List of compositions by James MacMillan =

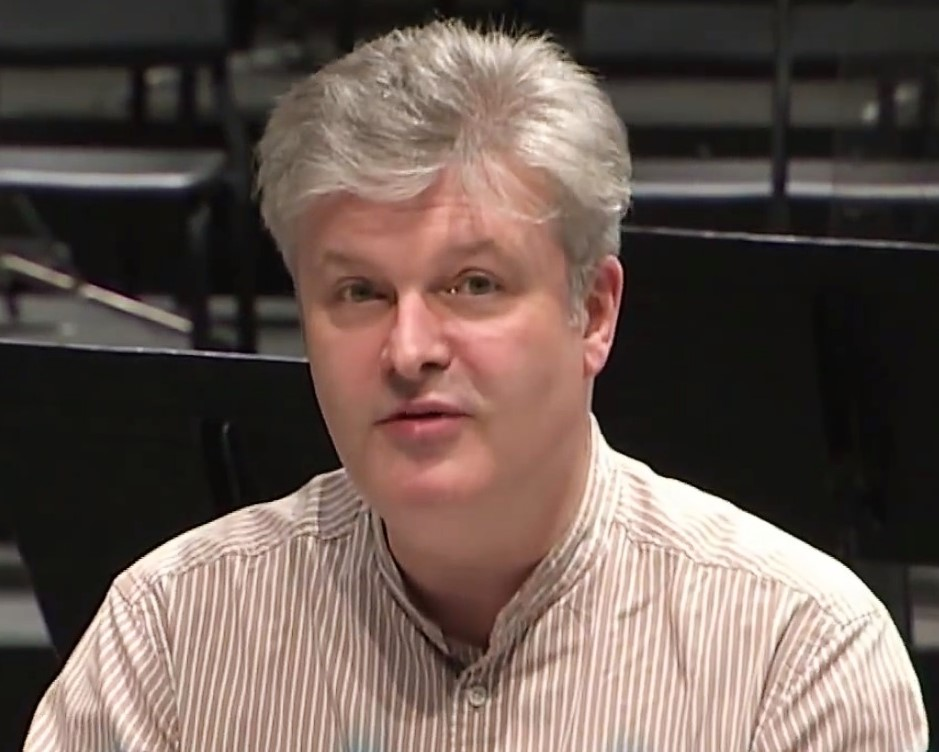
James MacMillan in 2012

This is a list of compositions by James MacMillan (born 1959), a Scottish composer of contemporary classical music. MacMillan's music is published by Boosey & Hawkes, and his diverse catalogue of music currently numbers over 200 works.

== Opera or music theatre ==
- Búsqueda (1988)
  - music theatre work, setting texts from the Latin Mass and poems by the Argentinian Mothers of the Disappeared, translated by Gilbert Markus; premiered on 6 December 1988 at Queen's Hall, Edinburgh, by ECAT Ensemble under the baton of the composer.
- Inés de Castro (1990–1995)
  - opera in two acts; libretto after the play Inés de Castro by John Clifford; premiered by Scottish Opera on 23 August 1996 as part of the Edinburgh International Festival.
- Visitatio Sepulchri (1992–93)
  - music theatre work, setting texts from a 14th-century Easter Day liturgical drama and the Te Deum; premiered on 20 May 1993 by Scottish Chamber Orchestra directed by Francisco Negrin and conducted by Ivor Bolton at Glasgow's Tramway.
- Parthenogenesis (2000)
  - scena, libretto by Michael Symmons Roberts; premiered on 12 September 2000 at Cambridge Corn Exchange by Britten Sinfonia, conducted by the composer.
- The Sacrifice (2005–06)
  - opera in three acts; libretto by Michael Symmons Roberts, based on a story from the Mabinogion; premiered on 22 September 2007 at the Wales Millennium Centre by Welsh National Opera, directed by Katie Mitchell and conducted by the composer.
- Clemency (2009–10)
  - opera for five singers and string orchestra; text by anonymous and Michael Symmons Roberts; a co-production between ROH2 and Scottish Opera; premiered on 6 May 2011 at the Royal Opera House by the Britten Sinfonia, directed by Katie Mitchell and conducted by the composer.

== Orchestral ==
- Into the Ferment (1988), for solo concertante group and orchestra
  - commissioned by the Scottish Chamber Orchestra and the Ayr Schools Symphony Orchestra, who jointly premièred the work under the composer at the Magnum Centre, Irvine on 19 December 1988.
- Cantos Sagrados (1989, orch.1997), for S.A.T.B. (Soprano, Alto, Tenor and Bass) choir and orchestra
  - version premièred by Royal Scottish National Orchestra and Chorus under Christopher Bell at Glasgow Cathedral on 21 February 1998.
- Tryst (1989), for chamber orchestra
  - commissioned by the Scottish Chamber Orchestra, who premièred the work under Paul Daniel at the St Magnus Festival, Kirkwall, Orkney on 17 June 1989.
- The Berserking (1990), concerto for piano and orchestra
  - commissioned by the Musica Nova Festival; premièred by pianist Peter Donohoe with the Royal Scottish National Orchestra under Matthias Bamert in Glasgow on 22 September 1990.
- The Confession of Isobel Gowdie (1990)
  - commissioned by the BBC Proms; premièred by the BBC Scottish Symphony Orchestra under Jerzy Maksymiuk at the Royal Albert Hall, London on 22 August 1990.
- Sinfonietta (1991), for chamber orchestra
  - commissioned by the London Sinfonietta, who premièred the work under Martyn Brabbins at the Queen Elizabeth Hall, Southbank Centre, London on 14 May 1991.
- Tuireadh (1991, arr.1995), for clarinet and string orchestra
  - version written for the Gdańsk Philharmonic Orchestra, who premièred the work with clarinet soloist Karol Respondek under the composer at the Filharmonia Baltycka, Gdańsk on 24 November 1995. It was written in dedication to the victims of the Piper Alpha offshore oil platform disaster.
- Veni, Veni, Emmanuel (1992), concerto for percussion and orchestra
  - commissioned by Christian Salvesen PLC for the Scottish Chamber Orchestra; premièred by percussionist Evelyn Glennie with the Scottish Chamber Orchestra under Jukka-Pekka Saraste at the BBC Proms, Royal Albert Hall, London on 10 August 1992.
- Epiclesis (1993, rev.1998), concerto for trumpet and orchestra
  - written for trumpeter John Wallace, who gave the work's première with the Philharmonia Orchestra under Leonard Slatkin at Usher Hall, Edinburgh on 28 August 1993 as part of the Edinburgh International Festival.
- Kiss on Wood (1993, arr. 2008), for cello and string orchestra
  - version written for cellist Natalie Clein, who gave the first performance with the Chamber Orchestra of Europe under Mark Gottoni at St. Andrew's Hall, Norwich on 14 May 2008.
- Memoire imperiale (1993), for chamber orchestra
  - commissioned by the University of Edinburgh Music Faculty; premièred by the Scottish Chamber Orchestra under Matthias Bamert at the University of Edinburgh on 13 February 1994.
- Seven Last Words from the Cross (1993), cantata for S.S.A.A.T.T.B.B. choir and string orchestra
  - commissioned by BBC Television; premièred as seven nightly broadcasts during Holy Week 1994, performed by Cappella Nova, Scottish Ensemble under Alan Tavener.
- Britannia (1994)
  - commissioned by British Telecommunications and the Association of British Orchestras; premièred by the London Symphony Orchestra under Michael Tilson Thomas at the Barbican Centre, London on 21 September 1994.
- The World's Ransoming (1995–96), concerto for cor anglais and orchestra
  - Part 1 of orchestral triptych Triduum
    - commissioned by the London Symphony Orchestra; premièred by Christine Pendrill (cor anglais soloist) with the London Symphony Orchestra under Kent Nagano at the Barbican Centre, London on 11 July 1996.
- Cello Concerto (1996), for cello and orchestra
  - Part 2 of orchestral triptych Triduum
    - commissioned by the London Symphony Orchestra; premièred by cellist Mstislav Rostropovich (to whom the work is dedicated) with the London Symphony Orchestra under Sir Colin Davis at the Barbican Centre, London on 3 November 1996.
- Í (A Meditation on Iona) (1996), for string orchestra and percussion
  - premièred by the Scottish Chamber Orchestra under Joseph Swensen at City Halls, Glasgow on 21 February 1997.
- Ninian (1996), concerto for clarinet and orchestra
  - written for clarinettist John Cushing, who premièred the work with Royal Scottish National Orchestra under Paul Daniel at Usher Hall, Edinburgh on 4 April 1997.
- Symphony – Vigil (1997)
  - Part 3 of orchestral triptych Triduum
    - commissioned by the London Symphony Orchestra, who premièred the work under Mstislav Rostropovich at the Barbican Centre on 28 September 1997.
- Exsultet (1998, arr.2000), for orchestral brass and percussion
  - version premièred by the BBC Philharmonic under the composer at Bridgewater Hall, Manchester on 30 September 2000.
- Quickening (1998), for counter-tenor, two tenor and baritone soli, children's choir, S.A.T.B. choir and orchestra
  - co-commissioned by the BBC Proms and the Philadelphia Orchestra; premièred by the Hilliard Ensemble, the Westminster Cathedral Boys' Choir, the BBC Symphony Chorus, and the BBC Symphony Orchestra under Sir Andrew Davis at the Royal Albert Hall, London on 5 September 1999.
- Cumnock Fair (1999), for string orchestra or piano and string orchestra
  - commissioned by Cumnock Music Club for its Golden Jubilee Concert; premièred by members of the Scottish Chamber Orchestra at Cumnock Academy, Ayrshire on 23 February 1999.
- Magnificat (1999), for S.A.T.B. choir and orchestra
  - version first performed by the Wells Cathedral Choir, the St. John's College Choir, and the BBC Philharmonic under the composer at Wells Cathedral, Wells on 5 January 2000.
- Symphony No. 2 (1999), for chamber orchestra
  - written for the Scottish Chamber Orchestra, who premièred the work under the composer at Ayr Town Hall on 2 December 1999.
- The Birds of Rhiannon (2001), tone-poem for orchestra and optional S.A.T.B. choir
  - commissioned by the BBC Proms; first performed by The Sixteen and the BBC Philharmonic under the composer at the Royal Albert Hall, London on 26 July 2001.
- Nunc Dimittis (2001), for S.A.T.B. choir and orchestra
  - version first performed by the BBC Singers and the BBC Philharmonic under the composer at Bridgewater Hall, Manchester on 16 November 2001.
- A Deep but Dazzling Darkness (2001–02), concerto for violin, chamber orchestra and tape
  - co-commissioned by LSO St Luke's and the Saratoga Chamber Music Festival; premièred by violinist Gordan Nikolitch with the London Symphony Orchestra under the composer at LSO St Luke's, London on 27 March 2003.
- Symphony No. 3 Silence (2002)
  - premièred by the NHK Symphony Orchestra under Charles Dutoit at NHK Hall, Tokyo on 17 April 2003.
- Piano Concerto No. 2 (2003), for piano and string orchestra
  - commissioned by the New York City Ballet, first performed under the direction of the composer at Lincoln Center, New York on 8 May 2004.
- A Scotch Bestiary (2003–04), concerto for organ and orchestra
  - co-commissioned by the Los Angeles Philharmonic and the BBC for the BBC Philharmonic; premièred by organist Wayne Marshall with the Los Angeles Philharmonic under Esa-Pekka Salonen in Disney Hall, Los Angeles, California on 7 October 2004.
- From Ayrshire (2005), for violin and chamber orchestra
  - written for violinist Nicola Benedetti, who premièred the work with the Dayton Philharmonic under Carlos Miguel Prieto at the Schuster Center, Dayton, Ohio on 23 March 2007.
- The Sacrifice: Three Interludes (2005–06)
  - interludes from MacMillan's opera The Sacrifice
    - premièred by the BBC Philharmonic under the composer's direction at Bridgewater Hall, Manchester on 22 February 2008.
- Stomp (with Fate and Elvira) (2006)
  - commissioned by the London Symphony Orchestra, who premièred the work under Sir Colin Davis at the Barbican Centre on 3 March 2007.
- St. John Passion (2007), for baritone solo, S.A.T.B. choir and orchestra
  - dedicated to Sir Colin Davis on the occasion of his 80th birthday. Co-commissioned by the London Symphony Orchestra and the Boston Symphony; premièred by the London Symphony Orchestra and Chorus with baritone Christopher Maltman under Sir Colin Davis at the Barbican Centre, London on 17 April 2008.
- Piano Concerto No. 3, "The Mysteries of Light" (2007–08), for piano and orchestra
  - commissioned by the Minnesota Orchestra, who gave the work's première with pianist Jean-Yves Thibaudet under Osmo Vänskä at Orchestra Hall, Minneapolis, Minnesota, on 14 April 2011.
- Violin Concerto No. 1 (2009), for violin and orchestra
  - written for violinist Vadim Repin (to whom the work is dedicated); co-commissioned by the London Symphony Orchestra, the Zaterdagmatinee (Amsterdam), the Philadelphia Orchestra and the Ensemble Orchestral de Paris. The world première was given by Repin and the London Symphony Orchestra under Valery Gergiev at the Barbican Centre on 12 May 2010.
- Larghetto for Orchestra (2009, orch. 2017)
  - orchestral transcription of the a cappella choral piece Miserere (2009), made to commemorate the tenth anniversary of Manfred Honeck's tenure as conductor of the Pittsburgh Symphony Orchestra.
- Violin Concerto (2009), for violin and orchestra
- Oboe Concerto (2009–10), for oboe and chamber orchestra
  - co-commissioned by the Britten Sinfonia and Birmingham Town Hall; première was given by oboist Nicholas Daniel with the Britten Sinfonia under the composer at Birmingham Town Hall, Birmingham on 15 October 2010.
- Seraph (2010), for trumpet and string orchestra
  - première was given by Alison Balsom with the Scottish Ensemble at Wigmore Hall, London on 17 February 2011.
- St Luke Passion (2013), for S.A.T.B. chorus, children's choir, organ and chamber orchestra
  - première was given at the Royal Concertgebouw by the Netherlands Radio Philharmonic Orchestra, Netherlands Radio Choir, Vocaal Talent Nederland and National Jeugdkoor under Markus Stenz on 15 March 2014.
- Viola Concerto (2013)
  - première was given at the Royal Festival Hall by the violist Lawrence Power and the London Philharmonic Orchestra under Vladimir Jurowski on 15 January 2014.
- Symphony No. 4 (2014–15)
  - premièred by the BBC Scottish Symphony Orchestra under Donald Runnicles at the Royal Albert Hall, London on 3 August 2015.
- Trombone Concerto (2016)
  - premièred by the Royal Concertgebouw Orchestra with Jörgen van Rijen conducted by Iván Fischer at the Concertgebouw, Amsterdam on 20 April 2017.
- Saxophone Concerto (2017)
  - co-commissioned by Perth Concert Hall, the Adelaide Symphony Orchestra and the Aurora Orchestra; premiered on 11 April 2018 at Perth Concert Hall by Scottish Chamber Orchestra and Amy Dickson, conducted by Joseph Swensen.
- Her tears fell with the dews at even (2020)
  - commissioned by the Pittsburgh Symphony Orchestra, which gave the work its premiere under Manfred Honeck on 17 March 2023 at Heinz Hall, Pittsburgh.
- Violin Concerto No. 2 (2021)
  - co-commissioned by the Dallas Symphony Orchestra, the Scottish Chamber Orchestra, the Swedish Chamber Orchestra, and the Adam Mickiewicz Institute; premiered on 28 September 2022 at Perth Concert Hall by Scottish Chamber Orchestra and Nicola Benedetti, conducted by Maxim Emelyanychev.

== Band ==
- Sowetan Spring (1990), for wind band
  - commissioned by the British Association of Symphonic Bands and Wind Ensembles. Premièred by the Winds of the Royal Scottish National Orchestra, conducted by John Paynter, on 23 September 1990.

== Choral ==
- Missa Brevis (1977), for a cappella S.A.T.B. choir
  - written when the composer was aged 17; first complete performance was given by Cappella Nova under Alan Tavener on 22 November 2007.
- The Lamb has come for us from the House of David (1979), for S.A.T.B. choir and organ
  - first performed by the Schola Sancti Alberti directed by the composer at St. Peter's, Edinburgh on 9 June 1979.
- On Love (1984), for solo voice or unison trebles and organ
  - premièred by Barbara L Kelly with the composer accompanying at the Chapel of St Albert the Great, Edinburgh on 18 August 1984.
- St. Anne's Mass (1985), for unison voices and piano or organ with optional S.A.T.B. choir
  - congregational mass, setting movements from the Catholic Mass
- Cantos Sagrados (1989), for S.A.T.B. choir and organ
  - commissioned by the Scottish Arts Council for the Scottish Chamber Choir, who gave the work's première under Colin Tipple at Old St Paul's Church, Edinburgh on 10 February 1990.
- Cantos Sagrados (1989, orch.1997), for S.A.T.B. choir and orchestra
  - version premièred by Royal Scottish National Orchestra and Chorus under Christopher Bell at Glasgow Cathedral on 21 February 1998.
- Catherine's Lullabies (1990), for S.A.T.B. choir, brass sextet and percussion
  - first performed by the John Currie Singers in Glasgow on 10 February 1991.
- Divo Aloysio Sacrum (1991), for S.A.T.B. choir and optional organ
  - first performed by the Royal Scottish National Choir and the Edinburgh Festival Ensemble directed by Christopher Bell at St. Giles Cathedral, Edinburgh on 27 August 1993 as part of the Edinburgh International Festival.
- So Deep (1992), for S.S.A.A.T.T.B.B. choir with optional oboe and viola solos
  - arrangement of O my luve's like a red, red rose by Robert Burns (who wrote both the words and melody)
- ...here in hiding... (1993), for four male voices or unaccompanied choir
  - commissioned by the Hilliard Ensemble, who gave the première at the Royal Scottish Academy of Music and Drama, Glasgow on 10 August 1993.
- Seven Last Words from the Cross (1993), cantata for S.S.A.A.T.T.B.B. choir and string orchestra
  - commissioned by BBC Television; premièred as seven nightly broadcasts during Holy Week 1994, performed by Cappella Nova, Scottish Ensemble under Alan Tavener.
- Christus Vincit (1994), for soprano solo and a cappella S.S.A.A.T.T.B.B. choir
  - premièred by combined choirs from Westminster Abbey, Westminster Cathedral and St Paul's Cathedral directed by John Scott at St Paul's Cathedral, London on 23 November 1994.
- Màiri (1995), for unaccompanied 16-part choir
  - commissioned by the BBC; premièred by the BBC Singers directed by Bo Holten at St John's, Smith Square, London on 19 May 1995.
- Seinte Mari moder milde (1995), for S.A.T.B. choir and organ
  - commissioned by King's College, Cambridge; premièred by the choir of King's College directed by Stephen Cleobury in Cambridge on 24 December 1995.
- A Child's Prayer (1996), for a cappella S.A.T.B. choir with two treble/soprano soloists
  - first performed by the choir of Westminster Abbey directed by Martin Neary in Westminster, London on 4 July 1996.
- The Galloway Mass (1996), for cantor, congregation, choir and organ
  - first performed by the congregation of Good Shepherd Cathedral, Ayr on 25 March 1997.
- The Halie Speerit's Dauncers (1996), for unison children's choir and piano
  - written as a gift for the Corpus Christi Primary School, Glasgow, where it was first performed on 28 April 1997.
- On the Annunciation of the Blessed Virgin (1996), for S.A.T.B. choir and organ
  - first performed by the choir of Gonville and Caius College, Cambridge under the direction of Geoffrey Webber with Andrew Arthur (organ) at Caius Chapel, Cambridge on 27 April 1997.
- Changed (1997), for S.A.T.B. mixed choir with organ, harp string trio or similar
  - first performed by the Cunninghame Choir and members of the North Ayrshire Youth Band directed by Dorothy Howden at Walker Hall, Kilbirnie, Ayrshire on 12 December 1998.
- The Gallant Weaver (1997), for a cappella S.A.T.B. choir
  - premièred by Paisley Abbey Choir under the direction of George McPhee at the Thomas Coats Memorial Church, Paisley on 14 April 1997.
- A New Song (1997), for S.A.T.B. choir and organ
  - written for the choir of St Bride's Church, Glasgow, who gave the first performance directed by Robert Marshall with Peter Christie (organ) on 1 March 1998.
- The Prophecy (1997), for two-part school choir and instrumental ensemble
  - premièred by children from the Haringey Schools and members of The Philharmonia directed by Nicholas Wilks, John Cooney and the composer at the Queen Elizabeth Hall, Southbank Centre, London on 11 October 1997.
- Quickening (1998), for counter-tenor, two tenor and baritone soli, children's choir, S.A.T.B. choir and orchestra
  - co-commissioned by the BBC Proms and the Philadelphia Orchestra; premièred by the Hilliard Ensemble, the Westminster Cathedral Boys' Choir, the BBC Symphony Chorus, and the BBC Symphony Orchestra under Sir Andrew Davis at the Royal Albert Hall, London on 5 September 1999.
- Heyoka Te Deum (1999), for three-part treble voices, flute, tubular bells and piano
  - written for the Brooklyn Youth Chorus, who gave the work's première under the direction of Dianne Berkon in New York on 3 May 2001.
- Magnificat (1999), for S.A.T.B. choir and organ
  - commissioned by the BBC for the first choral evensong of the Millennium. It was premièred by the choir of Winchester Cathedral under David Hill at Winchester Cathedral on 15 July 2000.
- Magnificat (1999), for S.A.T.B. choir and orchestra
  - version first performed by the Wells Cathedral Choir, the St. John's College Choir, and the BBC Philharmonic under the composer at Wells Cathedral, Wells on 5 January 2000.
- The Company of Heaven (1999), for two-part children's choir and organ, with optional wind band & carnyx
  - commissioned by Partick 2000, a grouping of churches and community organisations in the Partick area of Glasgow, to celebrate the Millennium.
- Mass (2000), for S.A.T.B. choir and organ
  - commissioned by Westminster Cathedral for the Millennium; premièred by the choir of Westminster Cathedral directed by Martin Baker with Andrew Reid (organ) at Westminster Cathedral, London on 22 June 2000.
- The Birds of Rhiannon (2001), tone poem for orchestra with optional S.A.T.B. choir
  - commissioned by the BBC Proms; first performed by The Sixteen and the BBC Philharmonic under the composer at the Royal Albert Hall, London on 26 July 2001.
- Nunc Dimittis (2000), for S.A.T.B. choir and organ
  - commissioned by Winchester Cathedral; premièred by the choir of Winchester Cathedral directed by David Hill with Philip Scriven (organ) in Winchester on 15 July 2000.
- Dutch Carol (2001), for unison treble voices and piano
  - sets a traditional Dutch Christmas text, in a translation from the Oxford Book of Carols.
- Nunc Dimittis (2001), for S.A.T.B. choir and orchestra
  - version first performed by the BBC Singers and the BBC Philharmonic under the composer at Bridgewater Hall, Manchester on 16 November 2001.
- Te Deum (2001), for S.A.T.B. choir and organ
  - written for the choir of the Chapel Royal, HM Tower of London, who gave the work's première directed by Stephen Tilton at the Tower of London on 3 February 2002.
- Tremunt videntes angeli (2001), for a cappella S.A.T.B. choir
  - commissioned by Sir Eduardo Paolozzi in the Resurrection Chapel of St. Mary's Episcopal Cathedral, Edinburgh. Premièred by the Choir of St. Mary's Cathedral directed by Matthew Owens in St. Mary's Episcopal Cathedral, Edinburgh on 9 May 2002.
- O bone Jesu (2002), for a cappella mixed choir
  - commissioned by The Sixteen, who premièred the work directed by Harry Christophers at Southwark Cathedral, London on 10 October 2002.
- To My Successor (2002), for a cappella S.A.T.B. choir
  - setting of a text by George Herbert, written for the enthronement of Dr. Rowan Williams as Archbishop of Canterbury. Premièred by the Choir of Canterbury Cathedral under the direction of David Flood (organist) at Canterbury Cathedral, Canterbury on 27 February 2003.
- Chosen (2003), for S.A.A.T.T.B. choir and organ
  - premièred by the choir of Paisley Abbey directed by [George McPhee] with Oliver Rundell (organ) in Glasgow on 24 December 2003.
- Give me justice (2003), for a cappella S.A.T.B. choir
  - introit for the 5th Sunday of Lent
- Give me justice, O God (2004), for unaccompanied voices
  - chant – introit
- Gospel Acclamation (2004), for unaccompanied voices
  - chant
- Laudi alla Vergine Maria (2004), for a cappella S.S.A.A.T.T.B.B. choir
  - premièred by the Netherlands Chamber Choir directed by Stephen Layton at St Janskerk, Gouda on 6 October 2004.
- The Lord is my life and my help (2004), for unaccompanied unison voices
  - chant – introit
- Remember your mercies, Lord (2004), for unaccompanied voices
  - Entrance Antiphon – chant
- Bless the Lord, my soul (2005), for S.A.T.B. choir
  - responsorial psalm
- Nemo te condemnavit (2005), for a cappella S.A.T.B. choir
  - commissioned by the Yale Glee Club, who gave the work's première under the direction of Jeffrey Douma at Yale University, New Haven, Connecticut on 18 November 2005.
- Out of the depths (2005), for S.A.T.B. choir
  - responsorial psalm
- The Spirit of the Lord fills the whole world (2005), for S.A.T.B. choir
  - Entrance Antiphon
- The Strathclyde Motets – Factus est repente (2005), for a cappella S.A.T.B. choir
  - Communion motet for Pentecost. Gifted to the University of Strathclyde Chaplaincy; premièred by Strathclyde University Chamber Choir directed by Alan Tavener in Glasgow on 15 May 2005.
- The Strathclyde Motets – In splendoribus sanctorum (2005), for S.A.T.B. choir and obbligato trumpet or organ
  - Communion motet for Nativity Midnight Mass. Gifted to the University of Strathclyde Chaplaincy; premièred by the choir of St Columba's RC Parish Church, Glasgow on 24 December 2005.
- The Strathclyde Motets – Sedebit Dominus Rex (2005), for a cappella S.A.T.B. choir
  - Communion motet for the Feast of Christ the King. Gifted to the University of Strathclyde Chaplaincy; premièred by the Strathclyde University Chamber Choir under the direction of Alan Tavener in Glasgow on 20 November 2005.
- The Strathclyde Motets – Videns Dominus (2005), for a cappella S.A.T.B. choir
  - Communion motet for the 5th Sunday in Lent. Gifted to the University of Strathclyde Chaplaincy; premièred by the Strathclyde University Chamber Choir directed by Alan Tavener in Glasgow on 13 March 2005.
- When he calls to me, I will answer (2005), for unaccompanied choir
  - Entrance antiphon – chant
- After Virtue (2006), for a cappella S.S.A.A.T.B.B. choir
  - commissioned by the Oslo International Church Music Festival; premièred by the Oslo Soloists Choir directed by Grete Pedersen in Oslo on 18 March 2007.
- Invocation (2006), for a cappella S.A.T.B. double choir
  - written for the Oriel Singers, who gave the work's first performance directed by Tim Morris in Tewkesbury Abbey on 11 July 2006.
- Let the sons of Israel say (2006), for S.A.T.B. choir
  - responsorial psalm
- O Lord, you had just cause (2006), for S.A.T.B. choir
  - Entrance Antiphon – chant
- The Strathclyde Motets – Dominus dabit benignitatem (2006), for a cappella S.A.T.B. choir
  - communion motet for the 1st Sunday in Advent. Gifted to the University of Strathclyde Chaplaincy; premièred by the Strathclyde University Chamber Choir directed by Alan Tavener at St Columba's RC Parish Church, Glasgow on 3 December 2006.
- The Strathclyde Motets – Mitte manum tuam (2006), for a cappella S.A.T.B. choir
  - Communion motet for 2nd Sunday of Easter. Gifted to the University of Strathclyde Chaplaincy; premièred by the Strathclyde University Chamber Choir directed by Alan Tavener on 23 April 2006.
- Success (2006), for a cappella S.A.T.B. choir
  - brief setting of words by Bessie Stanley; work written as a tribute to Helen Millar on the occasion of her 75th birthday.
- Sun-Dogs (2006), for a cappella S.A.T.B. choir (with multiple divisi)
  - commissioned by Indiana University; premièred by the Indiana University Contemporary Vocal Ensemble directed by Carmen Téllez at Auer Hall, Indiana University in Bloomington, Indiana on 6 August 2006.
- Tenebrae Responsories (2006), for a cappella S.S.A.A.T.T.B.B. vocal ensemble
  - commissioned by Cappella Nova, who premièred the work under the direction of Alan Tavener at St Andrew's in the Square, Glasgow on 4 April 2007.
- ...fiat mihi... (2007), for a cappella S.S.A.A.T.T.B.B. choir
  - written for the Bath Camerata, who gave the work's première under Nigel Perrin at Wells Cathedral, Wells on 21 March 2008.
- Our Father, Doxology, Acclamation and Great Amen (2007), for unison voices and organ
- St. John Passion (2007), for baritone solo, S.A.T.B. choir and orchestra
  - dedicated to Sir Colin Davis on the occasion of his 80th birthday. Co-commissioned by the London Symphony Orchestra and the Boston Symphony; premièred by the London Symphony Orchestra and Chorus with baritone Christopher Maltman under Sir Colin Davis at the Barbican Centre, London on 17 April 2008.
- The Strathclyde Motets – The Canticle of Zachariah (2007), for a cappella S.A.T.B. choir
  - Gifted to the University of Strathclyde Chaplaincy; premièred by the Strathclyde University Chamber Choir directed by Alan Tavener at St Columba's RC Parish Church, Glasgow on 2 December 2007.
- The Strathclyde Motets – O Radiant Dawn (2007), for a cappella S.A.T.B. choir
  - Advent antiphon. Gifted to the University of Strathclyde Chaplaincy; premièred by the choir of St Columba's RC Parish Church, Glasgow on 2 December 2007.
- The Strathclyde Motets – Data est mihi omnis potestas (2007), for a cappella S.A.T.B. choir
  - Communion motet for Ascension Day. Gifted to the University of Strathclyde Chaplaincy; premièred by the Strathclyde University Chamber Choir directed by Alan Tavener at St Columba's RC Parish Church, Glasgow on 14 May 2007.
- O (2008), for three-part treble choir, trumpet and string orchestra or organ
  - premièred by students of the St. Mary's Music School in Queen's Hall, Edinburgh on 23 June 2008.
- And lo, the Angel of the Lord came upon them (2009), for three mixed-voiced choirs a cappella
  - commissioned by Ex Cathedra, who gave the work's première under the direction of Jeffrey Skidmore at St Paul's Church, Birmingham on 19 December 2009.
- Padre Pio's Prayer (2008), for S.A.T.B. choir and organ
  - commissioned by The Sixteen, who premièred the work under the direction of Harry Christophers at Westminster Cathedral, London on 3 June 2008.
- The Song of the Lamb (2008), for S.A.T.B. choir and organ
  - commissioned by The House of Hope Presbyterian Church, Minnesota; premièred by the choir of The House of Hope Presbyterian Church directed by Andrew Altenbach with Nancy Lancaster (organ) in St. Paul, Minnesota on 9 March 2008.
- The Strathclyde Motets – Pascha nostrum imolatus est (2008), for a cappella S.A.T.B. choir
  - communion motet for Easter Day. Gifted to the University of Strathclyde Chaplaincy, and premièred by the Strathclyde University Chamber Choir directed by Alan Tavener at St Columba's RC Parish Church, Glasgow on 23 March 2008.
- The Strathclyde Motets – Os mutorum (2008), for two-part women's choir and medieval harp
  - Gifted to the University of Strathclyde Chaplaincy; premièred by Canty at St Columba's RC Parish Church, Glasgow on 22 June 2008.
- The Strathclyde Motets – Lux Aeterna (2008), for a cappella S.A.T.B. choir
  - Gifted to the University of Strathclyde Chaplaincy; premièred by the Strathclyde University Chamber Choir directed by Alan Tavener at St Columba's RC Parish Church, Glasgow on 2 November 2008.
- Benedictus Deus (2009), for a cappella S.A.T.B. choir
  - commissioned by Westminster Cathedral; first performed by Westminster Cathedral Choir directed by Martin Baker at Westminster Cathedral, London on 21 May 2009.
- Bring us, O Lord God (2009), for a cappella S.A.T.B. choir
  - commissioned by Schola Cantorum of Oxford, who gave the first performance under the direction of James Burton at the Sheldonian Theatre, Oxford on 1 May 2010.
- Jubilate Deo (2009), for S.A.T.B. choir and organ
  - premièred by the choir of Wells Cathedral under the direction of Matthew Owens with Jonathan Vaughn (organ) at Wells Cathedral on 17 May 2009.
- Miserere (2009), for a cappella mixed choir
  - commissioned by The Sixteen, who gave the première under Harry Christophers in Antwerp on 29 August 2009.
- Serenity (2009), for S.A.T.B. choir and organ
  - premièred by students of St. Aloysius' College in Glasgow on 21 June 2009.
- Summae Trinitati (2009), for S.A.T.B. choir, brass septet, timpani and organ
  - premièred by the Choir of Westminster Cathedral directed by Martin Baker at Westminster Cathedral, London on 21 May 2009.
- Tota pulchra es (2009), for S.A.T.B. choir and organ
  - premièred by the Choir of the Basilica of the National Shrine of the Immaculate Conception at the Basilica of the National Shrine of the Immaculate Conception in Washington, D.C., on 8 July 2010.
- Who are these angels? (2009), for male vocal ensemble (T.T.Bar.B.B.) and string quartet
  - setting of an anonymous text (attributed to St. Augustine); premièred by DoelenKwartet and ensemble amarcord in Grote or Sint-Laurenskerk, Rotterdam on 28 April 2009.
- Ave Maria (2010), for S.A.T.B. choir and organ
  - first performed by the Boys, Girls and Men of All Saints Northampton directed by Lee Dunleavy with Richard Pinel (organ) at St George's Chapel, Windsor on 27 July 2010.
- Lassie, wad ye loe me? (2010), for a cappella mixed voices with multiple divisi
  - setting of an anonymous Scottish text
- Mass of Blessed John Henry Newman (2010), for cantor, congregation, organ with optional brass and timpani
  - commissioned for Pope Benedict XVI's visit to the UK; first performed in Bellahouston Park, Glasgow on 16 September 2010.
- Sonnet (2010), for vocal duet (S.S. or S.MS.) a cappella
  - words by Shakespeare
- The Strathclyde Motets – Qui meditabitur (2010), for a cappella S.S.A.T.T.B.B. choir
  - Communion antiphon for Ash Wednesday. Gifted to the University of Strathclyde Chaplaincy; premièred by Strathclyde University Chamber Choir directed by Alan Tavener at St Columba's RC Parish Church, Glasgow on 17 February 2010.
- The Strathclyde Motets – Benedicimus Deum caeli (2010), for a cappella S.S.A.T.T.B. choir
  - Gifted to the University of Strathclyde Chaplaincy; premièred by the Strathclyde University Chamber Choir directed by Alan Tavener at St Columba's RC Parish Church, Glasgow on 30 May 2010.
- Think of how God loves you (2010), for a cappella S.A.T.B. choir
  - premièred by the choir of St Columba Church of Scotland, Glasgow directed by the composer on 22 August 2010.
- Tu es Petrus (2010), for S.A.T.B. choir, brass ensemble, percussion and organ
  - Introit – premièred by the Choir of Westminster Cathedral under the direction of Martin Baker in Westminster Cathedral on 18 September 2010.
- Credo (2011) for S.A.T.B. choir and orchestra
  - premièred by the BBC Philharmonic, the Manchester Chamber Choir, the Northern Sinfonia Chorus, and the Rushley Singers under the direction of Juanjo Mena on 7 August 2012
- Cum vidisset Jesus (2012), for a cappella S.S.S.S.A.A.T.T.B.B. choir
  - Antiphon on the Feast of the Seven Dolours of the Blessed Virgin Mary; commissioned by Sacred Music at the University of Notre Dame in honor of the Sisters of the Holy Cross; premièred by the Notre Dame Festival Chorus under the direction of Carmen-Helena Téllez at Leighton Hall, DeBartolo Performing Arts Center, University of Notre Dame on 15 September 2012.
- Since it was the Day of Preparation... (2015), for S.A.T.B. choir (or soloists), bass soloist and instrumental ensemble (cello, clarinet, French horn, harp and theorbo)
  - A setting of the continuation of St John's Gospel after the end of the often-set Passion narrative, involving Christ's burial and post-Resurrection appearances to His disciples. First performed at Greyfriars Kirk, Edinburgh on 22 August 2012 by Hebrides Ensemble and Synergy Vocals with William Conway (cello) and Brindley Sherratt (bass soloist) as part of the Edinburgh International Festival.
- Stabat Mater (2015), for chorus and orchestra
  - MacMillan's setting of the Stabat Mater, the Biblical scene of Mary under the cross upon which hangs Jesus, her son. Commissioned by the Genesis Foundation. First performed at the Barbican Centre, London on 15 October 2016 by The Sixteen and Britten Sinfonia, directed by Harry Christophers.
- Ut omnes unum sint (2015), for a cappella S.S.A.A.T.T.B.B. choir and T.T.B. soloists
  - A setting of John 17:21–22, Christ's exhortation for unity amongst his followers. Commissioned by Belfast choir Cappella Caeciliana for its 20th anniversary, and dedicated to its Musical Director Donal McCrisken. The trio solo is written for the choir's founder members The Priests. First performed at St Mary's Cathedral, Edinburgh (Roman Catholic), on 21 November 2015 by Cappella Caeciliana, directed by the composer. Recorded by Cappella Caeciliana and The Priests on the CD UNITY May they all be one.
- A European Requiem (2015), for countertenor (or alto), baritone, mixed chorus, and orchestra
  - Commissioned by the Oregon Bach Festival, partially supported by an award from the National Endowment for the Arts. First performed at the Hult Center for the Performing Arts in Eugene, Oregon, on 2 July 2016 by the countertenor Christopher Ainslie, the baritone Morgan Smith, the Berwick Chorus of the Oregon Bach Festival, and the Oregon Bach Festival Orchestra conducted by Matthew Halls.
- The Present (2017), for SATB chorus and piano
  - Commissioned by the Glasgow School of Art Choir. World premiere recording released 27 May 2022.
- Symphony No. 5 (2018), for chorus and orchestra
  - Commissioned by the Genesis Foundation. First performed in Usher Hall, Edinburgh, on 17 August 2019 by The Sixteen, the Genesis Sixteen chamber choir, and Scottish Chamber Orchestra conducted by Harry Christophers.
- Vidi Aquam (2020), for a cappella 40 part choir
  - Commissioned by Ora Singers as a companion motet for Spem in Alium by Thomas Tallis.
- Let us love one another (2021), for SSA and organ
  - Commissioned by Mayfield School on the occasion of its 150th anniversary. Dedicated to Matthew Ward. First performed on 18 June 2022 by the Schola Cantorum of Mayfield School.
- Christmas Oratorio
  - First performed at the Concertgebouw Amsterdam on 16 January 2021 by the Netherlands Radio Filharmonisch Orkest and Groot Omroepkoor.
- Mass of St Edward the Confessor (2022)
  - First performed at Westminster Abbey, 29 June 2022.
- Who shall separate us? for an eight-part choir a cappella S.S.A.A.T.T.B.B.
  - Composed for and performed during the funeral service for Queen Elizabeth II in Westminster Abbey on 19 September 2022
- Timotheus, Bacchus and Cecilia, for chorus, semichorus, children's choir and orchestra (2022)
  - Commissioned jointly by the Hallé and Cincinnati Symphony orchestras, completed in 2022, and given its world premiere in Cincinnati in May 2023 by the May Festival Chorus, May Festival Youth Chorus, and Cincinnati Symphony Orchestra conducted by Juanjo Mena, and European and London premieres between May and July 2024 by the Hallé Choir, the Hallé Youth Choir, the Hallé Children's Choir, and The Hallé conducted by Sir Mark Elder

== Chamber ==
- The Road to Ardtalla (1983), for ensemble of 6 players
  - 15-minute work, premièred by the Manchester University New Music Ensemble under the direction of the composer in Manchester on 6 November 1987.
- Three Dawn Rituals (1983), for chamber ensemble of 8 players
  - premièred by the Nomos Ensemble in London on 2 November 1985.
- Two Visions of Hoy (1986), for oboe and ensemble of 6 players
  - premièred by the Manchester University New Music Ensemble under the direction of the composer in Manchester on 17 June 1986.
- Two Movements (1987), for wind quintet
  - premièred by the faculty ensemble at the Royal Scottish Academy of Music and Drama in Glasgow on 29 June 2007.
- Untold (1987, rev.1991), for wind quintet
  - commissioned by Ayr Arts Guild for the Flaxton Ensemble, who premièred the work in Ayr on 13 September 1988.
- Variation on Johnny Faa' (1988), for soprano, flute, cello and harp
  - a brief setting of a Traditional English text
- Visions of a November Spring (1988), for string quartet
  - premièred by the Bingham Quartet in Glasgow on 3 May 1989.
- The Exorcism of Rio Sumpúl (1989), for ensemble of 13 players
  - commissioned by the Paragon Ensemble for the Glasgow 1990 City of Culture celebrations. Premièred by the Paragon Ensemble in Glasgow on 28 January 1990.
- ...as others see us... (1990), for ensemble of 9 players
  - commissioned by the Scottish Chamber Orchestra, who premièred the work at the National Portrait Gallery, London on 5 April 1990.
- Intercession (1991), for three oboes
  - commissioned by the Huddersfield Contemporary Music Festival with funds from Yorkshire and Humberside Arts; premièred by the Chione Oboe Trio at the Huddersfield Art Gallery on 26 November 1991.
- Scots Song (1991), for soprano and ensemble
  - a setting of The Tryst by William Soutar; premièred by the Composers Ensemble in Brighton, Sussex on 10 May 1991.
- Tuireadh (1991), for clarinet and string quartet
  - premièred by James Campbell and the Allegri Quartet at St Magnus Cathedral in Kirkwall, Orkney on 25 June 1991.
- They saw the stone had been rolled away (1993), fanfare for brass and percussion
  - premièred by the Edinburgh Festival Ensemble under Christopher Bell at St Giles Cathedral, Edinburgh on 27 August 1993 as part of the Edinburgh International Festival.
- Memento (1994), for string quartet
  - written in memory of David Huntley, a friend of the composer's and the representative of Boosey & Hawkes in the United States. The work was premièred at a memorial concert for Huntley by the Kronos Quartet at Merkin Hall, New York on 13 October 1994.
- Adam's Rib (1994–95), for brass quintet
  - commissioned by the Scottish Chamber Orchestra, members of whom gave the première at Usher Hall, Edinburgh on 28 March 1995.
- A Different World (1995), for violin and piano
  - premièred by Madeleine Mitchell (violin) and John Lenehan (piano) at Almeida Theatre, London on 22 July 1995.
- Fourteen Little Pictures (1997), for piano trio
  - commissioned by the BBC to mark the 25th anniversary of the collaboration of Peter Frankl, György Pauk and Ralph Kirshbaum, who together gave the world première of the work at the Wigmore Hall, London on 21 May 1997.
- The Prophecy (1997), for soprano and ensemble
  - setting of the Story of Deirdre, as translated by Kenneth Hurlstone-Jackson in A Celtic Miscellany. Version premièred by Cristina Zavalloni (soprano) and Sentieri Selvaggi at the Teatro alla Scala, Milan on 12 March 2001.
- Raising Sparks (1997), for mezzo-soprano and ensemble
  - commissioned by the Nash Ensemble, who premièred the work with mezzo-soprano Jean Rigby under the direction of Martyn Brabbins at the Queen Elizabeth Hall, Southbank Centre, London on 5 October 1997.
- Exsultet (1998), for brass quintet and optional percussion
  - commissioned by the Royal Scottish Academy of Music and Drama or the opening of the new Sir Alexander Gibson Opera School; premièred by members of the RSAMD in Glasgow on 1 December 1998.
- Gaudeamus in loci pace (1998), for solo organ
  - premièred by Joseph Cullen at Pluscarden Abbey on 12 September 1998.
- Why is this night different? (1998), for string quartet
  - commissioned by the Maggini Quartet, who premièred the work the Wigmore Hall, London on 23 April 1998.
- Cello Sonata No. 1 (1999), for cello and piano
  - commissioned by the Bath and Queensland Biennial Festivals of 1999 and specially written for its dedicatee Raphael Wallfisch, who premièred the work at the Bath Assembly Rooms with John York on 30 May 1999.
- Cumnock Fair (1999), for piano and string quintet
  - commissioned by the Cumnock Music Club for its Golden Jubilee Concert; premièred by members of the Scottish Chamber Orchestra at Cumnock Academy, Ayrshire on 23 March 1999.
- Cello Sonata No. 2 (2000), for cello and piano
  - premièred by Julian Lloyd Webber and John Lenehan at the Queen's Hall, Edinburgh on 17 April 2001.
- Northern Skies (2000), for cello and piano
  - premièred by Catherine MacMillan, Fay Jennett, Rachel Brolly, Alison Jones (cello) and Myra Chahin (piano) at Hutcheson's Hall, Glasgow on 9 March 2001.
- A Deep but Dazzling Darkness (2001–02), concerto for violin, large ensemble and tape
  - co-commissioned by LSO St Luke's and the Saratoga Chamber Music Festival; premièred by violinist Gordan Nikolitch with the London Symphony Orchestra under the composer at LSO St Luke's, London on 27 March 2003.
- For Max (2004), for piano quintet
  - written as a birthday gift to Sir Peter Maxwell Davies; premièred by the Nash Ensemble during the St Magnus Festival at St Magnus Cathedral, Kirkwall, Orkney on 22 June 2004.
- For Michael (2004), for piano quintet
  - premièred by pianist Aleksander Madzar and the Belcea Quartet at the Pittville Pump Room in Cheltenham on 15 July 2004.
- For Sally (2006), for piano quintet
  - written as a short tribute to a long time friend of MacMillan's, composer Sally Beamish. Premièred by the Nash Ensemble directed by Martyn Brabbins at the Pittville Pump Room in Cheltenham on 5 July 2006.
- Chant for John (2007), for piano quartet
  - brief work dedicated to the composer's teacher John Casken.
- Horn Quintet (2007), for horn and string quartet
  - commissioned by the Nash Ensemble, who gave the world première with Richard Watkins (horn) at the Pittville Pump Room, Cheltenham on 9 July 2007.
- String Quartet No. 3 (2007)
  - written for the Takacs Quartet, who premièred the work at the Queen Elizabeth Hall, London on 21 May 2008.
- Etwas zurückhaltend (2008), for string quartet
  - re-working of a piece originally composed in 1982, while MacMillan was a student of John Casken at the University of Durham. This newly re-worked version of the same score was premièred by the Edinburgh Quartet at Canongate Kirk, Edinburgh on 31 March 2010.
- Lament of Mary, Queen of Scots (2008), for soprano, tenor and piano trio
  - written to celebrate the 250th anniversary of the birth Robert Burns; premièred Lorna Anderson (soprano), Jamie MacDougall (tenor) and the Haydn Trio Eisenstadt at the University of Glasgow on 16 January 2009.
- The Beneficiaries (2009), for soprano, clarinet and piano
  - commissioned by soprano Jane Manning OBE, who gave the work's première with Jane's Minstrels in the Purcell Room of the Southbank Centre, London on 25 February 2010.
- Processional (2010), for organ, brass ensemble and percussion

== Vocal ==
- Variation on Johnny Faa' (1988), for soprano, flute, cello and harp
  - a brief setting of a Traditional English text
- Three Scottish Songs (1995) for voice and piano
  - settings of 'Scots Song' (aka 'The Tryst') (1991), 'Ballad' (1994) and 'The Children' (1995), texts by William Soutar. 'Scots Song' was premièred by the Composers Ensemble in Brighton, Sussex on 10 May 1991.
- The Prophecy (1997), for soprano and ensemble
  - setting of the Story of Deirdre, as translated by Kenneth Hurlstone-Jackson in A Celtic Miscellany. Version premièred by Cristina Zavalloni (soprano) and Sentieri Selvaggi at the Teatro alla Scala, Milan on 12 March 2001.
- Raising Sparks (1997), for mezzo-soprano and ensemble
  - commissioned by the Nash Ensemble, who premièred the work with mezzo-soprano Jean Rigby under the direction of Martyn Brabbins at the Queen Elizabeth Hall, Southbank Centre, London on 5 October 1997.
- Lament of Mary, Queen of Scots (2008), for soprano, tenor and piano trio
  - written to celebrate the 250th anniversary of the birth Robert Burns; premièred by Lorna Anderson (soprano), Jamie MacDougall (tenor) and the Haydn Trio Eisenstadt at the University of Glasgow on 16 January 2009.
- The Beneficiaries (2009), for soprano, clarinet and piano
  - commissioned by soprano Jane Manning OBE, who gave the work's première with Jane's Minstrels in the Purcell Room of the Southbank Centre, London on 25 February 2010.

== Piano(s) ==
- Piano Sonata (1985)
  - sonata in three movements. First performed on 26 February 1989 at the Purcell Room, London by Rolf Hind.
- A Cecilian Variation for JFK (1991)
  - variation on the overture to Purcell's St Cecilia Ode (1683); written as a tribute to John F Kennedy on the anniversary of his assassination. Premiered on 22 November 1991 at Kennedy Center, Washington, D.C., by David Owen Norris.
- Barncleupédie (1992)
  - written as a gift to the composer's friends Barbara and Kenneth Kelly. Premiered at the Queen's Hall, Edinburgh by pianist Catherine Edwards on 28 February 1993.
- Angel (1993)
  - written as a gift to the composer's daughter; first performed by the composer on 31 October 1993 at Stockbridge Parish Church, Edinburgh.
- Birthday Present (1997)
- Lumen Christi (1997)
  - premiered on 11 April 1997 at Palazzo Barozzi, Milan by Carlo Boccadoro.
- in angustiis... I (2001)
  - premiered on 16 February 2002 at Glasgow University by pianist Simon Smith.
- For Ian (2000)
  - written in memory of the composer's friend and Church of Scotland minister Ian Tweedlie. First performed on 8 February 2000 by the composer at St Ninian's Women's Guild, Cumnock.
- 25th May 1967 and For Neil (2002)
  - two short pieces for solo piano, celebrating the composer's devotion to football, and in particular Celtic Football Club. The first (25th May 1967) is dedicated to former right-back Jim Craig, and the second (For Neil) to former captain and manager Neil Lennon. First performed on 6 May 2003 at Gonville and Caius College, Cambridge by pianist Simon Smith.
- Walfrid, On His Arrival At The Gates Of Paradise (2008)
  - originally written for a group of folk instruments to celebrate the 2005 unveiling of a statue of the founder of Celtic Football Club, Brother Walfrid, the piano version was published in 2008.
