= The World's Ransoming =

1996 concerto by James MacMillan

The World's Ransoming is a concerto for cor anglais and orchestra by the Scottish composer James MacMillan. It was the first of three interrelated compositions in MacMillan's Easter triptych Triduum commissioned by the London Symphony Orchestra. Its world premiere was given by the soloist Christine Pendrill (to whom the piece is dedicated) and the London Symphony Orchestra under the direction of Kent Nagano at the Barbican Centre on 11 July 1996.

== Composition ==
The World's Ransoming was composed between 1995 and 1996. It has a duration of roughly 21 minutes and is cast in one continuous movement.

=== Background ===
The World's Ransoming was the first of three pieces comprising MacMillan's Easter triptych Triduum, which would later include the composer's Cello Concerto and his Symphony: 'Vigil'. In the score program notes, MacMillan wrote, "The World's Ransoming focuses on Maundy Thursday and its musical material includes references to plainsongs for that day, Pange lingua and Ubi caritas as well as a Bach chorale (Ach wie nichtig) which I have heard being sung in the eucharistic procession to the altar of repose." The title of the piece comes from the words of Thomas Aquinas's hymn Pange Lingua.

=== Instrumentation ===
The work is scored for a solo cor anglais and an orchestra consisting of two flutes (both doubling piccolo), oboe, two clarinets (2nd doubling bass clarinet), two bassoons (2nd doubling contrabassoon), four horns, two trumpets, three trombones, timpani, percussion, and strings.

== Reception ==
Arnold Whittall of Gramophone compared the work favorably to MacMillan's The Confession of Isobel Gowdie, writing, "The World's Ransoming is more temperate, with more substance to its passages of lament, and with more power to the assaults on spirituality which it depicts." The music was similarly praised by BBC Music Magazine and Tim Ashley of The Guardian, who wrote, "The World's Ransoming contrasts pacifism with violence in a powerful meditation on the events leading to the Crucifixion."

== Recordings ==
The World's Ransoming has twice been commercially recorded. The first recording, performed by Pendrill and the BBC Scottish Symphony Orchestra under Osmo Vänskä, was released through BIS Records on 23 March 1999. The second recording, performed by Pendrill and the London Symphony Orchestra under Colin Davis, was released through the orchestra's label on 8 January 2008.

== See also ==
- List of compositions by James MacMillan
- List of concertos for English horn
