= Saxophone Concerto (MacMillan) =

2017 saxophone concerto by James MacMillan

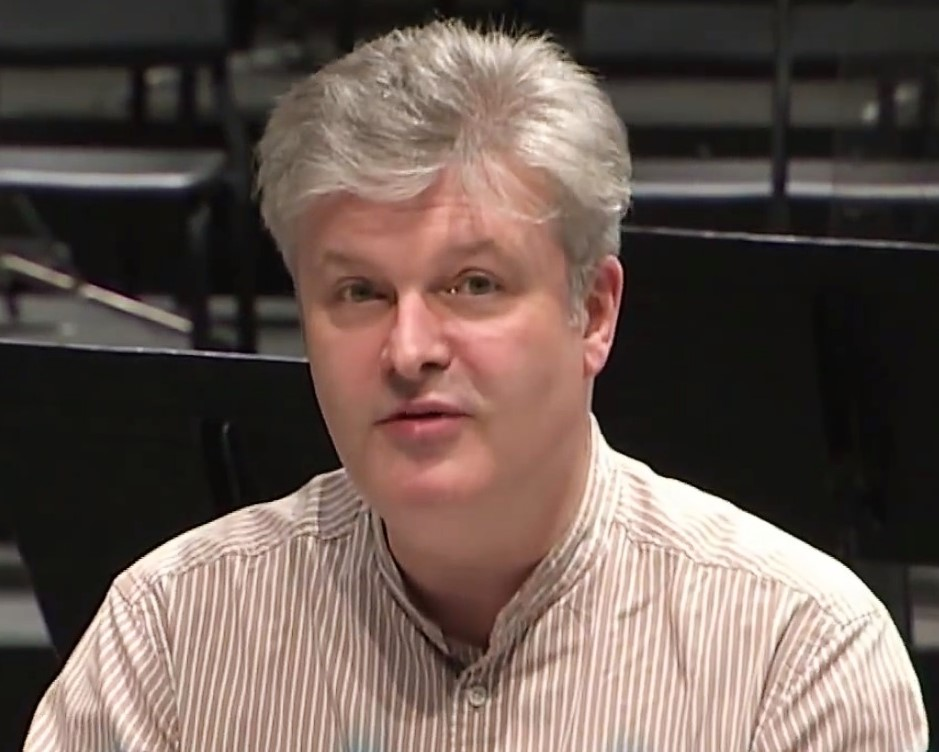
James MacMillan in 2012

The Saxophone Concerto is a composition for soprano saxophone and string orchestra by the Scottish composer James MacMillan. The work was composed in 2017 on a commission from Perth Concert Hall, the Adelaide Symphony Orchestra, and the Aurora Orchestra. Its world premiere was given by the Australian saxophonist Amy Dickson and the Scottish Chamber Orchestra conducted by Joseph Swensen at Perth Concert Hall on 11 April 2018.

== Composition ==
The concerto lasts about 15 minutes and is cast in three movements. The piece was inspired by elements of Scottish folk music. Each movement is thus named for the various forms of traditional Scottish music on which it's based:

1. March, Strathspey and Reel
2. Gaelic Psalm
3. Jigs

== Reception ==
Reviewing the world premiere, Miranda Heggie of The Arts Desk praised the concerto, writing, "It's as intricate as it is concise. The depth to the architecture of James MacMillan's Saxophone Concerto [...] is quite astounding, and all the more so for being packed into three five-minute movements." David Kettle of The Scotsman similarly described the piece as "a remarkably concentrated, punchy, pungent piece, with extraordinarily inventive, piquant writing for his string orchestra."
