= Perth Concert Hall =

Perth Concert Hall may refer to:

- Perth Concert Hall (Scotland)
- Perth Concert Hall (Western Australia)
