= Symphony No. 1 (MacMillan) =

1997 orchestral symphony by James MacMillan

The Symphony No. 1 or Symphony: 'Vigil' is an orchestral symphony by the Scottish composer James MacMillan. It is the last of three interrelated compositions in MacMillan's Easter triptych Triduum commissioned by the London Symphony Orchestra. The piece was first performed at the Barbican Centre on 28 September 1997 by the London Symphony Orchestra under the conductor Mstislav Rostropovich.

== Composition ==
=== Background ===
The Symphony: 'Vigil' was the third of three pieces comprising MacMillan's Easter triptych Triduum, which also included the composer's cor anglais concerto The World's Ransoming and his Cello Concerto. MacMillan described his inspiration for the symphony in the score program notes, writing:

The initial inspiration for Symphony: 'Vigil' came through the potential interplay of the elements of fire and water, which are central to the liturgy of the Easter Vigil. This ceremony is also known as the Service of Light and it was the light-giving aspect of fire which especially caught my imagination, including the possibilities of playing with the differences in light and shade, from complete darkness and bleakness to blazing illumination and everything in between.

=== Structure ===
The symphony has a duration of roughly 53 minutes and is composed in three movements:

1. Light
2. Tuba insonet salutaris
3. Water

=== Instrumentation ===
The work is scored for an orchestra comprising three flutes (3rd doubling piccolo), two oboes, cor anglais, two clarinets, bass clarinet, two bassoons, contrabassoon, four horns, three trumpets, three trombones, tuba, timpani, three percussionists, harp, piano (doubling celesta), and strings and a separate brass quintet comprising a horn, two trumpets, trombone, and tuba.

== Reception ==
Arnold Whittall of Gramophone gave the symphony moderate praise, writing:

The 48-minute Symphony which completes the triptych sets itself the task of moving from images of suffering and death to those of rebirth and transcendent affirmation. Its structure, with two preliminary movements lasting around 22 minutes and a grand finale running for 26, led me to wonder whether the last movement on its own might not have performed the formal and expressive task required. Certainly it contains enough diversity, with elements of Dionysian celebration and solemn, aspiring ceremonial before a protracted, turbulent crisis dissolves into the sweet soulfulness of the ending. Or you could argue that all three movements are needed to provide an adequate balance to The World's Ransoming and the Cello Concerto together. Any early verdict on a work as substantial and wide-ranging as this is bound to be provisional.

Reviewing the complete Triduum triptych, BBC Music Magazine similarly wrote:

Listening to the trilogy, one steps decisively into MacMillan's serious, heartfelt sound-world: the three works are contemplations of Maundy Thursday, Good Friday and Holy Saturday, expressed in music of searing intensity and extreme contrasts. One may feel that some of the effects MacMillan uses – the overlaid screaming brass fanfares, the extensive use of percussion – are excessive, but they are contained within a tautly argued, tightly structured whole, and possessed of a thrillingly direct – and profoundly affecting – musicality. I defy anyone not to be moved by this music, whether for its considerable emotional impact or purely the artistry of its musical structures.

== See also ==
- List of compositions by James MacMillan
