= Symphony No. 3 (MacMillan) =

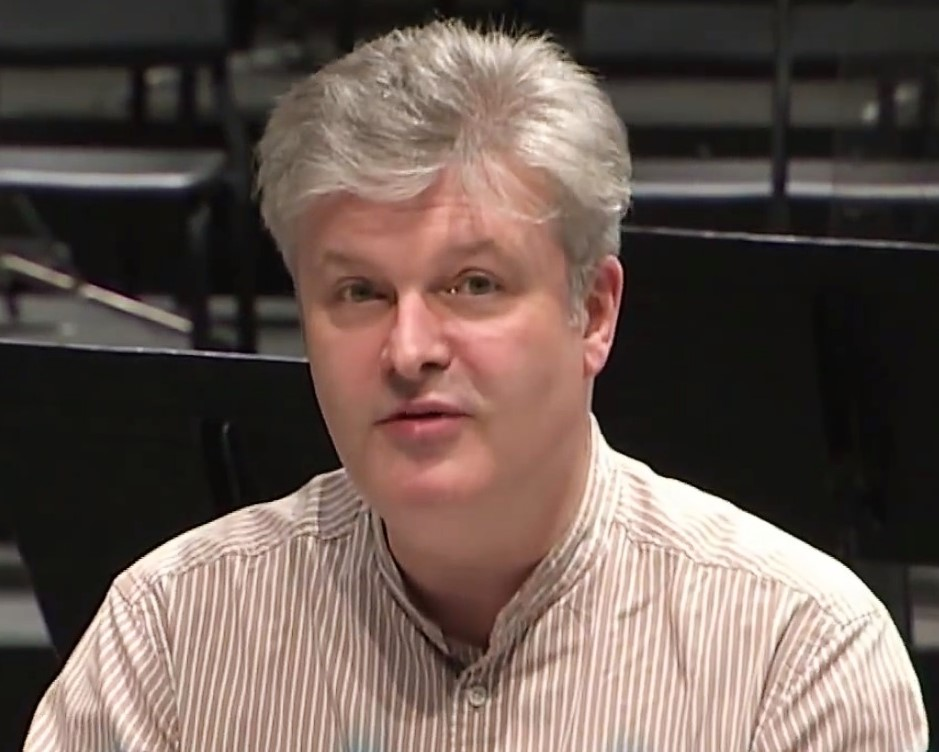
James MacMillan in 2012

The Symphony No. 3 (also known as Symphony No. 3 "Silence") is the third symphony by the Scottish composer James MacMillan. The piece was first performed on April 17, 2003 in NHK Hall, Tokyo, by the NHK Symphony Orchestra under the conductor Charles Dutoit.

== Composition ==
The symphony has a duration of roughly 36 minutes and is composed in one continuous movement. The title of the piece comes from the 1966 novel Silence by the Japanese author Shūsaku Endō. MacMillan described this inspiration in the score program notes, writing:

His book asks profound philosophical questions and resonates with one of the most anguished questions asked 2,000 years ago "My God, my God, why have you abandoned me?" Endo's "silence" is the silence of God in the face of terrible events springing from the merciless nature of man: torture, genocide, holocaust. After experiencing one of these events, one of Endo's characters writes: "I cannot bear the monotonous sound of the dark sea gnawing at the shore. Behind the depressing silence of this sea, the silence of God… the feeling that while men raise their voices in anguish, God remains with folded arms, silent." For Endo, though, this silence is not absence but presence. It is the silence of accompaniment rather than "nihil". This is a notion that has many musical analogies. Music itself grows out of silence. The emptiness and solitude of a composer's silence is nevertheless pregnant with the promise of possibility and potency. The immateriality of music points to the reality of different types of existence. Music is not a physical reality in the sense that we are, or any other thing is. You cannot see, touch or taste music, but its powerful presence always makes itself felt.

The composition also includes a musical allusion to the prelude from Richard Wagner's opera Das Rheingold.

=== Instrumentation ===
The work is scored for an orchestra comprising two flutes, alto flute (doubling piccolo), two oboes, cor anglais, two clarinets, bass clarinet, contrabass clarinet, two bassoons, contrabassoon, four horns, three trumpets, three trombones, tuba, timpani, four percussionists (playing marimba, tuned gongs, 5 temple blocks, snare drum, suspended cymbal, glockenspiel, steel drums, bass drum, crotales, tubular bells, 3 heavy metal bars, 2 congas, 2 timbales, medium tam-tam, cencerros, vibraphone, large tam-tam and thunder sheet), harp, piano, and strings.

== Reception ==
Roger Thomas of BBC Music Magazine lauded the symphony, writing, "The work is a hauntingly ambivalent study at both the musical and philosophical levels, with themes and textures arising seemingly from their own absence, interacting and developing, then being allowed to return to their origins." David Nice of The Arts Desk was more critical, however, remarking that the work "sounded like an unwieldy impersonation of the monumental."

WQXR-FM included the piece in their list of the "Top Five Sounds of Silence" in classical music, remarking that MacMillan "finds all kinds of potential and promise in silence, dots this work (as well as many of his others) with pregnant pauses, and meditative moments."

== See also ==
- List of compositions by James MacMillan
