= Violin Concerto No. 1 (MacMillan) =

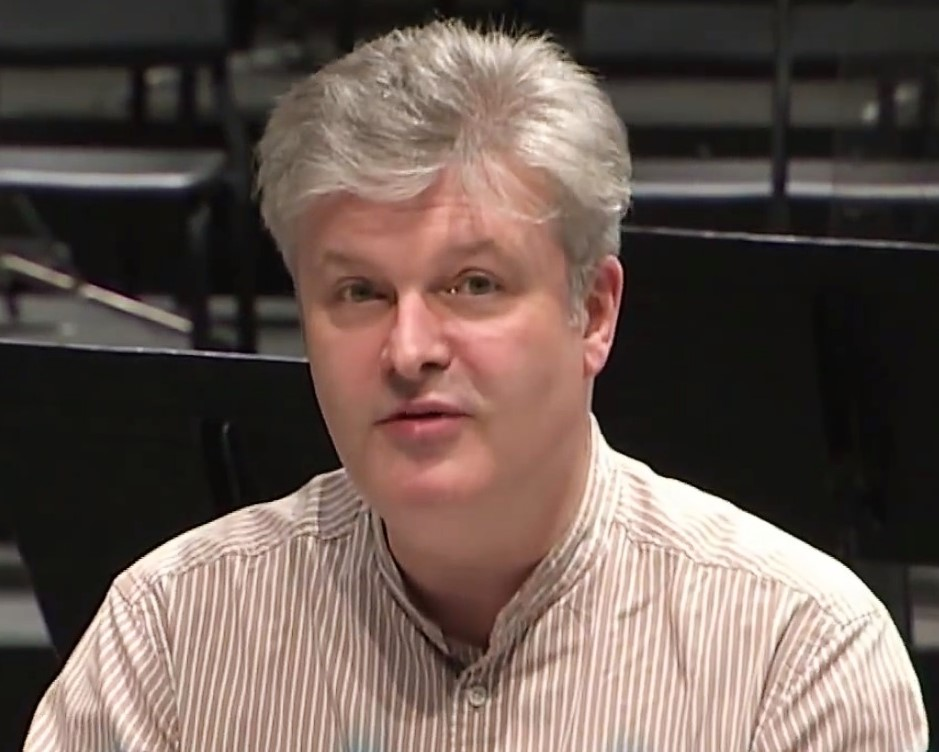
James MacMillan in 2012

The Violin Concerto No. 1 is a composition for solo violin and orchestra by the Scottish composer James MacMillan. The piece was first performed at the Barbican Centre on May 12, 2010 by the violinist Vadim Repin and the London Symphony Orchestra under the conductor Valery Gergiev. The work is dedicated to Vadim Repin and in memoriam the composer's mother, Ellen MacMillan.

== Composition ==
The Violin Concerto has a duration of roughly 25 minutes and is composed in three movements:

1. Dance
2. Song
3. Song and Dance

=== Instrumentation ===
The work is scored for solo violin and an orchestra comprising two flutes, two oboes, cor anglais, two clarinets, bassoon, contrabassoon, two horns, two trumpets, two trombones, tuba, timpani, two percussionists, piano, and strings.

== Reception ==
Reviewing the world premiere, David Nice of The Arts Desk lauded, "As soloist Vadim Repin and conductor Valery Gergiev whirled us tumultuously through its hyperactive songs and dances, there was so much I wanted to savour, to hear again. That won't be a problem. So long as there are violinists of Repin's calibre able to play it, the work is here to stay." He added:

On one level it's a brilliant tour de force which does everything a virtuoso could wish, combining some of the fast, furious, fiddling reels complete with signature drum the bodhrán which are in MacMillan's musical DNA with the necessary chance to let the violin sing - and how, in Repin's dazzling, pitch-perfect performance. Nothing stays the same for long, not even in the dreamlike central Larghetto, where any worries that the composer will let woodwind and soloist sit too long on sentimental songs are quickly banished by the kaleidoscopic revolution of events. Little did I think that only days after the quick-change fantasies of Martinů's Sixth Symphony I'd be listening to another work which demands alert, quicksilver listening.

The piece received similar praise in the United States, where Steve Smith of The New York Times wrote, "Mr. MacMillan’s estimable mastery of orchestral timbre and effect is evident throughout." George Loomis of The Classical Review similarly opined that the concerto "makes for exhilarating and absorbing listening."

== See also ==
- List of compositions by James MacMillan
