= A Scotch Bestiary =

Contemporary organ concerto

A Scotch Bestiary: Enigmatic Variations on a Zoological Carnival at a Caledonian Exhibition is an organ concerto by the Scottish composer James MacMillan. The work was commissioned by the BBC and the Los Angeles Philharmonic. It was composed from 2003 to 2004 and was first performed by the organist Wayne Marshall and the Los Angeles Philharmonic under the direction of Esa-Pekka Salonen at the Walt Disney Concert Hall on October 7, 2004. Paul Jacobs gave the American East Coast premiere of this work in January 2018 in Philadelphia's Kimmel Center for the Performing Arts with the Philadelphia Orchestra and conductor Yannick Nézet-Séguin.

== Composition ==
=== Background ===
A Scotch Bestiary was composed as a set of musical portraits for organ and orchestra. As the subtitle indicates, the piece was conceived in the style of such similarly episodic works as Edward Elgar's Enigma Variations, Camille Saint-Saëns's The Carnival of the Animals, and Modest Mussorgsky's Pictures at an Exhibition. Knowing the first performance was to be held in the Walt Disney Concert Hall, MacMillan musically based the episodes on the style of early Disney cartoons. These variations were inspired by "human archetypes and personalities" MacMillan had encountered throughout his life in Scotland.

=== Structure ===
A Scotch Bestiary has a duration of roughly 33 minutes and is composed in two parts, the first of which is divided into several smaller movements:

Part I: The Menagerie, Caged

1. Ode to a cro-magnon hyena

A page is turned

2. Reptiles and Big Fish (in a small pond)
3. Her Serene and Ubiquitous Majesty, Queen Bee

Another page is turned

4. The red-handed, no-surrender, howler monkey
5. Uncle Tom Cat and his chickens

Yet another page is turned

6. Scottish Patriots
7. The Reverend Cuckoo and his Parroting Chorus
8. Jackass Hackass

The book is closed

Part II: The Menagerie, Uncaged

=== Instrumentation ===
The work is scored for a solo organ and a large orchestra comprising three flutes (2nd doubling alto flute, 3rd doubling piccolo), three oboes (3rd doubling cor anglais), three clarinets (3rd doubling bass clarinet), three bassoons (3rd doubling contrabassoon), four horns, three trumpets, three trombones, tuba, timpani, four percussionists, harp, electric piano, and strings.

== Reception ==
Reviewing the world premiere, Mark Swed of the Los Angeles Times called it "a sonically spectacular concerto for organ and orchestra" and wrote, "What MacMillan has come up with is a two-part, quirkily animated concerto. His bumptious bestiary is just that, a musical book of fanciful animals impersonated by organ and orchestra. In the first part, he introduces 'a cro-magnon hyena' and the 'red-handed, no surrender, howler monkey,' as well as buzzing bees, lumbering reptiles, the cuckoo. In the second part, he lets them loose." Andrew Achenbach of Gramophone similarly described it as "a caustic, loopy and exhilarating showpiece for organ and orchestra." Stephen Johnson of BBC Music Magazine observed, "...while the Concerto has its moments of spellbound celebration, like the strings' imitation of improvised Gallic psalm-singing (one of the loveliest things in all folk music) in the central slow movement, A Scotch Bestiary is full of a black vitality which always threatens to explode into pure chaos. Some of MacMillan's targets – indicated in titles like 'The red-handed, no-surrender, howler monkey' and 'Scottish Patriots' – are easy to identify. Others, as the work's subtitle implies ('Enigmatic variations on a zoological carnival at a Caledoninan exhibition'), are more elusive to outsiders, but even then the acrid caricature remains wickedly entertaining."

== See also ==
- List of compositions by James MacMillan
