= Viola Concerto (MacMillan) =

2013 Viola Concerto by James MacMillan

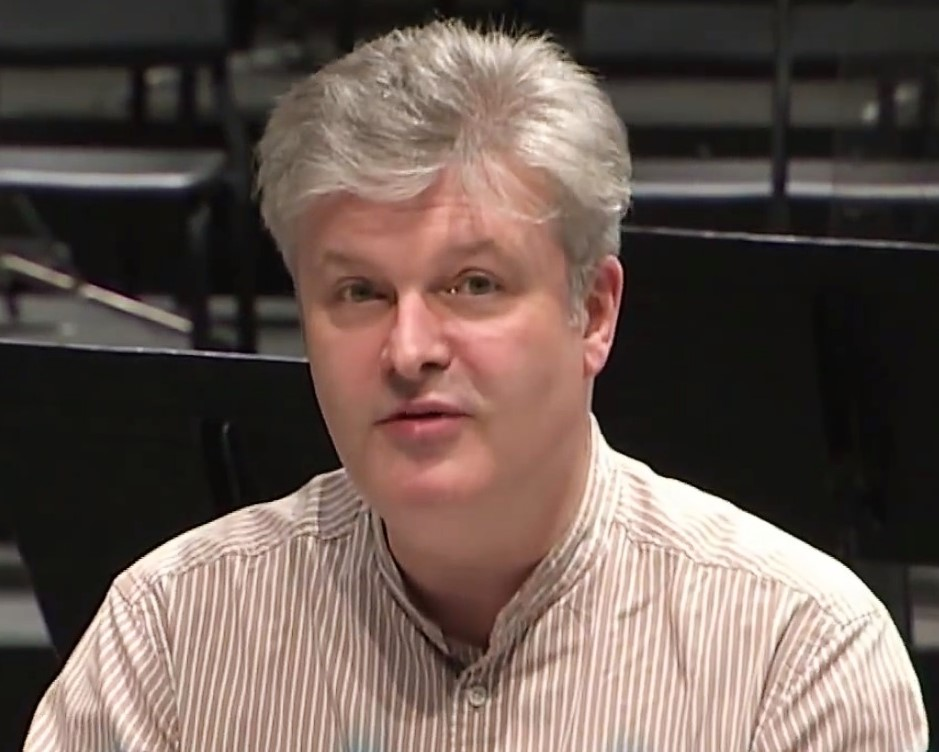
James MacMillan in 2012

Scottish composer James MacMillan composed his Viola Concerto in 2013. The work was jointly commissioned by the London Philharmonic Orchestra, the Lucerne Symphony Orchestra, the Bergen Philharmonic Orchestra, and the Adelaide Symphony Orchestra. Its world premiere was given by the violist Lawrence Power and the London Philharmonic Orchestra under the direction of Vladimir Jurowski in the Royal Festival Hall, London, on 15 January 2014. The piece is dedicated to Lawrence Power.

== Composition ==
The viola concerto has a duration of approximately 31 minutes and is composed in three numbered movements.

=== Instrumentation ===
The work is scored for a solo viola and an orchestra consisting of two flutes (2nd doubling piccolo), oboe, cor anglais, two clarinets, bassoon, contrabassoon, four horns, three trumpets, three trombones, tuba, timpani, three percussionists, harp, and strings.

== Reception ==
The viola concerto has been highly praised by music critics. Reviewing the world premiere, Fiona Maddocks of The Observer described the piece as an "inventive, three-movement piece" and said it "exploits fully the lyrical qualities of the instrument, launching with a rhapsodic solo ascent and finding bold colours via some hushed string harmonics, dissonances and glissandi. Bright sounds of harp, xylophone, vibraphone and tubular bells offset some more mellow string sounds, including those from the soloist's 400-year-old instrument." He continued, "The work, a major contribution to the repertory, is full of musical debate, not least between the solo viola and the four front-desk players of the viola and cello section, but has little in the way of show-off virtuosity for its own sake. In an unexpected gesture, the soloist finishes fractionally ahead of everyone else after some spectacular, rapid string crossing, leaving his comrades to play two final chords. Counter to its ponderous image, the viola triumphantly proves its fleet-footed ability to gallop home first."

Ivan Hewett of The Daily Telegraph called it "a hugely ambitious piece, which summoned starkly opposed worlds of feeling, and forced them into anguished confrontations." David Nice of The Arts Desk also lauded the concerto, saying "the more introspective passages proved haunting in a very MacMillanesque way." The London Evening Standard wrote, "In several respects, MacMillan's concerto refuses to conform to expectations. Muted, brooding timbres make for a surprising opening but suit the viola very well, and a frequently recurring quartet of two violas and two cellos enhances the atmosphere. Similarly resourceful scoring occurs in the finale, where a solo flute invokes the sound world of the Japanese shakuhachi. Also unconventional is the explosive opening of what is otherwise a lyrical slow movement and the viola’s disappearing act at its close."

== See also ==
- List of compositions by James MacMillan
