= Her tears fell with the dews at even =

Orchestral work by James MacMillan

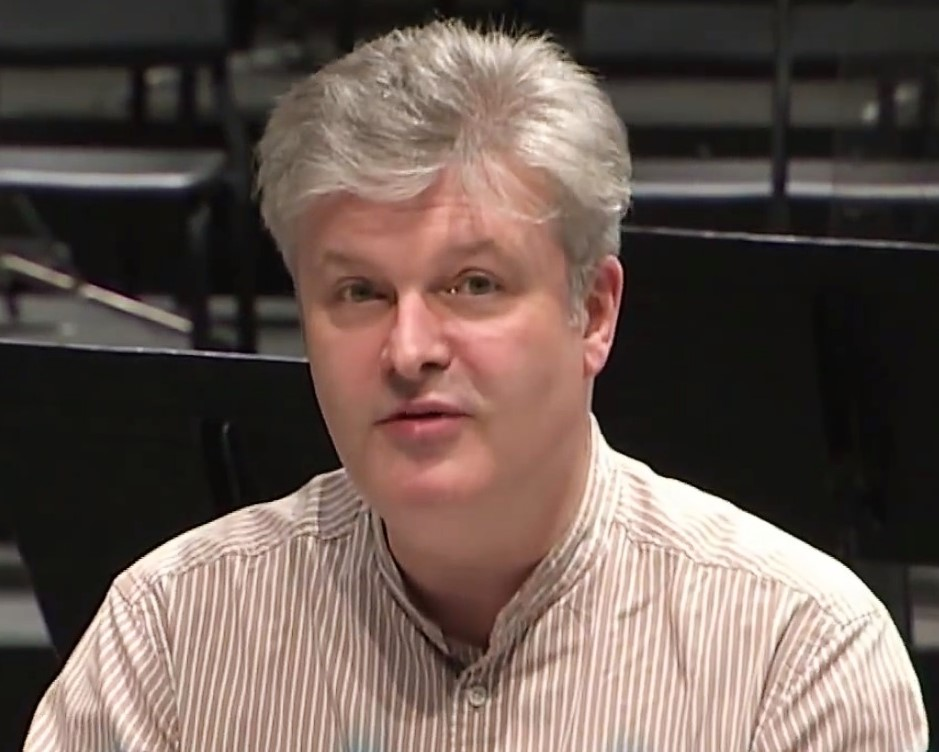
James MacMillan in 2012

Her tears fell with the dews at even is an orchestral composition written in 2020 by the Scottish composer James MacMillan. The work was commissioned by Pittsburgh Symphony Orchestra, which gave the piece its world premiere under the direction of Manfred Honeck at the Heinz Hall in Pittsburgh on 17 March 2023.

== Composition ==
Her tears fell with the dews at even is written in a single movement and has a duration of about 12 minutes. The title of the piece comes from a line in the 1830 poem "Mariana" by Alfred, Lord Tennyson; in the score program note, MacMillan wrote, "This short handful of words encapsulates a moment of grief which is the basis of the enfolding music - an extended distillation of this particular emotion." The work prominently features a solo flute, which the composer described as "the most important element in this work, and carries a lot of the thematic and emotional core."

=== Instrumentation ===
The work is scored for a large orchestra comprising two flutes, alto flute, two oboes, Cor anglais, two alto clarinets, bass clarinet, two bassoons, contrabassoon, four horns, three trumpets, three trombones, tuba, timpani, three percussionists, harp, celesta, and strings.

== Reception ==
Reviewing the world premiere, Jeremy Reynolds of the Pittsburgh Post-Gazette gave the piece a somewhat mixed review, writing, "The work began with some rumbling chords, punctuated with silence before the flute began to soar and sing. There were moments of intensity and some excellent playing from the ensemble as a whole but the music itself came off as overly fragmented and seemed to undercut its own emotional arc. Perhaps it is unfinished."

== See also ==
- List of compositions by James MacMillan
