= Symphony No. 4 (MacMillan) =

Musical composition by James MacMillan

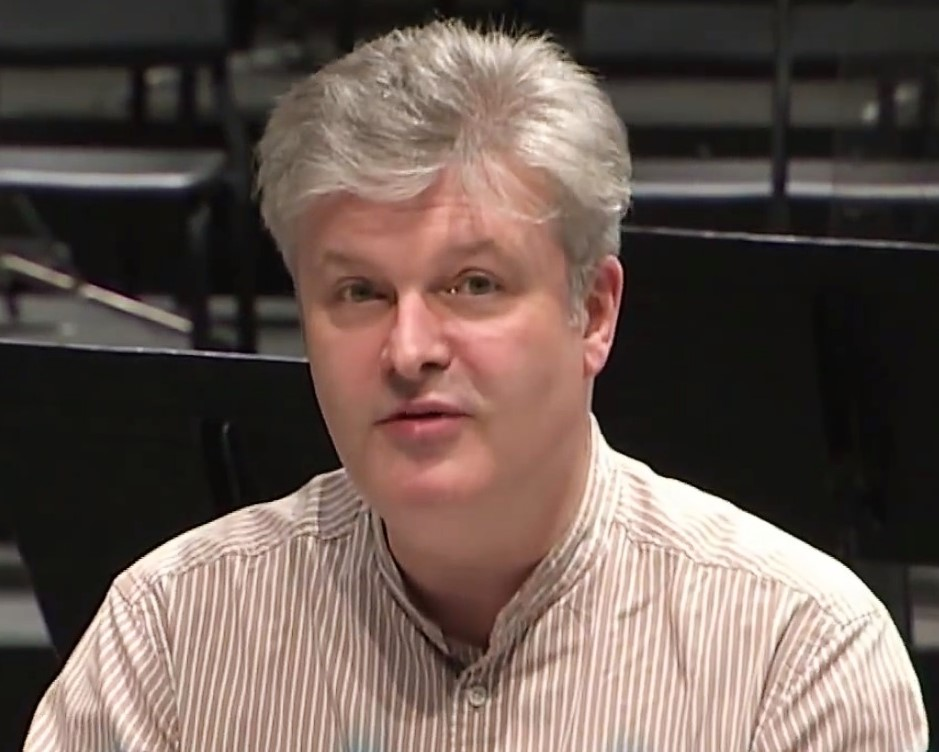
James MacMillan in 2012

The Symphony No. 4 is the fourth symphony by the Scottish composer James MacMillan. The work was composed in celebration of the conductor Donald Runnicles's 60th birthday. It was premiered at The Proms on August 3, 2015, by the BBC Scottish Symphony Orchestra under Donald Runnicles.

== Composition ==
The symphony has a duration of roughly 37 minutes and is composed in one continuous movement. Though MacMillan had conceived the symphony years earlier, he did not begin work on the piece until late 2014. The work quotes passages from Missa Dum Sacrum Mysterium by the Renaissance composer Robert Carver. MacMillan described the use of Carver's work in an interview with The Scotsman, remarking, "He's been such a big figure in my adult life as a composer in Scotland, and I've always wanted to acknowledge some kind of debt. I love the austerity of his music, but also its complexity. I've incorporated some of his ideas into the structure of the symphony and wound my own music around it."

=== Instrumentation ===
The work is scored for an orchestra comprising two flutes (2nd doubling piccolo), two oboes (2nd doubling cor anglais), two clarinets (2nd doubling bass clarinet), bassoon, contrabassoon, four horns, three trumpets, three trombones, tuba, timpani, three percussionists, harp, piano (doubling celesta), and strings.

== Reception ==
Reviewing the world premiere, Tim Ashley of The Guardian lauded the piece, writing:

Lasting around 40 minutes, the symphony is effectively a single-movement variant on traditional sonata form built round a cluster of ideas heard in succession at the outset: ritualistic timpani throbs; a fanfare-like chorale; thickening string dissonances; and spiky, aggressive rhythmic figurations from woodwind and piano. Carver's Mass is then introduced by low solo strings, and the development weaves its way through and over it, the textures alternately clotting and clearing, the mood turning increasingly tense. Eventually serenity is achieved in a slowly unwinding cello melody accompanied by the exquisite yet eerie sound of overtones on eastern temple bowls. At this point, the emotional trajectory feels complete. But MacMillan pushes on to a big coda, complete with a series of grandiose climaxes that feel curiously forced after all that has gone before. Densely, at times exotically scored, it was grandly played. Runnicles conducted it with great affection and dignity.

The work was also praised by David Nice of The Arts Desk, Nick Trend of The Daily Telegraph, and Simon Cummings of 5:4.

== See also ==
- List of compositions by James MacMillan
