= Violin Concerto No. 2 (MacMillan) =

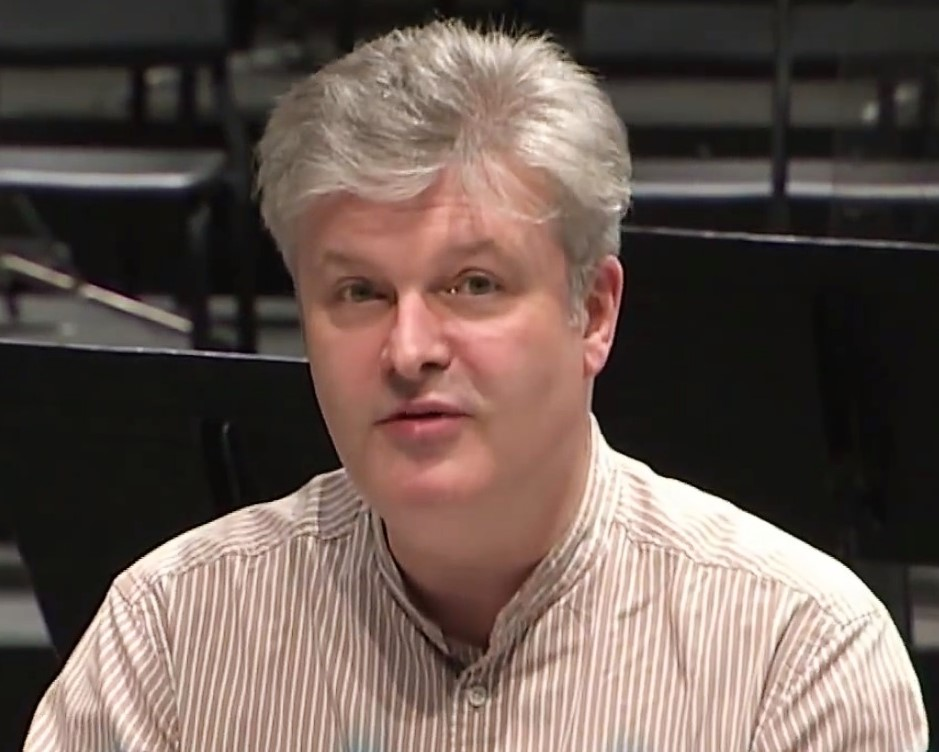
James MacMillan in 2012

The Violin Concerto No. 2 for violin and chamber orchestra is the second violin concerto by the Scottish composer James MacMillan. The work was composed in 2021 on a joint commission from the Dallas Symphony Orchestra, the Scottish Chamber Orchestra, the Swedish Chamber Orchestra, and the Adam Mickiewicz Institute. Its world premiere was given by the violinist Nicola Benedetti and the Scottish Chamber Orchestra conducted by Maxim Emelyanychev at the Perth Concert Hall on 28 September 2022. The piece is dedicated to Nicola Benedetti and in memoriam Krzysztof Penderecki.

== Composition ==
The concerto is through-composed in a single movement lasting approximately 25 minutes. MacMillan wrote the concerto while in lockdown from the COVID-19 pandemic, about which he remarked, "It seemed like a time when things tended to be more introverted. I suppose I turned inwards as well. Maybe that had an effect on the music." The music was composed around three chords, from which MacMillan built a three-note theme that develops throughout the concerto.

=== Instrumentation ===
The work is scored for solo violin and a chamber orchestra consisting of two flutes (2nd doubling piccolo), two oboes, two clarinets (2nd doubling bass clarinet), bassoon, contrabassoon, two horns, two trumpets, timpani, and strings.

== Reception ==
The concerto has been generally praised by music critics. Reviewing the world premiere, Simon Thompson of The Sunday Times called the concerto "a radiant jewel of a piece that seemed to inhabit a multitude of human emotions while guiding the listener through them with luminous clarity." He added, "MacMillan builds his concerto from the three chords of its opening, chords that open up a universe of mysteriously infinite possibilities, and which launch 25 minutes of music that is by turns serene, adventurous and threatening." Richard Sylvester Oliver of the Texas Classical Review similarly remarked, "MacMillan's eclectic musical language, marked by a firm emotional directness, is an elegant marriage of the modern and traditional, often spinning simple ideas into complex textures without sacrificing accessibility."

Rowena Smith of The Guardian was slightly more critical, however, describing it as "an at times intensely discomfiting piece, the single-movement 25-minute span a journey through a dark landscape with the soloist cast in the role of traveller across an ever-shifting orchestral terrain." She concluded, "It is a work as intriguing and evocative as it is approachable, even if at first hearing the shift into the light in the closing bars doesn’t quite convince."
