= Piano Concerto No. 3 (MacMillan) =

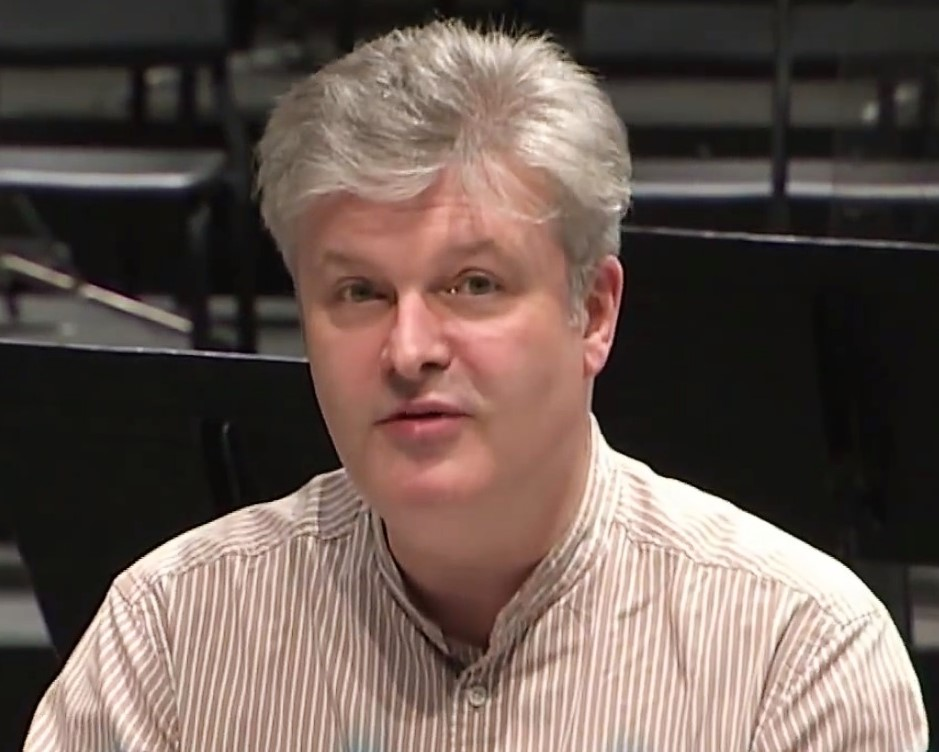
James MacMillan in 2012

The Concerto No. 3 for Piano and Orchestra "The Mysteries of Light" is the third piano concerto by the Scottish composer James MacMillan. The work was commissioned by the Minnesota Orchestra and was first performed on April 14, 2011, in Orchestra Hall, Minneapolis, by the pianist Jean-Yves Thibaudet and the Minnesota Orchestra under the conductor Osmo Vänskä.

== Composition ==
=== Background ===
MacMillan described the conception of the piece in the score program notes, writing:

My 3rd Piano Concerto, The Mysteries of Light, attempts to revive the ancient practice of writing music based on the structure of the Rosary. The most famous example of this is the collection of the Rosary (or Mystery) Sonatas for violin by Heinrich Biber, written in the late 17th century. These consist of 15 movements based on the Joyful, Sorrowful and Glorious Mysteries. In 2002 another set of meditations were introduced by John Paul II, the Luminous Mysteries, and these are the basis of the five sections of this concerto.

=== Structure ===
The Piano Concerto No. 3 has a duration of roughly 25 minutes and is composed in five connected sections:

1. Baptisma Iesu Christi
2. Miraculum in Cana
3. Proclamatio Regni Dei
4. Transfiguratio Domini Nostri
5. Institutio Eucharistiae

=== Instrumentation ===
The work is scored for solo piano and an orchestra comprising three flutes (3rd doubling piccolo), two oboes, cor anglais, three clarinets (3rd doubling bass clarinet), two bassoons, contrabassoon, four horns, three trumpets, three trombones (3rd on bass trombone), tuba, timpani, three percussionists, harp, and strings.

== Reception ==
Reviewing the world premiere, Larry Fuchsberg of the Star Tribune praised the concerto, writing, "The work, all 25 minutes of it, is a wild ride, overflowing with color and incident -- turbulent, incantatory and, at moments, luminous." Reviewing a 2013 performance of the work with the Atlanta Symphony Orchestra, Mark Gresham of ArtsATL described the piece as "virtuosic for both pianist and orchestra" and described the audience's overall reaction, remarking:

At the end, the audience seemed as divided as Congress. About one-third stood fairly quickly to applaud Thibaudet: those who came to hear him regardless of what he was playing. Others rose slowly in their wake, to add to accolades for Spano and the orchestra. But a significant minority of the audience decidedly did not stand; some near me quietly expressed to one another their dismay at MacMillan's music. It is in many ways a perplexing piece, demanding much of a listener despite all its fulgurant orchestration and expressive immediacy. One might suggest that it calls for emotional multitasking — and we know how difficult that can be in everyday life, much less in a concert hall.

Jay Nordlinger of The New Criterion also lauded the piece, writing, "Though only twenty-five minutes, the concerto felt a little long to me. Does it have a 'heavenly length,' as would befit a religious concerto? I'm not sure. I look forward to hearing the concerto again. What is beyond doubt is that James MacMillan is a serious composer who loves music and has important things to say. He does not write frivolously—except when frivolity is called for!—and he writes well."

== See also ==
- List of compositions by James MacMillan
