= Piano Concerto No. 2 (MacMillan) =

Composition by James MacMillan

The Piano Concerto No. 2 is a composition for solo piano and string orchestra by the Scottish composer James MacMillan. The work was commissioned by the New York City Ballet and was first performed at Lincoln Center for the Performing Arts on May 8, 2004, by the pianist Cameron Grant and the New York City Ballet Orchestra under MacMillan. The original ballet performance was choreographed by Christopher Wheeldon. The piece is dedicated in memory of the poet Edwin Muir.

== Composition ==
=== Background ===
The inception for the Piano Concerto No. 2 began when the English choreographer Christopher Wheeldon first approached MacMillan about expanding one of his compositions—1999's "Cumnock Fair" for string quintet—into a larger work fit for a ballet production. MacMillan subsequently wrote an adagio and fast finale that became the second and third movements, respectively. MacMillan described revisiting the piece in the score program notes, writing:

Cumnock Fair's original title was 'Hoodicraw Peden' who was Scotland's seventeenth century talibanesque covenanting 'hero' referred to in Edwin Muir's excoriating poem 'Scotland 1941'. Peden was infamous for the crow's mask he used to wear as he went about his zealotry in Cumnock and elsewhere in south-west Scotland. I decided to revisit the Muir poem for inspiration for the two new movements.

Additionally, the movement titles "Shambards" and "Shamnation" are made-up words based on the same poem by Edwin Muir.

=== Structure ===
The composition has a duration of roughly 30 minutes and is composed in three movements:

1. Cumnock Fair
2. Shambards
3. Shamnation

=== Instrumentation ===
The work is scored for solo piano and a string orchestra comprising first and second violins, violas, cellos, and double basses.

== Reception ==
Stephen Johnson of BBC Music Magazine gave the concerto moderate praise, saying it "has its moments of spellbound celebration, like the strings' imitation of improvised Gallic psalm-singing (one of the loveliest things in all folk music) in the central slow movement". Andrew Achenbach of Gramophone similarly lauded:

Scored for piano and strings, it is in three movements, the first of which, "Cumnock Fair", initially appeared in 1999. This fretful dance fantasy's original title, "Hoodicraw Peden", refers to a 17th-century Taliban-esque zealot, the subject of an Edwin Muir poem which witheringly refers to "Burns and Scott, sham bards of a sham nation", thereby providing the titles for the concerto's remaining movements. "Shambards" mockingly quotes the waltz from the Mad Scene in Lucia di Lammermoor while the lusty violin reel that launches "Shamnation" acquires an increasingly desperate energy as it hurtles giddily towards the piano's unhinged, unnerving final flourish.

== See also ==
- List of compositions by James MacMillan
