= Symphony No. 2 (MacMillan) =

The Symphony No. 2 is a symphony for chamber orchestra by the Scottish composer James MacMillan. It was first performed at Ayr Town Hall on 2 December 1999, by the Scottish Chamber Orchestra under MacMillan. The piece is dedicated to the writer and MacMillan's "fellow Ayrshireman" Andrew O'Hagan.

== Composition ==
The symphony has a duration of roughly 25 minutes and is composed in three numbered movements. The work is largely build upon MacMillan's 1985 Piano Sonata, about which the composer commented in the score program notes, writing, "The original is 'opened up' to new forms of expansion, sometimes according to colouristic potential, other times to dramatic or even originally unseen potential. Sometimes new layers are added, such as the march, sometimes material has been projected into new contexts."

=== Instrumentation ===
The work is scored for a chamber orchestra comprising two flutes (2nd doubling piccolo), two oboes (2nd doubling cor anglais), two clarinets (2nd doubling bass clarinet), bassoon, contrabassoon, two horns, trumpets, two percussionists, harp, and strings.

== Reception ==
Nicholas Williams of BBC Music Magazine praised the symphony as "adroitly focused" and wrote, "The unusual internal balance of parts, with a broad-backed second movement taking the strain, feels organically right."

== See also ==
- List of compositions by James MacMillan
