= Timotheus, Bacchus and Cecilia =

Composition for choir and orchestra by Sir James MacMillan

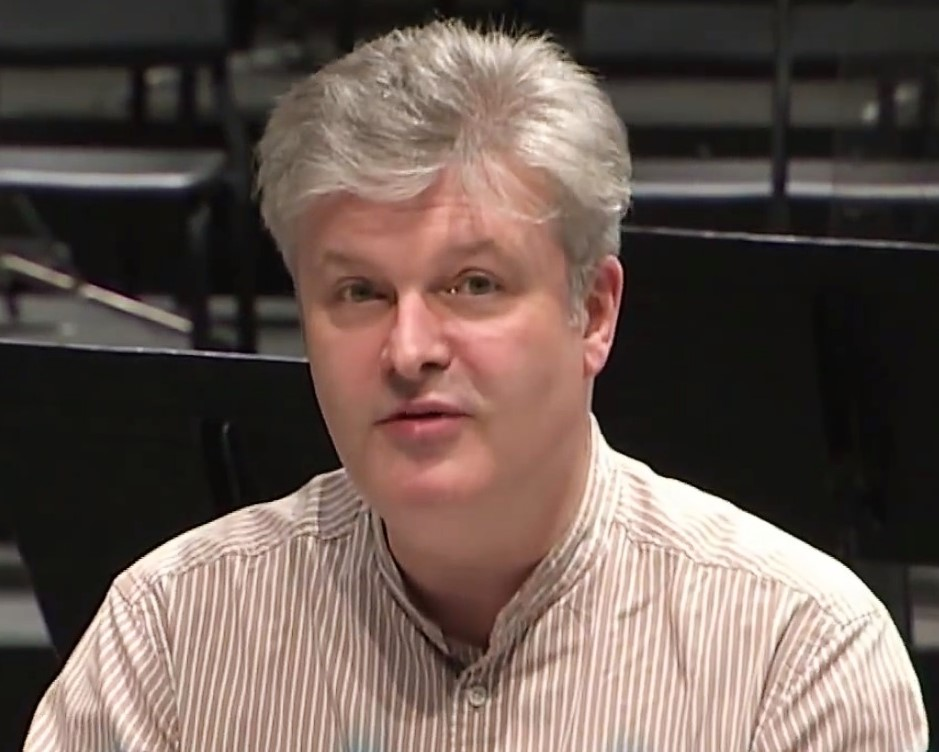
James MacMillan in 2012

Timotheus, Bacchus and Cecilia is a choral work for choir and orchestra by Scottish composer Sir James MacMillan, setting three verses of John Dryden's ode Alexander's Feast: Or the Power of Music. The European premieres of the work marked the end of Sir Mark Elder's time as chief conductor of the Hallé.

== Conception ==
The piece was commissioned jointly by the Hallé and Cincinnati Symphony to celebrate the close of Sir Mark Elder's tenure in charge of the Hallé. The work is dedicated to the composer's granddaughter Isabella Grace MacMillan.

== Composition ==
The piece lasts approximately 18 minutes, and is composed in three sections that run continuously. Each section paints the mood of the verse it sets. MacMillan, in his programme notes accompanying the score, said of the text that although it "is of another time and dimension I was struck by its breadth and ambition to explore the transformative nature of music from a number of different angles."

=== Structure ===
Section 1: We hear Timotheus, the musician who served the court of Alexander the Great and accompanied him on campaigns, inspiring heights of passion in the conquering monarch. The god Jove is so affected that he "stamps an image of himself, a sov'reign of the world," and we conclude that Alexander is himself Jove's stamp upon the world.

Section 2: References to Bacchus inspire celebration and feasting, but the music is dark and sombre: Dryden is explicitly describing Alexander's sack of Persepolis, when his soldiers, drunk on victory, rampaged through the city, visiting slaughter and destruction. The dark side of drunkenness is given to the basses of the chorus to evoke with the words "Drinking is the soldier's pleasure; Rich the treasure, sweet the pleasure, sweet is pleasure after pain."

Section 3: In response to section 2, the children ask St. Cecilia to pray for them, and the mood changes to rapt serenity, as the martyr and patron saint of music "enlarged the former narrow bounds, and added length to solemn sounds." In the end, Dryden questions who is more worthy of the crown of music: Timotheus, who "raised a mortal to the sky," or Cecilia, who "drew an angel down."

=== Instrumentation ===
The piece is scored for a large symphony orchestra which includes:

- Woodwinds: piccolo, 2 flutes, 2 oboes, cor anglais, 2 B♭ clarinets, 2 bassoons, contrabassoon
- Brass: 4 horns, 3 trumpets, 3 trombones, tuba
- Percussion: timpani, tubular bells/bongo (high)/cymbals (clashed); glockenspiel/bass drum; snare drum/tam-tam
- Harp, piano
- Strings

and three distinct choral groups:

- children's choir
- mixed chorus
- semichorus drawn from the mixed chorus, with younger voices preferred

== Reception ==
Rebecca Franks, writing in The Times, described the piece as "a full-blooded celebration of the power of music." She went on: "From ethereal heavenly voices to the echoes of war, no opportunity to paint drama in sound was missed and it all built to a terrific ending with chorus and orchestra at full tilt." Robert Beale of The Arts Desk said the work was "immediately attractive to the listener," and described it as being "thoroughly theatrical [...] full of striking effects, a showpiece for the combined [choral forces]"

== Performance history ==
- World premiere: Cincinnati, May 2023 Juanjo Mena, Cincinnati Symphony, May Festival Chorus / May Festival Youth Chorus
- European premiere: Manchester, June 2024 (performed on two consecutive nights due to demand) Mark Elder, Hallé Orchestra, Hallé Choir, Hallé Youth Choir, Hallé Children's Choir
- London premiere: Royal Albert Hall, July 2024 Mark Elder, Hallé Orchestra, Hallé Choir, Hallé Youth Choir, Hallé Children's Choir

== See also ==
- Musical settings of Alexander's Feast
