= Oboe Concerto (MacMillan) =

2010 oboe concerto by James MacMillan

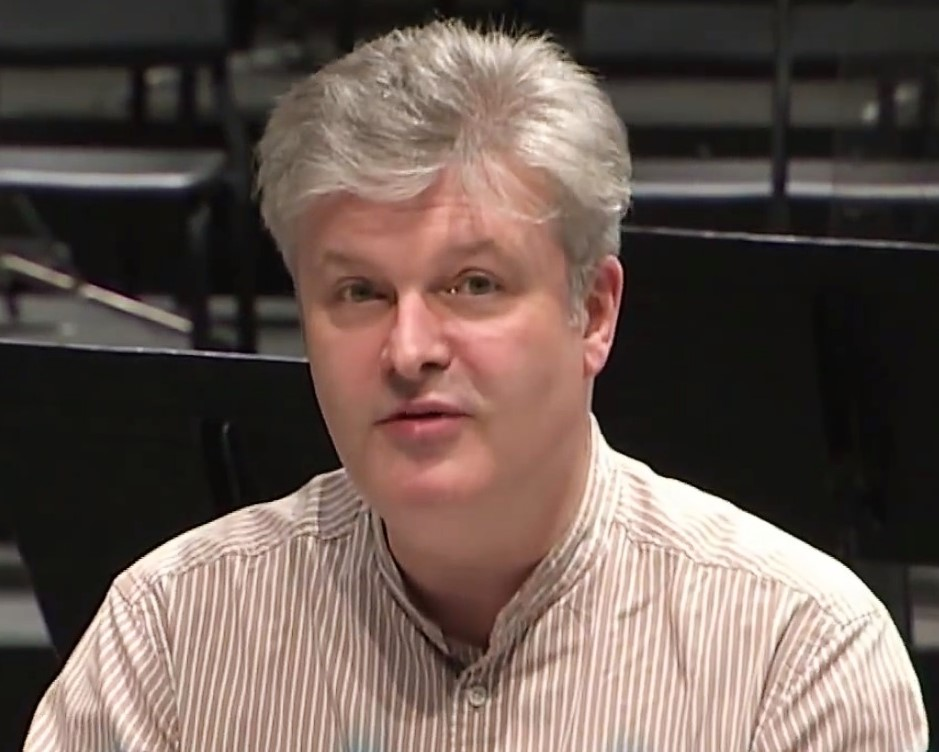
James MacMillan in 2012

The Oboe Concerto is a composition for solo oboe and orchestra by the Scottish composer James MacMillan. The work was commissioned by the Britten Sinfonia and was first performed at the Birmingham Town Hall on 15 October 2010 by the oboist Nicholas Daniel and the Britten Sinfonia under MacMillan. The Oboe Concerto piece is dedicated to Nicholas Daniel and the Britten Sinfonia.

== Composition ==
The Oboe Concerto has a duration of roughly 23 minutes and is composed in three numbered movements. MacMillan described the movements in the score programme notes, writing:

The first opens with a gradual building up of rhythmic layers on violas, bassoon and trumpet before the soloist joins in. Suddenly the music is thrown forward by a metrical modulation and becomes very fast, flighty and virtuosic. Structurally, the music eventually goes into reverse before a solemn coda.

The second movement is based on an earlier work for solo oboe, in angustiis... The solo material is expressive and sad, and enters into much dialogue with other wind instruments throughout. The reflective character of the movement is interrupted by little dyadic patterns, various pizzicato outbursts, some scherzo-like material and agitated faster passages, but the principal mood is introverted and cantabile.

The last movement begins brashly and has a clownish character. The overall feeling is extrovert and dramatic, showing off the oboe in fast display. Some of the original ideas from the opening movement are re-introduced in new guises, before an exultant and joyous ending.

=== Instrumentation ===
The work is scored for solo oboe and an orchestra comprising two flutes, cor anglais, two clarinets, bassoon, contrabassoon, two horns, two trumpets, timpani, and strings.

== Reception ==
David Honigmann of the Financial Times highly praised the concerto, saying, "Oboists may feel ruefully that musical history owes them a showpiece. They have one now: James MacMillan's Oboe Concerto turns the soloist into a nimble-footed musical athlete, a star opera singer, a dazzling Highland dancer, all in the space of three varied movements." Warwick Arnold of Limelight similarly described the piece as "a bold virtuosic work that should prove popular with both players and audiences." Michael Dervan of The Irish Times further wrote:

The Scottish and Irish traditional music influences in James MacMillan's 2012 short orchestral monody, One, provide an effective link to the same composer's 2010 Oboe Concerto. Here, the outer movements echo some of the frolicking of the Vaughan Williams (concerto), though in a fully contemporary way. The piece's heart is an intense, keening Largo, developing material written in the wake of the 9/11 attacks. The always-inspirational Nicholas Daniel, for whom it was written, rates it as more difficult than the concerto by Elliott Carter.

== See also ==
- List of compositions by James MacMillan
