= Wayne Marshall (classical musician) =

British pianist, organist, and conductor (born 1961)

Wayne Marshall OBE
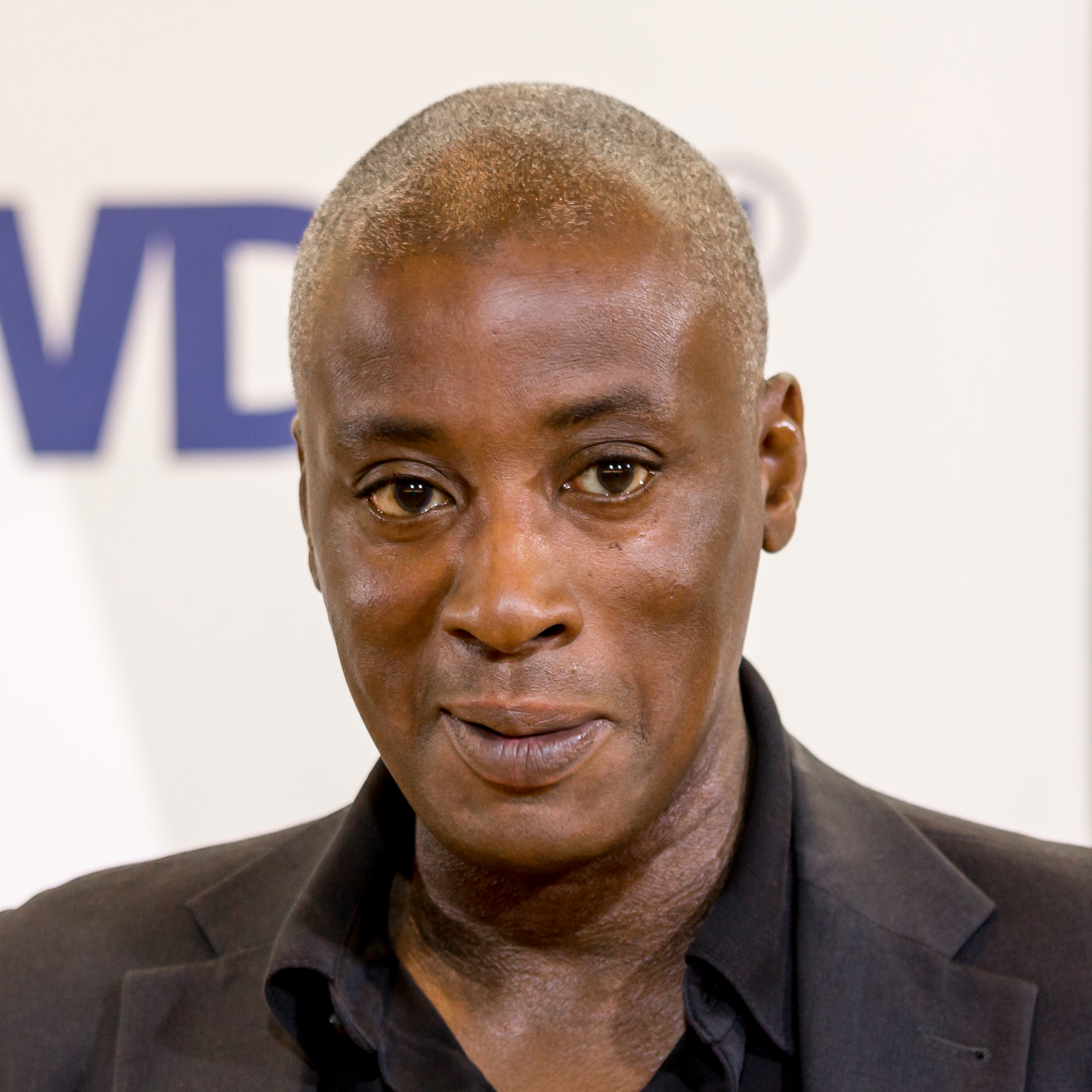
- Wayne Marshall in 2014

Background information
- Born: 13 January 1961 (age 65); Oldham, Lancashire
- Occupations: Pianist; Organist; Conductor
- Website: waynemarshall.com

Wayne Ea Marshall OBE (born 13 January 1961) is a British pianist, organist, and conductor.

== Biography ==
Marshall was born in Oldham, Lancashire, to parents originally from Barbados. He began piano studies at the age of three, and heard organ music regularly as a child through Sunday church services, which initiated his interest in the organ. He was a student at Chetham's School of Music, Manchester, from 1971 to 1979. Marshall continued his music studies at the Royal College of Music, where he held a Foundation scholarship, and was in parallel an Organ Scholar at St George's Chapel, Windsor Castle. He did post-graduate studies at the Hochschule für Musik in Vienna from 1983-1984.

As an organist, Marshall has served as organist and associate artist of the Bridgewater Hall, Manchester. In 2004, he gave the inaugural organ recital in the new Walt Disney Concert Hall, Los Angeles. Also in Los Angeles, in October 2004, he premiered James MacMillan's organ concerto A Scotch Bestiary with the Los Angeles Philharmonic Orchestra under Esa-Pekka Salonen. Marshall has appeared as an organist at the BBC Proms.

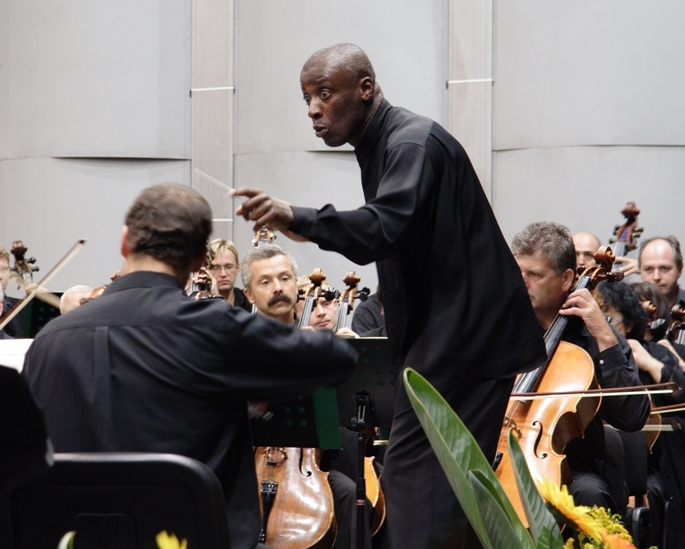
Wayne Marshall conducting the Brno Philharmonic Orchestra at Špilberk Festival, Brno, in 2006.

As a conductor, Marshall has held such posts as principal guest conductor of the Orchestra Sinfonica di Milano Giuseppe Verdi, beginning in 2007. Marshall was chief conductor of the WDR Funkhausorchester from 2014 to 2020. Marshall conducted the first concert of the Chineke! Orchestra, Europe's first professional black and ethnic minority orchestra, at the Queen Elizabeth Hall in London in September 2015. His work with contemporary music has included conducting the European premiere of John Harbison's opera The Great Gatsby at the Semperoper, Dresden on 6 December 2015.

== Honours and awards ==
In 2004, Marshall received an Honorary Doctorate from Bournemouth University. He became a Fellow of the Royal College of Music in 2010. In October 2016, he was one of the recipients of the Barbados Golden Jubilee Award, for his services to music.

Marshall was appointed Officer of the Order of the British Empire (OBE) in the 2021 New Year Honours for services to music.

== Selected discography ==
- Show Boat (1988)
- The Virtuoso Organist (1990)
- Gershwin: Second Rhapsody; Piano Concerto in F; Porgy & Bess Symphonic Suite (1995)
- Gershwin: Rhapsody in blue; I got rhythm; An American in Paris (1995)
- Gershwin: Songbook & Improvisations (1997)
- I Got Rhythm: Wayne Marshall Plays Gershwin (1997)
- The Most Unforgettable Organ Classics Ever (1998)
- Symphonie (1998)
- Wayne Marshall Plays Bach, Liszt, Brahms (1998)
- Grainger: Works for Piano (1999)
- Swing It! (1999)
- Organ Improvisations (1999)
- Two of a Kind (2000)
- Gershwin: Rhapsody in Blue; An American in Paris; Piano Concerto; Porgy & Bess (2002)
- Organ Works; Organ Transcriptions (2003)
- Popular Pieces for Trumpet and Organ (2005)
- Gershwin: Rhapsody in Blue; Concerto in F; Porgy and Bess Suite (2005)
- Gershwin: Rhapsody in Blue; Piano Concerto; An American in Paris; Porgy and Bess Suite (2005)
- Wedding Favourites (2005)
- James Macmillan: A Scotch Bestiary; Piano Concerto No. 2 (2006)
- Blues (2006)
- George Gershwin: Concerto in F; Variations on 'I Got Rhythm'; Song Improvisations (2010)
- Rhapsody in Swing (2012)
- John Rutter: The Piano Collection (2020)
- Wayne Marshall: Passion Symphony (2020) Base2 Music

Cultural offices
Preceded by Niklas Willén	Chief Conductor, WDR Funkhausorchester Köln; 2014–2020	Succeeded by Frank Strobel
