= The Berserking =

The Berserking is a concerto for solo piano and orchestra by the Scottish composer James MacMillan. The work was commissioned by the Musica Nova Festival and was premiered in Glasgow on 22 September 1990 by the pianist Peter Donohoe and the Royal Scottish National Orchestra under the conductor Matthias Bamert.

== Composition ==
=== Title and inspiration ===
The Berserkers was inspired by a group of Norse warriors called Berserkers, who were reported to have fought in an uncontrollable, trance-like fury. MacMillan wrote in the score program note:

Although deadly in combat, the berserking process was paradoxically a suicidal one since, having lost their senses, they were vulnerable to a more stealthy attack. As a Scot living in the modern world this behaviour seems very familiar! I see its pointlessness as resembling the Scots' seeming facility for shooting themselves in the foot in political and, for that matter, in sporting endeavours. (In fact the initial burst of inspiration for The Berserking came in 1989 after watching a soccer game in which Glasgow Celtic turned in a characteristically passionate, frenzied but ultimately futile display against Partizan Belgrade!).

=== Structure ===
The Berserkers has a duration of roughly 33 minutes and is composed in one continuous movement of three connected sections. MacMillan described the form of the piece, writing:

...this piano concerto is not programme music. Instead, the abstract subject matter (in this case misplaced energy) has become the defining element in the work's material and structure. In the opening section there is a sense of swaggering futility in the way the energy is "misdirected" into climaxes without resolutions and maintained in a continual state of hyper-activity and excess. The middle section is slow, reflective and delicate and has a simple verse and refrain structure like a folksong, creating an aura of traditional Scottish music. The relationship between soloist and orchestra changes from section to section. In the opening fast music they are in argument and opposition most of the time, each striving to dominate. In the slow section the piano is very much to the fore and in the final quick section they become equal partners, much of the time in unison and with frequent interlocking of fragments. The final section eventually reaches a more "meaningful" resolution. After the final climax there emerges something apparently new in piano, celeste and harp; but one can hear the contours of the melodic material from the slow section. The Celtic folk influence returns to leave its mark in the serenity of the final coda.

=== Instrumentation ===
The work is scored for solo piano and an orchestra comprising two flutes, piccolo, three oboes (3rd doubling cor anglais), three clarinets (3rd doubling bass clarinet), two bassoons, contrabassoon, four horns, three trumpets, two trombones, bass trombone, tuba, timpani, three percussionists, celesta, harp, and strings.

== Reception ==
The Berserking received a very positive response from critics. Reviewing a recording of the composition, Andrew Clements of The Guardian wrote:

The Berserking is a piano concerto in everything but name, and a big-boned one at that - half an hour of music in three linked movements. The starting point was a Celtic football match, in which the team produced, in MacMillan's words, "a characteristically passionate, frenzied but ultimately futile display". From that he extended the image to the ancient Celtic warriors, the Berserkers, who would work themselves up for a battle in a similarly unfocused way. That swaggering drive fuels the first movement, while the cool, collected centrepiece is an evocation of Celtic folk music and Hebridean psalmody before the macho energy returns again.

Stephen Johnson of BBC Music Magazine similarly lauded the piece, writing, "The progression from testosterone-fuelled strutting and stamping to sensuous lyrical calm emerges with clarity and drama."

In 2009, the British journalist Simon Heffer declared it "the greatest piece of music written in these islands since the death of Benjamin Britten in 1976." He added, "But what is so marvellous is that its composer is still alive, still creating, and there could yet be even better to come."
