= Who shall separate us? =

Choral composition by James MacMillan

- Anthem by James MacMillan
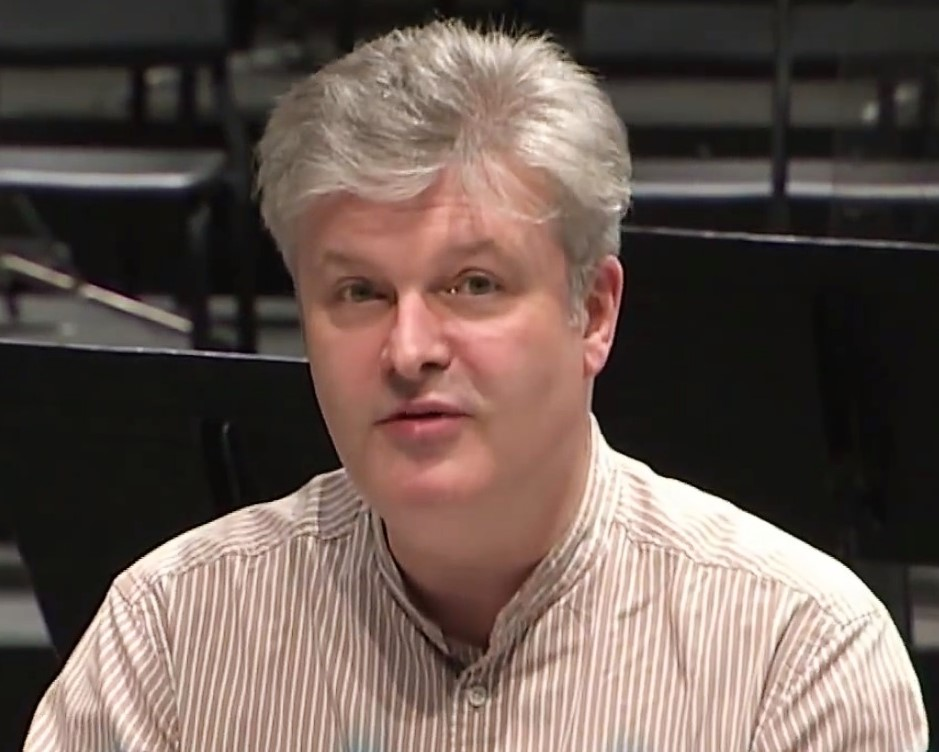
- MacMillan in 2012
- Occasion: State funeral of Elizabeth II
- Text: Romans 8:35a, 38b–end
- Language: English
- Composed: 2012
- Performed: 19 September 2022: Westminster Abbey
- Scoring: choir a cappella

"Who shall separate us?" is a composition for an eight-part choir a cappella by James MacMillan, setting a passage from the Epistle to the Romans to music. It was commissioned for the state funeral of Elizabeth II, and was first performed at Westminster Abbey on 19 September 2022 by choirs conducted by James O'Donnell.

== History ==
Elizabeth II originally personally commissioned James MacMillan in 2011 to write a piece of music for her funeral.

MacMillan was commissioned by the Dean and Chapter of Westminster to prepare the piece for the state funeral of Elizabeth II, which was held on 19 September 2022. The commission, for an Anglican service, was regarded as a surprise, as he is "now possibly the best-known Catholic composer in the world", but he is known as a "masterly composer of small-scale religious choral pieces" such as a setting of a poem by Henry Vaughan. The composer said that he was "deeply honoured" by the commission. He wrote the composition in 2011/12.

For the anthem, he set verses from chapter 8 of the Epistle to the Romans, beginning "Who shall separate us from the love of Christ?", with an added "Alleluia! Amen". The work is scored for eight voices a cappella (SSAATTBB). It was published by Boosey & Hawkes.

The anthem was first performed during the ceremony at Westminster Abbey, immediately before the blessing, by the choir of Westminster Abbey and the choir of the Chapel Royal, conducted by James O'Donnell, the music director of Westminster Abbey.

== Text ==
The text from the King James Version of the Bible, taken from the end of chapter 8 of the letter to the Romans, verses 35a and 38b and 39, reads:

- 35 Who shall separate us from the love of Christ?
- 38 Neither death, nor life, nor angels, nor principalities, nor powers, nor things present, nor things to come,
- 39 nor height, nor depth, nor any other creature, shall be able to separate us from the love of God, which is in Christ Jesus our Lord.

The text is followed by Alleluia! and Amen.

== Reception ==
Tim Ashley from The Guardian wrote about the performance: "... his anthem opening with upper voices hovering over a sustained bass drone, before the music escalates towards a sequence of ecstatic alleluias and comes to rest on a quiet Amen." Jeremy Reynolds from the Pittsburgh Post-Gazette called it a "powerful, earthy anthem" in which "higher voices floated ethereally over a chasmic bass". He continued: "Alleluias followed, burning bright sonic trails before settling and resting with chords of utter tranquility."
