= Quickening (MacMillan) =

Quickening is a cantata for countertenor, two tenors, two baritones, children's choir, chorus, and orchestra by the Scottish composer James MacMillan. The work was co-commissioned by The Proms and the Philadelphia Orchestra and was completed in 1998. Its world premiere was performed by the Hilliard Ensemble, the BBC Symphony Orchestra & Chorus, and the Westminster Cathedral Boys' Choir under the direction of Andrew Davis at Royal Albert Hall, London, on 5 September 1999. The journalist Damian Thompson of The Spectator described it as "one of MacMillan's masterpieces."

== Composition ==
=== Background ===
Quickening is set to text by the British poet and frequent MacMillan collaborator Michael Symmons Roberts. It is written in Aramaic and English, but also features the use of glossolalia (speaking in tongues). The religious theme of the work draws upon the phenomenon of childbirth, with a boys' choir particularly used to evoke the journey of an unborn child.

=== Structure ===
The piece has a duration of roughly 48 minutes and is composed in four movements:

1. Incarnadine
2. Midwife
3. Poppies
4. Living Water

=== Instrumentation ===
The work is scored for a countertenor, two tenors, baritone, children's choir, SATB chorus, and a large orchestra consisting of two flutes, piccolo, three oboes (3rd doubling cor anglais), three clarinets (3rd doubling bass clarinet), two bassoons, contrabassoon, four horns, four trumpets, three trombones, tuba, timpani, four percussionists, harp, piano (doubling celesta), chamber organ, grand organ (or synthesizer), and strings.

== Reception ==
Quickening has been highly praised by many music critics. Reviewing the United States premiere in Philadelphia, Peter Dobrin of The Philadelphia Inquirer wrote, "The best thing about Quickening – one of the orchestra's centennial commissions – is that it is very much of our time. MacMillan's musical language is all his own, and the emotional message behind it speaks for this era in a way that very few works do. It's chaotic, vaguely spiritual, obstreperous, and full of simultaneously conflicting messages about what we should be feeling." Despite noting that "a lot of the concrete associations [MacMillan] tries to get across in the piece didn't ring true" with him, Dobrin concluded, "But music doesn't need, or even always benefit from, a tangible relationship with real life. The pure sonic experience is more than enough reason to justify the investment of mental adrenaline needed to listen."

John von Rhein of the Chicago Tribune later described the piece as an "arresting meditation" and wrote, "None of MacMillan's effects come across as meretricious, certainly not the murmurous Babel of mixed choral voices at the beginning or the magical hush of 'unborn' children's voices with solo violin at the end. Those two sections, 'Incarnadine' and 'Living Waters,' frame two darker central tableaux, 'Midwife' and 'Poppies,' that erupt in spasms of orchestral agitation undergirding powerful surges of choral declamation." Lawrence A. Johnson of the Chicago Classical Review similarly remarked, "Quickening is a big, complex and multifaceted work with a lot to take in at first hearing. MacMillan's distinctive brand of musical 'muscular Christianity' is here at his most flamboyant and audacious, with largely successful results. The composer wields his vast forces with skill and panache, particularly in his writing for brass and his favored percussion, often making a dazzling and brilliant effect." Andrew Achenbach of Gramophone called it, "A powerful experience, in sum, and a work well worth getting to know."

Putting a contrary view (reviewing the work's première) was John Allison in The Times, who found the work "..."big" only in terms of its duration and the vast forces it employs: the absence of developed, large-scale ideas in MacMillan's music is becoming a worrying trend...". Allison went on to say that "the score is no greater than the sum of its parts: acclaim has come easily to MacMillan, but now it is surely time for less self-indulgence".

== Recording ==
A recording of Quickening was released through Chandos Records on 27 January 2009. The recording was performed by the Hilliard Ensemble, the CBSO Chorus & youth chorus, and the BBC Philharmonic under the direction of MacMillan.
