= A European Requiem =

Composition by James MacMillan

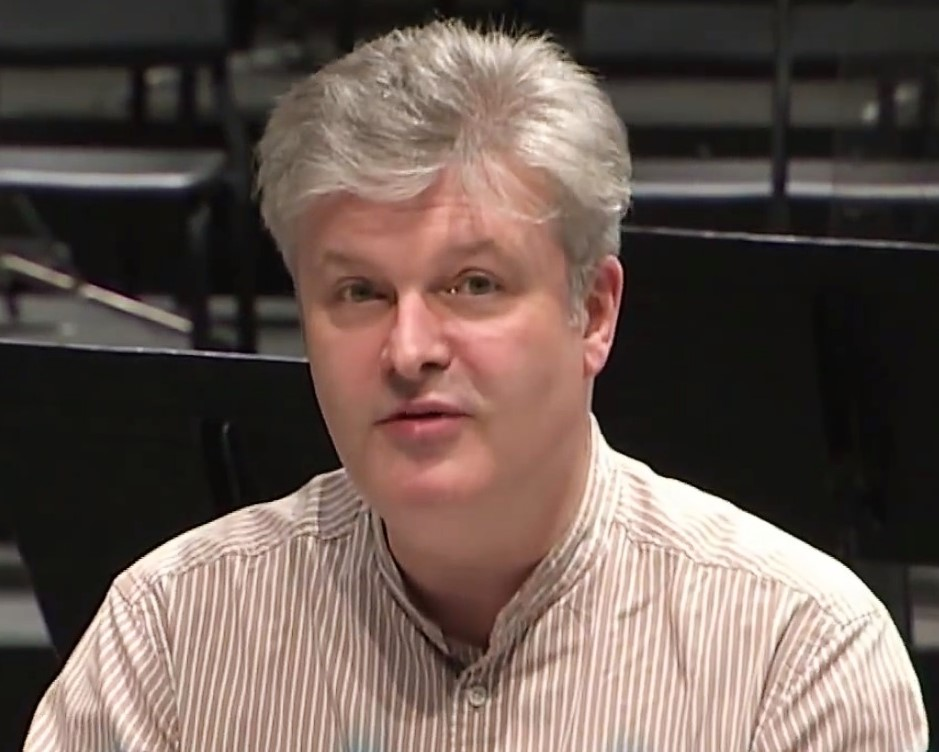
James MacMillan in 2012

A European Requiem is a composition for countertenor (or alto), baritone, mixed chorus, and orchestra by the Scottish composer James MacMillan. The work was commissioned by the Oregon Bach Festival, partially supported by an award from the National Endowment for the Arts. It was first performed by the countertenor Christopher Ainslie, the baritone Morgan Smith, the Berwick Chorus of the Oregon Bach Festival, and the Oregon Bach Festival Orchestra under the direction of Matthew Halls on 2 July 2016, at the Hult Center for the Performing Arts in Eugene, Oregon.

== Composition ==
A European Requiem has a performance duration of roughly 43 minutes and is cast in one continuous movement, with sections of text separated by instrumental episodes. In the score program note, the composer wrote, "The concert Requiem, as it developed from the 19th century, is a particularly European form that composers have turned to when they identify with a sense of loss, often as much within themselves, as prompted by a specific death. That is the case with my work, which is not a memorial for a loved one but rather a general response to this vivid text, coloured by a realism and wistfulness at the passing of deep cultural resonances."

The text is written entirely in Latin, which represented for MacMillan "the common European language that existed before nationalist barriers were erected." He added, "Setting texts in Latin may now seem counter-cultural to many, but for me it represents the ideal rediscovering of our common heritage."

=== Instrumentation ===
The work is scored for a countertenor (or alto) and baritone soli, mixed chorus, and an orchestra comprising two flutes, oboe, cor anglais, two clarinets (2nd doubling bass clarinet), bassoon, contrabassoon, four horns, three trumpets, three trombones, tuba, timpani, three percussionists, harp, and strings.

== Reception ==
=== UK ===
Reviewing the work's U.K. premiere at The Proms in 2017, several critics noted the music's bleak sound and its performance coinciding with the immediate aftermath of the Brexit referendum. Stephen Pritchard of The Guardian observed, "MacMillan writes melismatic, quasi-oriental vocal lines that work hypnotically when assigned to soloists, but less so when sung by large forces. Several moments of imprecision crept into the spinning descent of the Kyrie, for instance. Baritone Jacques Imbrailo was implacable in the Domine Jesu Christe and countertenor Iestyn Davies plangent in the beautiful Lux aeterna, but there was precious little music of consolation in this bleak requiem. The stock-still calm of the Agnus Dei allowed a moment of reflection, but the closing chorus offered only a cold, diminishing drumbeat towards oblivion. Rather like the Remain view of Brexit." Alexandra Coghlan of i similarly reflected, "This is a Requiem for our troubled times, a lament for the cultural idea of Europe, rather than the continent itself. We have no right to ask for something sweeter, though it would be nice if future performances gave us a chorus less timid and beat-shy, capable of finding the shock and awe as well as the sadness in this major new work."

Richard Fairman of the Financial Times was more critical of the work, writing, "Over 40 minutes it sets some, though not all, of the familiar text of the Requiem Mass. Even that, however, starts to seem too much. Typically bold MacMillan ideas come and go at speed, impatiently punctuating what should be a sustained atmosphere." He added, "The music was at its most persuasive when it settles down. A haunting 'Kyrie eleison', beautifully sung by countertenor Iestyn Davies, established a memorably lamenting tone. A softly murmured choral 'Agnus Dei' held time still. The closing 'In paradisum', inflected by plainchant, faded out in an orchestral shimmer. Like too much else, that was gone before it could make its effect." However, Damian Thompson of The Spectator described it as "a piece of gloriously subversive new music." Aaron Davies described the London performance as "underwhelming"
