= Cello Concerto (MacMillan) =

1996 composition by James MacMillan

The Cello Concerto is a composition for solo cello and orchestra by the Scottish composer James MacMillan. It is the second of three interrelated compositions in MacMillan's Easter triptych Triduum commissioned by the London Symphony Orchestra. The piece was first performed at the Barbican Centre on October 3, 1996, by the cellist Mstislav Rostropovich and the London Symphony Orchestra under the conductor Colin Davis. The work is dedicated to Mstislav Rostropovich.

== Composition ==
The Cello Concerto has a duration of roughly 41 minutes and is composed in three movements:

1. The Mockery
2. The Reproaches
3. Dearest Wood and Dearest Iron

=== Instrumentation ===
The work is composed for solo cello and an orchestra comprising two flutes (2nd doubling piccolo), two oboes, two clarinets, (2nd doubling E-flat clarinet and bass clarinet), bassoon, contrabassoon, four horns, three trumpets, three trombones, tuba, timpani, three percussionists, piano (doubling celesta), harp, and strings.

== Reception ==
Robert Cowan of The Independent wrote, "MacMillan's Concerto extends the 'dialogue of extremes' that has proved a pivotal aspect of his earlier work. It opens with a bang, and keeps the soloist busily employed virtually for the duration. It is, in a word, a 'real' Cello Concerto - lyrical, combative, rich in dialogue and scored with a skill that suggests innovative imagination and a marked respect for tradition." BBC Music Magazine also praised the concerto, writing, "One may feel that some of the effects MacMillan uses – the overlaid screaming brass fanfares, the extensive use of percussion – are excessive, but they are contained within a tautly argued, tightly structured whole, and possessed of a thrillingly direct – and profoundly affecting – musicality. I defy anyone not to be moved by this music, whether for its considerable emotional impact or purely the artistry of its musical structures." Arnold Whittall of Gramophone further opined:

In the Cello Concerto, which continues the drama of conflict between a suffering individual and an oppressive society on a much larger scale, Raphael Wallfisch has a harder time in asserting a suitably charismatic presence, and might have benefited from a slightly more forward placement. As it is, MacMillian’s imaginative orchestral writing threatens to get the best of the purely musical argument: yet it is still difficult not to be moved by the sense of a struggling protagonist, condemned and tortured. The point might be more effectively conveyed in music of greater formal economy (as in MacMillan's much admired Ustvolskaya) but the composer's very direct and uninhibited expressionism shows his determination not to downplay either the portentousness or the horror of what the music contemplates.

== See also ==
- List of compositions by James MacMillan
