= The Confession of Isobel Gowdie =

Orchestral piece

The Confession of Isobel Gowdie is a work for large symphony orchestra by the Scottish composer James MacMillan.

It is, according to the composer, a Requiem for one Isobel Gowdie, supposedly burnt as a witch in post-Reformation Scotland. Despite the work's depiction of the violent torture and execution of Gowdie, it is actually thought that no torture took place prior to her confession; although it is likely she was executed in 1662 no records exist to confirm it.

It was written in 1990 and premiered at that year's Proms concerts in London. It was an instant success, receiving, according to the critic Stephen Johnson, "an ovation the like of which had rarely been seen at a British premiere since the death of Benjamin Britten".

The work falls into three major sections: an opening, elegiac string section, followed by a violent middle part (according to Johnson, redolent of "trial, torture or mass hysteria") followed by a return to the more subdued atmosphere of the opening for strings, but this time punctuated by violent outbursts from the full orchestra. It resolves on one note, in a massive crescendo to fffff which bears the hallmark of a similar motif in Alban Berg's Wozzeck.

The work was premiered by the BBC Scottish Symphony Orchestra, under Jerzy Maksymiuk, who later recorded it. It has been performed and recorded many times since, including repeat performances by the BBC SSO, and the RSAMD Symphony Orchestra in the composer's 50th birthday celebrations.

== Instrumentation ==
The Confession of Isobel Gowdie is scored for the following orchestra:

8 Woodwinds

- 2 Flutes (2nd doubling Piccolo)
- 2 Oboes (2nd doubling Cor Anglais)
- 2 Clarinets in B♭ (2nd doubling Bass Clarinet)
- 2 Bassoons (2nd doubling Contrabassoon)

11 Brass

- 4 Horns in F
- 3 Trumpets in C
- 2 Trombones
- Bass Trombone
- Tuba

Timpani

2 Percussion

1. 2 Congas (high, low), 2 Timbales (high, low), Xylophone, 3 Tam-tams (small, medium, large), Anvil, Tubular bells
2. Snare drum, 2 Congas (high, low), Vibraphone, Bass drum, very large tam-tam
- (The 2 players are to be as far apart as possible to enhance the antiphonal effects.)

Strings
