= Perth Concert Hall (Scotland) =

Concert hall in Perth, Scotland

Coordinates: 56°23′50″N 3°25′54″W

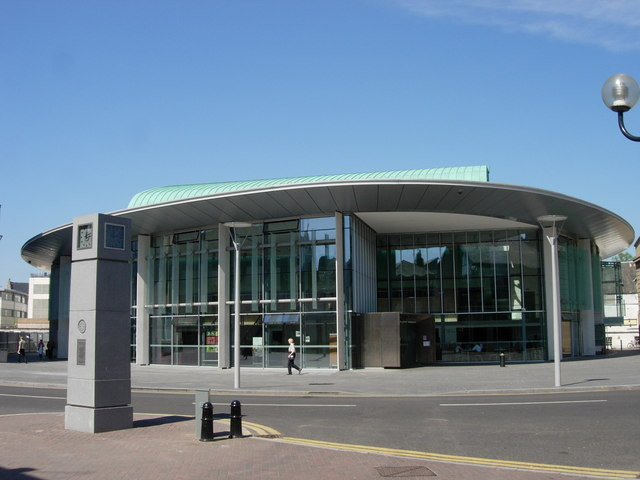
- Front and Entrance of Perth Concert Hall
- Interactive map of Perth Concert Hall
- Address: Mill Street PH1 5HZ; Perth, Scotland
- Owner: Perth & Kinross Council
- Operator: Horsecross Arts Ltd
- Capacity: 1,200 (Main Auditorium); 120 (Norie-Miller Studio)
- Type: Concert hall

Construction
- Opened: 2005 (21 years ago)
- Years active: 2005–Present

Website
- www.horsecross.co.uk

Perth Concert Hall is an events centre which hosts a programme of concerts, performances and contemporary art in Perth, Scotland.

== Architecture ==
The building, designed by BDP Glasgow, was built in steel and glass at a construction cost of £12.3m, and was opened by Queen Elizabeth II in 2005.

== Auditorium ==
At the heart of the Perth Concert Hall building is a fully flexible 1,000 seat concert hall, the Gannochy Auditorium. The hall was clad in concrete with Swiss acoustic timber panels at the back of the stage. It features a shallow gallery.

It was highly commended for the Scottish Design Awards for Best Building for Public Use in 2007.
