= James MacMillan =

Scottish composer and conductor

Sir James MacMillan KT CBE FRSE
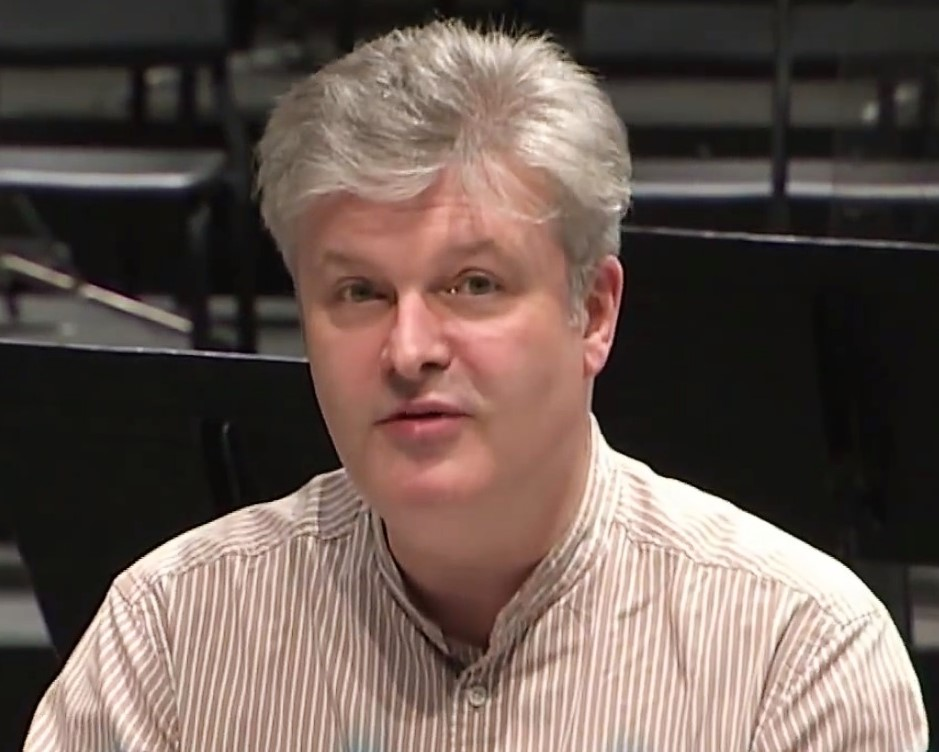
- MacMillan at the 2012 Cabrillo Festival of Contemporary Music
- Born: 16 July 1959 (age 67); Kilwinning, Scotland
- Education: University of Edinburgh (BMus); University of Durham (PhD)
- Occupations: Conductor; Composer
- Organizations: BBC Philharmonic
- Awards: Order of the Thistle; British Composer Award; Knight Bachelor

Sir James Loy MacMillan (born 16 July 1959) is a Scottish classical composer and conductor.

== Early life and education ==
MacMillan was born at Kilwinning, in North Ayrshire, but lived in the East Ayrshire town of Cumnock until 1977. His father is James MacMillan, a carpenter, and his mother is Ellen MacMillan (née Loy).

He studied musical composition at the University of Edinburgh with Rita McAllister and Kenneth Leighton, obtaining a BMus degree in 1981, and later at Durham University with John Casken, where he completed a PhD degree in Composition in 1987. At Durham he was a member of the College of St Hild and St Bede as an undergraduate student and the Graduate Society while studying for his doctorate. He was a lecturer in music at the Victoria University of Manchester from 1986 to 1988. After his studies, MacMillan returned to Scotland, composing prolifically, and becoming Associate Composer with the Scottish Chamber Orchestra, often working on education projects. As a young man he was briefly a member of the Young Communist League.

== Career ==
He came to the attention of the classical establishment with the BBC Scottish Symphony Orchestra's premiere of The Confession of Isobel Gowdie at the BBC Proms in 1990. Isobel Gowdie was one of many women executed for witchcraft in 17th-century Scotland. According to the composer, "On behalf of the Scottish people the work craves absolution and offers Isobel Gowdie the mercy and humanity that was denied her in the last days of her life."

The work's international acclaim spurred more high-profile commissions, including a percussion concerto for fellow Scot Evelyn Glennie: Veni, Veni, Emmanuel. It was premiered in 1992 and has become MacMillan's most performed work. He was also asked by Mstislav Rostropovich to compose his Cello Concerto, which Rostropovich premiered in 1997.

MacMillan was composer and conductor with the BBC Philharmonic from 2000 to 2009, following which he took up a position as principal guest conductor with the Netherlands Radio Chamber Philharmonic. His collaboration with Michael Symmons Roberts continued with his second opera, The Sacrifice (based on the ancient Welsh tales of the Mabinogion), premiered by Welsh National Opera in 2007. Sundogs, a large-scale work for a cappella choir, also using text by Symmons Roberts, was premiered by the Indiana University Contemporary Vocal Ensemble in 2006.

Further successes have included the St John Passion jointly commissioned by the London Symphony Orchestra and Boston Symphony Orchestra and conducted by Sir Colin Davis at its world premiere in 2008.

== Influences ==
MacMillan's music is infused with the spiritual and the political. His Catholic faith has inspired many of his sacred works, including a Magnificat (1999) and several Masses. This central strand of his life and compositions was marked by the BBC Symphony Orchestra in 2005, with a survey of his music titled From Darkness into Light. MacMillan and his wife are lay Dominicans, and he has collaborated with Michael Symmons Roberts, a Catholic poet.

MacMillan has also collaborated with Rowan Williams, then the Anglican Archbishop of Canterbury. Perhaps his most political work is Cantos Sagrados (1990), a setting of Latin American poetry by Ariel Dorfman and Ana Maria Mendoza, combining elements of liberation theology with more conventional religious texts. MacMillan said that his aim in writing this work was to emphasise 'a deeper solidarity with the poor of that subcontinent' in the context of political repression.

Scottish traditional music has also had a profound musical influence, and is frequently discernible in his works. When the Scottish Parliament reconvened in 1999 after 292 years, a fanfare by MacMillan accompanied Elizabeth II into the parliamentary chamber. Weeks after the opening ceremony, MacMillan launched a vigorous attack on sectarianism in Scotland, particularly anti-Catholicism, in a speech titled "Scotland's Shame".

His choral work Mass (2000) was commissioned by Westminster Cathedral and contains sections which the congregation may join in singing. Similarly, the St Anne's Mass and Galloway Mass do not require advanced musicianship, being designed to be taught to a congregation.

One of his most important commissions (by the Catholic Bishops' Conference of England & Wales and of Scotland) was for a new Mass setting for choir and congregation to be sung at two of the three Masses Pope Benedict XVI celebrated during his apostolic and state visit to Great Britain in 2010. First sung at Mass at Bellahouston Park, Glasgow, on 16 September, it was sung again at the Mass and beatification of John Henry Newman at Cofton Park, Birmingham, on 19 September. MacMillan was also commissioned to write a setting of the text Tu es Petrus (Matthew 16:18) for the Pope's entry at Mass at Westminster Cathedral on 18 September.

BBC Radio 4 broadcast in 2020–2021 Faith in Music, Macmillan's examination of religious faith in the work of seven composers from Thomas Tallis to Leonard Bernstein.

== Honours and fellowships ==
MacMillan and his wife are lay Dominicans, i.e. members of the Third Order of Saint Dominic, a relationship that began during his undergraduate years at Edinburgh.

He is an honorary fellow of Blackfriars Hall, University of Oxford, and Professor of Theology, Imagination, and the Arts at St Mary's College, St Andrews. He is one of the patrons of St Mary's Music School in Edinburgh, the London Oratory School Schola, The British Art Music Series, and of the Schola Cantorum of the Cardinal Vaughan Memorial School.

MacMillan was appointed a Commander of the Order of the British Empire (CBE) in the 2004 New Year Honours for services to Music. With his second opera The Sacrifice, he won a Royal Philharmonic Society Award in 2007. The same year, MacMillan was elected a Fellow of the Royal Society of Edinburgh (FRSE). In 2008, he received the British Composer Award for Liturgical Music for his Strathclyde Motets.

In 2008, he became honorary patron of London Chamber Orchestra's LCO New: Explore project, which explores links between music and other art forms and fosters emerging creative talent in composition. He also is the patron of the Strathearn Music Society. He was knighted by Queen Elizabeth II in the 2015 Birthday Honours for services to Music.

In 2019, The Guardian ranked MacMillan's Stabat Mater the 23rd greatest work of art music since 2000.

In 2024, he became a Fellow of The Ivors Academy, the 26th person to be so honoured.

In October 2025, he was nominated for two Ivor Novello Awards for his piece Concerto for Orchestra and Timotheus, Bacchus and Cecilia. King Charles III appointed him a Knight of the Order of the Thistle (KT) in June 2026. On 18 September 2026 King Charles III presented him the 2025 King's Medal for Music at Dumfries House, which had been awarded and announced 3 March 2026.

== Personal life ==
MacMillan married Lynne Frew in 1983; they have three children. He also had a grandchild who had Dandy–Walker syndrome.

Orders of precedence in the United Kingdom
Preceded by Sir Jim McDonald	Gentlemen	Succeeded by Ian Sinclair

== Key works ==
- After the Tryst (violin and piano – 1988)
- Cantos Sagrados (choir and organ – 1989)
- The Confession of Isobel Gowdie (orchestra – 1990)
- The Berserking (piano concerto – 1990)
- Veni, Veni, Emmanuel (percussion concerto – 1992)
- Seven Last Words from the Cross (cantata: choir and strings – 1993)
- Inés de Castro (opera, libretto: Jo Clifford – 1991–95)
- Britannia! (orchestra – 1994)
- Christus Vincit (1994), for SSAATTBB and soli
- Three Scottish Songs, voice and piano (text: William Soutar) (1995)
- Cello Concerto (1996)
- The World's Ransoming (cor anglais and orchestra – 1996)
- Symphony: Vigil (1997)
- Quickening (soloists, chorus and orchestra – 1998)
- Symphony No. 2 (1999)
- Mass (choir and organ – 2000)
- Cello Sonata No. 2, dedicated to Julian Lloyd Webber
- The Birds of Rhiannon (orchestra + optional chorus, text: Michael Symmons Roberts – 2001)
- O Bone Jesu (2001), for SSAATTBB + soli
- Symphony No. 3 "Silence" (2002)
- Piano Concerto No. 2 (2003)
- A Scotch Bestiary (organ and orchestra – 2004)
- In splendoribus sanctorum (2005) (Introit for the Fifth Sunday of Lent; for soprano, alto, tenor and bass chorus, obbligato trumpet and/or organ; from the Strathclyde Motets)
- Sun-Dogs (2006)
- The Sacrifice (opera, 2007)
- St John Passion (2008)
- Piano Concerto No. 3 "The Mysteries of Light" (2008)
- Miserere, mixed chorus a cappella (2009)
- Violin Concerto No. 1 (2009)
- Oboe Concerto (2010)
- Clemency (2011)
- Woman of the Apocalypse (2012)
- St Luke Passion (2013)
- Viola Concerto (2013)
- Percussion Concerto No. 2 (2014)
- Symphony No. 4 (2015)
- Stabat Mater (2015)
- A European Requiem (2015)
- Larghetto for orchestra (transcription of Miserere, 2017)
- Symphony No. 5 "Le grand Inconnu" (2018)
- Her tears fell with the dews at even (2020)
- A Christmas Oratorio (2021)
- Violin Concerto No. 2 (2021)
- "Who shall separate us?", anthem for the state funeral of Elizabeth II (2022)
- Composed in August, Robert Burns song (2023), World Premiere (2024)

== Bibliography ==
=== Articles ===
- MacMillan, James (11 October 2008). "In harmony with heaven". The Tablet. pp. 12–13.

=== Books ===
- MacMillan, James (2019). A Scots Song: A Life of Music. Edinburgh: Birlinn. ISBN 978-1-78027-617-5.

=== Critical studies and reviews ===
- Capps, Michael (Summer 2007). "Warld in a roar: the music of James MacMillan". Image: A Journal of the Arts and Religion. 54: 95–108.
- Spicer, Paul. "James MacMillan: Choral Music: a practical commentary and survey. Boosey & Hawkes (2001, updated 2021)
