= Musicians at the Edinburgh International Festival, 1957–1966 =

Musicians at the Edinburgh International Festival, 1957–1966 lists the major artists who appeared during the second decade of the Edinburgh International Festival.

Orchestras and groups from Scotland, Britain, Austria, France, Germany, Switzerland, Denmark, the Netherlands, Czechoslovakia, Poland, the Soviet Union, Canada and the USA were all invited to perform.

The Scottish Orchestra, now known as the Royal Scottish National Orchestra, and BBC Scottish Orchestra were present, joined by the London Symphony Orchestra, Royal Philharmonic Orchestra, Philharmonia Orchestra, Royal Opera House Orchestra, Covent Garden, Royal Liverpool Philharmonic Orchestra; Hallé Orchestra, Bournemouth Symphony Orchestra, BBC Concert Orchestra, English Chamber Orchestra and others.

European and American orchestras included the Berlin Philharmonic, Bavarian Radio Symphony Orchestra, Hamburg Radio Symphony Orchestra, Czech Philharmonic, Orchestra of the National Theatre, Prague, Concertgebouw Orchestra, Netherlands Chamber Orchestra, Vienna Symphony Orchestra, Orchestre National de la RTF, Royal Danish Orchestra, Polish Radio Symphony Orchestra, Lucerne Festival Strings, Leningrad Symphony Orchestra, Moscow Radio Orchestra, the Pittsburgh Symphony Orchestra and the National Youth Orchestra of Canada.

Each orchestra or group came with celebrated conductors and soloists, many of whom are still famous today as their recordings remain the standard by which contemporary musicians are judged.

== 1957 ==
Orchestras	Conductors	Soloists	Singers	Ensembles and choral groups
Hallé Orchestra, Bavarian Radio Symphony Orchestra, Philharmonia Orchestra, BBC Scottish Orchestra, Scottish National Orchestra, Concertgebouw Orchestra, Convivium Musicum (Chamber Orchestra of the Bavarian Radio Symphony Orchestra),	John Barbirolli, Otto Klemperer, Eugen Jochum, Eugene Ormandy, Ian Whyte, Hans Swarowsky, Eduard van Beinum	Janos Starker, Clara Haskil, Rudolf Firkušný, Gerald Moore, Szymon Goldberg, Thurston Dart, Gerard Hengeveld, Francis Poulenc, Nina Milkina, Weldon Kilburn, Hilde Dermota	Lois Marshall, Heinz Rehfuss, Anton Dermota, Dietrich Fischer-Dieskau, Victoria de los Ángeles, Pierre Bernac, Anna Russell	Hallé Choir, Dennis Brain Wind Ensemble, Saltire Singers, Deller Consort, Hollywood String Quartet, Parrenin String Quartet, Jacobean Ensemble, Robert Masters String Quartet, New Edinburgh Quartet

== 1958 ==
Orchestras	Conductors	Soloists	Singers	Ensembles and choral groups
Philharmonia Orchestra, Royal Danish Orchestra, Royal Opera House Orchestra, Covent Garden, Scottish National Orchestra, Vienna Symphony Orchestra	Otto Klemperer, Ernest Ansermet, Wolfgang Sawallisch, Georg Solti, Mogens Wöldike, Benjamin Britten, Enrique Jorda, Hans Swarowsky, Josef Krips, Antonio Janigro	Yehudi Menuhin, Hans Richter-Haaser, Louis Kentner, Claudio Arrau, Gaspar Cassadó, Kathleen Long, Julian Bream, Gerald Moore, Jelka Stanic Krek, Steffano Passaggio, Wight Henderson, Thomas Matthews, Eileen Ralf, John Newmark	Jennifer Vyvyan, Nicolai Gedda, Kim Borg, Norma Procter, Peter Pears, Victoria de los Ángeles, Maria Stader, Maureen Forrester,	Végh Quartet, Juilliard Quartet, Quartetto Chigiano, Zagreb Soloists' Ensemble, Edinburgh University Singers, Montreal Bach Choir, Pasquier Trio, Berlin Philharmonic Octet, New Edinburgh Quartet, Lyra String Quartet, Edinburgh Royal Choral Union, Royal Danish Chapel Choir

== 1959 ==
Orchestras	Conductors	Soloists	Singers	Ensembles and choral groups
Royal Philharmonic Orchestra, Scottish National Orchestra, London Mozart Players, Lucerne Festival Strings, Czech Philharmonic Orchestra,	William Walton, Rudolf Kempe, Alexander Gibson, Adrian Boult, Rudolf Baumgartner, Hans Schmidt-Isserstedt, Karel Ančerl, Raymond Leppard	Pierre Fournier, Hans Richter-Haaser, Wilhelm Kempff, Terence MacDonagh, Jack Brymer, Gwydion Brooke, Jean-Pierre Rampal, Nicanor Zabaleta, Erik Werba, Gerald Moore, Wolfgang Schneiderhan, Johanna Martzy, Rudolf Firkušný, Carl Seemann, Robert Veyron-Lecroix, Andrew Woodburn	Heather Harper, John Cameron, Irmgard Seefried, Dietrich Fischer-Dieskau, Richard Lewis, Josephine Veasey, Jennifer Vyvyan	Vronsky & Babin, Amadeus Quartet, Loewenguth Quartet, Stross Quartet, Prometheus Ensemble, Leppard Ensemble, Sextet Luca Marenzio, Edinburgh University Singers, Amici Quartet, Edinburgh Royal Choral Union

== 1960 ==
Orchestras	Conductors	Soloists	Singers	Ensembles and choral groups
Philharmonia Orchestra, Scottish National Orchestra, Royal Liverpool Philharmonic Orchestra, Leningrad Symphony Orchestra, Sacher Chamber Orchestra Zurich	Carlo Maria Giulini, Wolfgang Sawallisch, Alexander Gibson, Vittorio Gui, Paul Sacher, John Pritchard, Eugen Mravinsky, Gennadi Rozhdestvensky	Gioconda de Vito, Claudio Arrau, Myra Hess, Paul Badura-Skoda, Isaac Stern, Gerald Moore, Witold Małcużyński, Mstislav Rostropovich, Joan Dickson, Enrico Mainardi, George Malcolm, Ernst Wallfisch, Adam Harasiewicz, Halina Czerny-Stefańska, Lory Wallfisch, Hester Dickson, Alexander Dedukhin	Joan Sutherland, Fiorenza Cossotto, Luigi Ottolini, Ivo Vinco, Ursula Boese, Victoria de los Ángeles, Oralia Dominguez, Richard Lewis, Giuseppe Modesti, Helga Pilarczyk, Hermann Prey, Janet Baker	Juilliard Quartet, Amadeus Quartet, Beaux Arts Trio, Koeckert Quartet, Ars Musicae Ensemble

== 1961 ==
Orchestras	Conductors	Soloists	Singers	Ensembles and choral groups
London Symphony Orchestra, Scottish National Orchestra, Berlin Philharmonic Orchestra, BBC Scottish Orchestra, Philharmonia Orchestra, English Chamber Orchestra	Leopold Stokowski, Colin Davis, Alexander Gibson, Herbert von Karajan, Rudolf Kempe, Rafael Kubelík, Norman Del Mar, Otto Klemperer, Carlo Maria Giulini, John Pritchard, Meredith Davies, Raymond Leppard, John Carewe	Arturo Benedetti Michelangeli, Annie Fischer, Hugh Maguire, William Waterhouse, Wolfgang Marschner, Karlheinz Zöller, Maureen Jones, Henryk Szeryng, Clifford Curzon, David Wilde, Alan Civil, Szymon Goldberg, Bruno Giuranna, John Ogdon, Gerald Moore, Joan Dickson, George Malcolm, Benjamin Britten, Felix Lavilla, Brenton Langbein, Maureen Jones, Julian Bream, Maria Curcio, Roger Lord, Kenneth Heath	Gré Brouwenstijn, Nell Rankin, James McCracken, John Lanigan, Forbes Robinson, Murray Dickie, Elisabeth Söderström.Heather Harper, Janet Baker, Peter Pears, Joan Sutherland, Geraint Evans, Teresa Berganza, Joan Carlyle, Josephine Veasey, Michael Langdon, John Shirley-Quirk	Allegri String Quartet, Amadeus String Quartet, Gregg Smith Singers, New Music Ensemble, Edinburgh University Singers, Drolc String Quartet, Concertgebouw Wind Quintet, Trio di Trieste, Edinburgh Royal Choral Union

== 1962 ==
Orchestras	Conductors	Soloists	Singers	Ensembles and choral groups
London Symphony Orchestra, Polish Radio Symphony Orchestra, BBC Scottish Orchestra, Scottish National Orchestra, Philharmonia Orchestra,	Lorin Maazel, John Pritchard, Igor Markevitch, Jan Krenz, Charles Mackerras, Norman Del Mar, Alexander Gibson, Gennadi Rozhdestvensky, Carlo Maria Giulini, August Wenzinger, Dennis Stevens	Mstislav Rostropovich, Paul Badura-Skoda, Maureen Jones, Brenton Langbein, Joan Dickson, David Oistrakh, Sviatoslav Richter, Benjamin Britten, Felix Lavilla, Yvonne Lefebure, Geoffrey Parsons, Wolfgang Marschner, Barry Tuckwell, Margaret Kitchin, Jacqueline du Pré, Ernest Lush, John Ogdon, James Blades, Rosalyn Tureck, Stephen Whittaker, Brenda Lucas, Frida Bauer, Tadeusz Wronski	Galina Vishnevskaya, Marga Höffgen, Richard Lewis, Catherine Gayer, Teresa Berganza, Elisabeth Söderström, Thomas Hemsley, Stefania Woytowicz, Janet Baker, Alexander Young, Peter Pears, Frederick Guthrie, Raimundo Torres	Leeds Festival Chorus, Borodin String Quartet, Schola Cantorum Basiliensis, Allegri String Quartet, Melos Ensemble, English String Quartet, Gregg Smith Singers, Accademia Monteverdiana, Edinburgh Royal Choral Union

== 1963 ==
Orchestras	Conductors	Soloists	Singers	Ensembles and choral groups
Royal Opera House Orchestra, Covent Garden, BBC Scottish Orchestra, London Symphony Orchestra, Scottish National Orchestra, Bournemouth Symphony Orchestra, BBC Symphony Orchestra, Concertgebouw Orchestra	Georg Solti, John Pritchard, Norman Del Mar, Hans Werner Henze, Colin Davis, István Kertész, Constantin Silvestri, Bernard Haitink, George Szell,	Larry Adler, Geoffrey Parsons, Ali Akbar Khan, Bismillah Khan, Benjamin Britten, Gervase de Peyer, Heinz Holliger, Gerald Moore, George Malcolm, Hephzibah Menuhin, Yehudi Menuhin, John Ogdon, Jimmy Shand, Ravi Shankar, Isaac Stern, Leonard Rose, Eugene Istomin, Barry Tuckwell, David Wilde, Paul Doktor, Clifford Curzon, Andrew Bryson, Narayana Menon, Brenda Lucas	Josephine Veasey, Nicolai Gedda, William McAlpine, Alexander Young, Peter Glossop, Heather Harper, Kenneth McKeller, Peter Pears, Norma Procter, Marion Studholme, Subbulakshmi, Mihaly Szekely, David Ward, Olga Szönyi, Ella Lee	Amadeus String Quartet, Tatrai String Quartet, The Edinburgh Players, Hurwitz Chamber Ensemble, Philomusica of London, Edinburgh String Quartet, Julian Bream Consorts

== 1964 ==
Orchestras	Conductors	Soloists	Singers	Ensembles and choral groups
Orchestre National de la RTF, London Symphony Orchestra, Scottish National Orchestra, BBC Scottish Orchestra, Pittsburgh Symphony Orchestra, English Chamber Orchestra, Orchestra and Chorus of the National Theatre, Prague, Scottish National Chamber Orchestra	Charles Munch, Lorin Maazel, Gennadi Rozhdestvensky, Alexander Gibson, Norman Del Mar, William Steinberg, Alexander Schneider, Herrick Bunney, James Sloggie	Sviatoslav Richter, Mstislav Rostropovich, Wolfgang Schneiderhan, Rudolf Serkin, Rudolf Firkušný, Charles Treger, Manoug Parikian, Julian Bream, Erik Werba, Gerald Moore, Janet Craxton, David Wilde, Michael Roll, Joan Dickson, Robert Keys, Denis Woolford, Andrew Bryson, Hester Dickson, Ronald Gonella, Julian Dawson, Jan Hus Tichy, Jiří Pokorny	William McAlpine, Marilyn Horne, Janet Baker, Camille Maurane, Joseph Rouleau, Irmgard Seefried, April Cantelo, Alexander Young, Thomas Hemsley, Charles Craig, Dietrich Fischer-Dieskau, Heather Harper, Kenneth McKeller, Neil Howlett, Libuše Domanínská, Marta Krásová, Beno Blachut, Eduard Haken, Maria Tauberova, Ivo Žídek, Přemysl Kočí, William McCue, Elizabeth Robson, Duncan Robertson, Ivana Mixová, Jindřich Jindrák	Janáček String Quartet, Allegri String Quartet, Oromonte String Trio, Bream Consort, The Edinburgh University Singers, Scottish Piano Trio, Wind Band of the National Theatre, Prague,

== 1965 ==
Orchestras	Conductors	Soloists	Singers	Ensembles and choral groups
Scottish National Orchestra, Hamburg Radio Symphony Orchestra, New Philharmonia Orchestra, BBC Scottish Orchestra, BBC Concert Orchestra, Netherlands Chamber Orchestra, London Mozart Players, New Philharmonia Chamber Orchestra	Alexander Gibson, Hans Schmidt-Isserstedt, Pierre Boulez, Carlo Maria Giulini, John Barbirolli, Norman Del Mar, Vilem Tausky, James Loughran, Szymon Goldberg, Harry Blech, Alberto Erede, Felix de Nobel	Henryk Szeryng, John Ogdon, Yvonne Loriod, Claudio Arrau, Wanda Wilkomirska, Johnny Dankworth, David Mason, Severino Gazzelloni, Gareth Morris, Heinz Holliger, Ernest Lush, Joan Dickson, Margaret Kitchin, Bismillah Khan, Palghat Mani Iyer, Vilayat Khan, Imrat Khan, K V Narayanaswamy, Lalgudi G Jayaraman, Shanta Prasad, Marinus Flipse, Thomas Magyar, George Swift	Heather Harper, Gwyneth Jones, Janet Baker, Norma Procter, Vilém Přibyl, Donald McIntyre, Ruth-Margret Pütz, Halina Lukomska, Mattiwilda Dobbs, Inia Te Wiata, Erna Spoorenberg, Helen Watts, Gerald English, Forbes Robinson, Hans Hotter, Robert Tear, Gwenyth Annear, Vladimir Ruzdjak,	Parrenin String Quartet, Hungarian String Quartet, Netherlands Chamber Choir, Hamburg String Trio, New Philharmonia Ensemble, New Music Ensemble, Johnny Dankworth and His Orchestra

== 1966 ==
Orchestras	Conductors	Soloists	Singers	Ensembles and choral groups
Scottish National Orchestra, Moscow Radio Orchestra, New Philharmonia Orchestra, National Youth Orchestra of Canada, BBC Scottish Orchestra, Hallé Orchestra, Scottish National Chamber Orchestra, Virtuosi di Roma	Alexander Gibson, Gennadi Rozhdestvensky, Rafael Kubelík, Claudio Abbado, Walter Susskind, James Loughran, John Barbirolli, Renato Fasano, Herrick Bunney	Natalia Shakhovskaya, Nikolai Petrov, Annie Fischer, Pierre Fournier, Daniel Barenboim, Martha Argerich, Henryk Szeryng, Emil Gilels, Jörg Demus, Hubert Giesen, Irwin Gage, Maureen Jones, Brenton Langbein, Paul Hamburger, Jean Fonda, Nina Milkina, Mikhail Waiman	Elizabeth Vaughan, Janet Baker, Richard Lewis, Forbes Robinson, Heather Harper, Gwyneth Jones, Yvonne Minton, Norma Procter, Vilém Přibyl, Donald McIntyre, Elsie Morison, Evelyn Lear, Irmgard Seefried, Elisabeth Schwarzkopf, Fritz Wunderlich, Gwenyth Annear, Vladimir Ruzdjak,	Delme String Quartet, Danzi Quintet, Amadeus Quartet, Oromonte Piano Trio, Edinburgh University Singers

== See also ==
- Edinburgh International Festival
- World premieres at the Edinburgh International Festival
- Musicians at the Edinburgh International Festival, 1947–1956
- Musicians at the Edinburgh International Festival, 1967–1976
- Opera at the Edinburgh International Festival: history and repertoire, 1947–1956
- Opera at the Edinburgh International Festival: history and repertoire, 1957–1966
- Opera at the Edinburgh International Festival: history and repertoire, 1967–1976
- Ballet at the Edinburgh International Festival: history and repertoire, 1947–1956
- Ballet at the Edinburgh International Festival: history and repertoire, 1957–1966
- Ballet at the Edinburgh International Festival: history and repertoire, 1967–1976
- Drama at the Edinburgh International Festival: history and repertoire, 1947–1956
- Drama at the Edinburgh International Festival: history and repertoire, 1957–1966
- Drama at the Edinburgh International Festival: history and repertoire, 1967–1976
- Visual Arts at the Edinburgh International Festival, 1947–1976
