= Musicians at the Edinburgh International Festival, 1947–1956 =

Musicians at the Edinburgh International Festival, 1947 to 1957 lists the major artists who have appeared at the Edinburgh International Festival.

Orchestras and groups from Scotland, Britain, Europe and America were all invited to perform.

From the beginning the Scottish Orchestra, now known as the Royal Scottish National Orchestra, and BBC Scottish Orchestra were present, joined by the Royal Philharmonic Orchestra, Philharmonia Orchestra, London Philharmonic Orchestra, and Hallé Orchestra,

Major European orchestras included the Vienna Philharmonic, the Vienna Hofmusikkapelle, the Berlin Philharmonic, the Orchestre de la Suisse Romande, Orchestra of La Scala, Milan, Concertgebouw Orchestra, and the Orchestre national de la Radiodiffusion française, now called the Orchestre National de France.

From America came the Philharmonic Symphony Orchestra of New York, now known as the New York Philharmonic, and the Boston Symphony Orchestra.

Each orchestra or group was accompanied by conductors and soloists, many of whom remain known today, and their recordings are referenced by contemporary musicians.

== 1947 ==
Orchestras	Conductors	Soloists	Singers	Ensembles and choral groups
L'orchestre des Concerts Colonne, Hallé Orchestra, Liverpool Philharmonic Orchestra, The Scottish Orchestra, Vienna Philharmonic Orchestra, BBC Scottish Orchestra, Jacques Orchestra	Paul Paray, John Barbirolli, Malcolm Sargent, Bruno Walter, Hugh Roberton, Walter Susskind, Ian Whyte, Reginald Jacques	Artur Schnabel, Joseph Szigeti, William Primrose, Pierre Fournier, Gerald Moore, Léon Goossens, William Allen, Marie Korchinska, Ruth Pearl, Mary Carter, Harvey Phillips, John Francis	Lotte Lehmann, Todd Duncan, Roy Henderson, Kathleen Ferrier, Peter Pears, Ena Mitchell, Robert Irwin, Eric Greene, Margaret Field Hyde, William Parsons	Glasgow Orpheus Choir, The Czech Nonet, Menges String Quartet, Calvet String Quartet, Robert Masters Quartet, Carter String Quartet

== 1948 ==
Orchestras	Conductors	Soloists	Singers	Ensembles and choral groups
Concertgebouw Orchestra, Liverpool Philharmonic Orchestra, BBC Scottish Orchestra, BBC Symphony Orchestra, Augusteo Orchestra, Boyd Neel Orchestra	Eduard van Beinum, Charles Munch, Malcolm Sargent, John Barbirolli, Adrian Boult, Bernardino Molinari, Wilhelm Furtwängler, Vittorio Gui, Hugh S. Roberton, Boyd Neel, Joyce Fleming	Artur Schnabel, Yehudi Menuhin, Gregor Piatigorsky, Arturo Benedetti Michelangeli, Gioconda de Vito, Enrico Mainardi, Louis Kentner, Alfred Cortot, Kathleen Long, Léon Goossens, Archie Camden, Dennis Brain, Gerald Moore, Segovia, James Whitehead, Max Gilbert, Maurice Clare, Kendal Taylor, Elizabeth Lockhart, Thornton Lofthouse	Isobel Baillie, Harold Williams, Kathleen Ferrier, Owen Brannigan, Maggie Teyte, Joan Alexander, Roy Henderson, John Tainsh, Alec Carmichael, Janette Sclanders, Evelyn Campbell, Eric Greene	Huddersfield Choral Society, Glasgow Orpheus Choir, Hungarian String Quartet, The Scottish Singers, Trio di Trieste, Robert Masters Quartet, Carter String Trio

== 1949 ==
Orchestras	Conductors	Soloists	Singers	Ensembles and choral groups
Royal Philharmonic Orchestra, Berlin Philharmonic Orchestra, Orchestre de la Suisse Romande, Philharmonia Orchestra, Orchestre du Conservatoire, Jacques Orchestra	Thomas Beecham, John Barbirolli, Eugène Goossens, Ian Whyte, Ernest Bloch, Ernest Ansermet, Rafael Kubelik, Bruno Walter, André Cluytens, Reginald Jacques, Charles Guild	Léon Goossens, Guilhermina Suggia, Jacqueline Blancard, Rudolf Serkin, Adolf Busch, Ginette Neveu, Monique de la Bruchollerie, Frederick Thurston, Dennis Brain, James Merrett, Ivor Newton, Gerald Moore, Alan Richardson, Gareth Morris, Frederick Thurston, Geoffrey Gilbert, Henri Honegger, Jean Neveu, Corinne Lacomblé, Paul Draper, Waldo Channon, Ailie Cullen, Marie Korchinska, Irene Richards, Thornton Lofthouse, Margot Stebbing, John Walton, Kinloch Anderson, Harold Clarke	Kathleen Ferrier, Aulikki Rautawaara, Aksel Schiotz, Richard Lewis, Joan Alexander, John Tainsh	Busch Quartet, Glasgow Orpheus Choir, Griller String Quartet, The Prague Trio, The Cloister Singers of St Andrews, Pro Musica Antiqua Ensemble of Brussels

== 1950 ==
Orchestras	Conductors	Soloists	Singers	Ensembles and choral groups
Orchestre national de la Radiodiffusion française, Royal Philharmonic Orchestra, BBC Scottish Orchestra, Hallé Orchestra, Orchestra of La Scala, Milan Statsradiofonien Orchestra, Denmark	Roger Désormière, Leonard Bernstein, Thomas Beecham, Hugh Roberton, Fritz Busch, Erik Tuxen, Ian Whyte, John Barbirolli, Victor de Sabata, Guido Cantelli, Franco Capuana, Ian Pitt-Watson	Marguerite Long, Marcel Dupré, Pierre Fournier, Robert Casadesus, Claudio Arrau, Anthony Pini, Betty Humby Beecham, Nathan Milstein, Clifford Curzon, William Primrose, Artur Balsam, Manoug Parikian, Millicent Silver, Emil Telmányi, Joan Dickson, Hester Dickson, Max Rostal, Dennis Brain, Pierre Fournier, Ernest Lush, Gerald Moore, Frederick Thurston, Jean Françaix, Benjamin Britten, Hans Geiger, George Roth, John Francis, Bernard Davis, Mona Benson, Betty Brown, Franz Osborn, George Reeves	Isobel Baillie, Richard Lewis, Kathleen Ferrier, Renata Tebaldi, Fedora Barbieri, Giacinto Prandelli, Cesare Siepi, Victoria de los Ángeles, Boris Christoff, Elisabeth Schwarzkopf, Peter Pears, Alfred Deller, Jennie Tourel, Flora Nielsen, Trevor Anthony, Ena Mitchell, William Parsons, George James, John Tainsh	Glasgow Orpheus Choir, Chorus of La Scala, Loewenguth String Quartet, Griller String Quartet, Budapest String Quartet Edinburgh Royal Choral Union, London Harpsichord Ensemble, Quintette a vent de l'Orchestre National

== 1951 ==
Orchestras	Conductors	Soloists	Singers	Ensembles and choral groups
London Philharmonic Orchestra, Philharmonic Symphony Orchestra of New York, National Youth Orchestra of Great Britain, Scottish National Orchestra, BBC Scottish Orchestra, The Hallé Orchestra, Boyd Neel Orchestra, London Mozart Players	Adrian Boult, Bruno Walter, Dimitri Mitropoulos, Walter Susskind, Ian Whyte, Boyd Neel, Ferdinand Grossmann, Ian Pitt-Watson, Felix de Nobel	Ida Haendel. Léon Goossens, Myra Hess, Zino Francescatti, Robert Casadesus, Solomon, Leonard Rose, Gioconda de Vito, Jack Brymer, Dennis Brain, Ethel Bartlett and Rae Robertson, Norbert Brainin, Peter Schidlof, Francis Poulenc, Colin Bradbury, Maurice Clare, Nina Milkina, Elfriede Hofstätter, Franz Bauer	Irmgard Seefried, Frances Yeend, David Lloyd, Martha Lipton, Mack Harrell, Victoria de los Ángeles, Kathleen Ferrier, Richard Lewis, Suzanne Danco, Fanély Revoil, Willy Clément, Pierre Bernac	Griller String Quartet, New Italian Quartet, Amadeus String Quartet, Nederlands Kamerkoor, Wiener Akademie-Kammerchor, Edinburgh Royal Choral Union, Scottish Concerts, Edinburgh University Singers

== 1952 ==
Orchestras	Conductors	Soloists	Singers	Ensembles and choral groups
Royal Philharmonic Orchestra, Concertgebouw Orchestra, Scottish National Orchestra, National Youth Orchestra of Great Britain, BBC Scottish Orchestra, Stuttgart Chamber Orchestra, Royal Philharmonic Chamber Orchestra,	Thomas Beecham, John Pritchard, Vittorio Gui, Rafael Kubelík, Eduard van Beinum, Walter Susskind, Ian Whyte, Hans Oppenheim, Karl Münchinger, Agnes Duncan	Clifford Curzon, Josef Szigeti, William Primrose, Pierre Fournier, Max Rostal, Hans Gal, Jack Brymer, Gwydion Brooke, Dennis Brain, Diana Poulton, Annie Woud, Adele Karp, Sybil Tait	Arda Mandikian, Léopold Simoneau, Bruce Boyce, Kathleen Ferrier, Julius Patzak, Irmgard Seefried, Frederick Dalberg, Dietrich Fischer-Dieskau, Richard Lewis, Alfred Deller, April Cantelo, Joan Alexander, Sophie Wyss, Marian Nowakowski, William Herbert, André Vessières, Ena Mitchell, William Parsons, Bruce Clark, Mary Grierson	Amadeus String Quartet, Vegh String Quartet, Edinburgh Royal Choral Union, Quintette de l'atelier, Robert Masters Piano Quartet, Scottish Junior Singers, London Czech Trio

== 1953 ==
Orchestras	Conductors	Soloists	Singers	Ensembles and choral groups
Rome Symphony Orchestra of the Italian Radio (RAI), BBC Symphony Orchestra, Philharmonia Orchestra, National Youth Orchestra of Great Britain, Scottish National Orchestra, Vienna Philharmonic Orchestra, London Mozart Players	Fernando Previtali, Vittorio Gui, Malcolm Sargent, Herbert von Karajan, Adrian Boult, Karl Rankl, Wilhelm Furtwängler, Bruno Walter, Harry Blech, Renato Fasano, Boris Ord	Gioconda de Vito, Isaac Stern, Solomon, Yehudi Menuhin, William Primrose, Gwydion Brooke, Noel Mewton-Wood, Léon Goossens Carol Sansom, Nina Milkina	Eleanor Steber, David Lloyd, Jerome Hines, Joan Alexander, Irmgard Seefried, Dietrich Fischer-Dieskau, Bruce Boyce, Vladimir Ruzdjak	Paganini String Quartet, Barylli String Quartet, Loewenguth String Quartet, Saltire Singers, Edinburgh Royal Choral Union, Vienna Octet, Italian Opera Quartet, Cambridge University Madrigal Singers, Carter String Trio, Alban Trio, Virtuosi di Roma

== 1954 ==
Orchestras	Conductors	Soloists	Singers	Ensembles and choral groups
Orchestre national de la Radiodiffusion française, Symphony Orchestra of the Nordwestdeutscher Rundfunk, National Youth Orchestra of Great Britain, Scottish National Orchestra, Hallé Orchestra, Philharmonia Orchestra, Statsradiofoniens Symfoniorkester, Denmark, Chamber Orchestra of the Statsradiofonien, Denmark, Jacques Orchestra	Erik Tuxen, Thomas Jensen, Ian Whyte, Paul Kletzki, Charles Münch, Hans Schmidt-Isserstedt, Jean Martinon, Karl Rankl, John Barbirolli, Herbert von Karajan, Guido Cantelli, Reginald Jacques, Mogens Wöldike, Paul Sacher	Isaac Stern, Alexander Zakin, Wolfgang Schneiderhan, Claudio Arrau, Dennis Brain, Nicole Henriot, Artur Rubinstein, Claudio Arrau, Geoffrey Gilbert, Léon Goossens, Emanuel Hurwitz, Cecil Aronowitz, William Pleeth, Gerald Moore, André Jaunet, Artur Tröster, Allan Schiller, James Ching, Ib Eriksson, Ursula Burkhard, Hans Andreae	Sylvia Fisher, Constance Shacklock, Murray Dickie, Owen Brannigan, Elisabeth Schwarzkopf, Richard Lewis, Hans Hotter, Mattiwilda Dobbs, Irmgard Seefried, William Herbert	Sheffield Philharmonic Chorus, Amadeus String Quartet, Pascal String Quartet, Edinburgh Royal Choral Union, West Calder and District Male Choir, Golden Age Singers, Soirée Offenbach, Kehr String Trio, Collegium Musicum, Zurich

== 1955 ==
Orchestras	Conductors	Soloists	Singers	Ensembles and choral groups
Berlin Philharmonic Orchestra, BBC Symphony Orchestra, Netherlands Chamber Orchestra, National Youth Orchestra of Wales, Scottish National Orchestra, Philharmonic Symphony Orchestra of New York	Eugene Ormandy, Wolfgang Sawallisch, Paul Hindemith, Joseph Keilberth, Malcolm Sargent. Szymon Goldberg, Clarence Raybould, Karl Rankl, Dimitri Mitropoulos, George Szell, Hans Oppenheim, Karl Haas	Solomon, Reginald Kell, Zino Francescatti, Enrico Mainardi, Géza Anda, Pierre Fournier, Segovia, Rosalyn Tureck, Myra Hess, Clifford Curzon, Geoffrey Gilbert, Reginald Kell, Ralph Kirkpatrick, Dalton Baldwin, George Reeves	Dietrich Fischer-Dieskau, Gérard Souzay, Jennie Tourel, Denis Quilley, Joan Davies, Annie Balfour, Emerentia Scheepers	I Musici, Hungarian String Quartet, Griller String Quartet, Saltire Music Group, Edinburgh Royal Choral Union, Wigmore Ensemble, New Edinburgh Quartet, London Baroque Ensemble

== 1956 ==
Orchestras	Conductors	Soloists	Singers	Ensembles and choral groups
Royal Philharmonic Orchestra, Boston Symphony Orchestra, Vienna Hofmusikkapelle, Scottish National Orchestra, BBC Scottish Orchestra, London Mozart Players, National Youth Orchestra of Great Britain	Thomas Beecham, Arthur Bliss, Charles Munch, Pierre Monteux, Josef Krips, Karl Rankl, Ian Whyte, Harry Blech, Walter Susskind, Peter Stadlen	Campoli, Frederick Riddle, John Kennedy, Robert Casadesus, Isaac Stern, Clifford Curzon, Carl Seemann, Myra Hess, Ernst von Dohnányi, Wolfgang Schneiderhan, Léon Goossens, Norbert Brainin, Peter Schidlof, Alexander Zakin, Erik Werba, Rosalyn Tureck, Louis Kentner, Gerald Moore, Ernest Lush, Nina Milkina	Sylvia Fisher, Nan Merriman, Richard Lewis, Kim Borg, Irmgard Seefried, Gerhard Hüsch, Joan Alexander, Oscar Czerwenka	Amadeus String Quartet, Végh String Quartet, Melos Ensemble, Edinburgh Royal Choral Union Renaissance Singers, Edinburgh University Singers, Boston Brass Ensemble, New Edinburgh Quartet

== See also ==
- Edinburgh International Festival
- World premieres at the Edinburgh International Festival
- Musicians at the Edinburgh International Festival, 1957–1966
- Musicians at the Edinburgh International Festival, 1967–1976
- Opera at the Edinburgh International Festival: history and repertoire, 1947–1956
- Opera at the Edinburgh International Festival: history and repertoire, 1957–1966
- Opera at the Edinburgh International Festival: history and repertoire, 1967–1976
- Ballet at the Edinburgh International Festival: history and repertoire, 1947–1956
- Ballet at the Edinburgh International Festival: history and repertoire, 1957–1966
- Ballet at the Edinburgh International Festival: history and repertoire, 1967–1976
- Drama at the Edinburgh International Festival: history and repertoire, 1947–1956
- Drama at the Edinburgh International Festival: history and repertoire, 1957–1966
- Drama at the Edinburgh International Festival: history and repertoire, 1967–1976
- Visual Arts at the Edinburgh International Festival, 1947–1976
