= Drama at the Edinburgh International Festival: history and repertoire, 1967–1976 =

Drama was an increasingly important part of the Edinburgh International Festival during its third decade. There were a total of 85 productions that were put on stage.

There were a total of 42 theatrical companies that appeared during the decade, of which the most prolific were the Prospect Theatre Company formerly Prospect Productions, Royal Lyceum Theatre Company based in Edinburgh's Royal Lyceum Theatre, and the Actors Company, founded by Edward Petherbridge and others in 1972. Other important companies included Glasgow Citizens Theatre, Nottingham Playhouse Company, The National Theatre of Great Britain and La MaMa Company of New York.

Visiting companies came from the US, Ireland, Japan, Italy, Sweden, Switzerland, Belgium, Czechoslovakia, Romania, Poland and Bulgaria.

Many performances were at the same venues used in earlier years, notably the Royal Lyceum Theatre, The Assembly Hall, and the former Gateway Theatre, but new venues came into use such as Church Hill Theatre, Haymarket Ice Rink and the Moray House College.

== List ==
Date	Company	Drama	Venue	Director	Principal actors	Notes and sources
1967	Haizlip-Stoiber Productions New York	The Emperor Jones (Eugene O'Neill)	Royal Lyceum Theatre	Gene Frankel	James Earl Jones	
1967	Prospect Productions	The Cherry Orchard (Anton Chekhov)	Royal Lyceum Theatre	Richard Cottrell	Lila Kedrova, Stephanie Bidmead, James Cairncross, Patrick Wymark, Terry Scully	
1967	Prospect Productions	A Room with a View (Lance Sieveking and Richard Cottrell after the novel by E. M. Forster)	Royal Lyceum Theatre	Toby Robertson	Fiona Walker, Lawrence Carter, Timothy West, Jean Anderson	
1967	Pop Theatre	A Midsummer Night's Dream (William Shakespeare)	The Assembly Hall	Frank Dunlop	Robin Bailey, Cleo Laine, Hywel Bennett, Edward Jewesbury, Denise Coffey, Peter Gilmore, Bernard Bresslaw	
1967	Pop Theatre	The Tricks of Scapin (Molière)	The Assembly Hall	Frank Dunlop	Peter Gilmore, Bernard Bresslaw, Edward Jewesbury, Jim Dale	
1967	Close Theatre Club in association with Citizens Theatre Glasgow	Lunchtime Concert, The Inhabitants and Coda (Olwen Wymark)	Gateway Theatre	Michael Meacham	Zoe Hicks, Arthur Cox, Bernard Hopkins	
1967	Marionetteatern, Stockholm	The Wizard of Oz (adapted by Michael Meschke, from the story by L. Frank Baum)	Gateway Theatre	Michael Meschke		
1967	Marionetteatern, Stockholm	Ubu Roi (Alfred Jarry)	Gateway Theatre	Michael Meschke		
1967	Hampstead Theatre Club	Nathan and Tabileth and Oldenberg (Barry Bermange)	Church Hill Theatre	James Roose-Evans		
1967	Traverse Theatre Club	Tom Paine (Paul Foster)	Church Hill Theatre	Tom O'Horgan		
1967	Voyage Theatre	Macbeth in Camera (Harold Lang)	Church Hill Theatre	Harold Lang	Harold Lang	
1967	Voyage Theatre	Man Speaking (Harold Lang)	Church Hill Theatre	Harold Lang	Harold Lang	
1968	69 Theatre Company	Hamlet (William Shakespeare)	The Assembly Hall	Caspar Wrede	Glyn Owen, Dilys Hamlet, Tom Courtenay, Anna Calder-Marshall	
1968	69 Theatre Company	When We Dead Awaken (Henrik Ibsen)	The Assembly Hall	Michael Elliott	Alexander Knox, Irene Hamilton, Brian Cox, Wendy Hiller	
1968	Prospect Productions	The Beggar's Opera (John Gay)	Royal Lyceum Theatre	Toby Robertson	Peter Gilmore, James Cossins, Jan Waters, Frances Cuka	
1968	Glasgow Citizens' Theatre	The Resistible Rise of Arturo Ui (Bertolt Brecht)	Royal Lyceum Theatre	Michael Blakemore	Leonard Rossiter, Steven Berkoff, Harold Innocent, Del Henney	
1968	Abbey Theatre Dublin	The Playboy of the Western World (J M Synge)	Royal Lyceum Theatre	Thomas MacAnna	Vincent Dowling, Aideen O'Kelly	
1968	Trinity Square Repertory Company	Years of the Locust (Norman Holland)	Church Hill Theatre	Adrian Hall	Richard Kneeland	
1968	Traverse Theatre Club	Mourning Becomes Electra (Eugene O'Neill)	Traverse Theatre	Gordon McDougall	Judy Campbell, John Fraser, Valerie Saruff	
1968	Laboratory Theatre '13 Rows' Wroclaw	Acropolis (adapted by Jerzy Grotowski from the play by Stanisław Wyspiański))	11 Cambridge Street (former festival office)	Jerzy Grotowski		
1969	Prospect Theatre Company	Edward II (Christopher Marlowe)	The Assembly Hall	Toby Robertson	Ian McKellen, Timothy West, Diane Fletcher, James Laurenson	
1969	Prospect Theatre Company	King Richard the Second (William Shakespeare)	The Assembly Hall	Richard Cottrell	Ian McKellen, Timothy West, Paul Hardwick, Robert Eddison, Stephen Greif	
1969	Scottish Actors' Company	The Wild Duck (Henrik Ibsen)	Royal Lyceum Theatre	Fulton MacKay	Robin Bailey, Brian Cox, Leonard Maguire, Una McLean, Anna Calder-Marshall	
1969	Bridge Productions Limited	ZOO ZOO Widdershins ZOO (Kevin Laffan)	Royal Lyceum Theatre	Frank Dunlop	Lynn Redgrave	
1969	The Nottingham Playhouse Company	The Hero Rises Up (John Arden and Margaretta D'Arcy)	Royal Lyceum Theatre	Bill Hays		
1969	The Nottingham Playhouse Company	Widowers' Houses (George Bernard Shaw)	Royal Lyceum Theatre	Michael Blakemore	Robin Ellis, Nicola Pagett	
1969	Theatre on the Balustrade Prague	The Button and The Fools (Ladislav Fialka)	Church Hill Theatre	Ladislav Fialka		
1969	Stables Theatre Company	Would you look at them smashing all the windows (David Wright)	Church Hill Theatre	Barry Davis	John Fraser, André van Gyseghem	
1969	The Central Puppet Theatre Sofia	Prince Marko (Ivan Theofilov)	Church Hill Theatre	Ivan Theofilov, Ivan Tsonev		
1969	The Central Puppet Theatre Sofia	Pinocchio	Church Hill Theatre	Liliana Docheva		
1969	The Central Puppet Theatre Sofia	The Misanthrope (after Molière)	Church Hill Theatre	Liuben Grois		
1970	Prospect Theatre Company	Much Ado About Nothing (William Shakespeare)	The Assembly Hall	Toby Robertson	Timothy West, Julian Glover, John Castle, John Neville, Barbara Ewing, Sylvia Syms	
1970	Prospect Theatre Company	Boswell's Life of Johnson (Bill Dutton, Toby Robertson and Ian Thorne)	The Assembly Hall	Toby Robertson	Timothy West, Julian Glover, John Neville, Barbara Ewing, Sylvia Syms	
1970	Deutsches Theater und Kammerspiele (Staatstheater der Deutschen Demokratischen Republik)	Peace Die Frieden (Aristophanes)	Royal Lyceum Theatre	Benno Besson	Klaus Piontek, Fred Düren, Elsa Grube-Deister	
1970	Royal Lyceum Theatre Company	Random Happenings in the Hebrides (John McGrath)	Royal Lyceum Theatre	Richard Eyre	John Thaw, John Cairney	
1970	Royal Lyceum Theatre Company	The Changeling (Thomas Middleton and William Rowley)	Royal Lyceum Theatre	Richard Eyre	Anna Calder-Marshall, David Burke, Arthur Cox, Bryan Stanyon	
1970	Teatro Libero Rome	Orlando Furioso (adapted from Ariosto by Edoardo Sanguineti)	Haymarket Ice Rink	Luca Ronconi		
1970	Leeds Playhouse Company	Henry IV (Luigi Pirandello translated by John Wardle)	Church Hill Theatre	Bill Hays		
1970	Royal Shakespeare Company	Pleasure and Repentance (Terry Hands)	Royal Lyceum Theatre	Terry Hands	Janet Suzman, Martin Best, Barrie Ingham, Brewster Mason, Richard Pasco	
1971	Prospect Theatre Company	King Lear (William Shakespeare)	The Assembly Hall	Toby Robertson	Timothy West, Fiona Walker	
1971	National Theatre of Great Britain	The Comedy of Errors (William Shakespeare)	Haymarket Ice Rink	Frank Dunlop	Edward Jewesbury, Sam Kelly, Andrew Robertson, Gavin Reed, Joan Heal	
1971	Royal Lyceum Theatre Company	Confessions of a Justified Sinner (James Hogg adapted by Jack Ronder)	Royal Lyceum Theatre	Richard Eyre	Russell Hunter	
1971	Bulandra Theatre Company, Bucharest, Romania	Carnival Scenes (I L Caragiale)	Royal Lyceum Theatre	Lucian Pintilie		
1971	Bulandra Theatre Company, Bucharest, Romania	Leonce and Lena (Georg Büchner)	Royal Lyceum Theatre	Liviu Ciulei	Ion Caramitru, Irina Petrescu	
1971	Long Wharf Theatre Company	You can't take it with you (Moss Hart and George S. Kaufman)	Royal Lyceum Theatre	Arvin Brown	Martha Schlamme, Joyce Ebert	
1971	Long Wharf Theatre Company	Solitaire and Double Solitaire (Robert Anderson)	Royal Lyceum Theatre	Arvin Brown	Martha Schlamme, Joyce Ebert, Richard Venture, William Swetland	
1971	The Manhattan Project	Alice in Wonderland based on (Lewis Carroll)	11 Cambridge Street	André Gregory		
1972	The National Theatre of Great Britain present the Young Vic Productions	The Comedy of Errors (William Shakespeare)	Haymarket Ice Rink	Frank Dunlop	Andrew Robertson, Gary Bond, Denise Coffey, Joan Heal	
1972	The National Theatre of Great Britain present the Young Vic Productions	Bible One (Tim Rice with music by Andrew Lloyd Webber)	Haymarket Ice Rink	Frank Dunlop	Andrew Robertson, Gary Bond, Denise Coffey, Joan Heal	
1972	Citizens' Theatre Glasgow	Tamburlaine the Great (Christopher Marlowe)	The Assembly Hall	Keith Hack	Jeffery Kissoon, Mike Gwilym, Murray Salem, Paola Dionisotti	
1972	Citizens' Theatre Glasgow	Twelfth Night (William Shakespeare)	The Assembly Hall	Giles Havergal	Mike Gwilym, Ian McDiarmid, James Aubrey, Jonathan Kent	
1972	Hosho Noh Theatre	Sumidagawa, Kakiyamabushi, Hagoromo	Royal Lyceum Theatre			
1972	Hosho Noh Theatre	Kiyotsune, Boshibari, Ayanotsuzumi	Royal Lyceum Theatre			
1972	Cambridge Theatre Company with The Actors Company	Ruling the Roost (Georges Feydeau translated by Richard Cottrell)	Royal Lyceum Theatre	Richard Cottrell	Moira Redmond, Tenniel Evans, Ronnie Stevens, Robin Ellis, Caroline Blakiston	
1972	Cambridge Theatre Company with The Actors Company	'Tis Pity She's a Whore (John Ford)	Royal Lyceum Theatre	David Giles	Ian McKellen, Felicity Kendall, Ronnie Stevens, Edward Petherbridge	
1972	Gruppo Sperimentazione Teatrale, Rome	Moby Dick (Mario Ricci after Herman Melville)	Church Hill Theatre	Mario Ricci		
1972	Théâtre Laboratoire Vicinal, Brussels	Tramp (Arthur Spilliaert)	The Gateway	Frédéric Flamand		
1972	Théâtre Laboratoire Vicinal, Brussels	Luna Park	The Gateway	Frédéric Flamand		
1973	The Royal Lyceum Theatre Company of Edinburgh	The Thrie Estaites (Sir David Lindsay)	The Assembly Hall	Bill Bryden	Roddy McMillan, Tom Fleming	
1973	The Royal Lyceum Theatre Company	The Knife (Ian Brown)	Lyceum Studio	John David		
1973	The Young Lyceum Company	Woyzeck (Georg Büchner)	The Assembly Hall	Radu Penciulescu		
1973	Prospect Theatre Company	Pericles (William Shakespeare)	Royal Lyceum Theatre	Toby Robertson	Derek Jacobi, Marilyn Taylorson, Ronnie Stevens	
1973	The Actors Company	Flow (Gabriel Josipovici) and Knots (from the book by R. D. Laing)	Lyceum Studio	Edward Petherbridge		
1973	The Actors Company	The Wood Demon (Anton Chekhov translated by Ronald Hingley)	Royal Lyceum Theatre	David Giles	Robert Eddison, Tenniel Evans, Ian McKellen	
1973	The Actors Company	The Way of the World (William Congreve)	Royal Lyceum Theatre	David William	Edward Petherbridge, Tenniel Evans, Ian McKellen, Robert Eddison, Caroline Blakiston	
1973	Prospect Theatre Company	Don Juan in Love (devised by Kenny McBain)	Royal Lyceum Theatre	Kenny McBain		
1974	The Actors Company	The Bacchae (Euripides)	The Assembly Hall	Edward Petherbridge	Mark McManus, Edward Petherbridge, Robert Eddison, Robin Ellis	
1974	The Actors Company	Tartuffe (Molière)	The Assembly Hall	Peter James	Windsor Davies, Edward Petherbridge, Charles Kay, Robert Eddison, Sheila Reid	
1974	Gothenburg City Theatre	Gustav III (August Strindberg)	Royal Lyceum Theatre	Lennart Hjulström	Sven Wollter, Sten Ljunggren	
1974	Abbey Theatre Dublin	King Oedipus (Sophocles)	Royal Lyceum Theatre	Michael Cacoyannis	Desmond Cave, Eamon Kelly, Gabrielle Reidy	
1974	The Mummenschanz Company		Church Hill Theatre		Andres Bossard, Bernie Schurch, Floriana Frasetto	
1974	The Performance Group	The Tooth of Crime (Sam Shepard)	Cambridge Street Studio	Richard Schechner	Spalding Gray	
1975	Prospect Theatre Company	Pilgrim (Jane McCulloch, adaptation and lyrics based on John Bunyan)	The Assembly Hall	Toby Robertson	Paul Jones	
1975	The Royal Lyceum Theatre Company of Edinburgh	How Mad Tulloch Was Taken Away (John Morris)	Royal Lyceum Theatre	Bill Bryden	Roddy McMillan	
1975	Nottingham Playhouse Company	As you like it (William Shakespeare)	Royal Lyceum Theatre	Peter Gill	John Price, Jane Lapotaire	
1975	Cooperativo Tiuscolano	Utopia (Aristophanes, adapted by Luca Ronconi)	Haymarket Ice Rink	Luca Ronconi		
1976	La Mama Company, New York	The Good Woman of Setzuan (Bertolt Brecht)	Moray House College	Andrei Serban	Priscilla Smith	
1976	La Mama Company, New York	Electra (Sophocles)	Moray House College	Andrei Serban	Priscilla Smith	
1976	La Mama Company, New York	Trojan Women (Euripides)	Moray House College	Andrei Serban	Priscilla Smith, Natalie Gray, Valois Mickens, Onni Johnson	
1976	Birmingham Repertory Company	Measure for Measure (William Shakespeare)	The Assembly Hall	Stuart Burge	Anna Calder-Marshall, David Burke, Bernard Lloyd, Peter Vaughan, Russell Hunter	
1976	Birmingham Repertory Company	The Devil is an Ass (Ben Jonson adapted by Peter Barnes)	The Assembly Hall	Stuart Burge	Anna Calder-Marshall, David Burke, Bernard Lloyd, Peter Vaughan, Russell Hunter	
1976	Oxford Playhouse Company	Pal Joey (music by Richard Rodgers and lyrics by Lorenz Hart after the book by John O'Hara)	Royal Lyceum Theatre	Philip Hedley	Bob Sherman, Pat Kirkwood	
1976	Bunraku, The National Puppet Theatre of Japan	Heike Nyogo no Shima (The Priest in Exile) and Sonezaki Shinju (The Double Suicide at Sonezaki)	Royal Lyceum Theatre	Nanba Haruo		
1976	Bunraku, The National Puppet Theatre of Japan	Ehon Taikoki (The Exploits of the Tycoon) and Shimpan Utazaimon (The Triangular Love)	Royal Lyceum Theatre	Nanba Haruo		
1976	Gruppo Teatro Libero Rome	Masaniello (Elvio Porta and Armando Pugliese)	Moray House College	Armando Pugliese		

== See also ==
- Edinburgh International Festival
- Drama at the Edinburgh International Festival: history and repertoire, 1947–1956
- Drama at the Edinburgh International Festival: history and repertoire, 1957–1966
- Opera at the Edinburgh International Festival: history and repertoire, 1947–1956
- Opera at the Edinburgh International Festival: history and repertoire, 1957–1966
- Opera at the Edinburgh International Festival: history and repertoire, 1967–1976
- Ballet at the Edinburgh International Festival: history and repertoire, 1947–1956
- Ballet at the Edinburgh International Festival: history and repertoire, 1957–1966
- Ballet at the Edinburgh International Festival: history and repertoire, 1967–1976
- Musicians at the Edinburgh International Festival, 1947–1956
- Musicians at the Edinburgh International Festival, 1957–1966
- Musicians at the Edinburgh International Festival, 1967–1976
- Visual Arts at the Edinburgh International Festival, 1947–1976
- World premieres at the Edinburgh International Festival
