= Ballet at the Edinburgh International Festival: history and repertoire, 1967–1976 =

Ballet continued to be a significant part of the Edinburgh International Festival during the third decade of the festival. However, in a period which saw increased concerts, staged operas, dramas and exhibitions, there was actually a reduction in the number of ballet companies coming to the festival, from 19 in 1957–1966 to 12 in 1967–1976.

Also relatively fewer performances were at the Empire Theatre, with the smaller King's Theatre, Lyceum Theatre, and Church Hill Theatre all being used as alternative venues.

== List ==
Date	Company	Ballet	Venue	Choreographer(s)	Principal dancers	Notes and sources
1967	New York City Ballet	Bugaku, Movements for Piano and orchestra, Tarantella, Ragtime, Apollo, Donizetti Variations, Concerto Barocco, Tschaikovsky Pas de Deux, Meditation (Tchaikovsky), Agon, Brahms–Schoenberg Quartet, Ebony Concerto	Empire Theatre	George Balanchine, John Taras (Ebony Concerto)	Jacques d'Amboise, Suzanne Farrell, Conrad Ludlow, Patricia McBride, Arthur Mitchell, Edward Villella,	
1968	Alvin Ailey American Dance Theater	Toccata, Reflections in D, Black District, Revelations, Congo Tango Palace, Credo, Metallics, Prodigal Prince, Jorney, Icarus, Knoxville: Summer 1915	Church Hill Theatre	Alvin Ailey	Judith Jamison, Dudley Williams, George Faison, Michael Peters	
1969	No ballet performances					
1970	Nederlands Dans Theater	Squares, Five Sketches, Nouvelles Aventures, Imaginary Film, Situation, Brandenburg, Solo for Voice 1, Mythical Hunters	Lyceum Theatre	Jaap Flier		
1971	Royal Danish Ballet	The Lesson, Carmen, The Lifeguards on Amager, Conservatoire, The Young Must Marry, Jeu de Cartes, Night Shadow	King's Theatre	Balanchine, Bournonville, Cranko, Flemming Flindt, Petit	Kirsten Simone, Anna Laerkesen, Henning Kronstam, Flemming Flindt	
1972	Ensemble National du Senegal		Lyceum Theatre	Maurice Sonar Senghor		
1973	Hungarian State Ballet	The Miraculous Mandarin, Spartacus	King's Theatre	László Seregi	Victor Fülöp, Ferenc Havas, Adél Orosz, Lila Pártay, Victor Róna, Vera Szumrák	
1974	Kathakali Dance Troupe, The Udyogamandai Kathakali Theatre	The Man-Lyon and the Rise of Ravana, The Ramayana, The Sons of Pandu, The Mahabharata	Lyceum Theatre			
1974	Bat-Dor Dance Company	Requiem for Sounds, Metallics, Palomas, The Wait, Couple, Movements in a Rocky Landscape	Church Hill Theatre	Gene Hill Sagan, Paul Sanasardo, Manuel Alum, Michael Descombey, Rudi van Dantzig		
1975	The Royal Ballet	Raymonda (Act III), Grosse Fuge, Romeo and Juliet (Balcony Scene), Prodigal Son, Concerto, Giselle, The Dream, Apollo, El amor brujo	King's Theatre		Margaret Barbieri, Alain Dubreuil, Stephen Jefferies, Ann Jenner, Nicholas Johnson, Brenda Last, Vyvyan Lorrayne, Rudolf Nureyev, Lynn Seymour, Lois Strike, Marion Tait	
1975	Nikolais Dance Theatre USA	Triple Duet from Grotto, Foreplay, Cross-Fade, Temple, Suite from Sanctum, Scenario	Lyceum Theatre	Alwin Nikolais		
1976	Ballet of the Deutsche Oper am Rhein	Passacaglia op 1 by Webern, Der Tod und das Madchen, Symphony no 3 (Scriabin)	King's Theatre	John Cranko, Erich Walter		
1976	Twyla Tharp Dance Company	Give and Take, The Duet from the Rags Suitre, Sue's Leg, The Bach Duet, The Fugue, The Eight Jelly Rolls	Lyceum Theatre	Twyla Tharp		

== See also ==
- Edinburgh International Festival
- Ballet at the Edinburgh International Festival: history and repertoire, 1947–1956
- Ballet at the Edinburgh International Festival: history and repertoire, 1957–1966
- Opera at the Edinburgh International Festival: history and repertoire, 1947–1956
- Opera at the Edinburgh International Festival: history and repertoire, 1957–1966
- Opera at the Edinburgh International Festival: history and repertoire, 1967–1976
- Drama at the Edinburgh International Festival: history and repertoire, 1947–1956
- Drama at the Edinburgh International Festival: history and repertoire, 1957–1966
- Drama at the Edinburgh International Festival: history and repertoire, 1967–1976
- Musicians at the Edinburgh International Festival, 1947–1956
- Musicians at the Edinburgh International Festival, 1957–1966
- Musicians at the Edinburgh International Festival, 1967–1976
- Visual Arts at the Edinburgh International Festival, 1947–1976
- World premieres at the Edinburgh International Festival
