= Drama at the Edinburgh International Festival: history and repertoire, 1957–1966 =

Drama remained an important part of the Edinburgh International Festival during its second decade. Almost all performances took place at the Royal Lyceum Theatre, The Assembly Hall, and the former Gateway Theatre.

More than 15 companies appeared during the decade, of which the most prolific were the London-based Old Vic Company and English Stage Company, the Royal Shakespeare Company from Stratford-upon-Avon, and the Edinburgh Gateway Company.

== List ==
Date	Company	Drama	Venue	Director	Principal actors	Notes and sources
1957	The English Stage Company	Nekrassov (Jean-Paul Sartre)	Royal Lyceum Theatre	George Devine	Robert Helpmann, Harry Corbett, George Benson	
1957	Henry Sherek	Man of Distinction (Walter Hasenclever)	Royal Lyceum Theatre	Denis Carey	Anton Walbrook, Moira Shearer, Eric Porter, Peter Bull, John Warner, Aubrey Richards, Prunella Scales	
1957	Compagnie Madeleine Renaud Jean-Louis Barrault	La Répétition ou l'Amour puni (Jean Anouilh)	Royal Lyceum Theatre	Jean-Louis Barrault	Madeleine Renaud, Jean-Louis Barrault, Pierre Bertin, Gabriel Cattand	
1957	Jean-Louis Barrault	Connaissance de Claudel	Royal Lyceum Theatre	Jean-Louis Barrault	Jean-Louis Barrault,	
1957	Stephen Mitchell	The Hidden King (Jonathan Griffin)	The Assembly Hall	Christopher West	Robert Eddison, Robert Speaight, Michael MacLiammoir, Sebastian Shaw, Ernest Thesiger	
1957	Edinburgh Gateway Company	The Flouers o Edinburgh (Robert McLellan)	Gateway Theatre	James Gibson	Lennox Milne, Duncan Macrae	
1957	John Gielgud	The Ages of Man (William Shakespeare, anthology by George Rylands)	Freemasons' Hall		John Gielgud	
1958	Henry Sherek	The Elder Statesman (T. S. Eliot)	Royal Lyceum Theatre	E. Martin Browne	Paul Rogers, Anna Massey, William Squire, Eileen Peel, Richard Gale, Alec McCowen, Dorothea Phillips, Geoffrey Kerr	
1958	Ulster Theatre Group	The Bonefire (Gerard McLarnon)	Royal Lyceum Theatre	Tyrone Guthrie	Colin Blakely, J. G. Devlin, James Ellis, Harold Goldblatt, Denys Hawthorne	
1958	New Watergate Theatre Club	Long Day's Journey into Night (Eugene O'Neill)	Royal Lyceum Theatre	José Quintero	Ian Bannen, Gwen Ffrangcon Davies, Anthony Quayle	
1958	The Old Vic Company	Twelfth Night (William Shakespeare)	Royal Lyceum Theatre	Michael Benthall	Joss Ackland, Peter Cellier, James Culliford, Judi Dench, Jane Downs, Gerald Harper, Barbara Jefford, John Neville, Richard Wordsworth	
1958	The Old Vic Company	Mary Stuart (Friedrich Schiller)	The Assembly Hall	Peter Wood	Dennis Chinnery, James Culliford, Derek Francis, Edward Hardwicke, Barrie Ingham, Catherine Lacey, Ronald Lewis, Jack May, John Phillips, Irene Worth	
1958	Edinburgh Gateway Company	Weir of Hermiston (R. J. B. Sellar), adapted from Robert Louis Stevenson	Gateway Theatre	Brian Carey	Pamela Bain, Tom Fleming, Lennox Milne, William Simpson, Frank Wylie	
1959	The Old Vic Company	The Double Dealer (William Congreve)	Royal Lyceum Theatre	Michael Benthall	Donald Houston, John Justin, John Woodvine, Joss Ackland, Alec McCowen, Miles Malleson, Ursula Jeans, Judi Dench, Moyra Fraser, Maggie Smith	
1959	Birmingham Repertory Theatre Company	Gammer Gurton's Needle (1575) and Fratricide Punished	Royal Lyceum Theatre	Bernard Hepton		
1959	The English Stage Company	Cock-a-Doodle Dandy (Seán O'Casey)	Royal Lyceum Theatre	George Devine	Berto Pasuka, J. G. Devlin, Wilfred Lawson, Pauline Flanagan, Joan O'Hara, Etain O'Dell, Eamon Keane	
1959	Wharton Productions Ltd	Ane Satyre of the Thrie Estaites (Sir David Lindsay)	The Assembly Hall	Tyrone Guthrie	Duncan Macrae, Bryden Murdoch, Eric Woodburn, Andrew Keir, John Cairney, Tom Fleming, Roddy McMillan, Walter Carr	
1959	The Perth Theatre Company	Breakspear in Gascony (Eric Linklater)	Gateway Theatre	Julian Herington	Christopher Burgess	
1959	The Dundee Repertory Company	Candida (George Bernard Shaw)	Gateway Theatre	Raymond Westwell	Rowena Cooper, Raymond Westwell	
1959	The Glasgow Citizens' Theatre	The Baikie Charivari (James Bridie)	Gateway Theatre	Peter Duguid	Ian Cuthbertson	
1960		The Wallace (Sydney Goodsir Smith)	The Assembly Hall	Peter Potter	Iain Cuthbertson	
1960	The Old Vic Company	The Seagull (Anton Chekhov)	Royal Lyceum Theatre	John Fernald	Judith Anderson, Ann Bell, Tony Britton, Tom Courtenay	
1960	La Compagnie Roger Planchon	Les Trois Mousquetaires (Dumas)	Royal Lyceum Theatre	Roger Planchon	Roger Planchon	
1960	Lynoq Productions	The Dream of Peter Mann (Bernard Kops)	Royal Lyceum Theatre	Frank Dunlop	Hermione Baddeley, Robert Hardy	
1960	The Glasgow Citizens' Theatre	Romulus the Great (Friedrich Dürrenmatt translated by Nell Moody)	Gateway Theatre	Callum Mill	Joe Greig	
1960	Edinburgh Gateway Company	Mary Stuart in Scotland (B Bjørnson translated by Elizabeth Sprigge)	Gateway Theatre	Richard Mathews		
1961	The Old Vic Company	Doctor Faustus (Christopher Marlowe)	The Assembly Hall	Michael Benthall	Paul Daneman, Michael Goodliffe, Walter Hudd	
1961	The Old Vic Company	King John (William Shakespeare)	The Assembly Hall	Peter Potter	Maurice Denham, Paul Daneman	
1961	The English Stage Company and Oscar Lewenstein	Luther (John Osborne)	Empire Theatre	Tony Richardson	Albert Finney	
1961	The Old Vic Company	Sappho (Lawrence Durrell)	Royal Lyceum Theatre	John Hale	Margaret Rawlings	
1961	Jan de Blieck and L'Association Française d'Action Artistique	Le Misanthrope (Molière)	Royal Lyceum Theatre	Bernard Dhéran	Bernard Dhéran	
1961	Jan de Blieck and L'Association Française d'Action Artistique	Jean de la Lune (Marcel Achard)	Royal Lyceum Theatre	Bernard Dhéran	Bernard Dhéran	
1961	The English Stage Company	August for the People (Nigel Dennis)	Royal Lyceum Theatre	George Devine	Rex Harrison	
1961	Edinburgh Gateway Company	Let Wives Tak' Tent (Robert Kemp after Molière)	Gateway Theatre	Tom Fleming	Duncan Macrae	
1962	Royal Shakespeare Company	Troilus and Cressida (William Shakespeare)	Royal Lyceum Theatre	Peter Hall	Max Adrian, Ian Holm, Dorothy Tutin, Derek Godfrey, John Nettleton, Maxine Audley	
1962	Royal Shakespeare Company	The Devils (John Whiting)	Royal Lyceum Theatre	Peter Wood	Max Adrian, Dorothy Tutin, Richard Johnson, Marian Diamond	
1962	Royal Shakespeare Company	Curtmantle (Christopher Fry)	Royal Lyceum Theatre	Stuart Burge	Maxine Audley, Derek Godfrey, Alan Dobie	
1962	Garvase Fajeon and Richard O'Donoghue	The Doctor and the Devils (Dylan Thomas)	The Assembly Hall	Callum Mill	Leonard Maguire	
1962	Edinburgh Gateway Company	Young Auchinleck (Robert McLellan)	Gateway Theatre	Kenneth Parrott	John Cairney	
1963	Frith Banbury	The Unshaven Cheek (Ray Lawler)	Royal Lyceum Theatre	Frith Banbury		
1963	The 59 Theatre Company	When We Dead Awaken (Henrik Ibsen translated by Michael Meyer)	Royal Lyceum Theatre			
1963	The English Stage Company	The Ceremony (Ionesco, translated by Donald Watson)	Royal Lyceum Theatre		Alec Guinness	
1963	Marlan Productions	The Rabbit Race (Martin Walser, translated by Ronald Duncan)	The Assembly Hall			
1963	Chichester Festival Theatre	Saint Joan (George Bernard Shaw)	The Assembly Hall			
1963	Edinburgh Gateway Company	All in Good Faith (Roddy MacMillan)	Gateway Theatre			
1964	Michael White	Hamp (John Wilson, based on a story by J L Hodson)	Royal Lyceum Theatre	John Gibson	John Hurt, Malcolm Tierney, Richard Briers, Leonard Rossiter, Noel Coleman	
1964	Theatre Workshop	Henry IV, Part 1, Henry IV, Part 2 (adapted from William Shakespeare)	The Assembly Hall	Joan Littlewood	George Sewell, John Antrobus, Julian Glover	
1964	Bristol Old Vic Company	Henry V (William Shakespeare)	Royal Lyceum Theatre	Stuart Burge	Richard Pasco	
1964	Bristol Old Vic Company	Love's Labour's Lost (William Shakespeare)	Royal Lyceum Theatre	Val May	David Dodimead, Richard Pasco, Michael Jayston, Peter Baldwin	
1964	Edinburgh Gateway Company	The Golden Legend of Shults (James Bridie)	Gateway Theatre	Victor Carin	Alex McAvoy	
1965	Haizlip and Stoiber Productions	The Amen Corner (James Baldwin)	Royal Lyceum Theatre	Lloyd G Richards	Claudia McNeil, Antonio Fargas, Julius W Harris	
1965	Il Teatro Stabile di Genova	I Due Gemelli Veneziani (Carlo Goldoni)	Royal Lyceum Theatre	Luigi Squarzina	Alberto Lionello	
1965	Peter Bridge	Too True to Be Good (George Bernard Shaw)	Royal Lyceum Theatre	Frank Dunlop	Dora Bryan, George Cole, Kenneth Haigh, June Ritchie, Athene Seyler, Alastair Sim	
1965	Traverse Festival Productions	Macbeth (William Shakespeare)	Assembly Hall	Michael Geliot	Donald Bisset, Duncan Macrae, Leonard Maguire, Alex McAvoy, Meg Wynn Owen, Henry Stamper	
1965	Edinburgh Gateway Company	The Man from Thermopylae (Ada F. Kay)	Gateway Theatre	Richard Matthews		
1966	Royal Lyceum Theatre Company	The Burdies (Adaptation by Douglas Young of the play by Aristophanes)	Royal Lyceum Theatre	Tom Fleming	Callum Mill, Harry Walker	
1966	Piraikon Theatron	Electra (Sophocles)	Royal Lyceum Theatre	Dimitrios Rondiris		
1966	Piraikon Theatron	Medea (Euripides)	Royal Lyceum Theatre	Dimitrios Rondiris		
1966	Michael Codron	A Present from the Past (John Hailstone)	Royal Lyceum Theatre	Robert Chetwyn	Renée Asherson, Gwen Ffrangcon-Davies	
1966	Pop Theatre	The Winter's Tale (William Shakespeare)	The Assembly Hall	Frank Dunlop	Lawrence Harvey, David Sumner, Moira Redmond	
1966	Pop Theatre	The Trojan Women (English version by Ronald Duncan of the adaptation by Jean-Paul Sartre of the play by Euripides)	The Assembly Hall	Frank Dunlop	Flora Robson, Jane Asher, Moira Redmond, Cleo Laine	
1966	The Moscow Puppets		Gateway Theatre	Sergei Obraztsov		
1966	Traverse Theatre Club	Lorca (Bettina Jonič)	Gateway Theatre	Ande Anderson	Tom Beckley and Bettina Jonič	
1966	Polish Mime Theatre, Wrocław	Jeselka, The Labyrinth, A woman's Gown, Marathon, The Dream, The Post Office	Church Hill Theatre	Henryk Tomaszewski	Stanisław Brzozowski, Stefan Niedzialkowski	
1966	John Ridley Productions Ltd	The Wrong Side of the Moon (Nicholas Stuart Gray)	Gateway Theatre			

== See also ==
- Edinburgh International Festival
- Drama at the Edinburgh International Festival: history and repertoire, 1947–1956
- Drama at the Edinburgh International Festival: history and repertoire, 1967–1976
- Opera at the Edinburgh International Festival: history and repertoire, 1947–1956
- Opera at the Edinburgh International Festival: history and repertoire, 1957–1966
- Opera at the Edinburgh International Festival: history and repertoire, 1967–1976
- Ballet at the Edinburgh International Festival: history and repertoire, 1947–1956
- Ballet at the Edinburgh International Festival: history and repertoire, 1957–1966
- Ballet at the Edinburgh International Festival: history and repertoire, 1967–1976
- Musicians at the Edinburgh International Festival, 1947–1956
- Musicians at the Edinburgh International Festival, 1957–1966
- Musicians at the Edinburgh International Festival, 1967–1976
- Visual Arts at the Edinburgh International Festival, 1947–1976
- World premieres at the Edinburgh International Festival
