= Ballet at the Edinburgh International Festival: history and repertoire, 1957–1966 =

Ballet continued to be an important part of the Edinburgh International Festival during the second decade of the festival. As at the beginning, most performances took place at the Empire Theatre, later to be refurbished to become the Edinburgh Festival Theatre.

In addition to London's The Royal Ballet who came in 1960, there were a total of 16 visiting companies from abroad who came to the city, offering varied programmes for festival goers.

== List ==
1957	Royal Swedish Ballet	Giselle, The Prodigal Son, Gaîté Parisienne, Cupid Out of His Humour, Sisyphus, Miss Julie	Empire Theatre	Birgit Akesson, Ivo Cramer, Birgit Cullberg, Albert Kozlovsky, Maria Skeaping	
1957	Les Ballets Africains de Keita Fodéba		Empire Theatre		Keita Fodéba
1957	Grand Ballet du Marquis de Cuevas (Le Grand Ballet de Monte Carlo)	Les Sylphides, La femme muette, La cygne noir, Petrouchka, Concerto Barocco, Song of Undying Sorrow, Spectre de la rose, La Tertulia	Empire Theatre		
1958	Ballets Premières (The Edinburgh Festival Society in association with Michael Frostick)	Concerto for Dancers, Circle of Love, The Night and Silence, Les facheuses recontres, Secrets, Octet, Dreams, Midsummer's Vigil, The Great Peacock, La belle dame sans merci, The Seventh Sacrament, Changement de pieds	Empire Theatre		
1959	Les Ballets Babilée	Suite en blanc, Variation, Orphée, Balances a trois, Balletino, Le jeune homme et la mort, La création, Fugue, La boucle, Adagio, Divertimento, Sable, L'emprise	Empire Theatre		Jean Babilée, Claire Sombert, Gérard Ohn, Iovanka Biegovitch, Adolpho Andrade
1959	National Ballet of Finland	L'épreuve d'amour, Scaramouche, Don Quichotte, Circle of Roses, Valse Triste, Dance of the Spider, Three Harlequins, Black Swan: Pas de Deux, Giselle	Empire Theatre		
1959	Jerome Robbins' Ballets: USA	N.Y. Export: Opus Jazz, Afternoon of a Faun, Moves (A Ballet in Silence), The Concert	Empire Theatre	Jerome Robbins	
1960	The Royal Ballet	Danses Concertantes, Baiser de la fée, Petrushka, Ballabile, La Péri, The Prince of the Pagodas (Act 3)	Empire Theatre	Frederick Ashton, John Cranko, Kenneth MacMillan	Margot Fonteyn, Nadia Nerina, Svetlana Beriosova
1960	Susana y José, Madrid	The Ballad of Carmen and Don José, Spanish Folk Dances	Empire Theatre		
1960	Little Ballet Troupe, Bombay	Panchatantra, Ramayana	Empire Theatre		
1960	Ballet Européen of Nervi	Schéhérazade, Choreartium, Le Beau Danube, Commedia Umana	Empire Theatre	Léonide Massine	
1961	'Triple Bill' with the Western Theatre Ballet	Salade, Renard, The Seven Deadly Sins	Empire Theatre	Kenneth Macmillan, Alfredo Rodrigues, Peter Darrell,	
1962	Belgrade Opera Ballet	The Infanta's Birthday, The Miraculous Mandarin, Koštana	Kings Theatre	Dimitrije Parlić	
1962	Ballet du XXe Siècle, Théâtre Royal de la Monnaie	The Four Sons of Aymon	Murrayfield Ice Rink	Jeanine Charrat, Maurice Béjart	
1963	Budapest Opera and Ballet	The Wooden Prince and The Miraculous Mandarin together with the opera Prince Bluebeard's Castle, Divertissement from The Beggar Student, The Bride's Kerchief, Gayaneh (Act 3)	Empire Theatre	Gyula Harangozó	
1963	Martha Graham and Dance Company	Clytemnestra, Acrobats of God, Diversion of Angels, Embattled Garden, Legend of Judith, Night Journey, Phaedra, Secular Games, Seraphic Dialogue	Empire Theatre	Martha Graham	
1963	Stuttgart State Theatre Ballet	The Catalyst, Suite, Daphnis and Chloé, L'estro armonico, Variations, Musical Chairs	Empire Theatre	John Cranko	
1964	Les Ballets Africains, The National Company of Guinea	Bagatai, The Forest, Toutoudiarra, Midnight, Ferekoreka, Soundiata, Doudoumba, Tirankee	Royal Lyceum Theatre	Amadou Sissoko	
1965	No ballet performances				
1966	Paul Taylor Dance Company	Junction, Three Epitaphs, Duet, Orbs, Aureole, From Sea to Shing Sea, Scudorama	Church Hill Theatre	Paul Taylor	Paul Taylor, Dan Wagoner, Bettie de Jong

== See also ==
- Edinburgh International Festival
- Ballet at the Edinburgh International Festival: history and repertoire, 1947–1956
- Ballet at the Edinburgh International Festival: history and repertoire, 1967–1976
- Opera at the Edinburgh International Festival: history and repertoire, 1947–1956
- Opera at the Edinburgh International Festival: history and repertoire, 1957–1966
- Opera at the Edinburgh International Festival: history and repertoire, 1967–1976
- Drama at the Edinburgh International Festival: history and repertoire, 1947–1956
- Drama at the Edinburgh International Festival: history and repertoire, 1957–1966
- Drama at the Edinburgh International Festival: history and repertoire, 1967–1976
- Musicians at the Edinburgh International Festival, 1947–1956
- Musicians at the Edinburgh International Festival, 1957–1966
- Musicians at the Edinburgh International Festival, 1967–1976
- Visual Arts at the Edinburgh International Festival, 1947–1976
- World premieres at the Edinburgh International Festival
