= Drama at the Edinburgh International Festival: history and repertoire, 1947–1956 =

Drama was an important part of the Edinburgh International Festival from its earliest days, with performances taking place at the Royal Lyceum Theatre, the Assembly Hall, the Gateway Theatre and occasionally in other venues.

The first company to appear was The Old Vic Theatre Company who returned many times later, together with a series of visiting companies from Britain and abroad.

== List ==
Date	Company	Drama	Venue	Director	Principal actors	Notes and sources
1947	The Old Vic Theatre Company	The Taming of the Shrew (Shakespeare)	Royal Lyceum Theatre	John Burrell		
1947	The Old Vic Theatre Company	King Richard II (Shakespeare)	Royal Lyceum Theatre	Ralph Richardson		
1947	Le compagnie Jouvet de Théâtre de l'Athénée	L'école des femmes (Molière)	Royal Lyceum Theatre			
1947	Le compagnie Jouvet de Théâtre de l'Athénée	Ondine (Jean Giraudoux)	Royal Lyceum Theatre			
1948	La Compagnie Madeleine Renaud Jean-Louis Barrault	Hamlet (Shakespeare)	Royal Lyceum Theatre			
1948	La Compagnie Madeleine Renaud Jean-Louis Barrault	Les Fausses Confidences (Marivaux) and Baptiste (Jacques Prévert)	Royal Lyceum Theatre	Jean-Louis Barrault		
1948	Tennent Productions	Medea (Euripides, adapted by Robinson Jeffers)	Royal Lyceum Theatre	John Gielgud	Eileen Herlie, Hector MacGregor, Ralph Michael, Elspeth March, Cathleen Nesbitt,	
1948	The Scottish Theatre	Ane Satyre of the Thrie Estaites (Sir David Lindsay)	The Assembly Hall	Tyrone Guthrie		
1949	Sherek Players	The Cocktail Party (T. S. Eliot) World premiere	Royal Lyceum Theatre	E. Martin Browne	Alec Guinness	
1949	Sherek Players	The Man in the Raincoat (Peter Ustinov) World premiere	Royal Lyceum Theatre	Peter Ustinov		
1949	Düsseldorf Theatre Company	Faust (Goethe) Part One	Royal Lyceum Theatre	Gustav Gründgens	Horst Caspar, Gustav Gründgens, Antje Weisgerber	
1949	The Scottish Theatre	Ane Satyre of the Thrie Estaites (Sir David Lindsay)	The Assembly Hall	Tyrone Guthrie		
1949	The Scottish Theatre	The Gentle Shepherd (Allan Ramsay)	The Royal High School	Tyrone Guthrie		
1950	Glasgow Citizens' Theatre	The Queen's Comedy (James Bridie) World premiere	Royal Lyceum Theatre	Tyrone Guthrie, John Casson		
1950	Glasgow Citizens' Theatre	The Atom Doctor (Eric Linklater)	Royal Lyceum Theatre	Tyrone Guthrie		
1950	Glasgow Citizens' Theatre	Douglas (Rev John Home)	Royal Lyceum Theatre	John Casson	Sybil Thorndike, Lewis Casson	
1950	The Old Vic Theatre Company	Bartholomew Fair (Ben Jonson)	The Assembly Hall	George Devine		
1951	Henry Sherek	Pygmalion (Bernard Shaw)	Royal Lyceum Theatre	Peter Potter	Margaret Lockwood, Alan Webb, Charles Victor, R Stuart Lindsell	
1951	Tennent Productions	The Winter's Tale (Shakespeare)	Royal Lyceum Theatre	Peter Brook	John Gielgud, Diana Wynyard, Flora Robson, Lewis Casson	
1951	Le Théâtre de l'Atelier, Paris	L'enterrement (Henry Monnier) and Le Bal des voleurs (Jean Anouilh)	Royal Lyceum Theatre	André Barsacq		
1951	Le Théâtre de l'Atelier, Paris	Le Rendez-vous de Senlis (Jean Anouilh)	Royal Lyceum Theatre	André Barsacq		
1951	Glasgow Citizens' Theatre	Ane Satyre of the Thrie Estaites (Sir David Lindsay)	The Assembly Hall	Tyrone Guthrie, Moultrie Kelsall		
1952	Henry Sherek	The Player King (Christopher Hassall)	Royal Lyceum Theatre	Norman Marshall		
1952	The Edinburgh Festival Society	Bleak House, an adaptation (Dickens)	Royal Lyceum Theatre		Emlyn Williams	
1952	The Old Vic Trust and Glasgow Citizen's Theatre	The Highland Fair (Joseph Mitchell)	The Assembly Hall	Tyrone Guthrie		
1952	The Old Vic Trust	Romeo and Juliet (Shakespeare)	The Assembly Hall	Hugh Hunt	Claire Bloom, Alan Badel, Athene Seyler, Peter Finch, Lewis Casson	
1953	Henry Sherek	The Confidential Clerk (T.S. Eliot) World premiere	Royal Lyceum Theatre	E. Martin Browne		
1953	Le Théâtre National Populaire, Paris	L'Avare (Molière)	Royal Lyceum Theatre	Jean Vilar		
1953	Le Théâtre National Populaire, Paris	Richard II (William Shakespeare)	Royal Lyceum Theatre	Jean Vilar		
1953	Le compagnie de mime Marcel Marceau, Paris	A programme of Pantomimes and Mimodrames	Royal Lyceum Theatre			
1953	The Old Vic Trust	Hamlet (Shakespeare)	The Assembly Hall	Michael Benthall	Richard Burton, Claire Bloom, Fay Compton, John Chandos	
1953	Glasgow Citizen's Theatre	The Highland Fair (Joseph Mitchell)	The Assembly Hall	Tyrone Guthrie		
1954	Tennent Productions	The Matchmaker (Thornton Wilder)	Royal Lyceum Theatre	Tyrone Guthrie		
1954	Le Comédie Française	Le Bourgeois gentilhomme (Molière)	Royal Lyceum Theatre	Jean Meyer		
1954	The Old Vic Trust	Macbeth (Shakespeare)	The Assembly Hall	Michael Benthall	Paul Rogers, Ann Todd, Eric Porter	
1954	The Old Vic Trust	A Midsummer Night's Dream (Shakespeare)	Empire Theatre	Michael Benthall		
1954	The Edinburgh Gateway Company	The Other Dear Charmer (Robert Kemp)	Gateway Theatre	Peter Potter		
1955	The Old Vic Trust	Julius Caesar (Shakespeare)	Royal Lyceum Theatre	Michael Benthall	Gerald Cross, John Neville, Paul Rogers	
1955	Edwige Feuillère and her company	La Dame aux Camélias (Dumas)	Royal Lyceum Theatre	Edwige Feuillère	Edwige Feuillère	
1955	Tennent Productions	A Life in the Sun (Thornton Wilder)	The Assembly Hall	Tyrone Guthrie	Michael Goodliffe, Irene Worth	
1956	Tennent Productions with Henry Sherek	Under Milk Wood (Dylan Thomas)	Royal Lyceum Theatre	Douglas Cleverdon, Edward Burnham	Donald Houston, Joan Newell, Peter Halliday, Gareth Jones	
1956	Piccolo Teatro, Milan	Arlecchino, The Servant of Two Masters (Carlo Goldoni) and Questa sera si recita a soggetto (Luigi Pirandello)	Royal Lyceum Theatre	Giorgio Strehler	Tino Carraro, Checco Rissone	
1956	Henry Sherek	Fanny's First Play and Village Wooing (George Bernard Shaw)	Royal Lyceum Theatre	Douglas Seale, Roy Rich	Michael Denison, Brenda Bruce, Jacqueline Mackenzie	
1956	The Stratford Ontario Festival Company	Henry V (William Shakespeare)	The Assembly Hall	Michael Langham	Wliiam Needles, Christopher Plummer, Douglas Campbell, Bruno Gerussi, Tony Van Bridge	
1956	The Stratford Ontario Festival Company	Oedipus Rex (Sophocles) in the translation by W. B. Yeats	The Assembly Hall	Tyrone Guthrie	Douglas Campbell, Eleanor Stuart, Robert Goodier, Donald Davis	
1956	The Edinburgh Gateway Company	The Anatomist (James Bridie)	Gateway Theatre	James Gibson		

== See also ==
- Edinburgh International Festival
- Drama at the Edinburgh International Festival: history and repertoire, 1957–1966
- Drama at the Edinburgh International Festival: history and repertoire, 1967–1976
- Opera at the Edinburgh International Festival: history and repertoire, 1947–1956
- Opera at the Edinburgh International Festival: history and repertoire, 1957–1966
- Opera at the Edinburgh International Festival: history and repertoire, 1967–1976
- Ballet at the Edinburgh International Festival: history and repertoire, 1947–1956
- Ballet at the Edinburgh International Festival: history and repertoire, 1957–1966
- Ballet at the Edinburgh International Festival: history and repertoire, 1967–1976
- Musicians at the Edinburgh International Festival, 1947 to 1956
- Musicians at the Edinburgh International Festival, 1957–1966
- Musicians at the Edinburgh International Festival, 1967–1976
- Visual Arts at the Edinburgh International Festival, 1947–1976
- World premieres at the Edinburgh International Festival
