= Joan Alexander (soprano) =

Scottish soprano (1912–2010)

Joan Alexander (1 December 1912 – 25 December 2010) was a Scottish soprano well-known for her appearances on the Third Programme and regional radio stations.

Alexander was educated at Hyndland School, the Royal Scottish Academy of Music and Drama and then from 1933 the Munich Conservatoire. She gave many acclaimed performances at the Edinburgh Festival and performed at a number of Proms. She appeared on BBC radio programmes from 1933 through to 1968. She appeared as 'Antonia's Mother' in the 1951 film The Tales of Hoffmann. She performed Thea Musgrave's song cycle 'A Suite o Bairnsangs' (words by Maurice Lindsay).
