= Haymarket Ice Rink =

Sports venue in Edinburgh, Scotland

Haymarket Ice Rink was a former ice skating and curling venue in Edinburgh, Scotland, which opened in 1912 and closed in 1978.

It was constructed following the availability of land resulting from the relocation of James Swan's cattle market to Chesser, and was sited near to Haymarket railway station. The venue was home to the Bellshill Curling Club, and when it closed, the club relocated to the new curling rink at Murrayfield Ice Rink.
