= László Seregi =

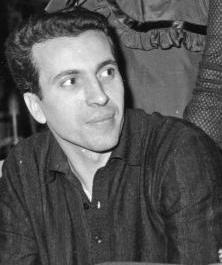
László Seregi

László Seregi (1929 – 11 May 2012) was a Hungarian dancer and choreographer who served as the primary choreographer of the National Opera of Budapest.

== Biography ==
László Seregi (birth name László Stern) was born in Budapest. Of Jewish descent, his parents were Ferenc Széplaki (Stern) and Margit Kerekes (Kohn). He originally wished to become a graphics designer. In 1949, however, he changed directions and pursued a career in dance. He studied traditional dance with Iván Szabó and classical dance with Marcella Nádasi.

As a character dancer for the opera of Budapest, where he began performing 1957, Seregi advanced in the company to eventually become a master of ballet in 1967. He then became the ballet director from 1977 to 1984. He was responsible for the opera's folk dances in the 1950s, and then for Opera performances in the 1960s, including Gounod's Faust, Wagner's Tannhaüser. In 1968, he choreographed "Spartacus'", his first ballet in three acts with the Soviet Armenian composer Aram Khachaturian. He achieved a similarly international success with Bela Bartók's ballets, with the new productions of The Wooden Prince and The Miraculous Mandarin in 1970.

His work has been widely recognized in Hungary and abroad, having performed and presented performances in theaters and Opera houses in Moscow, Rome, Prague, Bordeaux, Edinburgh, Cologne, Saint Petersburg, Kyiv, Berlin, Monte Carlo, Vienna, Salzburg, Paris, Turin, London, Zurich and Sydney.

László Seregi died on May 11, 2012, in Budapest at the age of 83.

== Principal works ==
- Folk dance choreographies: Dances of Kalotaszeg, Morning in the Camp, dances from The Spinning Room
- Opera dance interludes and musical theatre choreographies: The Beggar Student, Guillaume Tell, Un amour électronique, Faust, Tannhäuser, Cats
- Film: The Girl Who Was Danced Into Life
- One-act ballets: The Wooden Prince, The Miraculous Mandarin, Air, On the Town, Serenade, Chamber Music No. 1, Variations on a Children's Song
- Grand ballets: Spartacus, Sylvia, The Cedar, Romeo and Juliet, A Midsummer Night's Dream, The Taming of the Shrew

== Award and recognition ==
László Seregi won many awards and distinctions both in Hungary and abroad, including

- Ferenc Erkel Award (1969),
- Hungarian Artist of Merit (1972),
- National Council of Trade Unions Award (1975),
- Austrian Order of Merit (1976),
- Hungarian Artist of Excellence (1978),
- Kossuth Prize (1980),
- Order of the Flag of the Hungarian People's Republic with Laurel Wreath (1989),
- Master Artist of the Hungarian State Opera (2003),
- Lifetime Achievement Award of the Hungarian Dance Association (2003),
- Middle Cross with Star of the Hungarian Order of Merit (2004),
- Prima Primissima Prize (2005).
