= William McAlpine (tenor) =

British tenor

William McAlpine (3 December 1922 – 2 February 2004) was a leading British tenor during the 1950s and 1960s. He created roles in two operas by Benjamin Britten— A Novice in Billy Budd and The Spirit of the Masque in Gloriana. He also sang Andres in the UK premiere of Berg's Wozzeck.

McAlpine was born in Stenhousemuir, Scotland and initially worked as bricklayer before studying at the Guildhall School of Music. He made his stage debut in 1951 as the third Jew in a revival of Richard Strauss's Salome at the Royal Opera House, and went on to sing several roles there and at the Sadlers Wells company, which he joined in 1956 as a principal tenor. He later sang with the Scottish Opera and Glyndebourne Festival Opera as well as in Berlin, Prague, and Paris. After his retirement from the stage, he taught singing at the Guildhall School of Music. He died in Surrey at the age of 81 following a heart attack after one of his teaching sessions at Guildhall.
