= Ian Whyte (conductor) =

Scottish composer and pianist (1901–1960)

Ian Whyte (13 August 1901 – 27 March 1960) was a Scottish conductor and composer, and founder of the BBC Scottish Symphony Orchestra.

Born in Dunfermline, Whyte studied in London, and was a pupil of Stanford and Ralph Vaughan Williams at the Royal College of Music. He became head of BBC music in Scotland in 1931, holding the position until 1945. With Guy Warrack he founded the BBC Scottish Orchestra (later to become the BBC Scottish Symphony Orchestra), which Warrack conducted for the first ten years. Whyte took over as conductor in 1945 and stayed until 1960. He appointed young assistants to help with the orchestra that went on to be very influential in their own right: Alexander Gibson, Colin Davis and Bryden Thomson.

His own considerable output of compositions and arrangements includes the ballet Donald of the Burthens (produced at Covent Garden in 1951), influenced by Scottish themes and folk tunes. His Eightsome Reel for orchestra is a predecessor of Scottish light music for orchestra by Malcolm Arnold, Iain Hamilton, Thea Musgrave and others. There are also two symphonies, concertos for piano, violin and viola, three symphonic poems (Edinburgh, Tam o’ Shanter and The Rose Garden), three string quartets, and much else. The Scottish Music Information Centre holds 668 Whyte manuscripts, mostly unplayed.

He died in Glasgow, March 27, 1960.

== Selected works ==
Opera

- Comala
- The Forge
- The Tale of the Shepherds

Ballet

- Goblin Haa
- The Trout
- Donald of the Burthens

Orchestral

- Symphony No. 1 (1949)
- Symphony No. 2
- Edinburgh, symphonic poem (1945)
- Tam O’Shanter, symphonic poem
- The Rose Garden, symphonic poem
- The Treadmill, overture
- Oragif, overture
- Concert Overture
- Dunfermline, orchestral prelude
- Queen and Country, march
- Festival March (1945)
- Dark Lochnagar
- The Isle of Skye
- Glamis Castle
- Scottish Dances
- A Prayer
- Intermezzo
- Fighting for the Empire
- The Ghost of the Strath
- Eightsome Reel

Concertos

- Piano Concerto
- Violin Concerto
- Viola Concerto

Strings

- Airs and Dances from the Scottish Past (two sets)
- Interlude, Elegy and Melody

Vocal

- Sonnet 30 (Wordsworth) for chorus and strings
- Et Incarnatus Est
- The Beatitudes for soprano, chorus and orchestra
- Part songs and solo songs
- Scottish traditional song arrangements

Chamber

- Three string quartets
- Piano Quintet
- Violin Sonata

Piano Solo

- Piano Sonata
- Six Preludes (1925)
  - 'Scottish Humour'
  - 'Primavera'
  - 'The Casino'
  - 'Scottish Sabbath'
  - 'The Tyrrhenian Sea'
  - 'Cascade des Alpes'
- Canzonetta
- Pittencrief Suite
- Edinburgh Suite (1949)
  - 'St Giles'
  - 'Holyrood'
  - 'Princes Street'
