= Hōshō (Noh school) =

Japanese theatrical school

Hōshō (宝生) is a Japanese theatrical school. It specializes in Noh (能), a classic musical drama. Five schools specialize in shite (シテ, the role of protagonists in Noh): Kanze (観世), Hōshō (宝生), Kita (喜多), Kongō (金剛) and Komparu (金春). All schools except Kita were founded in Nara around 600 years ago. Kanze, Hōshō and Kita (derived from Kongō during Edo period) are mainly based in Tokyo, Japan.

Hōshō is the second largest of the schools (Kanze is the largest) and holds the main Noh theater in Bunkyō, near Tokyo Dome. Most Noh players who attend the school live in Tokyo, including the Sōke (宗家, the hereditary head of the family). Kanazawa (金沢, the capital of Kaga province) has been famous for Noh of Hōshō; the feudal lords of Kaga were ardent patrons of Hōshō Noh style. Similarly to Tokyo and Kanazawa, Hōshō was popular in Sado, Kurume, Nagoya and Kyoto.

== History ==
Founded by Kannami's eldest brother Hōshō Dayu, the Hōshō School originated from the Tobi-za, one of the four Yamato Sarugaku Yoza. The group eventually named themselves after their leading performer Hōshō Dayu. The fifth shōgun of the Tokugawa period was particularly taken by the Hōshō style and was their top patron. They were the favorite troupe in Kagahan (current Ishikawa area), and because of this, retain a strong influence in the noh of modern-day Tokyo as well as Hokuriku area. The 11th shōgun Ienari was fond of the Hōshō School. The Hōshō style is described as dignified and the "Hōshō Singing" is said to be sensitive and refined.

The style of Hōshō is described as "introspective", compared to Kanze. The choreography of Hōshō is simpler and more abstract, which may be more difficult to interpret. The Hōshō school has a complex musical scale in their songs, called Utai (謡). Utai has many different notes and melodies that frequently rise and fall. Due to its own system of Utai, they called the school "Utai Hōshō".

== Activities ==
Hosho performs several times a month, in both Tokyo and Kanazawa. In Tokyo, it organises two series of monthly performances by professional actors: "Goun (五雲, five clouds)", and "Tsukinami (月並, performed monthly)". The name of "Goun" comes from the symbol of Hōshō, which is drawn on fans during Hōshō training.
