= Renato Fasano =

Renato Fasano (Naples, August 21, 1902 – Rome, August 3, 1979) was an Italian conductor and musicologist particularly associated with 18th-century Italian works.

Having studied music in his native Naples, Fasano established in 1941 the chamber orchestra Collegium Musicum Italicum later renamed I Virtuosi di Roma. This small orchestra helped popularize Italian Baroque music. He conducted widely in Europe works by such composers as Corelli, Vivaldi, Pergolesi, Baldassarre Galuppi, Alessandro Marcello and Giovanni Paisiello. In addition, he founded the "Piccolo Teatro Musicale Italiano" in 1957. In 1971, he conducted an acclaimed tour through Southern Africa with his "Virtuosi di Roma" chamber orchestra and cellist Radu Aldulescu.

The best-known of Fasano's recordings (for RCA) is that of an opera by a non-Italian, Gluck's Orfeo ed Euridice, with Shirley Verrett, Anna Moffo and Judith Raskin as principals.

== Sources ==
- Le guide de l'opéra, Roland Mancini & Jean-Jacques Rouveroux, Fayard, 1986.
