= Ernest Lush =

English classical pianist

Ernest Lush (23 January 1908 – 12 May 1988) was an English classical pianist who was best known as an accompanist.

== Biography ==
Ernest Henry Lush was born in Bournemouth in 1908. His musical studies were with Tobias Matthay in London and Carl Friedberg in New York.

He made his first radio broadcast at the age of 15 in 1923. His concert debut came in 1927, with a concerto under the baton of Sir Dan Godfrey. He joined the BBC and became a senior staff accompanist, while continuing to be involved in chamber music, solo piano recitals and concerto appearances.

He appeared in a great many of the 93 concerts given between 1955 and 1967 under the auspices of the BBC Concert Orchestra at various venues outside London.

The roll of artists he accompanied includes: Janet Baker, Owen Brannigan, Alfredo Campoli, Suzanne Danco, Jacqueline du Pré (her very first recital), Kathleen Ferrier (her last broadcast recital), Pierre Fournier, Thomas Hemsley, Nathan Milstein, Ossy Renardy, Ruggiero Ricci, Peter Schidlof, Paul Schöffler, Elisabeth Schumann, Igor Stravinsky, Joan Sutherland, Inia Te Wiata, Jennifer Vyvyan and Ljuba Welitsch.

He can be seen in Video on YouTube, accompanying Nathan Milstein in "Asturiana" from Manuel de Falla's Spanish Popular Suite.

Ernest Lush died in 1988, aged 80, in Harrogate.
