= Joan Dickson =

Scottish cellist and cello teacher

- Born: 21 December 1921; Edinburgh, Scotland
- Died: 9 October 1994 (aged 72); London, England
- Other names: Katherine Joan Balfour Dickson
- Occupations: Cellist and cello teacher

Katherine Joan Balfour Dickson (21 December 1921 – 9 October 1994) was a Scottish cellist and cello teacher.

== Biography ==
Dickson was born in Edinburgh, Scotland on 21 December 1921 to Marjorie Balfour Lowe and Dr Douglas Dickson, a lawyer and Writer to the Signet.

She worked primarily in the United Kingdom, and was a professor at the Royal College of Music in London. She was also a notable performer, giving many duo recitals with her longtime partner Joyce Rathbone. Joan also collaborated regularly with her sister Hester, who was also a pianist, and a piano accompaniment lecturer at the Royal Conservatoire of Scotland until 2014.

She studied with Enrico Mainardi in Paris.

Her students included Moray Welsh, Ian Hampton, Melissa Phelps, Alexander Baillie, Richard Harwood, Andrew Shulman, Ruth Beauchamp and Louisa Tuck.

She died in London on 9 October 1994.

== Literature ==
- Margaret Campbell: "Joan Dickson". In: Grove Music Online. Oxford Music Online. 22. August 2012. (subscription required)
