= Church Hill Theatre =

Theatre in Edinburgh, Scotland

Church Hill Theatre Edinburgh
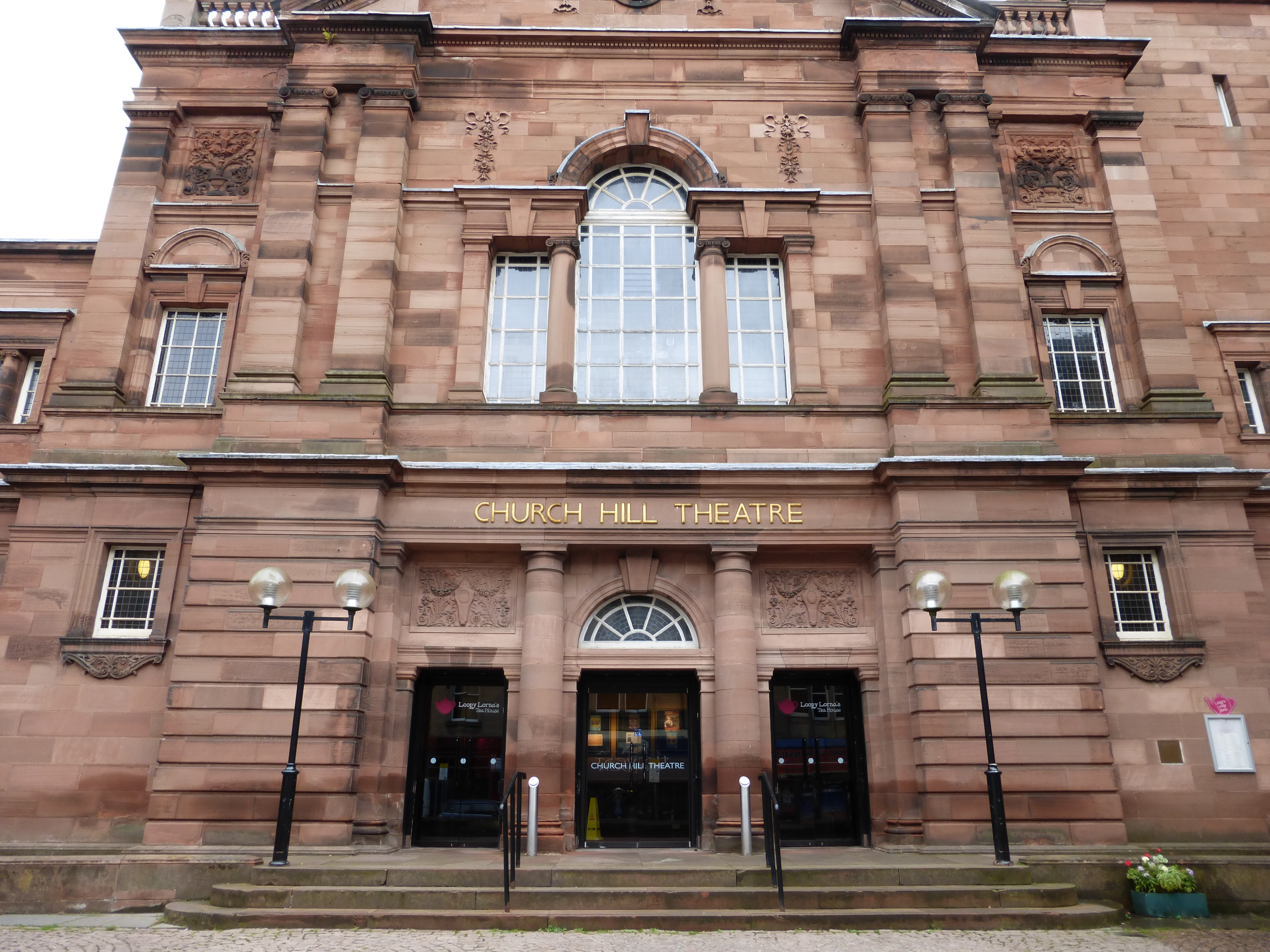
- Church Hill Theatre
- Interactive map of Church Hill Theatre Edinburgh
- Address: 33 Morningside Road, EH10 4DR; Edinburgh; Scotland
- Coordinates: 55.932817°N 3.210016°W
- Owner: City of Edinburgh Council
- Operator: City of Edinburgh Council
- Capacity: 353
- Current use: Theatre

Construction
- Built: 1892
- Reopened: 2006
- Architect: Hippolyte Blanc

Website
- http://www.assemblyroomsedinburgh.co.uk/assembly-rooms/the-church-hill-theatre.html

Church Hill Theatre is a Category B listed pink sandstone former church and current theatre venue owned by the Edinburgh City Council. Built originally as Morningside Free Church, the council purchased it in 1960. After undergoing an extensive refurbishment, it re-opened in August 2006. It is managed by the team operating the Assembly Rooms.

== History ==
It was built in 1892 as North Morningside Free Church to a design by Hippolyte Blanc and purchased by Edinburgh's town council in 1960.

== Current use ==
It is a popular venue for amateur drama productions, as well as for the Edinburgh Festival Fringe and Edinburgh International Festival. Some of the non-professional theatre and dance companies it hosts include Lothian Youth Arts And Musicals Company, Tempo, Showcase, Edinburgh Telephone Choir, Edinburgh Music Theatre Company, Leitheatre, Edinburgh University Footlights, Buckstone Youth Dance, Manor School of Ballet, the Edinburgh Makars, Threepenny Theatricals and Edinburgh Dance Academy.

== Facilities ==
The theatre auditorium seats 353, and the building has space for smaller functions. Since the renovation, there is now lift access to the auditorium, as well as a privately run cafe
