= Edinburgh International Festival =

Scottish annual performing arts festival

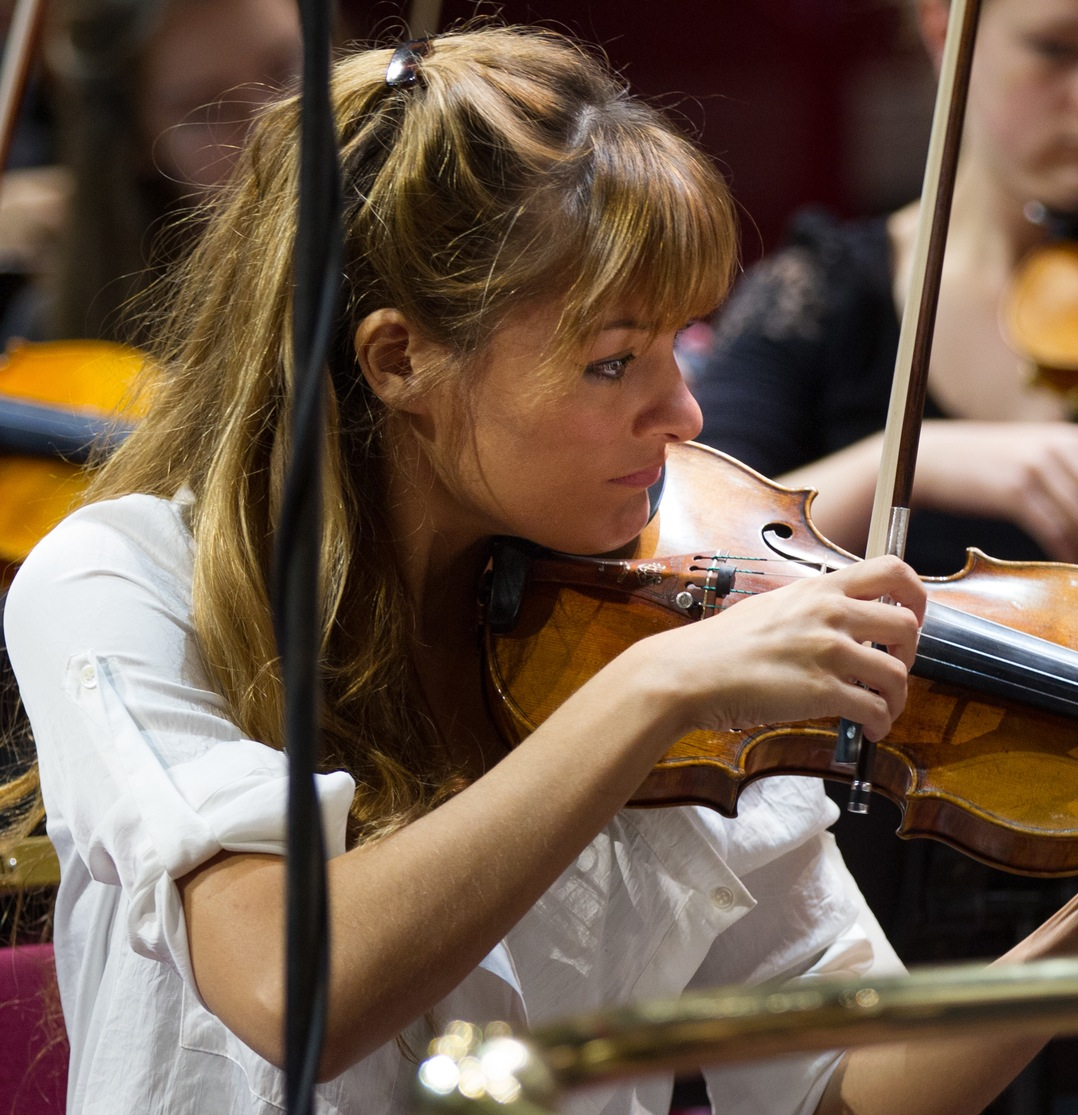
- Nicola Benedetti, Director of the Edinburgh International Festival from 2023
- Date: 2026: 7-30 August (exact dates vary each year)
- Frequency: Annual
- Locations: Edinburgh, Scotland
- Inaugurated: 1947
- Patrons: Queen Elizabeth the Queen Mother (1947–1952); Queen Elizabeth II (1952–2017); Prince Edward (2017–present)
- Website: www.eif.co.uk

The Edinburgh International Festival is an annual arts festival in Edinburgh, Scotland, spread over the final three weeks in August. Notable figures from the international world of music (especially classical music) and the performing arts are invited to join the festival. Visual art exhibitions, talks and workshops are also hosted.

The first 'International Festival of Music and Drama' took place between 22 August and 11 September 1947. Under the first festival director, the distinguished Austrian-born impresario Rudolf Bing, it had a broadly-based programme, covering orchestral, choral and chamber music, Lieder and song, opera, ballet, drama, film, and Scottish 'piping and dancing' on the Esplanade of Edinburgh Castle, a structure that was followed in subsequent years.

The Festival has taken place every year since 1947, except for 2020 when it was cancelled due to the COVID-19 pandemic. A scaled-back version of the festival was held in 2021.

The 2026 International Festival was underway by 22 August, including a performance of Strauss's Elektra by the BBC Scottish Symphony Orchestra.

== Festival directors ==
- 1947–1949: Sir Rudolf Bing, Austrian-born opera impresario who became General Manager of the Metropolitan Opera
- 1950–1955: Sir Ian Hunter, British impresario of classical music
- 1956–1960: Robert Ponsonby, British music administrator and BBC programmer
- 1961–1965: George Lascelles, 7th Earl of Harewood, British opera administrator, who worked for the Royal Opera House, English National Opera, and Opera North
- 1966–1978: Peter Diamand, Berlin-born arts administrator
- 1979–1983: Sir John Drummond, British arts administrator and BBC Radio 3 Controller
- 1984–1991: Frank Dunlop, British theatre director
- 1992–2006: Sir Brian McMaster, British arts administrator who worked at the Welsh National Opera
- October 2006–2014: Sir Jonathan Mills, Australian composer and arts administrator
- October 2014–2022: Fergus Linehan, Irish theatre producer and music administrator
- October 2022–: Nicola Benedetti, Scottish-Italian violinist

== Creation of the festival ==
The idea of a Festival with a remit to "provide a platform for the flowering of the human spirit" and enrich the cultural life of Scotland, Britain and Europe took form in the wake of the Second World War. The idea of creating an international festival within the UK was first conceived by Rudolf Bing, the General Manager of Glyndebourne Opera Festival, the arts patron Lady Rosebery, theatre director Sir Tyrone Guthrie, and Audrey Mildmay (wife of John Christie) during a wartime tour of a small-scale Glyndebourne production of The Beggar's Opera.

Rudolf Bing conceived of the festival to heal the wounds of war through the languages of the arts. This is its principal raison d'être. It was partly financed by Lord Rosebery with the £10,000 winnings of his horse Ocean Swell that won the Jockey Club Cup and the Derby in 1944. This sum was matched by Edinburgh Town Council and then some money in turn was matched by the Arts Council of Great Britain under the chairmanship of John Maynard Keynes. Bing also co-founded the Festival with Harry Harvey Wood, head of the British Council in Scotland, Sidney Newman, Reid Professor of Music at Edinburgh University, and a group of civic leaders from the City of Edinburgh, in particular Sir John Falconer.

Bing had looked at several English cities before shifting his focus to Scotland and settling on Edinburgh, a city he had visited and admired in 1939. In particular, Edinburgh's castle reminded him of Salzburg where he had been the festival director before the war. Harvey Wood described the meeting at which the idea was hatched:

The Edinburgh International Festival of Music and Drama was first discussed over a lunch table in a restaurant in Hanover Square, London, towards the end of 1944. Rudolf Bing, convinced that musical and operatic festivals on anything like the pre-war scale were unlikely to be held in any of the shattered and impoverished centres for many years to come, was anxious to consider and investigate the possibility of staging such a Festival somewhere in the United Kingdom in the summer of 1946. He was convinced and he convinced my colleagues and myself that such an enterprise, successfully conducted, might at this moment of European time, be of more than temporary significance and might establish in Britain a centre of world resort for lovers of music, drama, opera, ballet and the graphic arts.

Certain preconditions were obviously required of such a centre. It should be a town of reasonable size, capable of absorbing and entertaining anything between 50,000 and 150,000 visitors over a period of three weeks to a month. It should, like Salzburg, have considerable scenic and picturesque appeal and it should be set in a country likely to be attractive to tourists and foreign visitors. It should have sufficient number of theatres, concert halls and open spaces for the adequate staging of a programme of an ambitious and varied character. Above all it should be a city likely to embrace the opportunity and willing to make the festival a major preoccupation not only in the City Chambers but in the heart and home of every citizen, however modest. Greatly daring but not without confidence I recommended Edinburgh as the centre and promised to make preliminary investigations.

Wood approached Falconer, who enthusiastically welcomed the initiative on behalf of the city. As it was too late to finalise arrangements for 1946, plans were made for the following year.

== Features of the festival ==
The first International Festival took place between 22 August and 11 September 1947, and it remained an event straddling August and September until 2015, when the dates of the Edinburgh International Festival was brought forward to begin and end in August. This brought the International Festival back in sync with the Fringe which had shifted dates several years earlier.

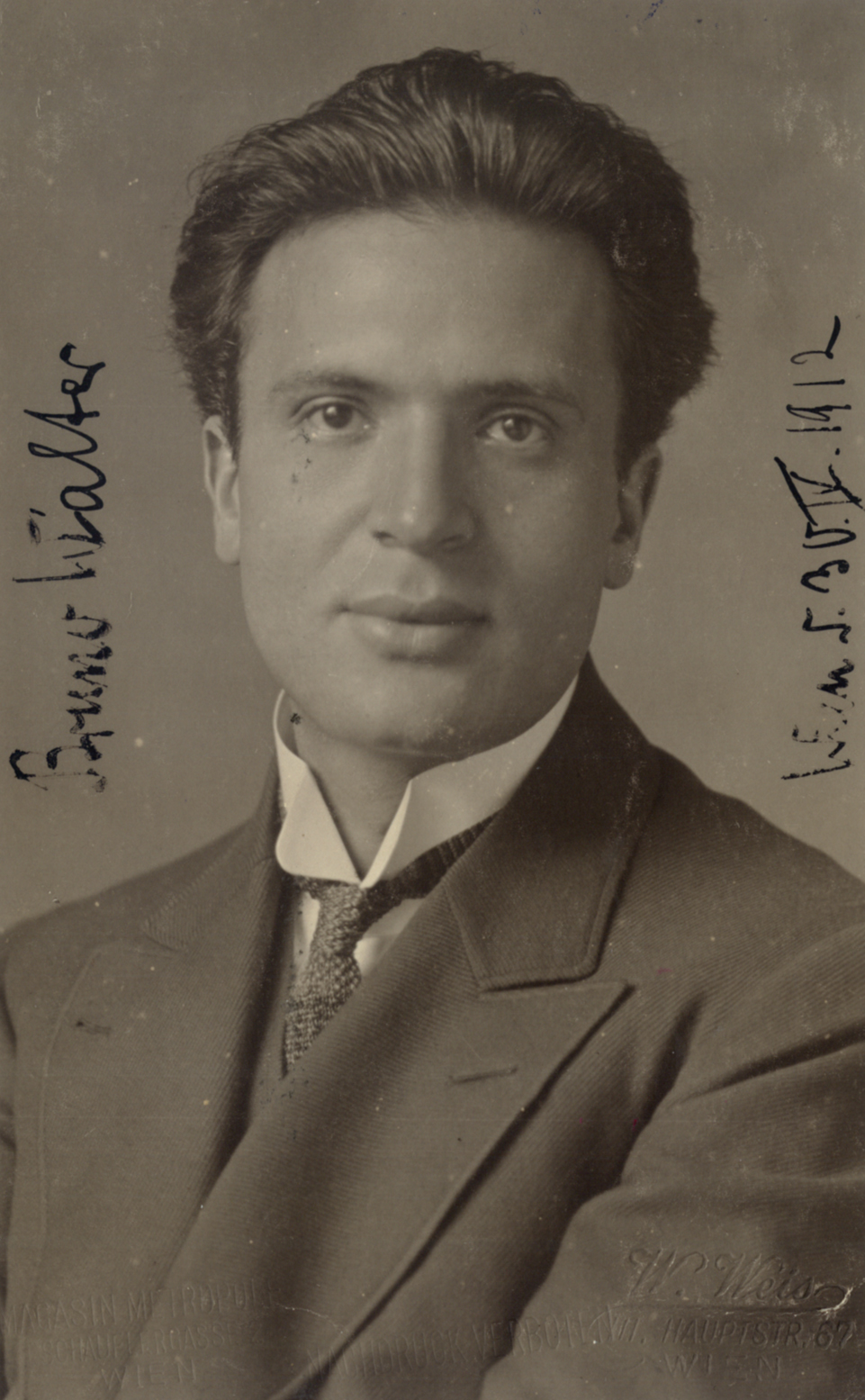
Bruno Walter, who appeared at the festival in 1947, 1949 and 1953

=== Classical music ===
From the beginning, the festival had a broad coverage, but with an emphasis on classical music, a highlight of the first season being concerts given by the Vienna Philharmonic, reunited with their erstwhile conductor Bruno Walter, who had left Europe after Germany's annexation of Austria in 1938.

Many notable musicians appeared at the festival during the late 1940s and early 1950s. Besides Bruno Walter, they included the conductors Wilhelm Furtwängler, John Barbirolli, Thomas Beecham, Adrian Boult, Fritz Busch, Josef Krips, Pierre Monteux and Vittorio Gui, the pianist Artur Schnabel, the violinist Joseph Szigeti, and the singer Lotte Lehmann, all of whom appeared in Edinburgh late their careers.

Rising stars of post-war Europe, such as the conductors Herbert von Karajan, Rafael Kubelík, Charles Munch, Wolfgang Sawallisch, and Leonard Bernstein, the pianists Claudio Arrau, Solomon, and Rudolf Serkin, the string players Yehudi Menuhin, Pierre Fournier, Isaac Stern, and Amadeus String Quartet, and the singers Dietrich Fischer-Dieskau, Victoria de los Ángeles, Boris Christoff, Elisabeth Schwarzkopf, and Peter Pears were all present in Edinburgh concert and recital halls from the beginning of their careers, while the long-lived pianist Arthur Rubinstein had a career that seemingly spanned both eras.

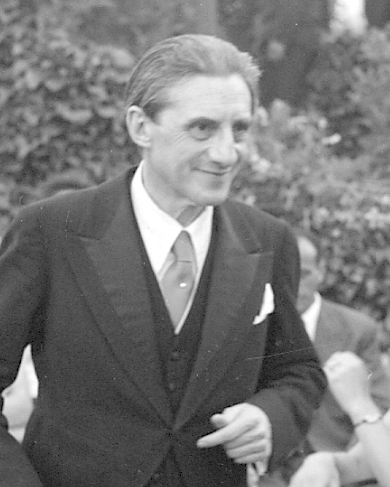
Conductor John Barbirolli appeared at seven festivals between 1947 and 1966.

Some of the most impressive performers of the early years had their careers cut short in the 1950s, notably Kathleen Ferrier, Guido Cantelli, Ginette Neveu and Dennis Brain.

Edinburgh remained at the centre of the musical world during the second decade (1957–1966) of the festival. Leading conductors who performed in the city at that time included Otto Klemperer, Ernest Ansermet, Georg Solti, Carlo Maria Giulini, Yevgeny Mravinsky, István Kertész, Bernard Haitink, George Szell and Leopold Stokowski.

During the third decade (1967-1976) a new group of artists came to Edinburgh, many of whom would dominate music for the rest of the century and into the next. They included conductors like Pierre Boulez, Colin Davis, Claudio Abbado, Kurt Masur, Zubin Mehta, Riccardo Muti, and Daniel Barenboim (who also often appeared as a pianist) and soloists like the pianists Claudio Arrau, Alfred Brendel, Murray Perahia, and Martha Argerich, and the string players Jacqueline du Pré and Itzhak Perlman. In addition an outstanding group of Soviet artists included the pianist Sviatoslav Richter, cellist and conductor Mstislav Rostropovich, violinists David Oistrakh and Leonid Kogan, and the soprano Galina Vishnevskaya.

=== Opera ===
The founders of the Edinburgh Festival had been closely connected with the Glyndebourne Opera and from the beginning opera was an important part of the programme.

The city did not have, and still does not have, ideal facilities for creating original staged opera productions, so guest companies were invited to the festival. In the early years, Glyndebourne fulfilled this role, bringing two productions a year between 1947 and 1951. Hamburg took over in 1952, with no less than six productions. Glyndebourne returned from 1953 to 1955, now with three operas each year, with Hamburg coming again in 1956 with four productions.

During the second decade (1957–1966), Edinburgh received a series of different opera companies, starting with La Scala (Piccola Scala), and continuing with the Stuttgart State Opera, Royal Opera Stockholm, Glyndebourne Opera, Covent Garden Opera, Belgrade Opera, the English Opera Group, Teatro San Carlo, Naples, Budapest Opera and Ballet, National Theatre, Prague, the Holland Festival and the Bavarian State Opera, with an average of four or five productions each year. Also from 1965, an Edinburgh Festival Opera began to offer locally created shows.

During the third decade (1967–1976), Edinburgh Festival Opera were prominent performers, together with the Glasgow-based Scottish Opera. Meanwhile, the tradition of inviting guest companies continued with the German companies Deutsche Oper Berlin, Deutsche Oper am Rhein, Hamburg State Opera, and Frankfurt Municipal Opera, the Italian companies Teatro Comunale, Florence and Teatro Massimo, Palermo, as well as National Theatre, Prague, Hungarian State Opera, and Royal Opera, Stockholm and the English Opera Group.

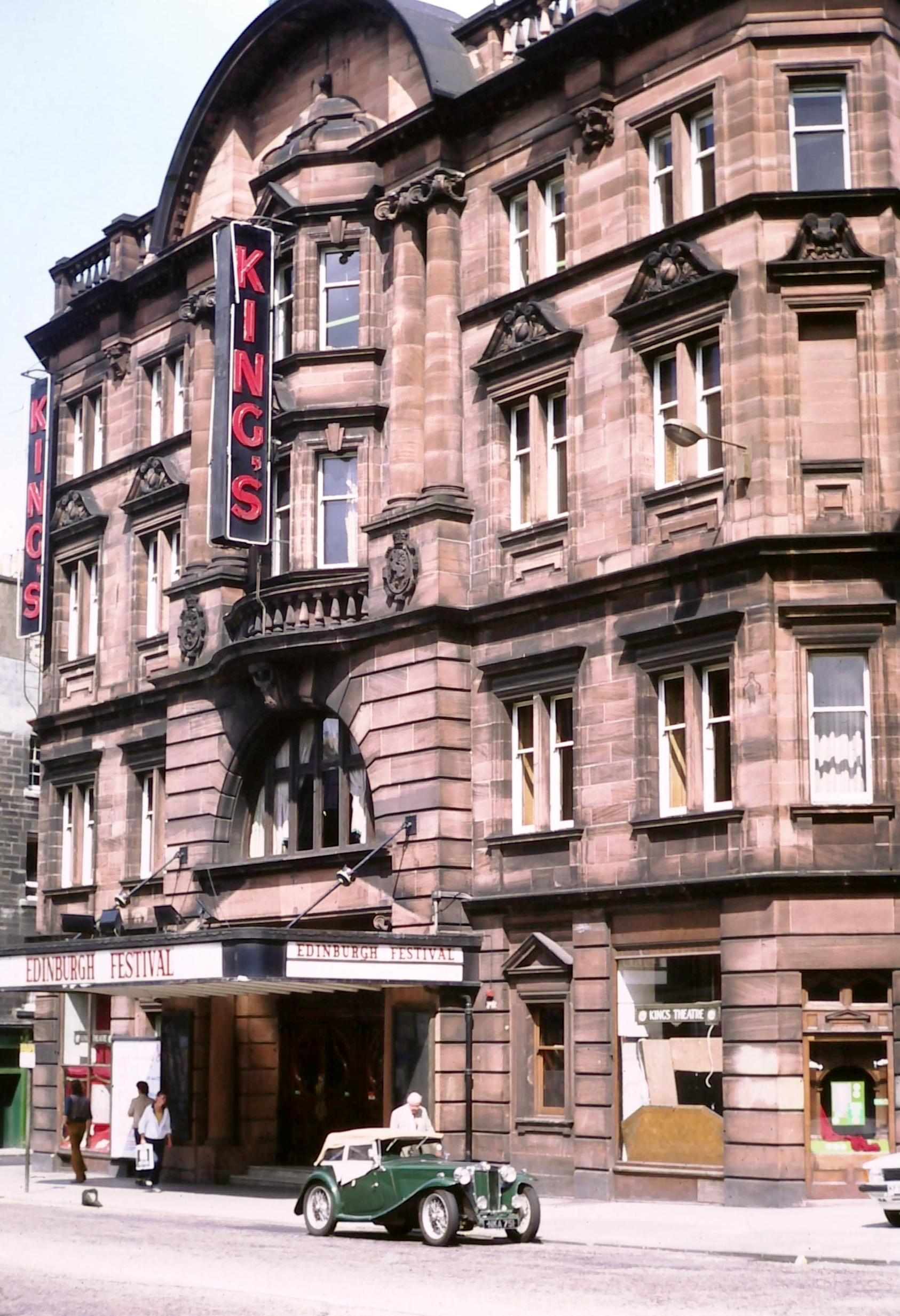
The King's Theatre in 1981. This venue was used for opera in the early years of the festival.

Major artists came to Edinburgh during the first thirty years, such as the conductors Claudio Abbado, Daniel Barenboim, Thomas Beecham, Fritz Busch, Christoph von Dohnányi, Ferenc Fricsay, Alexander Gibson, Carlo Maria Giulini, Vittorio Gui, Rafael Kubelík, Georg Solti, Alberto Erede, János Ferencsik, John Pritchard, and Carlos Kleiber, and the directors Carl Ebert, Peter Ebert, Götz Friedrich, Colin Graham, Jean-Pierre Ponnelle, Günther Rennert, Giorgio Strehler, Luchino Visconti, Wieland Wagner and Franco Zeffirelli.

Star singers appearing in staged operas included Victoria de los Ángeles, Teresa Berganza, Maria Callas, Lisa Della Casa, Ileana Cotrubaș, Sena Jurinac, Birgit Nilsson, Magda Olivero, Renata Scotto, Anja Silja, Elisabeth Söderström, Joan Sutherland, Galina Vishnevskaya, and Ljuba Welitsch, Luigi Alva, Sesto Bruscantini, Boris Christoff, Fernando Corena, Geraint Evans, Dietrich Fischer-Dieskau, Nicolai Gedda, Tito Gobbi, Alfredo Kraus, George London, Luciano Pavarotti, Peter Pears, Hermann Prey, Giuseppe Di Stefano, Wolfgang Windgassen, and Fritz Wunderlich.

=== Ballet ===
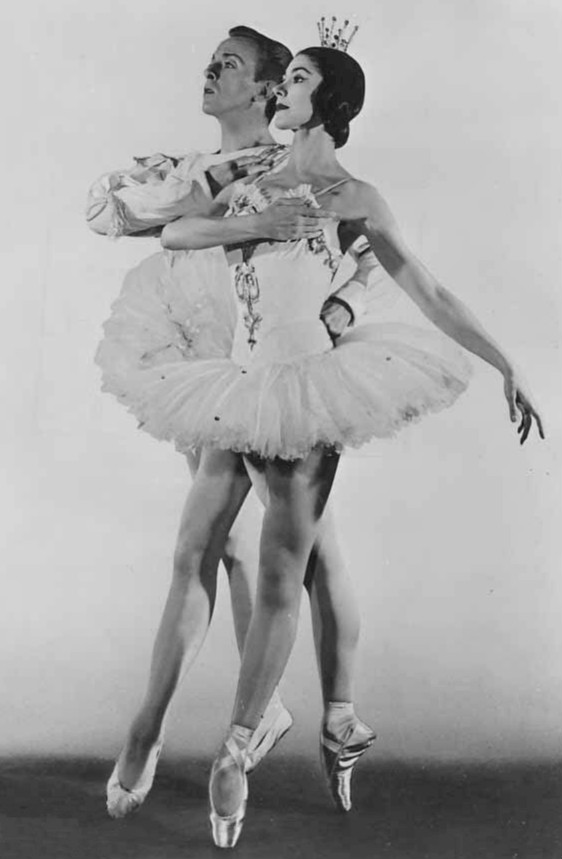
Fonteyn and Helpmann, The Sleeping Beauty, Sadler's Wells 1950

Ballet was inaugurated at the festival with performances of The Sleeping Beauty with Margot Fonteyn, Robert Helpmann and the Sadler's Wells Ballet Company at the Empire Theatre. They returned in subsequent years, together with companies including the Ballets des Champs-Élysées from Paris, American National Ballet Theatre from New York, the Grand Ballet du Marquis de Cuevas (Le Grand Ballet de Monte Carlo), the Spanish Ballet of Pilar López, the Yugoslav Ballet and the Royal Danish Ballet.

=== Drama ===
Drama was an important feature of the Edinburgh International Festival from its inception, and right through the successful early years.

The Old Vic Theatre Company, like Glyndebourne for opera and Sadler's Wells for ballet, gave their strong support to the festival in the beginning, and over the years they were joined by a series of other important British companies such as the Glasgow Citizens' Theatre, The English Stage Company, Royal Shakespeare Company, Traverse Theatre, Prospect Theatre Company, and the National Theatre of Great Britain.

One of the festival's first dramatic success came in 1948 when an adaptation of David Lyndsay's The Thrie Estaites was performed to great acclaim for the first time since 1552 in the Assembly Hall on the Mound. The work was revived in 1948. 1949, 1951, 1959 and 1973.

Companies came from all over the world, and with increasing frequency. In the first decade (1947–1956), from France, Italy and Canada, in the second (1957–1966), from France, Italy, Greece, Russia, and Poland, and in the third (1967–1976), from the USA, Sweden, Ireland, Poland, Bulgaria, East Germany, Italy, Romania, Japan, Belgium, and Switzerland. Notable groups included the Le Comédie Française, Düsseldorf Theatre Company, The Stratford Ontario Festival Company, Abbey Theatre Dublin, Theatre on the Balustrade, Prague, La Mama Company, New York and the Noh and Bunraku companies from Japan.

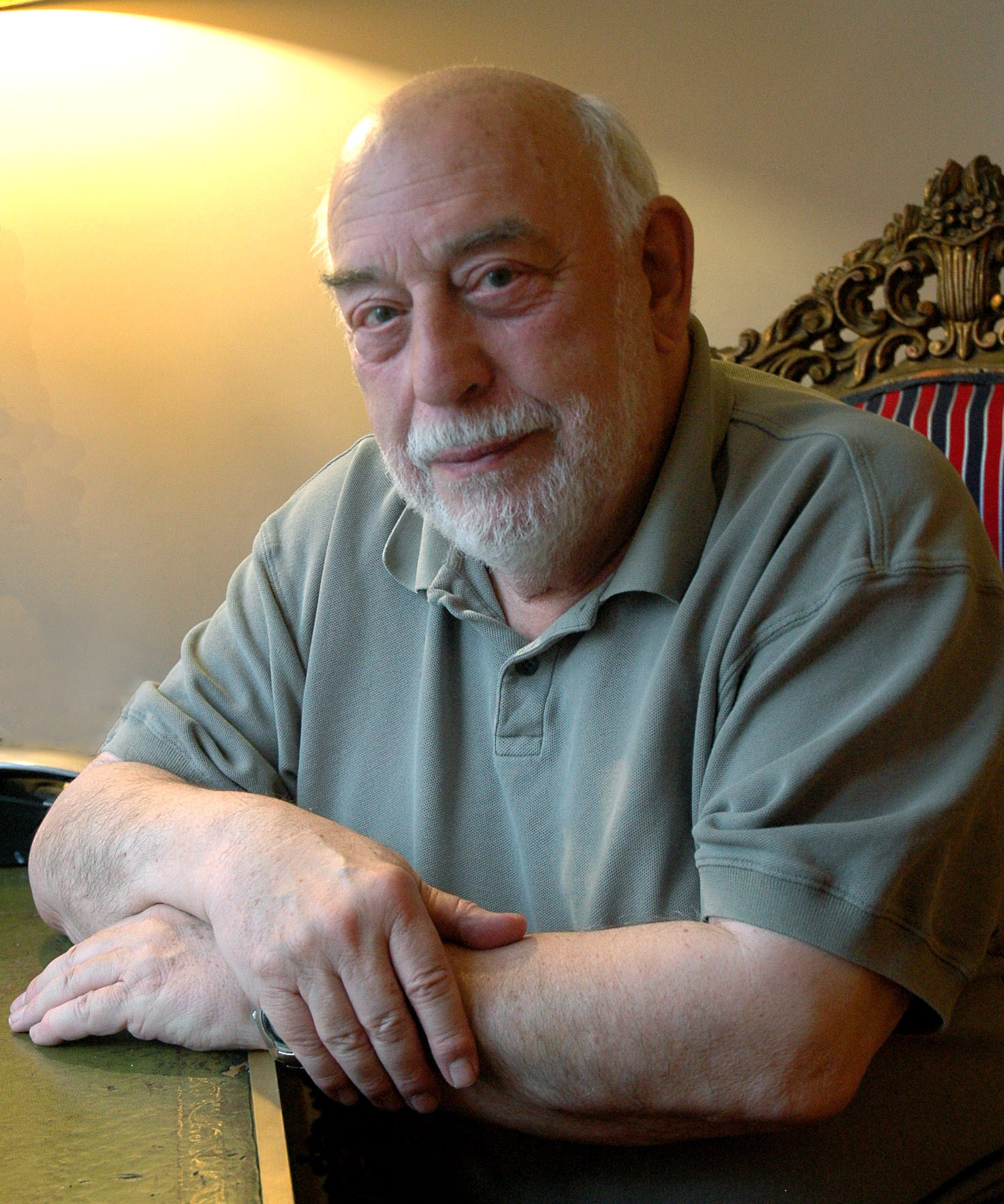
Frank Dunlop, theatre director and also director of the festival itself from 1984 to 1991

Noted directors in the early years included E. Martin Browne, Peter Ustinov, Gustav Gründgens, Tyrone Guthrie and Michael Benthall, while in the 1960s and 1970s Frank Dunlop, Richard Eyre, Toby Robertson, Luca Ronconi, and Andrei Serban brought productions to the city.

Well-known actors included Ralph Richardson, Alec Guinness, John Gielgud, Sybil Thorndike, Lewis Casson, Emlyn Williams, Claire Bloom, Alan Badel, Peter Finch, Richard Burton, Fay Compton, Ann Todd, Eric Porter and Edwige Feuillère in the early period, while Anna Calder-Marshall, Derek Jacobi, Felicity Kendal, Ian McKellen, John Neville, Edward Petherbridge, and Timothy West first appeared in the 1960s and 1970s.

=== Visual arts ===
The visual arts were not featured in the first two festivals in 1947 and 1948, but from 1949 they became an important part of the events. There were major exhibitions at the National Gallery of Scotland and Royal Scottish Academy. These included Rembrandt in 1950, Spanish Paintings (El Greco to Goya) in 1951, Degas in 1952, Renoir in 1953, Cézanne in 1954, Gauguin in 1955, and Braque in 1956.

The second decade of the festival began with Monet in 1957, followed by two exhibitions, Masterpieces of Byzantine Art and the Moltzau Collection (Cézanne to Picasso) featured in 1958, Masterpieces of Czech Art in 1959, German Expressionist Painting in 1960, and an Epstein Memorial Exhibition together with a selection from the Bührle Collection (Zürich) in 1961. Modern Primitive Paintings from Yugoslavia and Matisse and After (from the Sonja Henie – Niels Onstad Collection in Oslo in 1962. Modigliani and Soutine were shown in a double exhibition, together with Music and Dance in Indian Art, in 1963. There was an exhibition of Delacroix in 1964, Corot in 1965, and Rouault in 1966.

The third decade began with Derain in 1967, followed by Charles Rennie Mackintosh, Wotruba, a Boudin to Picasso exhibition at the Royal Scottish Academy, and Canada 101, a focus on contemporary Canadian art, all in 1968. Sixteenth century Italian drawings from British private collections (at Merchants' Hall), Contemporary Polish art, and Jack Coia gold medallist were shown in 1969. For 1970, the exhibitions were Early Celtic art and Contemporary German art from Düsseldorf. The Belgian contribution to surrealism, Sir Walter Scott Bicentenary and Contemporary Romanian art exhibitions were offered in 1971. In 1972 the Scottish painter Alan Davie was featured at the Royal Scottish Academy, followed in 1973 by Permanences e l'Art Francais in the same gallery, as well as Objects USA at the City of Edinburgh Art Gallery, and a Tyrone Guthrie exhibition.

=== World premieres ===
Many works have received their world premieres at the Edinburgh International Festival, from T. S. Eliot's The Cocktail Party and The Confidential Clerk in 1949 and 1953, to James MacMillan's 2018 version of Quickening and Symphony No. 5, both in 2019.

== Festival venues ==
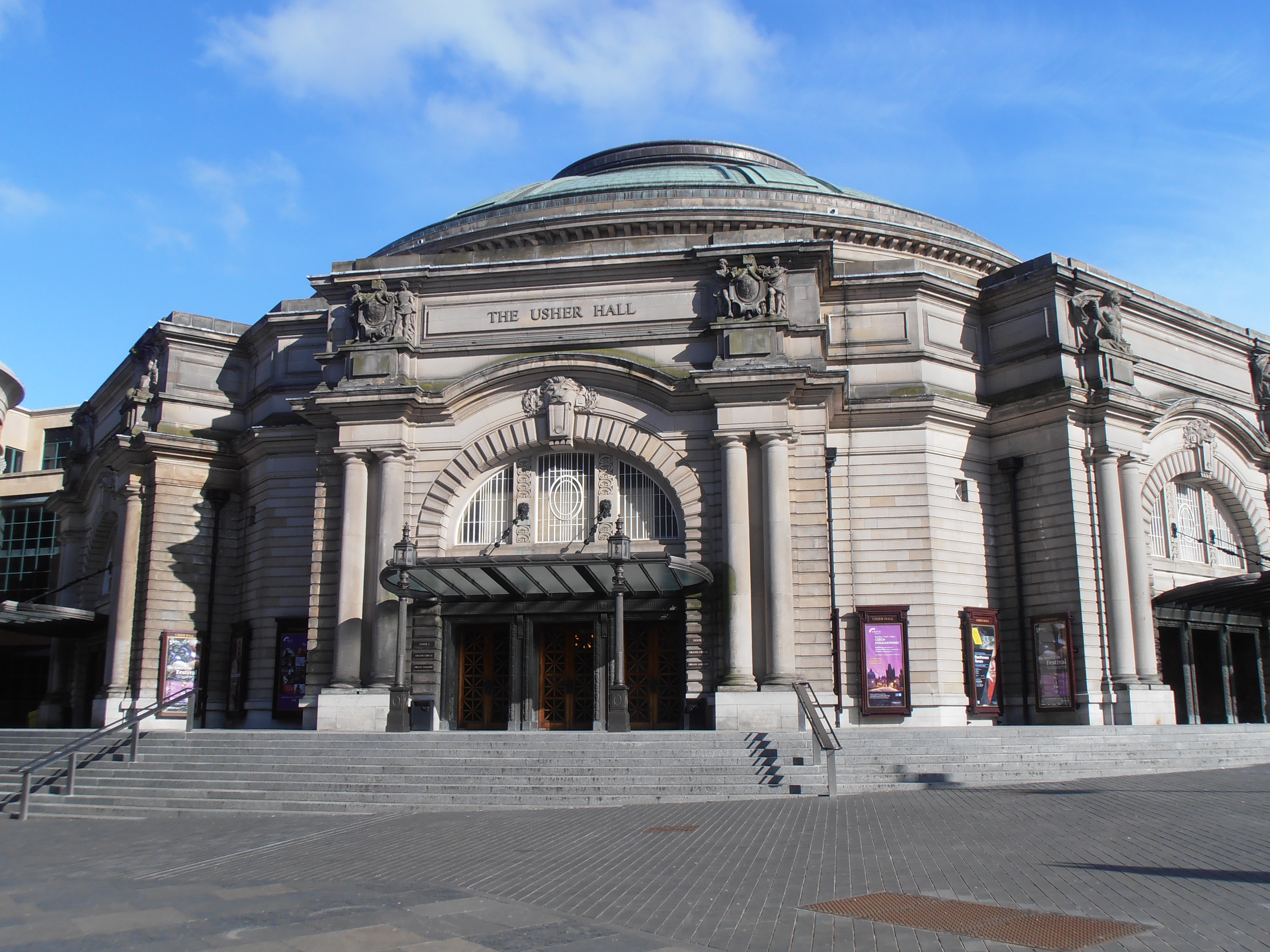
Usher Hall, the leading venue of the Edinburgh International Festival

The principal venues of the Festival are:

- Usher Hall (capacity approximately 2,200), concert hall, built in 1914, used by the festival since 1947.
- Kings Theatre (1,300), opened in 1906, used by the festival since 1947, notably for theatre and opera. The theatre closed for renovation in 2022 and reopened in 2026.
- Royal Lyceum Theatre (658), opened in 1883, used by the festival since 1947, mainly for drama.
- Edinburgh Playhouse (3,059), opened in 1929, Britain's largest theatre, formerly a cinema.
- Festival Theatre (1,915), dating back to 1892, originally a variety, musical and opera house called the Empire Theatre. Used by the festival since 1947, at first for ballet. Remodelled in 1994 and now used for festival opera and ballet.
- The Queen's Hall (920), converted chapel, opened as a concert hall in 1979, performance home of the Scottish Chamber Orchestra.
- The Hub (420), originally built as the Tollbooth Church (1842–44) to house the General Assembly of the Church of Scotland. This is on Castlehill, directly below Edinburgh Castle, with its tall Gothic spire, the highest point in central Edinburgh (outside of the Castle). Used since 1999 as the central box office, information centre, and offices for the Edinburgh International Festival team, as well as a separate venue.
- The Dunard Centre (1000), a new concert hall, under construction as of 2026, with completion expected in 2029.

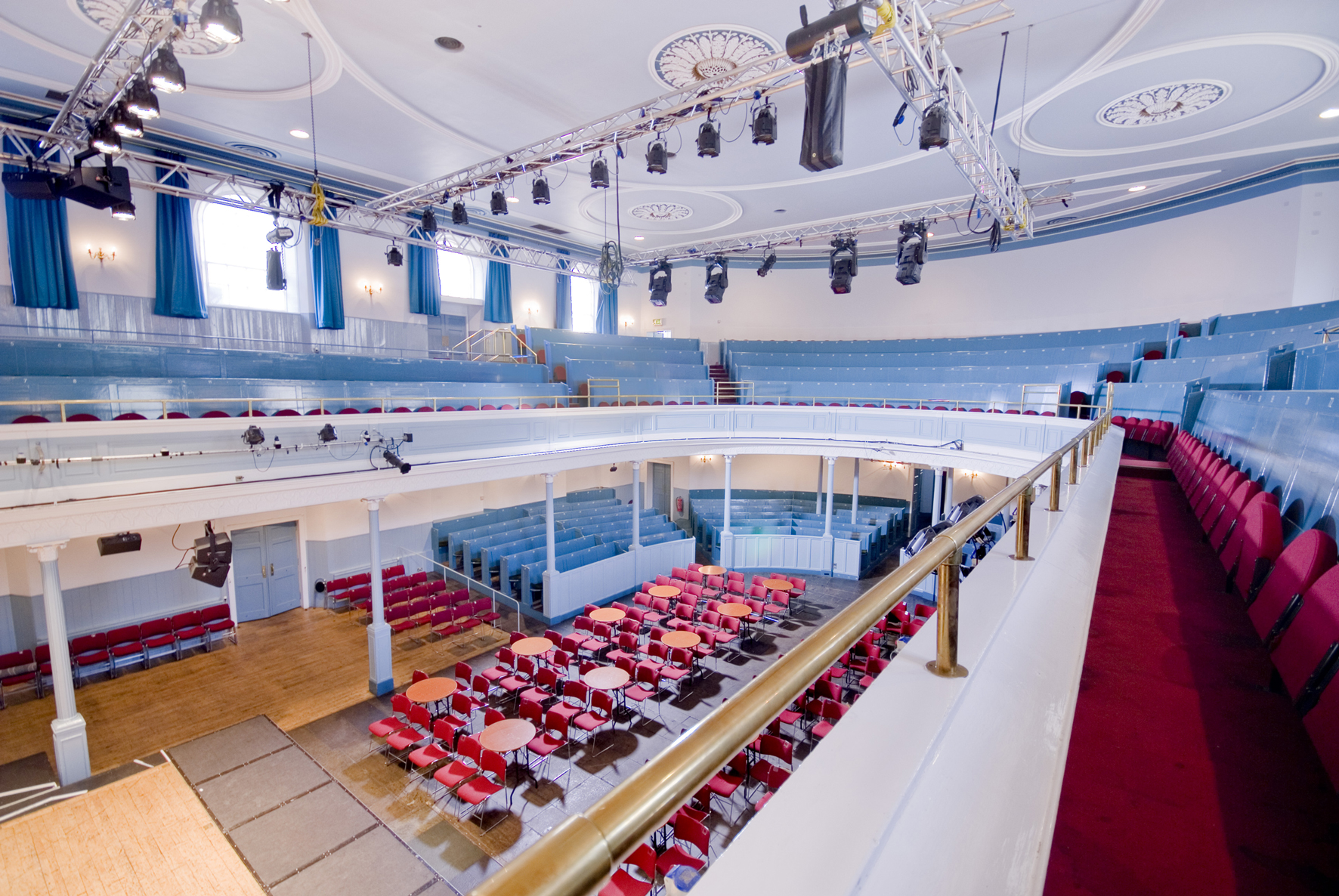
Interior of the Queen's Hall, performance home of the Scottish Chamber Orchestra

Other venues that have sometimes been used in the past include:

- Church Hill Theatre (353), built in 1892 as North Morningside Free Church and bought by the City of Edinburgh Council in 1960.
- Freemasons' Hall (approximately 500) at 96 George Street, opened in 1912, used by the festival from 1947 for recitals and chamber concerts.
- Gateway Theatre, built in 1882 as a veterinary college, used for drama performances during the festival, but eventually converted to student housing.
- General Assembly Hall of the Church of Scotland, used for drama performances from 1949
- Leith Theatre (also known as Leith Town Hall and, briefly, Citadel Theatre), used as a medium-sized concert and recital hall by the festival from 1961 to the end of the 1970s. It closed completely in 1988, and is now being once again restored.
- St Cecilia's Hall (180), a historic concert hall in the Cowgate, which dates back to 1763.

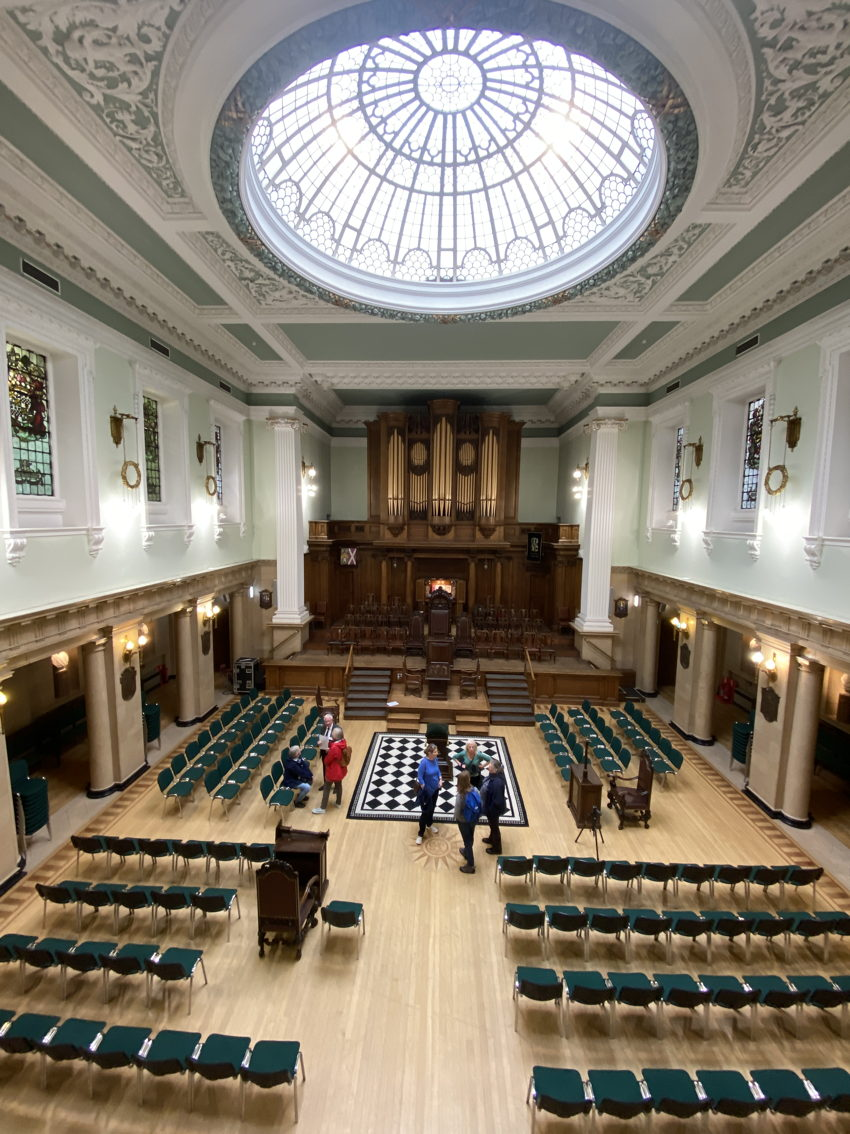
Freemasons' Hall was frequently used for musical concerts and recitals from 1947 until the early 1970s.

== Other festivals in Edinburgh ==
About ten other festivals are held in Edinburgh at about the same time as the International Festival. Collectively, the entire group is referred to as the Edinburgh Festival or Edinburgh Festivals.

Most notable is the Edinburgh Festival Fringe, which started as an offshoot of the International Festival in the first year of its operation (although not known as such at the beginning), and has since grown to be the world's largest arts and media festival.

The Edinburgh International Film Festival also began in August 1947 with a programme of documentary films. In the 1990s this festival moved into June. The 1966 Writers' Festival begun by John Calder, Richard Demarco, Jim Haynes, founders of the Paperback Bookshop and Traverse Theatre, eventually led to the Edinburgh International Book Festival also staged in August.

The British Army's desire to showcase itself during the festival period led to the independent staging of the first Edinburgh Military Tattoo, featuring displays of piping and dancing, in 1950. This annual event has come to be regarded as a part of the official festival, though it continues to be organised separately.

The result is a collection of festivals with more than 2,500 performances and events every day in Edinburgh in August, which is said to be many times larger than any similar conglomeration of arts and media festivals anywhere in the world.

== See also ==
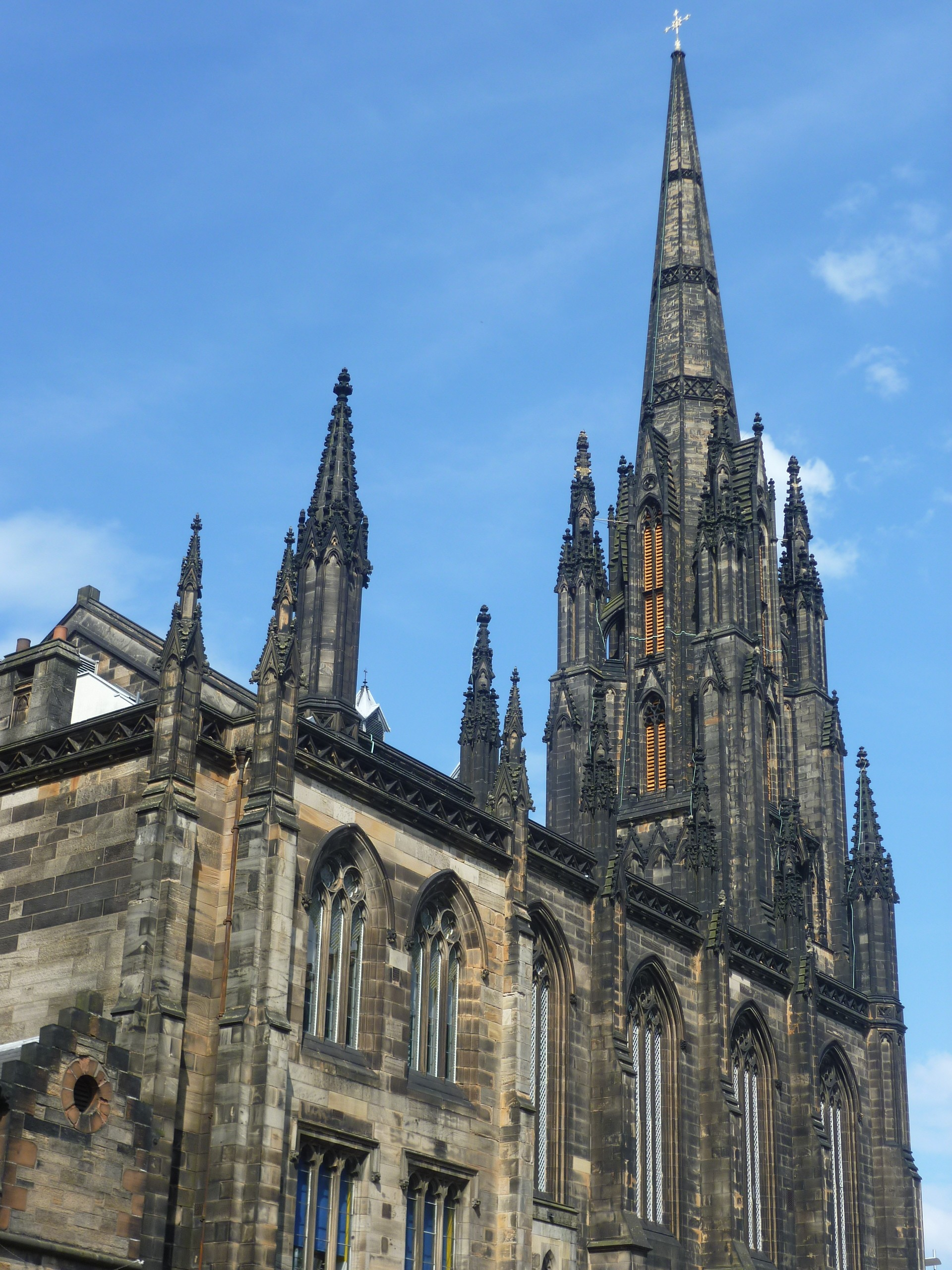
The 240-foot-high spire of The Hub, ticket office, information centre and performance venue of the Edinburgh International Festival, seen from Johnston Terrace

- List of Edinburgh festivals
- List of opera festivals
- Edinburgh Festival Fringe 1947
