= World premieres at the Edinburgh International Festival =

The following works received their World premieres at the Edinburgh International Festival:

== List ==
Date of premiere	Work	Genre	Creator/composer	Presented/performed by
22 August 1949	The Cocktail Party	Drama	T. S. Eliot	Sherek Players
29 August 1949	The Man in the Raincoat	Drama	Peter Ustinov	Sherek Players
21 August 1950	The Queen's Comedy	Drama	James Bridie	Glasgow Citizens Theatre
24 August 1950	The Atom Doctor	Drama	Eric Linklater	Glasgow Citizens Theatre
19 August 1951	Symphony No. 2	Symphony	William Wordsworth	London Philharmonic Orchestra
25 August 1953	The Confidential Clerk	Drama	T. S. Eliot	Sherek Players
26 August 1954	Practical Cats	Entertainment for children	Alan Rawsthorne	BBC Scottish Orchestra
3 September 1954	Symphony No. 4	Symphony	William Wordsworth	The Hallé Orchestra
20 August 1957	The Hidden King	Drama	Jonathan Griffin	Stephen Mitchell
25 August 1958	The Elder Statesman	Drama	T. S. Eliot	Henry Sherek
24 August 1959	Breakspear in Gascony	Drama	Eric Linklater	The Perth Theatre Company
22 August 1960	The Wallace	Drama	Sydney Goodsir Smith	
2 September 1960	Symphony No. 2	Symphony	William Walton	Royal Liverpool Philharmonic Orchestra
3 September 1960	Symphony No. 3	Symphony	Humphrey Searle	Royal Liverpool Philharmonic Orchestra
5 September 1960	The Dream of Peter Mann	Drama	Bernard Kops	Lynoq Productions
4 September 1961	August for the People	Drama	Nigel Dennis	The English Stage Company
4 September 1962	Curtmantle	Drama	Christopher Fry	Royal Shakespeare Company
28 August 2003	There Where She Loved Rush	Ballet	Christopher Wheeldon	San Francisco Ballet
13 August 2010	Caledonia	Musical	Alistair Beaton	National Theatre of Scotland
2 September 2010	Quimeras	Flamenco	Paco Peña	Paco Peña Flamenco Dance Company
26 August 2011	Kings 2 Ends	Ballet	Jorma Elo	Scottish Ballet
17 August 2012	Gulliver's Travels	Drama	Silviu Purcărete after Jonathan Swift	Radu Stanca National Theatre
22 August 2012	Since it was the day of Preparation...	Choral	Sir James MacMillan	William Conway, Brindley Sherratt, Hebrides Ensemble, Synergy Vocals
29 August 2012	The Lady from the Sea	Opera	Craig Armstrong and Zoë Strachan, based on a play by Henrik Ibsen	Scottish Opera
30 August 2012	In the Locked Room	Opera	Huw Watkins, David Harsent	Scottish Opera
30 August 2012	Ghost Patrol	Opera	Stuart MacRae, Louise Welsh	Scottish Opera
10 August 2013	Metamorphosis	Drama	Wu Hsing-kuo, based on the novel by Franz Kafka	Contemporary Legend Theatre
10 August 2013	Leaving Planet Earth	Immersive theatre	Catrin Evans, Lewis Hetherington	Grid Iron
16 August 2013	Still it Remains (New Voices)	Dance	James Cousins	Scottish Ballet, Scottish Dance Theatre
16 August 2013	The Room (New Voices)	Dance	Helen Pickett	Scottish Ballet, Scottish Dance Theatre
16 August 2013	In This Storm (New Voices)	Dance	Henri Oguike	Scottish Ballet, Scottish Dance Theatre
16 August 2013	Dark Full Ride (New Voices)	Dance	Martin Lawrence	Scottish Ballet, Scottish Dance Theatre
16 August 2013	Foibles (New Voices)	Dance	Kristen McNally	Scottish Ballet, Scottish Dance Theatre
27 August 2013	Festival City	Orchestral and electronics	Tod Machover	Royal Scottish National Orchestra, Peter Oundjian
10 August 2014	James I: The Key Will Keep The Lock	Drama	Rona Munro	National Theatre of Scotland, National Theatre of Great Britain
10 August 2014	James II: Day of the Innocents	Drama	Rona Munro	National Theatre of Scotland, National Theatre of Great Britain
10 August 2014	James III: The True Mirror	Drama	Rona Munro	National Theatre of Scotland, National Theatre of Great Britain
10 August 2014	Inala	Dance	Mark Baldwin, Joseph Shabalala, Ladysmith Black Mambazo, Ella Spira	Rambert Dance Company, The Royal Ballet
26 August 2014	Relict Furies for mezzo soprano and double string orchestra	Chamber music	Gareth Farr	Sarah Connolly, Scottish Ensemble, Commonwealth Strings
27 August 2014	Patrias	Flamenco music	Paco Peña	Paco Peña
26 August 2015	Nonet for two string quartets and contrabass	Chamber music	André Previn	Anne-Sophie Mutter, The Mutter Virtuosi
4 August 2016	Wind Resistance	Music, storytelling	Karine Polwart	Karine Polwart
12 August 2016	Hommage à Kurtág	Chamber music	Mark Simpson	Mark Simpson, Antoine Tamestit, Pierre-Laurent Aimard
16 August 2016	Anything That Gives Off Light	Musical	Jessica Almasy, Davey Anderson, Rachel Chavkin, Brian Ferguson, Sandy Grierson	The TEAM, National Theatre of Scotland
27 August 2016	Swans Kissing	Chamber music	Rolf Wallin	Danish String Quartet
4 August 2017	Meet Me at Dawn	Drama	Zinnie Harris	Traverse Theatre Company
4 August 2017	Flight	Drama	Oliver Emanuel based on the novel Hinterland by Caroline Brothers	Vox Motus
8 August 2017	The Divide Parts 1 & 2	Drama	Alan Ayckbourn	The Old Vic
17 August 2018	Correspondences	Chamber music	Peder Barratt-Due	Eivind Ringstad, David Meier
3 August 2019	The Crucible	Ballet	Helen Pickett, Peter Salem	Scottish Ballet
7 August 2019	Total Immediate Collective Imminent Terrestrial Salvation	Drama	Tim Crouch	National Theatre of Scotland
10 August 2019	Quickening (2018 version)	Cantata	Sir James MacMillan	The King's Singers, Royal Scottish National Orchestra, Edinburgh Festival Chorus, RSNO Junior Chorus, Ed Gardner
14 August 2019	Red Dust Road	Drama	Tanika Gupta based on the book by Jackie Kay	National Theatre of Scotland, HOME
17 August 2019	Symphony No. 5 Le grand Inconnu	Symphony	Sir James MacMillan	Scottish Chamber Orchestra, The Sixteen, Genesis Sixteen, Harry Christophers
7 August 2021	Medicine	Drama	Enda Walsh	Landmark Productions
7 August 2021	PIVOT	Orchestral	Anna Clyne	BBC Symphony Orchestra, Dalia Stasevska
17 August 2021	Blush	Orchestral	Ayanna Witter-Johnson	Chineke! Orchestra, William Eddins
6 August 2022	Burn	Dance-Theatre	Alan Cumming, Steven Hoggett	Alan Cumming, National Theatre of Scotland
14 August 2022	Coppélia	Ballet	Morgann Runacre-Temple, Jessica Wright	Scottish Ballet
16 August 2022	A Wee Journey	Dance, music	Farah Saleh, Oğuz Kaplangı	Farah Saleh, Oğuz Kaplangı
18 August 2022	Muster Station: Leith	Immersive Theatre	Nicola McCartney, Tawona Sitholé, Uma Nada-Rajah, Ben Harrison	Grid Iron
18 August 2022	Sun Poem	Orchestral	Daniel Kidane	London Symphony Orchestra, Sir Simon Rattle
23 August 2022	For Zoe	Orchestral	Sir James MacMillan	Royal Scottish National Orchestra, Thomas Søndergård

== See also ==
- Edinburgh International Festival
- Opera at the Edinburgh International Festival: history and repertoire, 1947–1956
- Opera at the Edinburgh International Festival: history and repertoire, 1957–1966
- Opera at the Edinburgh International Festival: history and repertoire, 1967–1976
- Ballet at the Edinburgh International Festival: history and repertoire, 1947–1956
- Ballet at the Edinburgh International Festival: history and repertoire, 1957–1966
- Ballet at the Edinburgh International Festival: history and repertoire, 1967–1976
- Drama at the Edinburgh International Festival: history and repertoire, 1947–1956
- Drama at the Edinburgh International Festival: history and repertoire, 1957–1966
- Drama at the Edinburgh International Festival: history and repertoire, 1967–1976
- Musicians at the Edinburgh International Festival, 1947–1956
- Musicians at the Edinburgh International Festival, 1957–1966
- Musicians at the Edinburgh International Festival, 1967–1976
- Visual Arts at the Edinburgh International Festival, 1947–1976
