= Murder in the Cathedral =

Play by T. S. Eliot

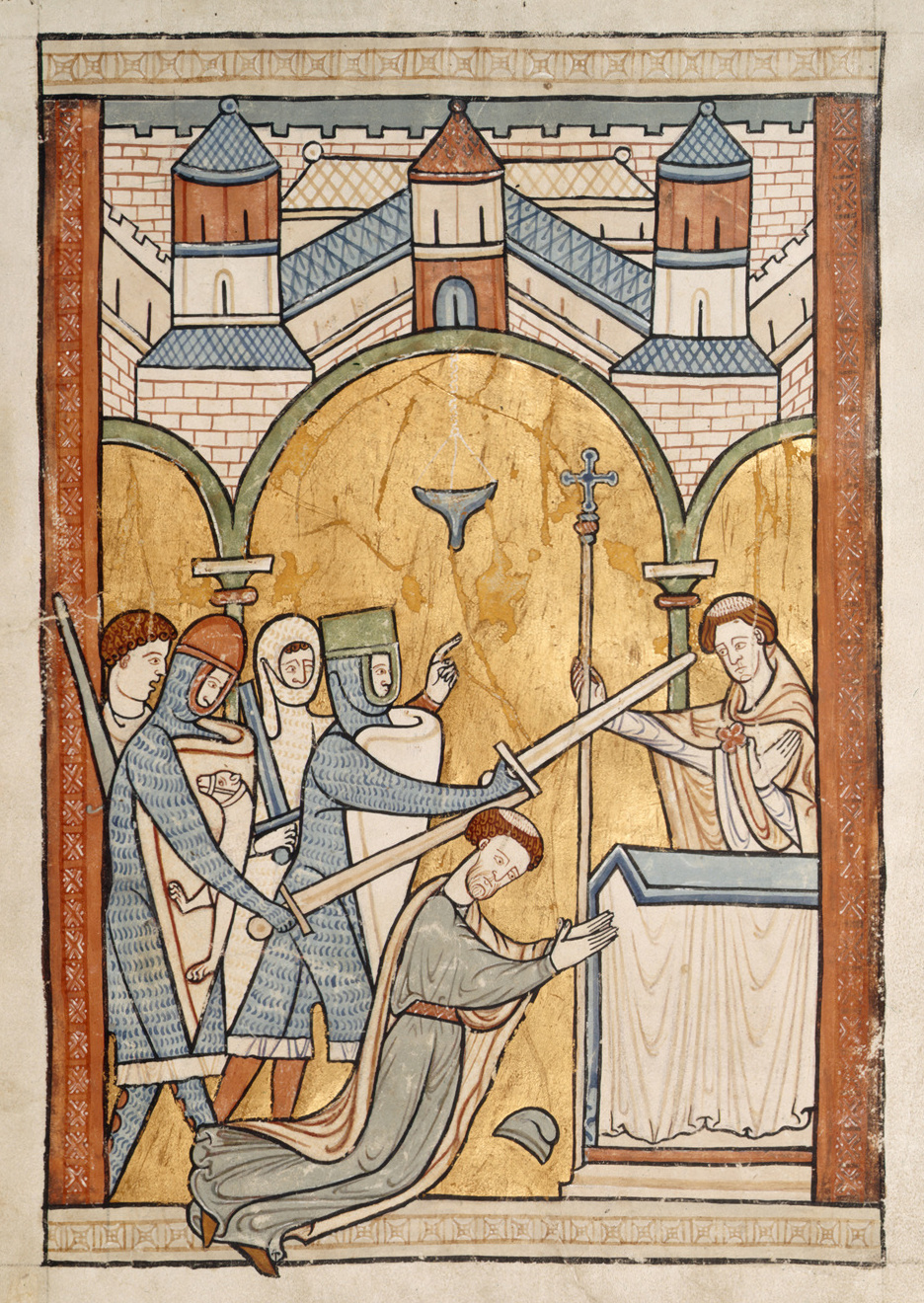
Thirteenth-century manuscript illumination depicting Becket's assassination

Murder in the Cathedral is a verse drama by T. S. Eliot, first performed in 1935 (published the same year). The play portrays the assassination of Archbishop Thomas Becket in Canterbury Cathedral during the reign of Henry II in 1170. Eliot drew heavily on the writing of Edward Grim, a clerk who was an eyewitness to the event.

Some material that the producer asked Eliot to remove or replace during the writing was transformed into the poem "Burnt Norton".

== Plot ==
The action occurs between 2 and 29 December 1170, chronicling the days leading up to the martyrdom of Thomas Becket following his absence of seven years in France. Becket's internal struggle is a central focus of the play.

The book is divided into two parts. Part one takes place in the Archbishop Thomas Becket's hall on 2 December 1170. The play begins with a Chorus singing, foreshadowing the coming violence. The Chorus is a key part of the drama, with its voice changing and developing during the play, offering comments about the action and providing a link between the audience and the characters and action, as in Greek drama. Three priests are present, and they reflect on the absence of Becket and the rise of temporal power. A herald announces Becket's arrival. Becket is immediately reflective about his coming martyrdom, which he embraces, and which is understood to be a sign of his own selfishness—his fatal weakness. The tempters arrive, three of whom parallel the Temptations of Christ.

The first tempter offers the prospect of physical safety.

Take a friend's advice. Leave well alone,
Or your goose may be cooked and eaten to the bone.

The second offers power, riches, and fame in serving the King.

To set down the great, protect the poor,
Beneath the throne of God can man do more?

The third tempter suggests a coalition with the barons and a chance to resist the King.

For us, Church favour would be an advantage,
Blessing of Pope powerful protection
In the fight for liberty. You, my Lord,
In being with us, would fight a good stroke

Finally, a fourth tempter urges him to seek the glory of martyrdom.

You hold the keys of heaven and hell.
Power to bind and loose: bind, Thomas, bind,
King and bishop under your heel.
King, emperor, bishop, baron, king:

Becket responds to all of the tempters and specifically addresses the immoral suggestions of the fourth tempter at the end of the first act:

Now is my way clear, now is the meaning plain:
Temptation shall not come in this kind again.
The last temptation is the greatest treason:
To do the right deed for the wrong reason.

The Interlude of the play is a sermon given by Becket on Christmas morning 1170. It is about the strange contradiction that Christmas is a day both of mourning and rejoicing, which Christians also do for martyrs. He announces at the end of his sermon, "it is possible that in a short time you may have yet another martyr". We see in the sermon something of Becket's ultimate peace of mind, as he elects not to seek sainthood, but to accept his death as inevitable and part of a better whole.

Part II of the play takes place in the Archbishop's Hall and in the cathedral, 29 December 1170. Four knights arrive with "Urgent business" from the king. These knights had heard the king speak of his frustration with Becket and had interpreted this as an order to kill Becket. They accuse him of betrayal, and he claims to be loyal. He tells them to accuse him in public, and they make to attack him, but priests intervene. The priests insist that he leave and protect himself, but he refuses. The knights leave and Becket again says he is ready to die. The chorus sings that they knew this conflict was coming, that it had long been in the fabric of their lives, both temporal and spiritual. The chorus again reflects on the coming devastation. Thomas is taken to the cathedral, where the knights break in and kill him. The chorus laments: "Clear the air! Clean the sky!", and "The land is foul, the water is foul, our beasts and ourselves defiled with blood."

At the close of the play, the knights address the audience to defend their actions. While the rest of the play is in verse, their speeches of justification are in strikingly contemporary prose. They assert that while they understand their actions will be seen as murder, it was necessary and justified, so that the power of the church should not undermine the stability of the state.

== Performances ==
Movie poster for Murder in the Cathedral

=== First performance ===
George Bell, the Bishop of Chichester, was instrumental in getting Eliot to work as writer with producer E. Martin Browne in producing the pageant play The Rock (1934). Bell then asked Eliot to write another play for the Canterbury Festival in 1935. Eliot agreed to do so if Browne once again produced (he did). The first performance of Murder in the Cathedral was given on 15 June 1935 in the Chapter House of Canterbury Cathedral. Robert Speaight played the part of Becket. The production then moved to the Mercury Theatre, Notting Hill Gate in London and ran there for several months. In 1947 it was performed by Pilgrim Players at the Gateway Theatre, Leith Walk in the first Edinburgh Festival Fringe. A significant performance of the play was held on 15 February 2018. Nithin Varghese, an assistant professor at St Berchmans College in Changanassery, directed the play for the first time in Kerala. This performance was part of the golden jubilee celebration of the postgraduate program in English at the college. The play was staged on the outdoor stage located in front of the Arts Block, and received positive recognition from the audience for its adherence to T. S. Eliot's original text.

=== Television and film ===
The play, starring Robert Speaight, was broadcast live on British television by the BBC in 1936, during its first few months of broadcasting TV.

The play was later made into a black and white film with the same title. It was directed by the Austrian director George Hoellering with music by the Hungarian composer Laszlo Lajtha and won the Grand Prix at the Venice Film Festival in 1951. It was released in the UK in 1952. In the film the fourth tempter is not seen. His voice was that of Eliot himself. Hoellering wrote that "in stage productions [the knights' final] speeches amused the audience instead of shocking them, and thereby made them miss the point—the whole point of the play." In light of this, he asked Eliot for changes; and Eliot made major reductions to the speeches and added a shorter speech.

It was filmed by the ABC in 1962.

=== Opera ===
The play is the basis for the opera Assassinio nella cattedrale by the Italian composer Ildebrando Pizzetti, first performed at La Scala, Milan, in 1958.

=== Recordings ===
Full-cast recordings of the play include the following, with the actor playing Becket.

- 1938 Reynolds Evans by Columbia Workshop (abridged for radio)
- 1953 Robert Donat by Angel Records
- 1968 Paul Scofield by Caedmon Records
- 1976 Richard Pasco of The Royal Shakespeare Company by Argo Records
- 1988 Peter Barkworth by BBC Radio 4 broadcast

== Criticism by Eliot ==
In 1951, in the first Theodore Spencer Memorial Lecture at Harvard University, Eliot criticised his own plays in the second half of the lecture, explicitly the plays Murder in the Cathedral, The Family Reunion, and The Cocktail Party. The lecture was published as Poetry and Drama and later included in Eliot's 1957 collection On Poetry and Poets.

== Parodies ==
In Series 3, episode 2 (1972), Monty Python's Flying Circus used the play as the basis for the weight loss product informercial, Trim-Jeans Theater:

Priest: I am here. No traitor to the King.

First Knight: Absolve all those you have excommunicated.

Second Knight: Resign those powers you have arrogated.

Third Knight: Renew the obedience you have violated.

Fourth Knight: Lose inches off your hips, thighs, buttocks and abdomen.

In 1982, the play was lampooned by the Canadian/US TV comedy show SCTV. In a typically surreal SCTV sketch, the play is presented by NASA and "Buzz Aldrin's Mercury III Players," with space-suited astronauts as the actors, and proceedings narrated by Walter Cronkite as if they were a NASA Moon mission. "[Spacesuit transmission from astronaut] Mission control ... I think we've found a body." The mission is aborted when the doors of the cathedral will not open, and not even Becket's Extra-vehicular activity can open them.
