= Primavera Productions =

Primavera Productions is a professional theatre company founded in 2003 by Tom Littler, who is also the Artistic Director. It is based in London, UK.

Primavera is particularly noted for its revivals of rarely performed plays, although this does not seem to be its exclusive focus. This has included the "Forgotten Classics" series of rehearsed readings at The King's Head Theatre, Islington. These have featured a performance of Byron's Manfred starring young British actor Harry Lloyd, of Virginia Woolf's Freshwater starring Edmund Kingsley, John Lyly's Gallathea starring Mary Nighy, and Charles Dickens's No Thoroughfare starring Louise Brealey, all directed by Tom Littler. Other plays in the series not directed by Tom Littler included the first play in English by a woman (Mariam) and early works by American playwrights. In 2008 Primavera Productions announced a second "Forgotten Classics" series, including the 50th anniversary reading of T.S. Eliot's The Elder Statesman, starring Christopher Timothy, Harry Lloyd, Joanna Christie, and David Burt; an unperformed play by John Osborne, "A Place Calling Itself Rome", which rewrites Shakespeare's Coriolanus; and Wilkie Collins's The Woman in White.

Primavera Productions also produced at the Finborough Theatre where its 2007 work includes an opera by Ethel Smyth and a play by T. S. Eliot, The Confidential Clerk. In 2008, Tom Littler directed the first ever revival of Jingo: A Farce of War, a comedy by Charles Wood set in the last days of British occupation of Singapore before the humiliating surrender to the Japanese. Susannah Harker played Gwendoline and Anthony Howell played her ex-husband Ian. The revival was hailed as a rediscovery of a major playwright. Primavera's past productions have also included the Scottish premiere of Stephen Sondheim's Passion at the 2006 Edinburgh Festival (Scotsman Critics' Choice for Musicals / Opera), Into the Woods and A Streetcar Named Desire at the Oxford Playhouse, a production of Frank McGuinness' version of Ibsen's A Doll's House on tour, and Shakespeare's As You Like It as the inaugural production at the Said Business School in Oxford. All of these productions were directed by Tom Littler.

In 2009, Primavera Productions produced the first revival of Stephen Sondheim's first musical Saturday Night at the Jermyn Street Theatre. The show sold out for its run and successfully transferred to the Arts Theatre in the West End and to Theatre Royal, Windsor. Primavera also produced Bryony Lavery's play Origin of the Species later that year at the Arcola Theatre.
