= William Woodward-Fisher =

British rower

Personal information
- Nationality: British
- Born: March 1956 (age 69) Bromley

Sport
- Sport: Rowing

William Richard Woodward-Fisher (born 1956) is a British property developer and former rower who competed for Great Britain.

== Rowing career ==
Woodward-Fisher was part of the eight that reached the final, and finished 5th, at the 1977 World Rowing Championships in Amsterdam.

== Property career ==
The £32 million sale of Horbury Villa at no. 85 Ladbroke Road, London in 2019 by Woodward-Fisher to the daughter of Georgian billionaire Badri Patarkatsishvili went to the High Court and the judge ruled in 2025 that the new owners were due a full refund due to an undeclared moth infestation.

Woodward-Fisher also owns property in Wargrave, Berkshire, which has been the subject of multiple planning applications.
