= The Confidential Clerk =

Comic verse play by T. S. Eliot

First edition cover (Faber and Faber)

The Confidential Clerk is a comic verse play by T. S. Eliot performed in 1953.

== Synopsis ==
Sir Claude Mulhammer, a wealthy entrepreneur, decides to smuggle his illegitimate son Colby into the household by employing him as his confidential clerk. He hopes that his eccentric wife, Lady Elizabeth Mulhammer, will take a liking to the boy and allow him to live as her adopted son. She in fact becomes convinced that Colby is actually her own son. Meanwhile, Lucasta Angel wants to marry B. Kaghan, but neither seems to have any parents at all. A drama of mistaken identity and confusion ensues. The "confidential clerk" of the title refers both to Colby, in his new job, and Eggerson, Sir Claude's old clerk who is seen retiring at the start of the play but returns in the final act to resolve the situation.

== Characters and original cast ==
	London	New York
Sir Claude Mulhammer	Paul Rogers	Claude Rains
Eggerson	Alan Webb	Newton Blick
Colby Simpkins	Denholm Elliott	Douglass Watson
B. Kaghan	Peter Jones	Richard Newton
Lucasta Angel	Margaret Leighton	Joan Greenwood
Lady Elizabeth Mulhammer	Isabel Jeans	Ina Claire
Mrs Guzzard	Alison Leggatt	Aline MacMahon

Source: Play text.

== Productions ==
T. S. Eliot's penultimate play premiered at the Edinburgh Festival in 1953, before transferring to the West End with the same cast. It played from September 1953 to April 1954 at the Lyric Theatre before embarking on a UK Tour. It was produced by Henry Sherek and directed by E. Martin Browne. After this, the only known professional production occurred at the Everyman Theatre in Cheltenham in the 1970s. Primavera Productions produced the play as part of the 'rediscoveries season 2007' at the Finborough Theatre, directed by Tom Littler.

The play was first published as a book by Faber and Faber Ltd, London, in 1954.

== Genre ==
Martin Browne announced that the play is “a modern comedy lighter in tone than any of his previous plays". The classification is complicated by the fact that the Eliot does not define it as either comedy or tragedy.

== Sources ==
- Eliot, T. S. (1967) [1954]. The Confidential Clerk. London: Faber & Faber. OCLC 1067563343.
