= Saturday Night (musical) =

- Original Off-Broadway windowcard
- Music: Stephen Sondheim
- Lyrics: Stephen Sondheim
- Book: Julius J. Epstein
- Basis: Front Porch in Flatbush by Julius J. Epstein; Philip G. Epstein
- Productions: 1997 London; 1998 Chicago; 2000 Off-Broadway; 2003 Australia; 2009 West End

Saturday Night is a 1955 musical with music and lyrics by Stephen Sondheim and a book by Julius J. Epstein, based on the play, Front Porch in Flatbush, written by Epstein and his brother Philip.

The first professional musical written by Stephen Sondheim, Saturday Night was intended to open on Broadway in 1955; however, after the sudden death of its lead producer, the show was shelved. Sondheim instead made his professional premiere in 1957 as the lyricist for West Side Story.

Following a student production, Saturday Night was staged at the Bridewell Theatre, London in 1997 and then in Chicago in 1999 and Off-Broadway in 2000. The musical also ran in the West End in 2009.

== Background ==
Saturday Night was scheduled to open in the 1954–55 Broadway season. Announcements of the production appeared in The New York Times, and auditions were held in mid-1955, following some revisions to the music brought about by backers' auditions. In the summer of 1955, it appeared that Saturday Night would be Sondheim's musical debut on Broadway that fall. However, in August 1955, lead producer Lemuel Ayers died, leaving the production with little morale and even less cash. The production was scrapped, and the musical material was shelved.

The show nearly made it to Broadway in 1960, after Jule Styne decided to revive it after working with Sondheim on Gypsy. However, during the audition process, Sondheim halted proceedings due to feeling that his compositional level had outstripped what he had written six years previously. Although a handful of songs from the musical have appeared in revues and on Sondheim compilation albums, the score as a whole went unperformed until 1997.

== Productions ==
The Stephen Sondheim Society supported the first fully staged performance of the musical at the University of Birmingham, having been given permission to stage the show by Sondheim himself. The production was overseen by Professor Stephen Banfield who, also with permission from Sondheim, orchestrated the show for full band from the existing piano scores. Sondheim was unable to attend, but sent his best wishes to all involved. This production was then repeated, in a concert version, the following year at the Bridewell Theatre, London, with Sondheim in attendance. During the post-show Q&A session, a member of The Stephen Sondheim Society asked Mr. Sondheim if he would now allow the show to be performed publicly. He agreed to think about it, after having previously always said 'no!', and Carol Metcalfe, Artistic Director of The Bridewell Theatre, immediately volunteered to stage it. Directed by Carol Metcalfe and Clive Paget, Saturday Night opened at the Bridewell Theatre on December 17, 1997 and closed on January 24, 1998 after 38 performances. The leading role of Gene Gorman was played by Sam Newman. A cast recording was made, distributed by First Night (UK) and RCA Victor (US).

Following that production, the show had its US premiere with the Pegasus Players in Chicago. It opened at the O'Rourke Center for the Performing Arts, Truman College, Chicago, on May 19, 1999 and closed on July 18, 1999. Gary Griffin directed, with choreography by Marc Robin. Sondheim wrote two new song/scenes, "Delighted, I'm Sure" and "Montana Chem". The original book was edited by Sondheim, and there were new orchestrations by Jonathan Tunick. The copyright date for "Delighted, I'm Sure" is 1954 by Sondheim. The other songs have copyright dates from 1973 (Tribute show) to 1999 (Chicago production) and are all by music publishers.

The New York premiere was at the Off-Broadway Second Stage Theatre on February 17, 2000, where it ran until March 26, 2000, for 45 performances. The Second Stage production was directed and choreographed by Kathleen Marshall, and featured David Campbell (Gene), Lauren Ward (Helen), Natascia Diaz (Florence), Christopher Fitzgerald (Bobby), Andréa Burns (Celeste), and Clarke Thorell (Hank). This production won the Drama Desk Award for Outstanding Lyrics. A recording was made with this original New York cast, released on June 20, 2000 by Nonesuch (ASIN: B00004TG64).

When asked his reaction to seeing Saturday Night performed in New York after 40 years, Sondheim replied, "I don't have any emotional reaction to Saturday Night at all — except fondness. It's not bad stuff for a 23-year-old. There are some things that embarrass me so much in the lyrics — the missed accents, the obvious jokes. But I decided, Leave it. It's my baby pictures. You don't touch up a baby picture — you're a baby!"

Magnormos produced the Australasian premiere of Saturday Night in Melbourne in 2003, directed by the company's founder Aaron Joyner. It was first presented at Chapel Off Chapel, and then at the newly opened Federation Square, the first work of musical theatre performed in The Edge theatre. It had successful reviews and was a sell-out. In 2010 Saturday Night was the first musical in Magnormos' A Sondheim Triptych to celebrate the composer's 80th birthday, and it became the first musical theatre piece to perform in the Elisabeth Murdoch Hall, Melbourne Recital Centre.

Primavera Productions produced the first UK revival at the fringe Jermyn Street Theatre in London, running from February 10, 2009 through March 14, 2009; this was the UK premiere of the revised Off-Broadway score. The musical then opened in the West End on March 25, 2009 through April 11 at the Arts Theatre. Directed by Tom Littler, with Musical Direction by Tom Attwood, the production featured a cast including Helena Blackman, David Ricardo-Pearce, David Botham, Charlie Cameron, Lee Drage, Lloyd Gorman, Joanna Hickman, Joanna Hollister, Kevin Millington, David Osmond, Nick Trumble, and Harry Waller.

In October 2011 the Signature Theatre in Arlington County, Virginia presented a concert staging of Saturday Night in its MAX Theatre. The production, directed by Matthew Gardiner, starred Geoff Packard as Gene, Susan Derry as Helen, Eleasha Gamble as Florence/Dakota, William Beech as Bobby, and Tracy Lynn Olivera as Celeste.

In November 2014 the York Theatre Company (New York City) presented a concert staging of Saturday Night as part of its Musicals in Mufti series. The cast included Andrew Keenan-Bolger, Lindsay Mendez, and Ben Fankhauser.

== Plot synopsis ==
In 1929 in Brooklyn, New York, middle-class bachelor friends are restless on several Saturday nights because they have no dates. Gene, who works in a menial position in a Wall Street brokerage, has dreams of the exciting society life to be found in Manhattan, while his friends are content to stay in the neighborhood. Gene meets Helen, who is crashing a party (as is Gene). He schemes to "get rich quick", but his plan backfires and he barely escapes jail.

== Musical numbers ==
Note: From the Second Stage Production

Act I

Overture - Orchestra

- "Saturday Night" - Ted, Artie, Ray, Dino
- "Class" - Gene, Hank, Celeste, Bobby, Artie, Ted, Dino
- "Delighted I'm Sure" - Celeste, Mildred, Hank, Bobby, Ted, Artie, Ray, Dino
- "Love's a Bond" - Vocalist
- "Isn't It?" - Helen
- "In the Movies" - Ted, Artie, Ray, Dino, Hank, Celeste, Mildred
- "Exhibit A" - Bobby
- "A Moment With You" - Vocalist, Gene, Helen
- "Saturday Night" (reprise) - Ted, Artie, Ray, Dino
- Gracious Living Fantasy - Gene & The Gang
- "Montana Chem" - Ted, Artie, Ray, Dino, Hank, Celeste
- "So Many People" - Helen, Gene
- "One Wonderful Day" - Celeste, Hank, Bobby, Mildred, Florence, Ted, Artie, Ray, Dino

Act II

- Entr'acte - The Orchestra
- "Saturday Night" (reprise) - Ted, Artie, Ray, Dino
- "I Remember That" - Hank, Celeste
- "Love's a Bond" Blues - Dakota Doran
- "All for You" - Helen
- "That Kind of a Neighborhood" - Hank, Celeste, Mildred, Florence, Bobby, Ted, Artie, Ray, Dino
- "What More Do I Need?" - Gene, Helen, Hank, Celeste, Mildred, Florence, Bobby, Ted, Artie, Ray, Dino, Clune, Lieutenant
- "One Wonderful Day" (reprise) - The Company
