= The Family Reunion =

Play written by T. S. Eliot

The Family Reunion is a play by T. S. Eliot. Written mostly in blank verse (though not iambic pentameter), it incorporates elements from Greek drama and mid-twentieth-century detective plays to portray the hero's journey from guilt to redemption. The play was unsuccessful when first presented in 1939, and was later regarded as unsatisfactory by its author, but has been successfully revived since the 1940s. Some critics have thought aspects of the tormented hero reflect Eliot's difficulties with his estrangement from his first wife.

== Productions ==
=== Première ===
The play was first performed on 21 March 1939 at the Westminster Theatre, London, with Michael Redgrave as Harry, Helen Haye as Lady Monchensey and Catherine Lacey as Agatha. It ran until 22 April 1939.

=== Revivals ===
Other productions of the play have included:

- Mercury Theatre, London (November 1946) with Alan Wheatley, Catherine Lacey and Henrietta Watson
- Phoenix Theatre, London (June 1956) with Paul Scofield, Sybil Thorndike and Gwen Ffrangcon-Davies
- Vaudeville Theatre, London (April 1979) with Edward Fox, Pauline Jameson and Avril Elgar. Directed by Michael Elliott and originally staged at the Royal Exchange, Manchester
- Swan Theatre, Stratford upon Avon (June 1999; transferred to the Pit Theatre, Barbican Centre, London, February 2000) with Greg Hicks, Margaret Tyzack and Lynn Farleigh
- Donmar Warehouse, London (November 2008) with Samuel West, Gemma Jones and Penelope Wilton directed by Jeremy Herrin

In New York, the play has been staged at the Cherry Lane Theatre in 1947, the Phoenix Theater in 1958, with Fritz Weaver, Florence Reed and Lillian Gish, and by the visiting Royal Shakespeare Company in 2000 (the Swan Theatre production listed above).

== Plot ==
The play is in two acts, set in Wishwood, a stately home in the north of England. At the beginning, the family of Amy, Dowager Lady Monchensey are assembling for her birthday party. She is, as her doctor later explains, clinging on to life by sheer willpower:

...........I keep Wishwood alive
To keep the family alive, to keep them together,
To keep me alive, and I keep them.

Lady Monchensey's two brothers-in-law and three sisters are present, and a younger relation, Mary, but none of Lady Monchensey's three sons. Among other things they discuss the sudden, and not to them wholly unwelcome, death at sea of the wife of the eldest son Harry, the present Lord Monchensey. Neither of the younger sons ever appears, both being slightly injured in motoring accidents, but Harry soon arrives, his first appearance at Wishwood for eight years. He is haunted by the belief that he pushed his wife off the ship. In fact Harry has an alibi for the time, but whether he killed her or not he wished her dead and his feelings of guilt are the driving force in the rest of the play. Lady Monchensey decides that Harry's state warrants the discreet observation of the family doctor, who is invited to join the party, ostensibly as a dinner guest. Mary, who has been earmarked by Amy as a future wife for Harry, wishes to escape from life at Wishwood, but her aunt Agatha tells her that she must wait:

...........You and I, Mary
Are only watchers and waiters, not the easiest role,

Agatha reveals to Harry that his father attempted to kill Amy while Harry was in her womb, and that Agatha prevented him. Far from being grateful, Amy resented and still resents Agatha's depriving her of her husband. Harry, with Agatha's encouragement, announces his intention to go away from Wishwood, leaving his steady younger brother John to take over. Amy, despairing at Harry's renunciation of Wishwood, dies (offstage), "An old woman alone in a damned house", and Harry and his faithful servant, Downing, leave.

== Commentary ==
=== Structure ===
The play is partly in blank verse (though Eliot uses a stress-based metre, with usually four or five stresses per line and not the iambic pentameter) and partly in prose. Eliot had already experimented with verse drama in Murder in the Cathedral, and continued to use the form in his post-war stage works. Though the work has superficial resemblances to a conventional 1930s drawing room drama, Eliot uses two devices from ancient Greek drama:

- Harry's uncles and aunts occasionally detach themselves from the action and chant a commentary on the plot, in the manner of a Greek chorus
- Harry is pursued by the Eumenides – the avenging Furies who pursue Orestes in the Oresteia; they are seen not only by Harry but by his servant and the most perceptive member of his family, Agatha

Despite these Greek themes, Stephen Spender commented that the whole play was "about the hero's discovery of his religious vocation as a result of his sense of guilt."

=== Critical reception ===
Critical reception after the première was cautious. The Manchester Guardian opened its review:

The heart, even of the formidable swarm of intelligence that gathered tonight at the Westminster to see Mr. T. S. Eliot's "The Family Reunion," went out audibly to the family's stupid Uncle Charles when, near curtain-fall, he had the remark: "It's very odd, but I'm beginning to feel that there is something I could understand if I were told it."

The review added that apart from the chorus of baffled uncles and aunts, "one looks elsewhere in vain for any articulate philosophy." The Times commented on the lack of drama in the play, but concluded, "But the play as a whole, though it lacks something of stage force, is still one which Mr Eliot may be proud to have written." The director of the play, E. Martin Browne summed up the critical response:

The play was received with incomprehension, exemplified in James Agate's silly-clever review in a parody of its verse. March 1939 was not the best moment for a work which pulls off blinkers: England was still trying too hard to keep them on.

In 1951, in the first Theodore Spencer Memorial Lecture at Harvard University, Eliot criticised his own plays, specifically Murder in the Cathedral, The Family Reunion, and The Cocktail Party. Eliot regarded The Family Reunion as seriously flawed for reasons that may be summarised as follows:

- The play is badly paced, coming to an excessively abrupt conclusion after "an interminable amount of preparation."
- The Greek elements are not successfully integrated into the work:
  - the attempt to portray the House of Monchensey as a British House of Atreus poisoned to its roots by sins both recent and long ago fails either to stick closely to Aeschylus or to venture far enough away from him, and so remains marooned in an artistic no man's land
  - the attempt to transform the aunts and uncles into a Greek chorus is unsuccessful
  - the Furies are a failure, as they look like uninvited guests from a fancy dress ball
- It is hard for an audience to sympathise with a hero who renounces his mother, his house and his heritage for the spiritual life, when he is plainly, in Eliot's words, "an insufferable prig."

By the time of the 1956 revival, Kenneth Tynan was referring to "this has-been, would-be masterpiece": "though Mr Eliot can always lower the dramatic temperature, he can never raise it: and this is why the theatre, an impure assembly that loves strong emotions, must ultimately reject him."

Acknowledging the flaws in the work, the Eliot scholar Helen Gardner wrote, "Both plot and persons fail to reveal to us, as drama must, a spectacle for our contemplation. Because there is no real action there are no real persons." However, Gardner added, "The progress from Burnt Norton to Little Gidding would hardly have been possible without The Family Reunion. Writing for the Guardian, Maddy Costa concluded the play was more of a "curio" than a play, but leaves you "in awe" of Eliot's poetry (which is described as mesmerising)

=== Harry ===
A contemporary review described Harry as "an unresolved amalgam of Orestes and Hamlet" and Eliot himself had vetoed the casting of John Gielgud because he thought him "not religious enough to understand the character's motivation." Some modern critics see in Harry a parallel with Eliot's own emotional difficulties of the time, with his estrangement from his first wife. The director of the first production, and Michael Redgrave who first played Harry, both asked Eliot, "What happens to Harry after he leaves?" Eliot responded with an additional fifty lines to Harry's scene with Amy and Agatha (Part II, scene 2) in which his destination is said to be "somewhere on the other side of despair".

=== Chorus ===
In the 1930s, the verse chorus was enjoying a revival begun by Gilbert Murray's well-received translations of Greek drama, presented by Harley Granville Barker. Eliot himself had already employed such a chorus in Murder in the Cathedral but his chorus of uncles and aunts in The Family Reunion differs radically from the Greek model and his own earlier version in that their comments are not for the enlightenment of the audience but are expressions of their own perplexity:

There is nothing at all to be done about it;
There is nothing to do about anything.
And now it is nearly time for the News;
We must listen to the Weather Report
And the international catastrophes

Their absurdity acts as comic relief. Although Eliot came to think that the chorus was a failure, reviewers in the present century have commented more favourably: "The transformation of Harry's buffoonish aunts and uncles into a Greek chorus is at once absurd and compelling." "The chorus… are doubly effective when retreating into the spotlight from their own amusingly stereotyped personalities.".

=== Text ===
Before the 1946 revival, Eliot considered revising the play, but "as soon as I start thinking about the play, I have inklings of altering it still further" and rather than completely rewrite his 1939 text Eliot felt "it would be healthier to leave it alone" and he started work on a new play, "One-Eyed Riley", which became The Cocktail Party. Despite his own criticism of The Family Reunion in his 1951 lecture, Eliot let the original text stand.
