= Mercury Theatre, Notting Hill Gate =

Former theatre in London, England

Coordinates: 51.510°N 0.199°W

Mercury Theatre
- Address: 2 Ladbroke Road, Notting Hill Gate, London WII
- Owner: Ashley Dukes
- Type: small theatre venue/ballet venue
- Capacity: 150 seating

Construction
- Built: 1851
- Opened: 1933
- Closed: 1987

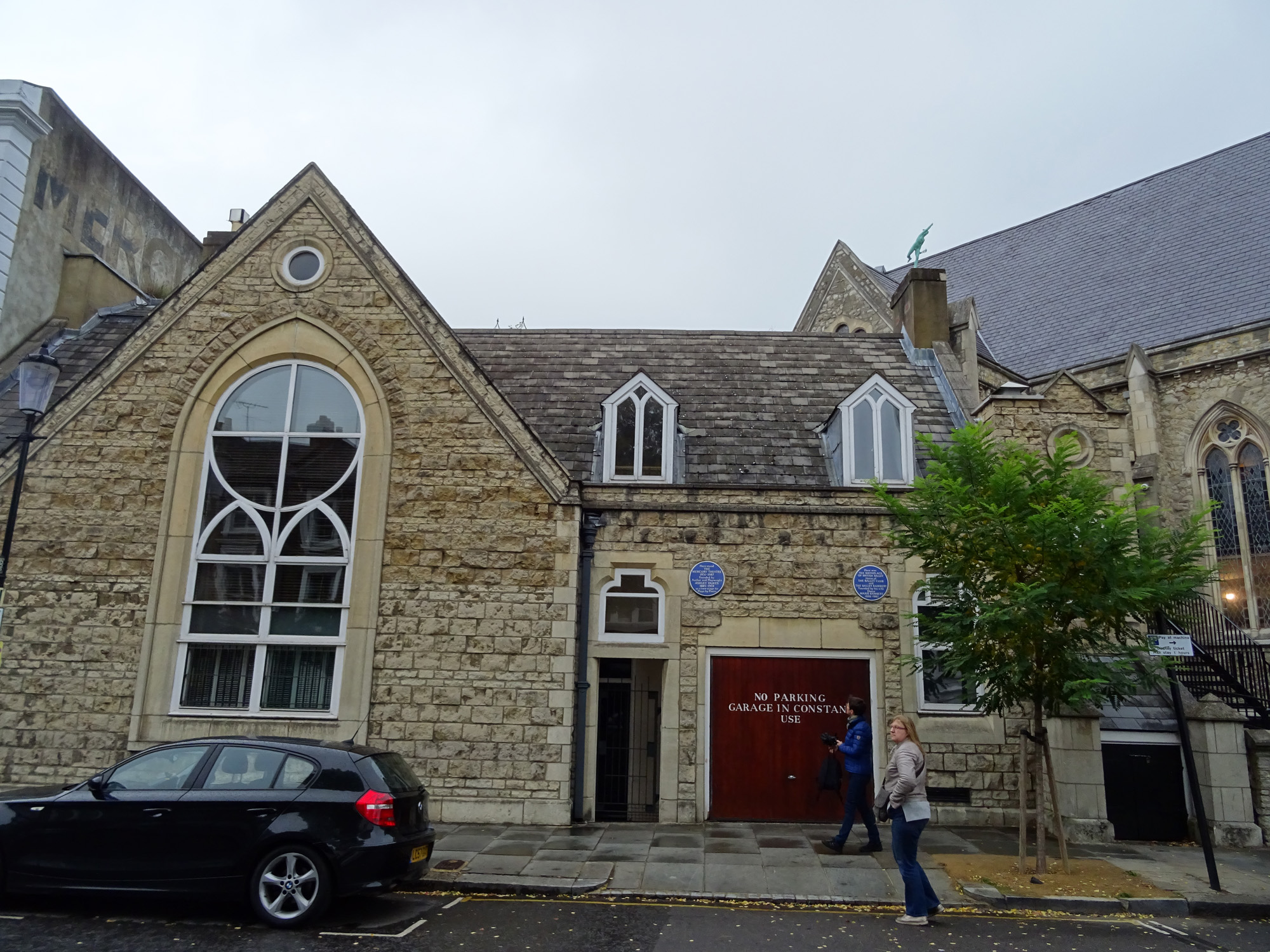
Mercury theatre building in 2015. The figure of Mercury is top right

The Mercury Theatre was a small theatre on Ladbroke Road, Notting Hill Gate, London, notable for the productions of poetic dramas between 1933 and 1956, and as the home of the Ballet Rambert until 1987.

== History (founding) ==
The Mercury Theatre was opened in 1933 by Ashley Dukes for the production of new drama and to serve as a centre for the Ballet Rambert, run by his wife Marie Rambert. The building, at 2, Ladbroke Road, London W11, had been built in 1851 as a Sunday school for the adjacent Congregational Chapel, but was extensively altered to serve as a theatre. It was a well-equipped but small venue, seating about 150.

== Productions ==
The style was set by the first production, Jupiter Translated, an adaptation of Molière's Amphitryon by Walter James Turner with a ballet by Rupert Doone as entr'acte. Vladimir Rosing's British Opera Group was in residence for several weeks in June 1935. The theatre's reputation was further established in 1935 by the first London productions of T. S. Eliot's Murder in the Cathedral, transferred from Canterbury, and two years later by W. H. Auden and Christopher Isherwood's collaborative poetic play The Ascent of F6.

1943 saw the production of Eugene O'Neill's Days Without End. The Pilgrim Players' seasons in 1945–1947, under the direction of E. Martin Browne, consolidated the position of poetic drama at the Mercury with such productions as Norman Nicholson's The Old Man of the Mountains, Ronald Duncan's This Way to the Tomb, Florida Scott-Maxwell's experimental I Said to Myself, and Anne Ridler's The Shadow Factory. These were followed by comedies in verse: Christopher Fry's A Phoenix Too Frequent and Donagh MacDonagh's Happy as Larry.

In 1947 William Saroyan's The Beautiful People and O'Neill's SS Glencairn both had their London premières there, as did Jean Genet's The Maids. In the early 1950s it was home to "Ballet Workshop" and from 1956 was used mainly by the Ballet Rambert School until finally closed in 1987. The theatre and the Ballet Rambert appear in Powell and Pressburger's 1948 film The Red Shoes. Today the building is distinguished by a small bronze figure of Mercury mounted on the east end of the roof and commemorative plaques for both the theatre and the ballet company.
