= Henry Sherek =

British theatre manager (1900-1967)

- Born: 23 April 1900; London
- Died: 23 September 1967; Venice
- Occupation: Theatre manager
- Spouse: Kathleen Pamela Mary Corona (aka Pamela Carme) (m. 1937)
- Father: Bernard Sherek
- Relatives: Evelyn Boscawen, 7th Viscount Falmouth (father-in-law)
- Military career
- Allegiance: United Kingdom
- Branch: British Army
- Service years: 1939–1944
- Rank: Major
- Unit: The Rifle Brigade
- Conflicts: World War II

Jules Henry Sherek (1900–1967) was a British theatrical manager, known for producing the plays of T. S. Eliot.

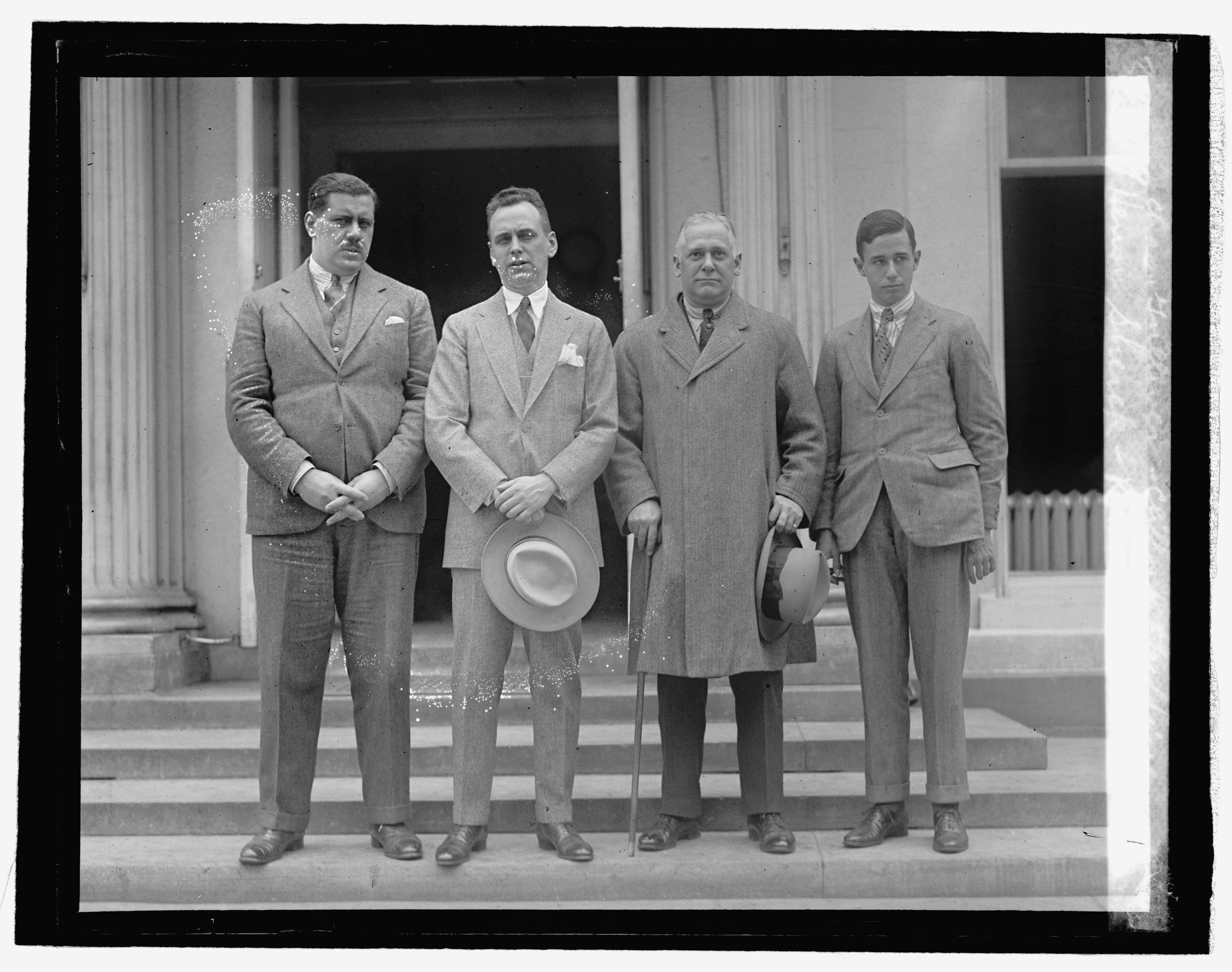
Sherek (left)

Sherek was born on 23 April 1900, at 2 Guilford Street, London, to Bernard a merchant (and later an international theatrical agent), and Margarette (née Jacoby). He was educated at the Waren Gymnasium in Germany, where he became fluent in German, and at a school in Switzerland, where he learned to speak French. He was severely wounded while in the Near East during World War I, having lied about his age in order to enlist while only 15.

Following the war, and after a period in the United States working for David Belasco and at a theatrical agency, he took over his father's agency.

In 1937, he married the actress Pamela Carme (real name Kathleen Pamela Mary Corona Boscawen; 1902–1995), who was the daughter of the Evelyn Boscawen, 7th Viscount Falmouth. She retired from acting to be her husband's business partner.

During World War II, he again served in the British army, becoming a major before being invalided out in 1944.

He produced the T.S. Eliot plays The Cocktail Party, The Confidential Clerk, and The Elder Statesman. All were directed by E. Martin Browne.

He appeared as a castaway on the BBC Radio programme Desert Island Discs on 15 June 1959.

Examples of his correspondence with Sir Cecil Beaton are included in the latter's papers, in the library of St John's College, Cambridge.

After spending his retirement in Geneva, he died in Venice on 23 September 1967.

== Bibliography ==
- —— (1959). Not in Front of the Children or Malice in Wonderland. Heinemann.
