= Florida Scott-Maxwell =

American dramatist (1883–1979)

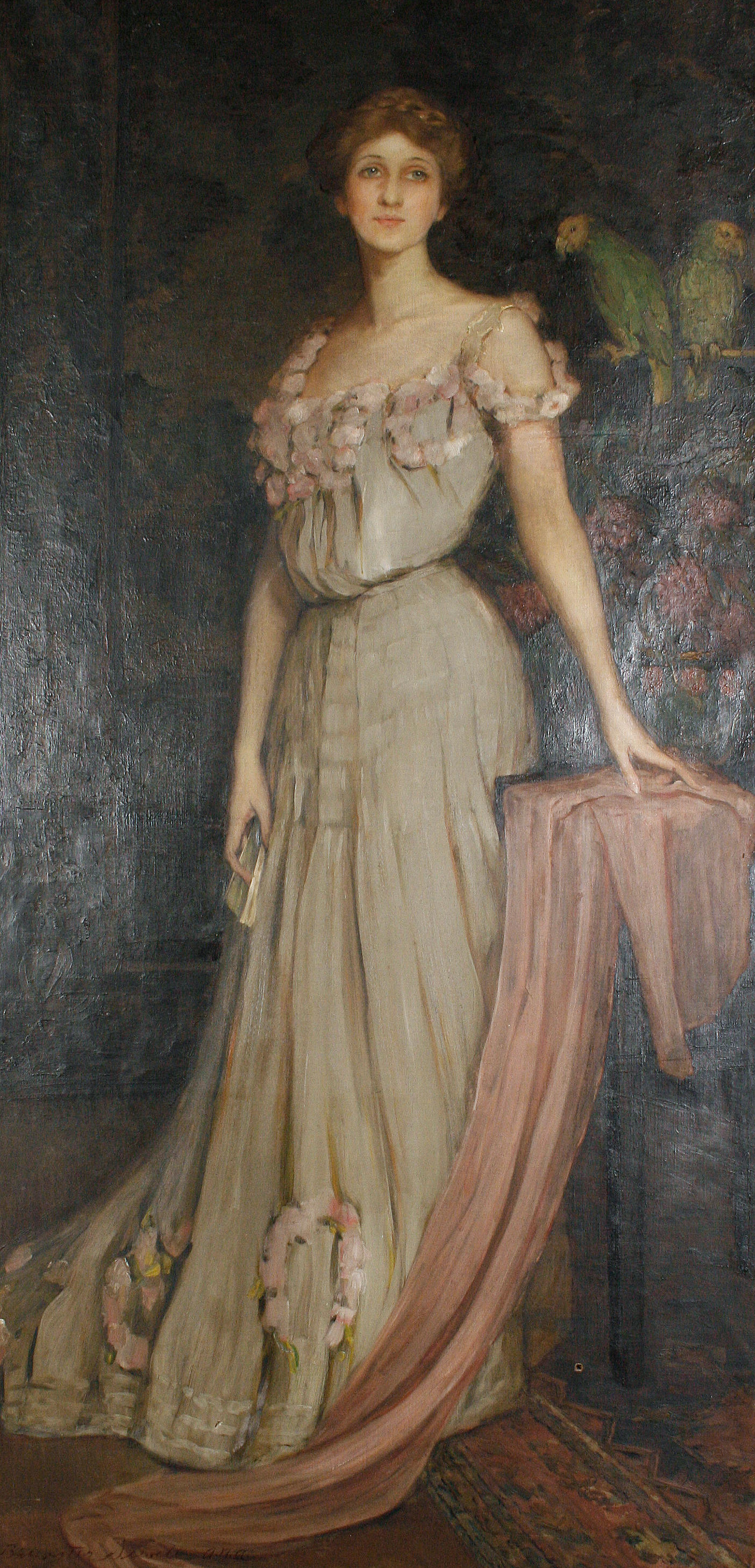
- Florida Scott-Maxwell ca. 1910 by Amanda Brewster Sewell
- Born: Florida Pier; 14 September 1883; Orange Park, Florida
- Died: 6 March 1979 (aged 95); Exeter, England
- Occupation: Writer
- Spouse: John Maxwell Scott-Maxwell (m. 1910–1929) (divorced)

Florida Scott-Maxwell (née Pier; 14 September 1883 – 6 March 1979) was a playwright, author and psychologist.

== Biography ==
Florida Pier was born in Orange Park, Florida in 1883 and was raised in Pittsburgh, living with her father's side of the family, who were Unitarians. She was educated at home until the age of ten. After then, she went to art school until she was 13 and then went to a drama school in New York City. Scott-Maxwell had small Broadway roles at age 16. She acted with the Edwin Mayo Theater Company. Around age 20, she first started writing and publishing short stories. Florida Pier became the first woman on the staff at the New York Evening Sun where she had a weekly column.

In 1910 she married John Maxwell Scott-Maxwell and moved to her husband's native Scotland, and lived in Baillieston House 6 miles east of Glasgow where she worked for women's suffrage and as a playwright.

They had four children: sons Stephen, Peter and Denis, and a daughter Hilary. The couple divorced in 1929 and she moved to London. Her second play, Many Women was staged at the Arts Theatre in 1932.

In 1933 she studied Jungian psychology under Carl Jung and practiced as an analytical psychologist in both England and Scotland. During World War II, she worked on her psychological practice in Edinburgh. Later, she moved to Exeter. During this time, she also worked for the BBC as a commentator. The BBC interviewed her about aging in July of 1954. She also discussed topics such as loneliness, on the "Woman's Hour." Scott-Maxwell maintained her psychological practice for around 25 years. Her most famous book is The Measure of My Days (1968).

Florida Scott-Maxwell died in Exeter, England on 6 March 1979, aged 95.

== Work ==
Scott-Maxwell's first play, The Flash Point (1914) was a feminist work. Later, she continued to write as a way to earn a living, creating short stories, reviews and more. Her second play, Many Women, was published in 1932.

Her first book, Towards Relationship, was published in 1939. In the Callander Advertiser and Killin Times, the reviewer is especially drawn to Scott-Maxwell's interpretation of modern women and their relationship to others and themselves.

The book, Women and Sometimes Men (1957) is a psychological book written for general consumption. A reviewer from the Wichita Falls Times wrote, "This study is written in beautiful prose and without the usual verbiage and terminology of the scientist." The book touches on themes of femininity, masculinity and the relationship of these concepts to modern life. The book also addresses difficulties women encounter while trying to continue their own sense of individuality when they are filling traditional gender roles. The San Francisco Examiner wrote that the book "contains some of the most quotable and controversial writing of the season." The Chicago Tribune wrote that "The author seeks to find some new balance between men and women."

Her play, I Said to Myself, was presented at the Mercury Theatre in 1947. The Kensington and Chelsea News described it as "a pleasant total of a comedy." The Daily Telegraph called the play "an exciting experiment in a new technique."

Scott-Maxwell's Measure of My Days (1968) was written first as a journal when the writer was in her 80s and living in a nursing home. Scott-Maxwell writes about old age with passion and curiosity in her journal. The book also contains reflections on family relationships.

== Selected works ==
- The Power of Ancestors (short story, 1906)
- Musty, Dusty Mr. Cullender (short story, 1910)
- Mrs Nolly's Real Self (short story, 1911)
- The Flash-Point. A play in three acts. 1914
- The Kinsmen Knew How to Die (as "Florida Pier", with Sophie Botcharsky, 1931).
- Pray for the Princess (short story, 1931)
- Many Women (play) 1932. Produced at the Arts Theatre, London.
- Towards Relationship (non-fiction) 1939
- I Said to Myself (play) 1946. Produced at the Mercury Theatre, London
- Women and Sometimes Men (non-fiction) 1957
- The Measure of My Days (autobiography) 1968
