= Jermyn Street Theatre =

Theatre in London, England

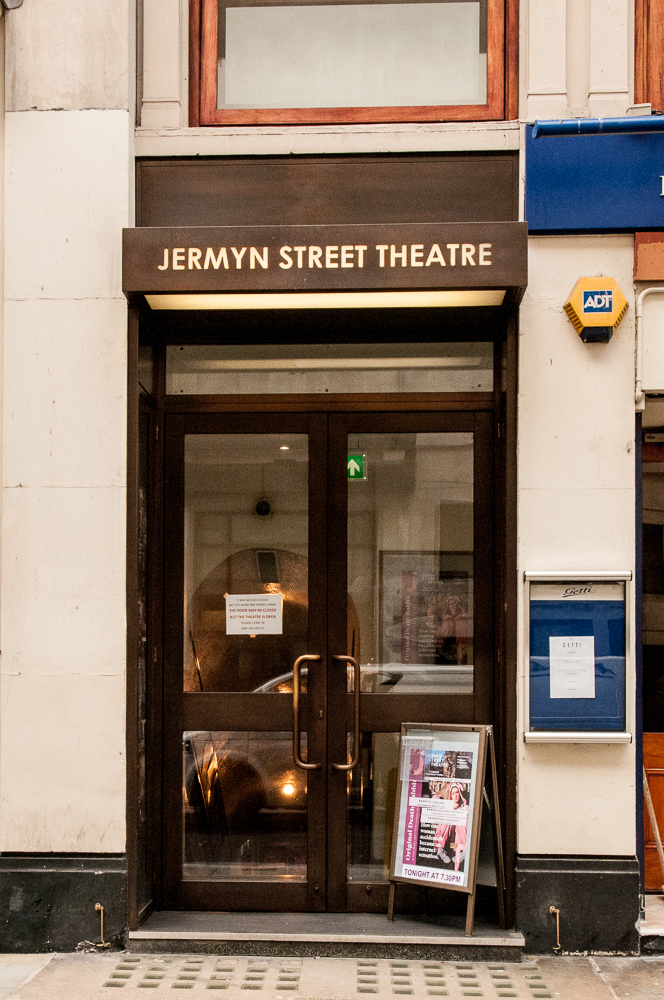
- Interactive map of Jermyn Street Theatre
- Address: 16b Jermyn Street; London, SW1; United Kingdom
- Coordinates: 51.5092°N 0.1345°W
- Capacity: 70
- Type: West End Studio Theatre
- Event: Theatre
- Public transit: Piccadilly Circus

Construction
- Opened: August 1994; 32 years ago

Website
- jermynstreettheatre.co.uk

Jermyn Street Theatre is a performance venue situated on Jermyn Street, in London's West End. It is an Off West End studio theatre.

== History ==
Jermyn Street Theatre opened in August 1994. It was formerly the changing rooms for staff at a Spaghetti House restaurant and originally the cellar of the Kent & Sussex Tavern up until 1838. The space was transformed under the leadership of Howard Jameson and Penny Horner into a 70-seat studio theatre. They both remain the Chair of the Board and Executive Director respectively. In 1995, Neil Marcus became the first Artistic Director and Jermyn Street received their Lottery Grant in 1997. During this time, producer Chris Grady contributed to Jermyn Street Theatre's development. Princess Michael of Kent became the theatre's patron in 1995 and David Babani, later the founder of the Menier Chocolate Factory, took over as artistic director in 1998 until 2001.

Jermyn Street Theatre has become a staple of London's Off-West End studio theatre. It received a lot of attention following successful productions of Barefoot in the Park directed by Sally Hughes and starring Alan Cox and Rachel Pickup, and Helping Harry directed by Nickolas Grace and starring Adrian Lukis and Simon Dutton. In the late 2000s, under the artistic direction of Gene David Kirk, Jermyn Street expanded its repertoire to include revivals of obscure plays such as the UK premiere of St John's Night by Henrik Ibsen, Little Eyolf starring Imogen Stubbs and Doreen Mantle by Henrik Ibsen, and the postwar classic The River Line by Charles Morgan. Samuel Beckett's All That Fall, premiered at Jermyn Street Theatre in 2012, directed by Trevor Nunn and starring Eileen Atkins and Michael Gambon. It then transferred to the Arts Theatre and later would transfer to the New York's 59E59 Theatre In 2011, Jermyn Street Theatre received a Peter Brook Empty Space Award nomination. One year later, the theatre won The Stage 100 Best Fringe Theatre.

Following the rising success of Jermyn Street Theatre under the artistic direction of Gene David Kirk was Anthony Biggs who took over as Artistic Director in 2013. He focused on international playwrights and new works. During Biggs' time, Jermyn Street Theatre produced a repertory season of South African drama and new works by Jonathan Lewis (A Level Playing Field), Sarah Daniels (Soldiers' Wives), and American playwright Rae Spiegel (Dry Land). Biggs also revived The First Man by American playwright Eugene O'Neill, First World War drama Flowers of the Forest by John Van Druten, and First Episode, Terence Rattigan's first play, directed by Tom Littler.

In 2017, Tom Littler became Artistic Director and Executive Producer. His first production was the world premiere of Howard Brenton's The Blinding Light. This marked the sixth production Littler has directed at Jermyn Street Theatre. Previous credits include praised revivals of Stephen Sondheim's Anyone Can Whistle and Saturday Night which transferred to the Arts Theatre. Since Tom Littler's appointment as Artistic Director, Jermyn Street Theatre has been re-launched into a full-scale producing theatre, with eight to ten productions making up an annual season. The theatre's creative output is focused on staging new plays, rare revivals, innovative adaptations of European classics, and outstanding musicals, alongside one-off literary events. Jermyn Street Theatre is committed to ensuring that at least fifty percent of all on stage and off stage creatives are women.

In 2018, Littler directed the first complete West End revival of Noël Coward's Tonight at 8.30, featuring a cast of nine actors playing 73 roles. In his tenure, Jermyn Street Theatre often co-produced with regional theatres including York Theatre Royal, the Watermill Theatre, Theatre by the Lake, Theatre Royal Bath, Creation Theatre, the Stephen Joseph Theatre, and Guildford Shakespeare Company.

During its closure over lockdown in 2020, the theatre responded with its Brave New World season of digital work, including the complete cycle of Shakespeare's sonnets performed by a mixture of graduating drama students and household names including Helena Bonham Carter and Olivia Colman and the acclaimed 15 Heroines with DigitalTheatre+ featuring adaptations of Ovid from writers including Juliet Gilkes Romero and Timberlake Wertenbaker.

In 2021, they won the Stage Award for Fringe Theatre of the Year, making it the first theatre to win the award twice. Their contribution to groundbreaking digital work, and support for theatre freelancers during lockdown was recognised at the 2022 Critics Circle Awards, where they won an award for "Exceptional theatre-making during lockdown" alongside Nica Burns, the National Theatre, the Old Vic, and Original Theatre Company. In his final year as Artistic Director, Littler received the 2022 Offie for Best Artistic Director.

In autumn 2022, Stella Powell-Jones and David Doyle succeeded Tom Littler as Artistic Director and Executive Producer respectively, working alongside Executive Director Penny Horner to form a management team of three.

== Awards and nominations ==
- Winner The Critics Circle Award for "Exceptional theatre-making during lockdown" (2022)
- Winner The Stage Awards Fringe Theatre of the Year (2021)
- Shortlisted Broadway World Awards Best Performance Ensemble for Pictures of Dorian Gray (2019)
- Winner The Stage Awards Fringe Theatre of the Year (2012)

=== Off West End theatre awards ===
| Year | Nominee / work | Award | Result |
|---|---|---|---|
| 2025 | Skye Hallam / The Voice of the Turtle (2024) | Supporting Performance in a Play | Nominated |
| 2025 | Adrian Lukis / Being Mr Wickham (2024) | Solo Performance in a Play | Nominated |
| 2025 | Janie Dee / Laughing Boy (2024) | Lead Performance in a Play | Nominated |
| 2025 | Ebenezer Bamgboye / Lonely Londoners (2024) | Director | Nominated |
| 2025 | Elliott Griggs / Lonely Londoners (2024) | Lighting Design | Nominated |
| 2025 | Nevena Stojkov / Lonely Londoners (2024) | Choreography / Movement | Nominated |
| 2025 | Roy Williams / Lonely Londoners (2024) | New Play | Nominated |
| 2025 | Lonely Londoners (2024) | Production | Nominated |
| 2025 | Two Rounds (2024) | OffComm | Nominated |
| 2025 | The Beautiful Future is Coming (2024) | Lead Performance in a Play | Nominated |
| 2025 | Luca Kamleh-Chapman / The EU Killed My Dad (2024) | Lead Performance in a Play | Nominated |
| 2025 | The EU Killed My Dad (2024) | Production | Nominated |
| 2025 | Talene Monahan / The Good John Proctor (2024) | New Play | Nominated |
| 2025 | The Good John Proctor (2024) | Performance Ensemble | Nominated |
| 2024 | Odyssey (2023) | Panto Set Design | Nominated |
| 2024 | Odyssey (2023) | Panto Performance | Nominated |
| 2024 | Odyssey (2023) | Panto Production | Won |
| 2024 | Cat Fuller / Owners (2023) | Set Design | Nominated |
| 2024 | Laura Doddington / Owners (2023) | Lead Performance in a Play | Nominated |
| 2024 | Owners (2023) | Production | Nominated |
| 2024 | Fotini Dimou / Infamous (2023) | Set Design | Nominated |
| 2024 | Caroline Quentin / Infamous (2023) | Lead Performance in a Play | Nominated |
| 2024 | Jasper Jacob / Spiral (2023) | Lead Performance in a Play | Nominated |
| 2024 | Laura Doddington / Yours Unfaithfully (2023) | Lead Performance in a Play | Nominated |
| 2024 | Archie Backhouse, Daniel Boyd, Alan Cox, Julius D'Silva, Forbes Masson, David Yelland / Farm Hall (2023) | Performance Ensemble | Nominated |
| 2024 | Katherine Moar / Farm Hall (2023) | Most Promising New Playwright (Play) | Nominated |
| 2023 | Jennifer Kirby / The Massive Tragedy of Madame Bovary! (2022) | Lead Performance in a Play | Nominated |
| 2023 | Scarlett Brookes, Elisabeth Snegir, Ojan Genc / The Anarchist (2022) | Performance Ensemble | Nominated |
| 2023 | Ebenezer Bamgboye / The Anarchist (2022) | Director | Nominated |
| 2023 | Emily Stuart / Orlando (2022) | Costume Design | Nominated |
| 2023 | Taylor McClaine / Orlando (2022) | Newcomer | Nominated |
| 2023 | Stella Powell-Jones / Orlando (2022) | Director | Nominated |
| 2023 | Orlando (2022) | Production | Nominated |
| 2023 | Kelly Burke, Natasha Byrne, Mark Huckett, Alyssa Simon / The Marriage of Alice B. Toklas by Gertrude Stein (2022) | Performance Ensemble | Nominated |
| 2023 | Machiko Weston / The Marriage of Alice B. Toklas by Gertrude Stein (2022) | Set Design | Nominated |
| 2023 | Matthew Parker / Thrill Me: The Leopold & Loeb Story (2022) | Director (Musical) | Finalist |
| 2023 | Bart Lambert, Jack Reitman, Benjamin McQuigg / Thrill Me: The Leopold & Loeb Story (2022) | Performance Ensemble | Nominated |
| 2023 | Thrill Me: The Leopold & Loeb Story (2022) | Production | Nominated |
| 2023 | Rachael Ryan / Thrill Me: The Leopold & Loeb Story (2022) | Set Design | Nominated |
| 2023 | Chris McDonnell / Thrill Me: The Leopold & Loeb Story (2022) | Lighting Design | Nominated |
| 2023 | Simon Arrowsmith / Thrill Me: The Leopold & Loeb Story (2022) | Sound Design | Nominated |
| 2022 | Tom Littler | Artistic Director (Special Award) | Won |
| 2022 | Justin Teasdale, Thom Townsend & Jamie Kubisch Wiles / Lone Flyer (2021) | Sound Design | Nominated |
| 2022 | Hannah Edwards / Lone Flyer (2021) | Lead Performance in a Play | Nominated |
| 2022 | Benedict Salter / Lone Flyer (2021) | Supporting Performance in a Play | Finalist |
| 2022 | Lucy Betts / Lone Flyer (2021) | Director | Won |
| 2022 | Footfalls & Rockaby (2021) | Production | Nominated |
| 2022 | Lone Flyer (2021) | Production | Nominated |
| 2022 | This Beautiful Future (2021) | Production | Finalist |
| 2021 | Michael Pennington / The Tempest (2020) | Lead Performance in a Play | Nominated |
| 2020 | Stanton Wright, Helen Reuben, Augustina Seymour, Richard Keightley / Pictures of Dorian Gray (2019) | Performance Ensemble | Nominated |
| 2020 | Gavin Fowler, Hannah Morrish, Miranda Foster, Robert Mountford, Stefan Bednarczyk, Ceri-Lyn Cissone / All's Well That Ends Well (2019) | Performance Ensemble | Nominated |
| 2020 | Sally Scott / Agnes Colander (2019) | Female Performance in a Supporting Role in a Play | Nominated |
| 2020 | Naomi Frederick / Agnes Colander (2019) | Female Performance in a Play | Nominated |
| 2020 | Emma Barclay / One Million Tiny Plays About Britain (2019) | Female Performance in a Play | Nominated |
| 2020 | Malcolm Rennie / Shakleton's Carpenter (2019) | Male Performance in a Play | Nominated |
| 2020 | Tom Littler / All's Well That Ends Well (2019) | Director | Finalist |
| 2020 | Trevor Nunn / Agnes Colander (2019) | Director | Nominated |
| 2020 | Tom Littler / Creditors (2019) | Director | Nominated |
| 2020 | Laura Keefe / One Million Tiny Plays About Britain (2019) | Director | Nominated |
| 2020 | All's Well That Ends Well (2019) | Production | Nominated |
| 2020 | Robert Jones / Agnes Colander (2019) | Costume Design | Nominated |
| 2020 | Emily Stuart / Pictures of Dorian Gray (2019) | Costume Design | Nominated |
| 2020 | Paul Pyant / Agnes Colander (2019) | Lighting Design | Nominated |
| 2020 | Robert Jones / Agnes Colander (2019) | Set Design | Nominated |
| 2020 | William Reynolds / Pictures of Dorian Gray (2019) | Set Design | Nominated |
| 2020 | Neil Irish and Annet Black / All's Well That Ends Well (2019) | Set Design | Nominated |
| 2020 | Ceci Calf / One Million Tiny Plays About Britain (2019) | Set Design | Nominated |
| 2020 | Matt Eaton / All's Well That Ends Well (2019) | Sound Design | Won |
| 2020 | Matt Eaton / Pictures of Dorian Gray (2019) | Sound Design | Nominated |
| 2019 | Sinead Cusack / Stitchers (2018) | Female Performance in a Play | Nominated |
| 2019 | Miquel Brown / The Play About My Dad (2018) | Female Performance in a Play | Nominated |
| 2019 | Elizabeth Mansfield / Hymn To Love (2018) | Female Performance in a Play | Nominated |
| 2019 | Tonight at 8:30 (2018) | Ensemble | Nominated |
| 2019 | Burke and Hare (2018) | Ensemble | Nominated |
| 2019 | Tom Littler / Tonight at 8:30 (2018) | Director | Nominated |
| 2019 | Abigail Pickard Price / Burke and Hare (2018) | Director | Nominated |
| 2019 | Tonight at 8:30 (2018) | Production | Nominated |
| 2019 | Max Pappenheim / Stitchers (2018) | Sound Design | Nominated |
| 2019 | Louie Whitemore / Tonight At 8:30 (2018) | Set Design | Nominated |
| 2019 | Liz Cooke / Stitchers (2018) | Set Design | Nominated |
| 2019 | Daisy Blower / Billy Bishop Goes To War (2018) | Set Design | Nominated |
| 2018 | Stephen Unwin / All Our Children (2017) | Most Promising New Playwright | Finalist |
| 2016 | Neil Irish / First Episode (2015) | Set Design | Finalist |
| 2016 | Tim Sanders and Charles Miller / Return of the Soldier (2015) | New Musical | Finalist |
| 2014 | Eileen Atkins / All That Fall (2013) | New Musical | Won |
| 2013 | Howard Hudson / Burlesque (2012) | Lighting Design | Won |
| 2013 | Burlesque (2012) | New Musical | Won |
| 2012 | Emily Stuart / Anyone Can Whistle (2011) | Costume Design | Won |
