= Ladbroke Road =

London street

Coordinates: 51°30′32″N 0°12′11″W

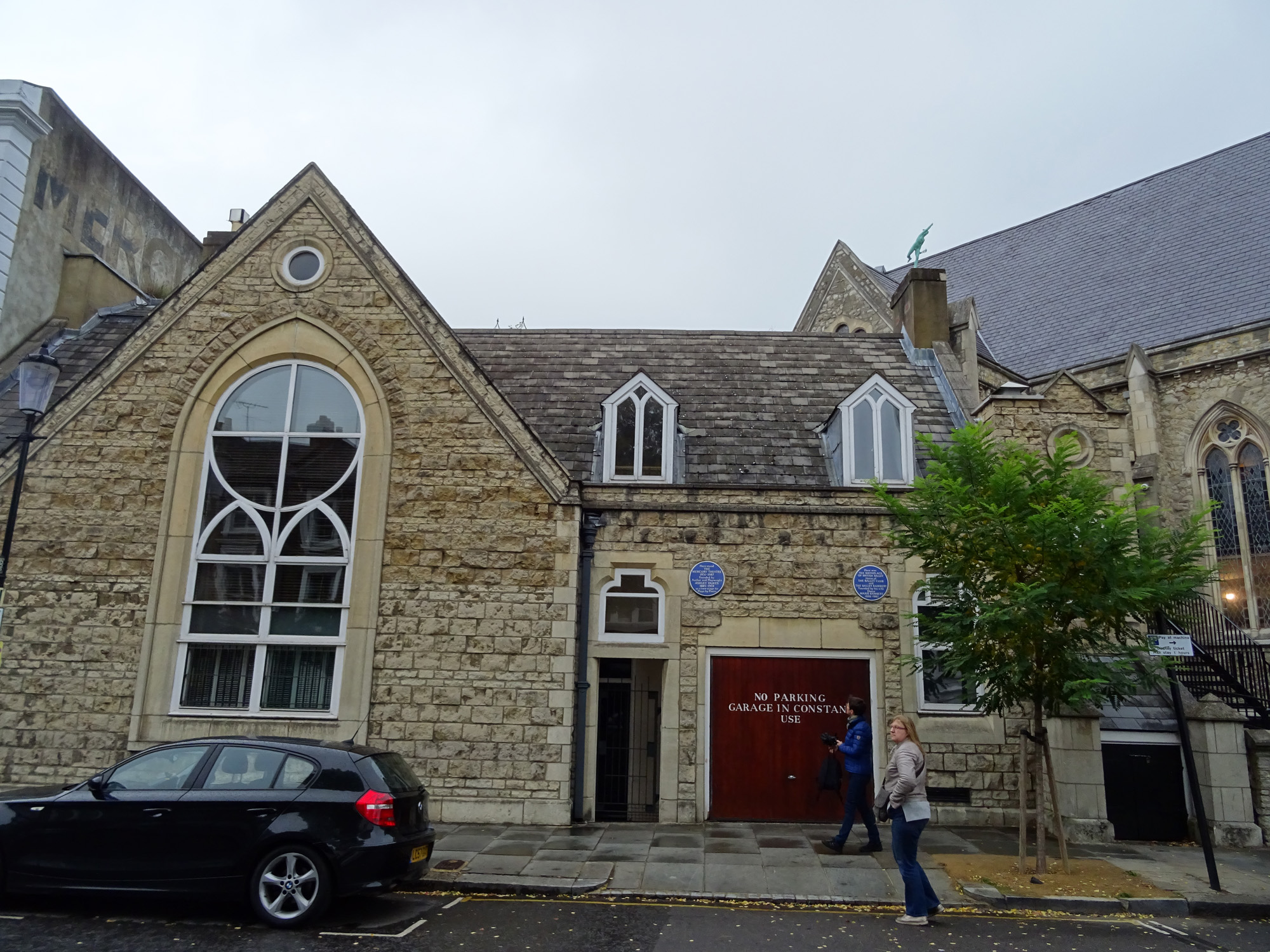
Mercury Theatre, Ladbroke Road, in 2015

Ladbroke Road is a street in Notting Hill, London.

It runs roughly west to east from its junction with Portland Road to one with Kensington Park Road.

The Mercury Theatre was based at no 2 from 1933 until its closure in 1987. The building dates to 1851, and was originally a Sunday school, and is now a private home.

The £32 million sale of Horbury Villa at no. 85 in 2019 by William Woodward-Fisher to the daughter of Georgian billionaire Badri Patarkatsishvili went to the High Court and the judge ruled in 2025 that the new owners were due a full refund due to an undeclared moth infestation.
