= Horbury Villa =

House in Notting Hill, London

Coordinates: 51°30′32″N 0°12′08″W

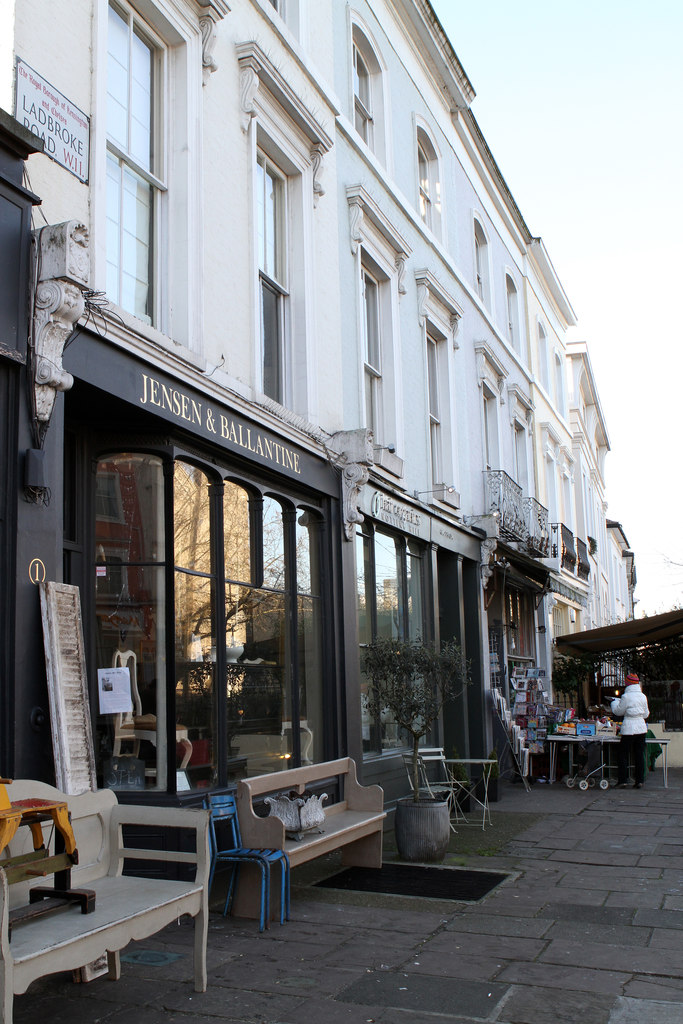
Shops on Ladbroke Road in 2012

Horbury Villa is a large house at no. 85 Ladbroke Road, Notting Hill, London. It has seven bedrooms, a pool, spa, gym, wine room, library, and a cinema.

The original house was probably built in the 1850s, and in the late 1960s/early 1970s its owner acquired the derelict sites of Nos. 87, 89 and 91, demolished what was there and built a large garage and sun room and extended his garden. It was later owned by the actor Martin Starkie, until his death in 2010.

William Woodward-Fisher, a property developer, and his wife Kerry, an interior designer, bought the house in 2011. They hugely extended and remodelled the property.

In 2019, Woodward-Fisher sold the house to Iya Patarkatsishvili (daughter of Georgian billionaire Badri Patarkatsishvili) and Dr Yevhen Hunyak (a dentist) for £32 million. In February 2025, the High Court ruled that due to an undeclared moth infestation, the purchase price plus damages and stamp duty, less a sum for the new owners' use of the house should be refunded.
