= The Rock (play) =

1934 pageant play with words by T. S. Eliot and music by Martin Shaw

The Rock was a pageant play with words by T. S. Eliot and music by Martin Shaw, first performed at Sadler's Wells Theatre in London on 28 May 1934.

In a prefatory note Eliot disclaimed full responsibility for the text, saying "I cannot consider myself the author of the "play", but only of the words which are printed here." By Eliot's account, the text was written in collaboration with director E. Martin Browne and R. Webb-Odell.

"Choruses from The Rock" are published as part of T.S. Eliot Collected Poems, 1909–1962.
