= E. Martin Browne =

British theatre director

Elliott Martin Browne CBE (29 January 1900 – 27 April 1980) was a British theatre director, known for his production of twentieth century verse plays. He collaborated for many years with T. S. Eliot and was first producer of many of his plays including Murder in the Cathedral.

== Early life ==
Elliott Martin Browne was born in Zeals, Wiltshire, on 29 January 1900, the third son of Colonel Percival John Browne. He was educated at Eton College, and Christ Church, Oxford, where he studied modern history and theology. Between 1923 and 1930 he worked at a variety of jobs related to drama, in Kent, Doncaster, London and in the United States as assistant professor of drama at the Carnegie Institute of Technology, Pittsburgh. In 1924 he married the actress Henzie Raeburn, who subsequently appeared in many of his productions. They had two sons.

== First work with Eliot ==
In 1930 he returned to England and was appointed by George Bell, Bishop of Chichester, to be director of religious drama for the diocese. One of Browne's early assignments was to organise a pageant, The Rock, to raise funds for the building of Anglican churches. At the request of Bishop Bell, T. S. Eliot wrote a series of choruses linking the loosely historical scenes of the pageant, which was played by amateurs and presented at Sadler's Wells Theatre for a fortnight's run in summer 1934.

After this success, Bell invited Eliot and Browne to work on a play to be written by Eliot and presented at the Canterbury Festival the following year, with Browne as director. The title was Murder in the Cathedral and it was this production that established the collaboration between Eliot as poet-playwright and Martin Browne as director which was to last for twenty years. This first production, with Robert Speaight as Becket, was staged in the chapter house at Canterbury and was then taken to London, where it ran for almost a year. It established Browne as the leading director of the "poetic drama" movement, which was then undergoing something of a revival. The American premiere, in New York, followed in February 1938, with Browne himself playing Fourth Tempter.

He succeeded Bishop Bell as President of the Religious Drama Society of Great Britain ("RADIUS"). In March 1939 he directed Eliot's second play, The Family Reunion, in London and in the same year he launched a touring company which he called the "Pilgrim Players", whose programme was dominated by the plays of Eliot and, to a lesser degree, of James Bridie (O. H. Mavor), the Scottish dramatist. These tours continued until 1948.

== Postwar ==
In 1945 Browne took over the 150-seater Mercury Theatre, Notting Hill Gate, and devoted it for the next three years to the production of modern verse plays, with first productions of plays by Christopher Fry, Ronald Duncan, Norman Nicholson and Anne Ridler, all directed by Browne himself. From 1948 to 1957 he was the director of the British Drama League, an organisation devoted to giving assistance to the work of amateur theatres.

In 1951 he was appointed as director for the first major production since the middle of the sixteenth century of the York Mystery Plays, which he directed in the ruins of St Mary's Abbey, York, for the York Festival, part of the celebrations of the Festival of Britain. He undertook further productions of the plays in the same venue in 1954, 1957, and 1966. Meanwhile, he continued his collaboration with T. S. Eliot, directing The Cocktail Party in 1949, The Confidential Clerk in 1953, and The Elder Statesman in 1958.

For six months of each year from 1956 to 1962 he served as visiting professor of religious drama at Union Theological Seminary in the City of New York, and from 1962 to 1965 he was drama adviser to Coventry Cathedral, directing the mediaeval mystery plays there in 1962 and 1964. In 1967 and 1968 he directed at the Yvonne Arnaud Theatre in Guildford, the plays being Murder in the Cathedral, The Family Reunion, Thornton Wilder's Our Town and The Long Christmas Dinner, and the mediaeval morality play, Everyman.

He was appointed CBE in 1952. Following the death of Henzie Raeburn, in 1974 he married Audrey Johnson. He died in the Middlesex Hospital, Westminster, on 27 April 1980, survived by his second wife.

== Books ==
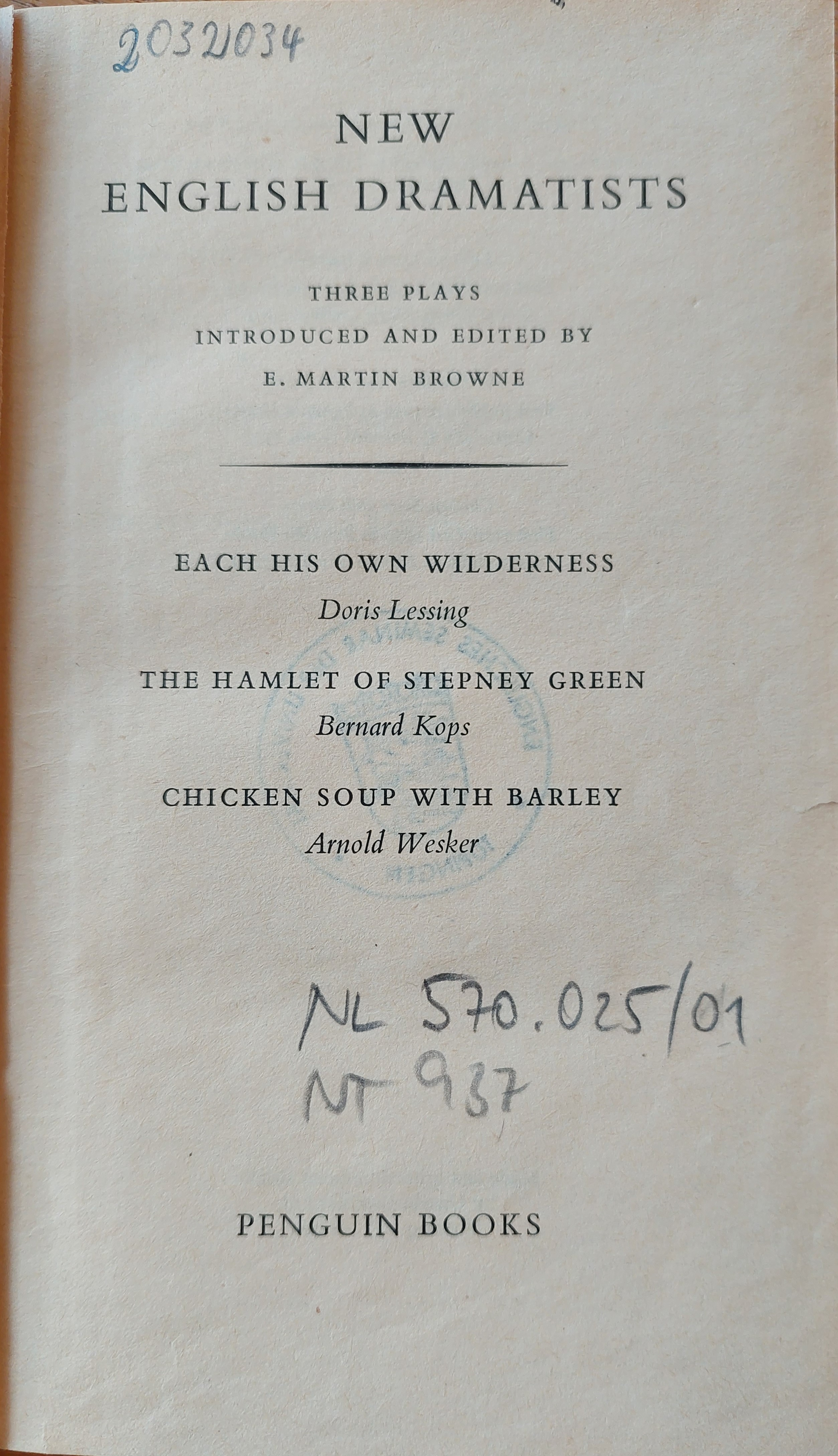
New English Dramatists 1 (1959)

- Henzie Browne; E. Martin Browne (1945). Pilgrim Story; The Pilgrim Players 1939–1943. London: Frederick Muller.
- E. Martin Browne (1969). The Making of T. S. Eliot's Plays. Cambridge University Press.
- E. Martin Browne; Henzie Browne (1981). Two in One. Cambridge University Press.
