= Farah Saleh =

Palestinian dancer and choreographer (born 1985)

- Born: 1985 (age 40–41); Al Yarmouk refugee camp in Syria
- Occupations: Dancer and Choreographer
- Awards: Young Artist of the Year Award (YAYA): 3rd Prize for A Fidayee in Moscow, 2014 Dance prize at Palest'In and Out Festival in Paris for La Même, 2016

Farah Saleh is a Palestinian dancer and choreographer currently based in Scotland, and in 2017 was appointed as Associate Artist at Dance Base, Edinburgh. She has worked in various countries (including Belgium, Denmark, Lebanon and Norway), as well as on projects with Sareyyet Ramallah Dance Company (Palestine) since 2010.

== Life ==
Saleh was born in the Al Yarmouk refugee camp in Syria and started ballet dancing at the age of seven. At the age of eleven she moved to Ramallah with her family but there was no dance school. She tried traditional Arab dance but found it difficult to relate to the staged form of it. She restarted ballet at the age of fourteen and then started contemporary dance with Nicholas Rowe when she was sixteen. In an interview for the book Borders in the Levant. Contemporary Dance and the Internet she argued that self-taught dancers and choreographers are more creative and interesting.

She attended university in Italy and studied Linguistic and Cultural Mediation and Literary Translation as well as continuing her contemporary dance education. Since then she has been involved with various dance groups and projects.

== Work ==
Saleh thinks that her body is an archive. Her work covers many aspects of life and she often tries to engage the audience into action on issues such as protest and dissent, activism on both her part and that of the audience, openness, and the status of women. She believes that art can push forward collective transformations. Some of her work deals directly with the status of Palestinians in the West Bank.

Many of her projects include video installations. A Fidayee Son in Moscow (2015) was originally a video installation, but later adapted to be a live performance. Cells of Illegal Education (2016) was an interactive video installation. It focused on the gestures of civil disobedience during the First Intifada and re-enacts the gestures of students in Birzeit University as they protested. La Même (2016) looked at the representation and the reality of women wearing the hijab or burka in the western and Arab worlds. The piece has two women (one veiled and one unveiled), and she hoped to represent the fact that both had similar fears, hopes and dreams and that the performance proposed solutions to their problems.

== Awards ==
She won the third prize of the Young Artist of the Year Award (YAYA) in 2014 for her installation A Fidayee Son in Moscow.

At the Palest’In and Out Festival in Paris in 2016 she won the dance prize for the duet La Même.

== Selected work ==
- What My Body Can't Remember (2019)
- Brexit Means Brexit (2018)
- Gesturing Refugees (2018)
- La Même (2016)
- Cells of Illegal Education (2016)
- Free Advice (2015)
- A Fidayee Son in Moscow (2014)
