= The Cocktail Party =

Drama by T. S. Eliot

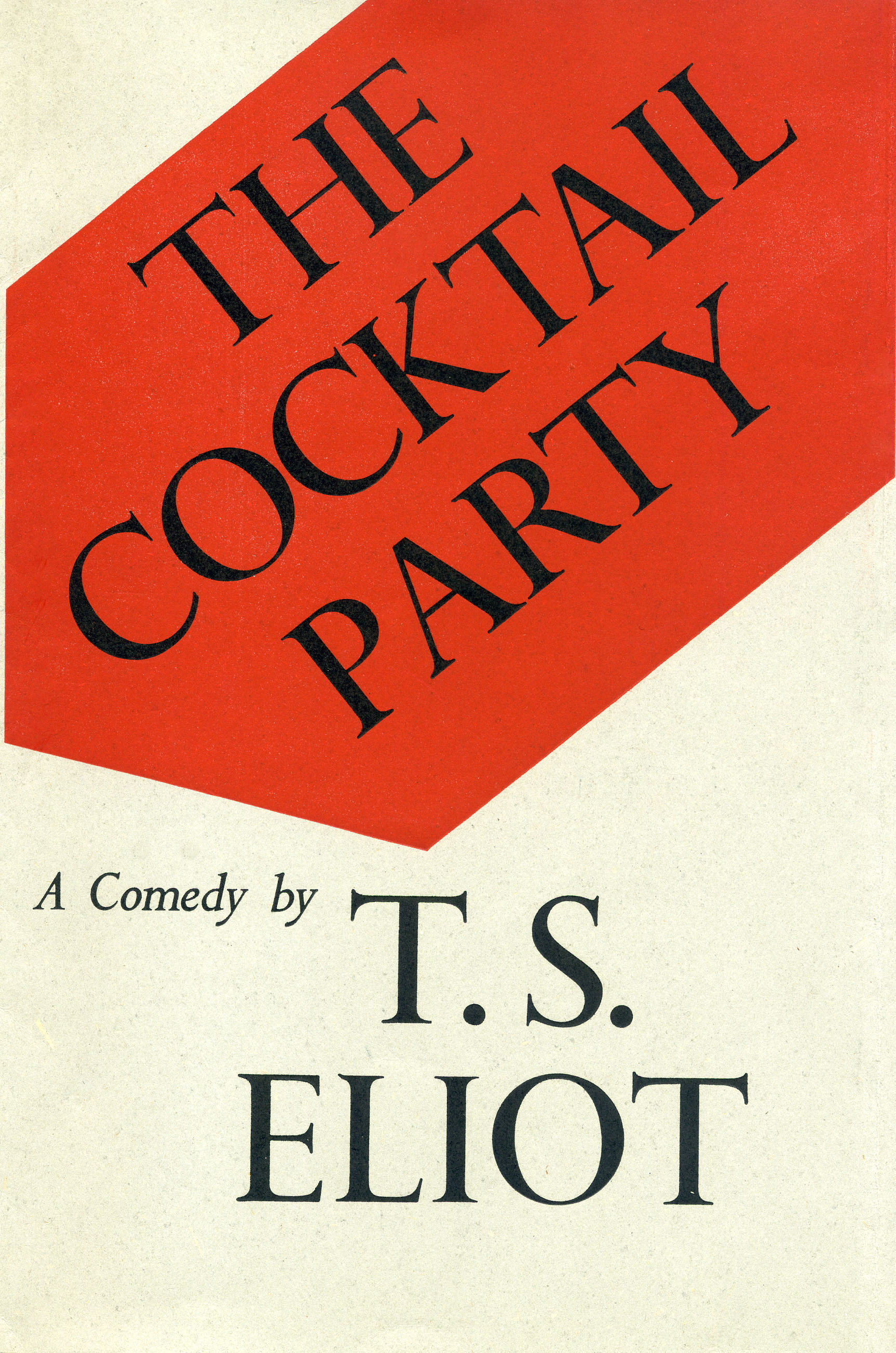
- First edition (Faber & Faber)
- Original language: English
- Written by: T. S. Eliot
- Characters: Edward Chamberlayne; Lavinia Chamberlayne; Celia Coplestone; Sir Henry Harcourt-Reilly; Miss Barraway; Peter Quilpe; Julia Shuttlethwaite; Alexander MacColgie Gibbs
- Setting: London, England

Premiere
- Date: Edinburgh: 22 August 1949; Broadway: 21 January 1950
- Place: Edinburgh Festival; Edinburgh, Scotland; Broadway: Henry Miller's Theatre; New York City, New York

The Cocktail Party is a verse drama in three acts by T. S. Eliot written in 1948 and performed in 1949 at the Edinburgh Festival. It was published in 1950. It was the most popular of Eliot's seven plays in his lifetime, although his 1935 play, Murder in the Cathedral, is better remembered today. It focuses on a troubled married couple who, through the intervention of a mysterious stranger, settle their problems and move on with their lives.

The Cocktail Party was written while Eliot was a visiting scholar at the Institute for Advanced Study in Princeton, New Jersey. In 1950 it had successful runs in London and New York theaters (the Broadway production received the 1950 Tony Award for Best Play).

The play starts out seeming to be a light satire of the traditional British drawing room comedy. As it progresses, it becomes a darker philosophical/psychological treatment of human relations. Like many of Eliot's works, this uses absurdist elements to expose the isolation of the human condition. In another recurring theme of Eliot's plays, the Christian martyrdom of the mistress character is seen as a sacrifice that permits the predominantly secular life of the community to continue. The morality play is based on Euripides' play Alcestis.

In 1951, in the first Theodore Spencer Memorial Lecture at Harvard University Eliot criticised his own plays in the second half of the lecture, explicitly Murder in the Cathedral, The Family Reunion, and The Cocktail Party. The lecture was published as "Poetry and Drama" and later included in Eliot's 1957 collection On Poetry and Poets.

== Synopsis ==
Edward Chamberlayne's wife Lavinia has left him, after five years of marriage, just as they are about to host a cocktail party at their London home. To keep up appearances, he pretends that she has gone to see her aunt. Later, he confesses to a mysterious Unidentified Guest that Lavinia has in fact left him. The Unidentified Guest offers to bring Lavinia back, and does so.

The Unidentified Guest turns out to be the "psychiatrist" Sir Henry Harcourt-Reilly. Edward and Lavinia both consult with Reilly at his office. He tells them that they have been deceiving themselves and must face life's realities: their life together, though hollow and superficial, is preferable to life apart. This message is difficult for the play's third main character, Celia, to accept. She, at the psychiatrist's urging, sets out upon the path to sainthood, embracing a life of greater honesty and salvation that leads her to become a Christian mystic fated to endure martyrdom on the fictional Eastern island of Kinkanja. Following Celia's consultation with the "psychiatrist", it is revealed that the characters Reilly, Julia, and Alex are not, in fact, humans but angelic beings dedicated to the transhumanisation of the human soul: two paths lie open to humans: the first being the way of companionable self-deception ('the hearth') embraced by the vast majority – as epitomised in the relationship between Edward and Lavinia, and the second that of the saint, embraced by a gifted — or burdened — few.

Two years later, Edward and Lavinia, now better adjusted, host another cocktail party, at which they are told by Alex of Celia's martyrdom, for which they confess feeling a measure of guilt at what they consider the tragic waste of her life, but which Reilly considers a triumph. It is further hinted that Peter Quilpe is another of the rare individuals destined, like Celia, to follow the arduous but fulfilling path to sainthood/enlightenment.

== Quotations ==
(The self-deception of 'the hearth' contrasted with the terrors of the path to sainthood:)

CELIA
...everyone's alone - or so it seems to me.
They make noises, and think they are talking to each other;
They make faces, and think they understand each other...

Act II

CELIA
But even if I find my way out of the forest
I shall be left with the inconsolable memory
Of the I went into the forest to find
And never found, and which was not there
And perhaps is not anywhere? But if not anywhere,
Why do I feel guilty at not having found it?

Act II

ALEX
Watch over her in the desert.
Watch over her in the mountain.
Watch over her in the labyrinth.
Watch over her by the quicksand.

JULIA
Protect her from the Voices
Protect her from the Visions
Protect her in the tumult
Protect her in the silence

Act II

== Characters ==
- Edward Chamberlayne
- Lavinia Chamberlayne
- Celia Coplestone, with whom Edward has had an affair
- Peter Quilpe, who yearns for Celia
- Julia Shuttlethwaite
- Alexander MacColgie Gibbs
- An Unidentified Guest, later identified as Sir Henry Harcourt-Reilly
- A Nurse-Secretary (secretary to Sir Henry)

== Productions ==
After its debut at the Edinburgh Festival in 1949 with Alec Guinness in the role of the unidentified guest, produced by Henry Sherek and directed by E. Martin Browne, The Cocktail Party premiered on Broadway on 21 January 1950 at the Henry Miller's Theatre and ran for 409 performances. Produced by Gilbert Miller and directed by E. Martin Browne, the production starred Guinness as the mysterious stranger. It received the 1950 Tony Award for Best Play. The play also ran in London with Rex Harrison as the unidentified guest.

A revival opened on 7 October 1968 at the Lyceum Theatre and ran for 44 performances. The Chamberlaynes were played by Brian Bedford and Frances Sternhagen, with Sydney Walker as the mysterious stranger.

Guinness returned to the role of the unidentified guest at the Chichester Festival Theatre under his own direction in 1968, taking the production to London later in the year. In the spring of 2010, the New York-based Off-Broadway company The Actors Company Theatre (TACT) presented the play.

== Awards and nominations ==
=== Original Broadway production ===
Year	Award	Category	Nominee	Result
1950	Tony Award	Best Play		Won
