= William Wordsworth (composer) =

English composer (1908–1988)

William Brocklesby Wordsworth (17 December 1908 – 10 March 1988) was an English composer. His works, which number over 100, were tonal and romantic in style in the widest sense and include eight symphonies and six string quartets.

== Life ==
Wordsworth was born in London, the son of a clergyman and a descendant of the poet Wordsworth's brother. He studied harmony and counterpoint under George Oldroyd at St Michael's Church, Croydon from 1921 to 1931, continuing his study with Donald Tovey at Edinburgh University from 1934 to 1936. In anticipation of conscientious objection, he was an active member of the Peace Pledge Union, and voluntarily began work on the land in 1939, a role that was later made a condition of exemption from military service by his tribunal.

He lived in Hindhead, Surrey until 1961 when he moved to Inverness-shire; in 1966, he helped found the Scottish Composers' Guild. He also helped form the Society of Scottish Composers.

Wordsworth died at Kingussie in Scotland, aged 79.

== Compositions ==
Wordsworth's first acknowledged and published piece was the Three Hymn Preludes for organ, Op. 1 of 1932. The following year his Phantasy Sonata for violin and piano, Op. 3, attracted the attention of Donald Tovey, and led to his accepting Wordsworth as a pupil. The first large scale works appeared in the late 1930s and he started to gain critical attention during the war years, when the String Quartet No. 1, Op. 16 won the Clements Memorial Prize in 1941.

Described by Michael Kennedy as having "the overtones of war or spiritual strife", the Symphony No. 1 was composed in 1944 and premiered two years later during a studio recording in Manchester by the BBC Northern Orchestra conducted by Julius Harrison. Although the BBC Scottish Symphony Orchestra performed it for a modern studio recording in 1968, the Symphony has not yet received a public performance. Another large work of the wartime period, the oratorio Dies Domini, Op. 18, for three soloists, chorus and large orchestra, was praised by Vaughan Williams, but is still awaiting its first performance.

The fifteen years after the war were the most productive for Wordsworth, and also the time when he received the most recognition. There were four more symphonies (1948, 1951, 1953 and 1960), three of the six string quartets, the Piano Concerto (1948) and the Violin Concerto (1956), as well as large scale works for chorus and orchestra such as A Song of Praise (1956) and The Peasants' Revolt (1957).

But during the 1950s and 1960s, while still at the height of his powers, Wordsworth's music began to fall out of favour, separate as it was from the prevailing trends in European music. He set up his own publishing company, Speyside, to provide an outlet for his music. The Cello Concerto (1962) is a work of symphonic proportions, written in a style that sits somewhere between Shostakovich and Bloch. Written in 1962–3, it had to wait until 1975 for its first performance, during a BBC broadcast on 20 January 1975.

After the death of his elder son Tim in 1971 at the age of 23, Wordsworth composed two elegiac works, Adonais, Op. 97 (1974) for five mixed voices, piano, cymbals and bells (setting Shelley), and the Symphony No. 6, Elegiaca, for mezzo-soprano, baritone, chorus and orchestra, Op. 102 (1977, words by Shelley, John Donne and Edna St. Vincent Millay). When his wife Frieda died in 1982 he produced the Elegy for Frieda for strings, Op. 111a (1984). His last completed work, a BBC commission, was the two-movement Symphony No. 8 Pax Hominibus, Op.117 (1986), the subtitle reflecting the composer's long-standing involvement in the peace movement. It was broadcast on 14 November 1986.

== Works ==
Orchestral

- Symphony No. 1 in F minor, Op. 23 (1944)
- Symphony No. 2 in D, Op. 34 (1947–48)
- Symphony No. 3 in C major, Op. 48 (1950–51)
- Symphony No. 4 in E-flat, Op. 54 (1953)
- Symphony No. 5 in A minor, Op. 68 (1959–60)
- Symphony No. 6, Elegiaca Op. 102 (1977)
- Symphony No. 7, Cosmos, Op. 107 (1980)
- Symphony No. 8, Pax Hominibus (1986)
- Three Pastoral Sketches, Op. 10 (1937)
- Theme and Variations (1941)
- Symphonic Study for strings, Op. 53
- Divertimento for orchestra in D, Op. 58 (1954)
- Sinfonietta for chamber orchestra, Op. 62 (1958)
- Variations on a Scottish Theme, Op. 72 (1962)
- A Highland Overture, Op. 76 (1964)
- Jubilation: A Festivity for Orchestra, Op. 78 (1965)
- Two Scottish Sketches for small orchestra, Op. 87 (1967)
- Conflict, overture for orchestra, Op. 86 (1968)
- Valediction for orchestra, Op. 82a (1969)
- A Spring Festival Overture, Op. 90 (1970)
- Confluence, symphonic variations for orchestra, Op. 100 (1976)
- Excelsior - A Memory of Walks on the High Hills of Scotland, for strings, Op. 112 (1983)
- Elegy for Frieda for strings, Op. 111a (1984)

Concertos

- Piano Concerto in D minor, Op. 28 (1946)
- Violin Concerto in A major, Op. 60 (1955)
- Cello Concerto, Op. 73 (1962)

Chamber

- String Quartet No. 1 (1941)
- String Quartet No. 2 (1944)
- String Quartet No. 3 (1947)
- String Quartet No. 4 (1950)
- String Quartet No. 5 (1957)
- String Quartet No. 6 (1964)
- Intermezzo for viola and piano (1935)
- Nocturne, Op. 29, for cello and piano (1946)
- Trio in G minor for violin, viola and cello (1948)
- Scherzo, Op. 42, for cello and piano (1949)
- Clarinet Quintet (1952)
- Sonata No. 2 in G minor, Op. 66, for cello and piano (1959)
- Sonata for cello solo (1961)
- Sonatina in D for viola and piano (or guitar), Op. 71 (1961)
- Three Pieces (Prelude, Elegy and Scherzo) for viola and piano, Op. 93 (1972)
- Conversation Piece for viola and guitar, Op. 113 (1983)

Vocal

- The Houseless Dead, for tenor, chorus and orchestra, Op. 14 (1939)
- Four Lyrics for tenor and string quartet, Op. 17 (1941)
- Dies Domini, oratorio for soloists, chorus, and orchestra (1942-1944)
- Hymn of Dedication for chorus and orchestra (1945)
- The image, vocal setting for high voice to the poem by Richard Hughes (before 1947)
- Lucifer Yields, dramatic cantata for tenor, baritone, speaker, chorus and orchestra, Op. 40 (1949)
- Three Wordsworth Songs for high voice and string quartet, Op. 45 (1950)
- A Vision: Songs of Innocence and Experience, for female voices, strings and piano, Op. 46 (1950)
- In No Strange Land, for piano, strings and choir (1951)
- A Song of Praise (1956)
- The Peasants' Revolt (1957)
- The Solitary Reaper for mixed chorus, viola and piano (setting William Wordsworth)
- Four Songs of Shakespeare for high voice, viola and piano, Op. 103 (1977)
- The Cambridge Hymnal Cambridge University Press (1967) Wordsworth contributed five hymns.

Piano solo

- Three Pieces for Piano (early 1930s)
- Sonata, D minor, Op. 13 (1939)
- Cheesecombe Suite, Op. 27 (1945)
- Ballade, Op. 41 (1949)
- Valediction, Op. 82 (1967)
