= Symphony No. 5 (MacMillan) =

2019 composition by James MacMillan

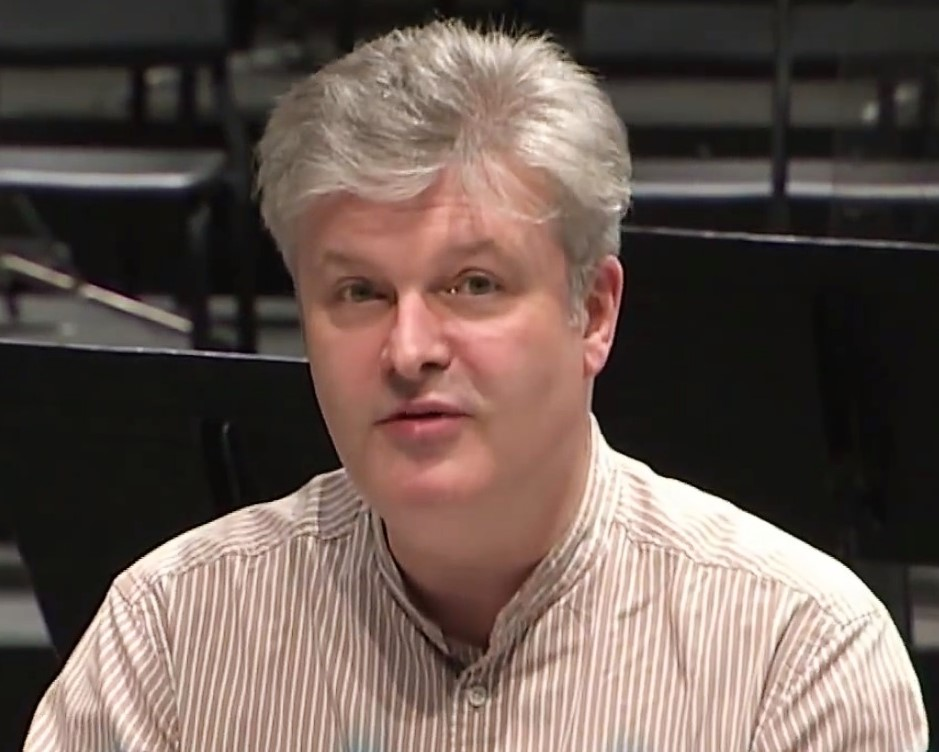
James MacMillan in 2012

Symphony No. 5 Le grand Inconnu (The Great Unknown) is a choral symphony by the Scottish composer James MacMillan. The work was commissioned by the Genesis Foundation. It was first performed by the U.K.-based choir The Sixteen, the Genesis Sixteen chamber choir, and Scottish Chamber Orchestra conducted by Harry Christophers in Usher Hall, Edinburgh, on 17 August 2019.

== Composition ==
The work's title "Le grand Inconnu" is a French phrase referring to the mystery of the Holy Spirit, which MacMillan chose as the subject of the symphony. In the score program notes, the composer wrote, "There are, of course, many great motets from the past which set texts devoted to the Third Person of the Trinity, and in the 20th century the one piece which sticks out is the setting of the Veni Creator Spiritus in the first movement of Mahler's Eighth Symphony. But it still feels like relatively unexplored territory, so perhaps now is the time to explore this mysterious avenue, where concepts of creativity and spirituality overlap?" MacMillan described the symphony as "not a liturgical work," but "an attempt to explore the mystery discussed above in music for two choirs and orchestra."

The score incorporates a number of sacred texts from English, Hebrew, Ancient Greek, and Latin, in addition to calling on the vocalists to perform audible breathing, whispering, and murmuring. The end of the second movement also contains a 20-part motet in the chorus, which references Spem in alium by the Renaissance composer Thomas Tallis.

=== Form ===
The symphony has a duration of roughly an hour in performance and is cast in three movements, whose titles correspond, respectively, to wind, water, and fire:

1. Ruah (Hebrew for "wind")
2. Zao (Ancient Greek for "living water")
3. Igne vel Igne (Latin for "fire or fire")

=== Instrumentation ===
The work is scored for chamber choir, chorus, and a large orchestra consisting of two flutes, two oboes, two clarinets, two bassoons (2nd doubling contrabassoon), four horns, two trumpets, three trombones, tuba, timpani, two percussionists, harp, piano, and strings.

== Reception ==
The symphony garnered a highly favorable response from audiences and music critics alike. Reviewing the world premiere, Rowena Smith of The Guardian said of the symphony, "It's heady stuff brimming with ideas, the result of what MacMillan describes as a compositional process led by 'stream of consciousness'." She continued, "There are many striking sections, particularly the 20-voice motet that ends the second movement, MacMillan's homage to Tallis's mighty Spem in Alium. MacMillan's writing for voices is utterly assured – a reminder that this has become his medium in recent years. It's difficult, however, to make sense of the greater whole on first hearing. But this didn't stop it from earning a rapturous reception at the Edinburgh premiere, or a standing ovation for its composer." Richard Bratby of The Spectator similarly reflected, "What it says is something with which I'm still grappling, three days after witnessing a sizeable Usher Hall audience rise, cheering, to its feet." He added, "Well, putting it crudely, the whole symphony pulls quietly towards consonance and a vast, cumulative sense of affirmation. In the moment, and for a while afterwards, that choked me up, and I don't think it was just me. Why does it feel so moving when a piece of contemporary music actually delivers on its promise? You don’t even need the words, or the faith, though MacMillan probably couldn't have achieved what he has without them." Richard Fairman of the Financial Times wrote, "There is a palpable sense of MacMillan venturing into untried areas, as he aims to give voice to the mystery of the Holy Spirit. Breathing noises, whisperings and murmurings combine in a panoply of sounds."

Despite praising many elements of the symphony, Ken Walton of The Scotsman wrote, "No mistaking the scorching emotional heat that roused this audience instantly to its feet. But is there too much going on, symphonic cohesion stretched to near-bursting point? Despite this electrifying performance, I still find myself asking that question."
