= Tom Littler =

British theatre director

Tom Littler is a British theatre director and the Artistic Director of the Orange Tree Theatre in Richmond, London. He was the founder of theatre company Primavera Productions, a former Associate Director of Theatre503 formerly Artistic Director of Jermyn Street Theatre, which he turned into a producing theatre.

His West End credits include Stephen Sondheim's Saturday Night (for Primavera) which starred Helena Blackman, the runner-up of How Do You Solve a Problem Like Maria. Littler was also resident director of the 2009 revival of A Little Night Music at the Garrick Theatre and Menier Chocolate Factory. Littler directed the premiere of Dances of Death by Howard Brenton, a new version of The Dance of Death by August Strindberg at the Gate Theatre (London) in 2013, starring Michael Pennington. He also directed the premieres of Brenton's biographical play about August Strindberg, The Blinding Light, at Jermyn Street Theatre, and his new version of Miss Julie.

Littler was a regular Associate Director of the Peter Hall Season at the Theatre Royal, Bath, working with Sir Peter Hall on productions including Little Nell by Simon Gray, A Doll's House with Catherine McCormack, Born in the Gardens by Peter Nichols, and The Browning Version by Terence Rattigan.

Littler succeeded Paul Miller as Artistic Director of the Orange Tree Theatre in December 2022. In November 2026, the Orange Tree Theatre announced that Littler would be stepping down from his role to take up the post of chief executive and artistic director at the Cambridge Arts Theatre in June 2027.
