= The Elder Statesman (play) =

Play by T.S. Eliot

The Elder Statesman is a play in verse by T. S. Eliot first performed in 1958 and published in 1959.

== Synopsis ==
When the play opens, the setting is that of Lord Claverton's drawing room. Lord Claverton is a man of distinction, who is well known and well respected in society, where he exerts considerable influence. In the play's first production at The 1958 Edinburgh Festival this character bore a strong visual resemblance to the then Premier, Harold Macmillan. As the play opens, we see Claverton's daughter Monica, bantering with her beau, Charles Hemington. From their conversation, it becomes evident that Lord Claverton is fiercely possessive of Monica - a fact that Charles grudges. Through the course of the play, we see that Claverton has been forced to retire for medical reasons. He is hounded by revelations from his past - a man (Gomez), who as a student he led into bad company, a singer (Mrs. Carghill), with whom he had an affair and who was bought off by his father. These people unexpectedly make a comeback in Claverton's life, and bring with them all the memories that Claverton has conveniently chosen to forget or overlook. Claverton and Monica's first impression is that Gomez and Mrs. Carghill have returned to claim money from the wealthy Claverton. But it is made abundantly clear to the reader that Gomez and Mrs. Carghill are well enough off on their own account, and have not come back to blackmail Claverton for his money. They only want to spend their time with Claverton. Eliot's underlying message is that these two people are the twin agents of conscience that have come back to constantly remind Claverton of his guilt, of how his public image does not match the real man underneath it. Back in his college days, Claverton had a hit and run incident, a fact which Gomez is privy to. As for Mrs. Carghill, she was the love of Claverton's life but she was bought off by Claverton's disapproving father. As a result, Claverton could not make good his promise of marrying Mrs. Carghill. Gomez, who has made a fortune since then and Mrs. Carghill, who is now a wealthy widow, have both come back to Claverton's life as agents of Eliot's message.

As the play progresses, we see that Gomez manages to lure away Claverton's son Michael, according to whom his father never understood him. It is only Monica, who stands beside her father, offering all the support he needs. She is indeed the spiritual guide who brings Claverton to the light of self-knowledge. It is only by shamefully confessing to Monica that her father is able to gain salvation. Claverton confesses that he never told her about the past as he always wanted Monica and Michael to admire him. Monica assures him that her admiration for her father is irrespective of his past. As for Michael, he is given a farewell so that he may go with Gomez and chart his own destiny. They are both hopeful that Michael will either be successful in his pursuits, or will return home eventually, like the prodigal son.

After his confession to Monica and her re-assurance to her father, Claverton expresses his desire to go for a walk. It doesn't take the reader too long to realize that Claverton dies off-stage, leaving Monica to Charles. The couple will together lead and be led towards the goal of spirituality and illumination.

== Production ==
The first run was produced by Henry Sherek and directed by E. Martin Browne, This first production was part of the Edinburgh Festival 1958.
