= Musicians at the Edinburgh International Festival, 1967–1976 =

Musicians at the Edinburgh International Festival, 1967–1976 lists the major artists who appeared during the third decade of the Edinburgh International Festival.

Orchestras and groups from Scotland, Britain, Austria, France, Germany, Italy, the Netherlands, Sweden, Czechoslovakia, Poland, Hungary, Israel, the Soviet Union and the US and Australia were all invited to perform.

The Scottish National Orchestra, now known as the Royal Scottish National Orchestra, BBC Scottish Radio Orchestra and BBC Scottish Orchestra were present, joined by the London Symphony Orchestra, Philharmonia Orchestra, London Philharmonic Orchestra, Royal Philharmonic Orchestra, BBC Symphony Orchestra, English Chamber Orchestra, Academy of St Martin in the Fields, London Sinfonietta and others.

European, American and Australian orchestras included the Berlin Philharmonic, Bavarian Radio Symphony Orchestra, Leipzig Gewandhaus Orchestra, Vienna Philharmonic, Vienna Symphony Orchestra, Orchestre National de France, Orchestre de Paris, Concertgebouw Orchestra, Netherlands Chamber Orchestra, Stockholm Philharmonic Orchestra, Czech Philharmonic, Cracow Philharmonic Orchestra, Israel Philharmonic Orchestra, State Orchestra of the USSR, New York Philharmonic, Chicago Symphony Orchestra, Cleveland Orchestra and the Sydney Symphony Orchestra.

Each orchestra or group came with celebrated conductors and soloists, many of whom are still famous today as their recordings remain the standard by which contemporary musicians are judged.

== 1967 ==
| Orchestras | Conductors | Soloists | Singers | Ensembles and choral groups |
|---|---|---|---|---|
| Cleveland Orchestra, BBC Scottish Symphony Orchestra, Netherlands Chamber Orchestra, Scottish National Orchestra, BBC Symphony Orchestra, London Symphony Orchestra, Berlin Philharmonic Orchestra | George Szell, James Loughran, Carlo Maria Giulini, Szymon Goldberg, Alexander Gibson, Colin Davis, Pierre Boulez, István Kertész, Claudio Abbado, Herbert von Karajan, Eliot Forbes | Clifford Curzon, Leonid Kogan, Pierre Fournier, Claudio Arrau, Adriaan Bonsel, Rafael Orozco, Stephen Bishop, Martha Argerich, Szymon Goldberg, George Malcolm, Frans Brüggen, Elaine Shaffer, Janny van Wering, Koos Verheul, André Tchaikovsky, Naum Walter, Herrick Bunney, Robert Sutherland | Janet Baker, Richard Lewis, Günther Reich, Yvonne Minton, Lajos Kozma, Shirley Verrett, Loren Driscoll, Spiro Malas, Edda Moser, Helen Donath, Josephine Veasey, Robert Tear, Gérard Souzay, Heather Harper, Gerald English, Irmgard Stadler, Robert El Hage, Olga Szönyi, Andras Farrago, Giovanni Fojani, Christopher Keyte | Smetana Quartet, Harvard Glee Club, Radcliffe Choral Society, Berlin Philharmonic Octet. Scottish Festival Chorus |

== 1968 ==
| Orchestras | Conductors | Soloists | Singers | Ensembles and choral groups |
|---|---|---|---|---|
| London Symphony Orchestra, Scottish National Orchestra, English Chamber Orchestra, State Orchestra of the USSR, New Philharmonia Orchestra, Symphony Orchestra of the Bavarian Radio, BBC Scottish Symphony Orchestra | István Kertész, Pierre Boulez, Alexander Gibson, Daniel Barenboim, Evgenij Svetlanov, David Oistrakh, Claudio Abbado, Otto Klemperer, Carlo Maria Giulini, Benjamin Britten, Rafael Kubelík, James Loughran, Lawrence Leonard, Joseph Horrowitz | Yehudi Menuhin, Jacqueline du Pré, Hephzibah Menuhin, Gervase de Peyer, Daniel Barenboim, Mstislav Rostropovich, David Oistrakh, Jörg Demus, Isaac Stern, Leonard Rose, Eugene Istomin, Ingrid Haebler, Sviatoslav Richter, Peter Frankl, Benjamin Britten, Geoffrey Parsons, Peter Williams, Semyon Kruchin, J Edward Merrett | Elly Ameling, Helen Watts, Peter Pears, Helga Pilarczyk, Dietrich Fischer-Dieskau, Anne Pashley, David Hughes, Galina Vishnevskaya, Phyllis Curtin, Richard Lewis, Thomas Hemsley, John Shaw, April Cantelo, Eric Shilling, Sybil Michelow, Duncan Robertson | Melos Ensemble, John Alldis Choir, Amadeus Quartet, Scottish Opera Chorus |

== 1969 ==
| Orchestras | Conductors | Soloists | Singers | Ensembles and choral groups |
|---|---|---|---|---|
| London Sinfonietta, Scottish National Orchestra, BBC Scottish Radio Orchestra, London Symphony Orchestra, BBC Scottish Symphony Orchestra, Czech Philharmonic Orchestra, New Philharmonia Orchestra, Scottish National Chamber Orchestra | Alexander Goehr, David Atherton, Alexander Gibson, Iain Sutherland, Hans Schmidt-Isserstedt, Claudio Abbado, James Loughran, Vaclav Neumann, Lorin Maazel, John Barbirolli, Daniel Barenboim, Carlo Maria Giulini, Alberto Erede, | Stephen Bishop, Itzhak Perlman, Martha Argerich, Severino Gazzelloni, Nikita Magaloff, Peter Schidlof, Geoffrey Parsons, Nathan Milstein, Annie Fischer, Rudolf Firkusny, Roberto Michelucci, Claudio Arrau, Misha Dichter, Edoardo Müller, Bruno Canino, Raymond Leppard, Szymon Goldberg, Angus Cameron, George Mcllwham, Lucio Buccarella, Maria Teresa Garatti, Arnaldo Apostoli, Aldo Bennici, Warren Wilson, Hans Hildorf, Colin Bradbury | Cathy Berberian, Philip Langridge, Joseph Rouleau, John Mitchinson, Catherine Gayer, Hermann Prey, April Cantelo, Janet Baker, Ángeles Gulín Dominguez, Nicolai Gedda, Raffaele Arié, Shirley Verrett, Renato Capecchi, Teresa Cahill, Alexander Oliver, Yvonne Fuller, Gloria Jennings, Michael Rippon, Patricia MacMahon, Ronald Morrison | I Musici, Bartók String Quartet, Aeolian Quartet, Music Theatre Ensemble, Edinburgh Festival Chorus, Trio di Trieste, Sestetto Italiano Luca Marenzio |

== 1970 ==
| Orchestras | Conductors | Soloists | Singers | Ensembles and choral groups |
|---|---|---|---|---|
| New Philharmonia Orchestra, BBC Symphony Orchestra, Academy of St Martin in the Fields, Scottish National Orchestra, Stockholm Philharmonic Orchestra, London Philharmonic Orchestra, Concertgebouw Orchestra, BBC Scottish Symphony Orchestra | John Barbirolli, Edward Downes, Carlo Maria Giulini, Daniel Barenboim, Colin Davis, Neville Marriner, Hans Werner Henze, Leo Brouwer, Alexander Gibson, Antal Doráti, Bernard Haitink, Eugen Jochum, James Loughran | Ruggiero Ricci, Radu Lupu, Heinz Holliger, Peter Frankl, Karlheinz Zoeller, Norbert Brainin, Peter Schidlof, Peter Williams, Stomu Yamash'ta, Clifford Curzon, Stephen Bishop, Alfred Brendel, Géza Anda, Josef Suk, Daniel Barenboim, Jacqueline du Pre, György Pauk, Christiane Jaccottet, Eva Bernáthová | Heather Harper, Janet Baker, Raimund Herincx, Helga Dernesch, Plácido Domingo, Franz Crass, Dietrich Fischer-Dieskau, William Pearson, Elisabeth Söderström, Birgit Finnilä, Vilém Přibyl, Sven Olof Eliasson, Arne Tyrén, Ronald Dowd | Amadeus Quartet, Netherlands Wind Ensemble, New York Chamber Soloists, Purcell Consort of Voices, Edinburgh Quartet, Edinburgh Festival Chorus, Stockholm Philharmonic Choir |

== 1971 ==
| Orchestras | Conductors | Soloists | Singers | Ensembles and choral groups |
|---|---|---|---|---|
| Scottish National Orchestra, London Philharmonic Orchestra, National Youth Orchestra of Great Britain, Israel Philharmonic Orchestra, London Symphony Orchestra, Chicago Symphony Orchestra, BBC Scottish Symphony Orchestra, BBC Scottish Radio Orchestra | Alexander Gibson, Luciano Berio, Bernard Haitink, Josef Krips, Pierre Boulez, Zubin Mehta, André Previn, Claudio Abbado, Georg Solti, Carlo Maria Giulini, James Loughran, Iain Sutherland, David Munrow, | Yehudi Menuhin, André Watts, Pierre Fournier, Wolfgang Schneiderhan, Walter Klien, Daniel Barenboim, Pinchas Zukerman, Gervase de Peyer, Henryk Szeryng, Michael Roll, Vladimir Ashkenazy, Rafael Orozco, Radu Lupu, Anthony Rooley, Claude Frank, Ravi Shankar, Alla Rakha, Peter Williams, James Lockhart, Peter Gellhorn, Peter Katin, Valda Aveling, Felix Lavilla, Alan Hacker, Tony Coe, Paul Crossley, Tristan Fry, Barry Tuckwell, Margaret Kitchin, Enzo Ferrari, Francis Christou, Michael Block, Peter Lukas Graf, Herrick Bunney, Miguel Zanetti, Jean Fonda, David Willison, | John Shirley-Quirk, Victoria de los Ángeles, Margaret Price, Janet Baker, Helga Dernesch, Martha Schlamme, Benjamin Luxon, Martyn Hill, Jill Gomez, Teresa Berganza, Jane Manning, Gerald English, Renato Capecchi, Ronald Morrison, William McCue | The Swingle Singers, LaSalle Quartet, Early Music Consort of London, Trio Italiano, The English Consort of Viols, Edinburgh Festival Chorus |

== 1972 ==
| Orchestras | Conductors | Soloists | Singers | Ensembles and choral groups |
|---|---|---|---|---|
| Royal Philharmonic Orchestra, English Chamber Orchestra, Scottish National Orchestra, Berlin Philharmonic Orchestra, Cracow Philharmonic Orchestra, BBC Scottish Symphony Orchestra | Adrian Boult, Rudolf Kempe, Lawrence Foster, Daniel Barenboim, Uri Segal, Alexander Gibson, Witold Lutosławski, Herbert von Karajan, Jerzy Katlewicz, Christopher Seaman, David Atherton, Peter Maxwell Davies, Leonard Friedman | Shura Cherkassky, Alfred Brendel, Wanda Wilkomirska, Pinchas Zukerman, Neil Black, Joseph Kalichstein, Tamás Vásáry, Siegfried Palm, Christian Ferras, Paul Zukofsky, Helen Schnabel, Karl Ulrich Schnabel, Julian Bream, Irwin Gage, Margaret Kitchin, Aribert Reimann, Daniel Barenboim, Stephen Pruslin, Alan Hacker, Terence Weil, Karlheinz Zoeller, Lothar Koch, Michel Schwalbé, Wolfgang Boettcher, Christian Ferras, Geoffrey Parsons, Kenneth Essex, Siegbert Ueberschaer, Waldemar Döling, Jean-Claude Ambrosini | Felicity Palmer, John Carol Case, Jessye Norman, Christa Ludwig, René Kollo, Stefania Woytowicz, Bernard Ładysz, Peter Lagger, Catherine Gayer, Dietrich Fischer-Dieskau, William Pearson, Anne Howells, Andrezej Hiolski, Krystina Szczepanska, Kasimierz Pustelak | The King's Singers, Melos Ensemble, The Fires of London, Aeolian Quartet, Berlin Philharmonic Soloists, The Saltire Vocal Quartet, Fistulatores et Tubicinatores Varsoviensis, Scottish Baroque Ensemble |

== 1973 ==
| Orchestras | Conductors | Soloists | Singers | Ensembles and choral groups |
|---|---|---|---|---|
| Scottish National Orchestra, English Chamber Orchestra, London Symphony Orchestra, BBC Symphony Orchestra, BBC Scottish Symphony Orchestra, New Philharmonia Orchestra, Orchestre de Paris | Alexander Gibson, Daniel Barenboim, André Previn, Carlo Maria Giulini, Leonard Bernstein, Pierre Boulez, Christopher Seaman, Zubin Mehta, Riccardo Muti, Georg Solti, Gilbert Amy, Clytus Gottwald | Henryk Szeryng, Annie Fischer, Leon Fleisher, Radu Lupu, Heinz Holliger, Ida Haendel, Martha Argerich, Isaac Stern, Murray Perahia, Bernhard Klee, Peter Frankl, György Pauk, Ralph Kirshbaum, Peter Williams, Jean-Rodolphe Kars, Alan Hacker, Anthony Goldstone, Heinz Holliger, Ursula Holliger, Jürg Wyttenbach, Daniel Barenboim, Bruno Canino | Edith Mathis, Birgit Finnilä, Peter Pears, Wolfgang Brendel, Sheila Armstrong, Anthony Rolfe Johnson, Thomas Allen, Janet Baker, Jane Berbié, Christiane Eda-Pierre, Régine Crespin, Philip Langridge, Cathy Berberian, Delia Wallis, | Gabrieli Quartet, Les Percussions de Strasbourg, The King's Singers, Amadeus Quartet, ECO Wind Ensemble, Holliger Ensemble, Les Clavecinistes français, Stuttgart Schola Cantorum, Edinburgh Festival Chorus |

== 1974 ==
| Orchestras | Conductors | Soloists | Singers | Ensembles and choral groups |
|---|---|---|---|---|
| Scottish National Orchestra, London Philharmonic Orchestra, English Chamber Orchestra, BBC Scottish Symphony Orchestra, Vienna Symphony Orchestra, London Sinfonietta, Sydney Symphony Orchestra, | Alexander Gibson, Michael Tippett, Thea Musgrave, Carlo Maria Giulini, Bernard Haitink, Daniel Barenboim, Andrew Davis, Christopher Seaman, Goffredo Petrassi, David Atherton, Ernst Krenek, Charles Mackerras, Willem van Otterloo, Elgar Howarth | Clifford Curzon, John Ogdon, Barry Tuckwell, Jean-Bernard Pommier, Richard Goode, Szymon Goldberg, Moura Lympany, Alexis Weissenberg, John Williams, Roger Woodward, Richard Rodney Bennett, Irwin Gage, Radu Lupu, Aribert Reimann, Ernst Krenek, Daryl Runswick | Martina Arroyo, Fiorenza Cossotto, Luciano Pavarotti, Raffaele Arié, Anja Silja, Heather Harper, Helen Watts, Luigi Alva, Peter Lagger, Dietrich Fischer-Dieskau, Mary Thomas, Derek Hammond-Stroud, Catherine Gayer, Jessye Norman, Cleo Laine, Margaret Kingsley | Nash Ensemble, The King's Singers, Trio di Milano, The Matrix, Tuckwell Wind Quintet, New Music Group of Scotland, Tel Aviv String Quartet, Edinburgh Festival Chorus |

== 1975 ==
| Orchestras | Conductors | Soloists | Singers | Ensembles and choral groups |
|---|---|---|---|---|
| Scottish National Orchestra, London Philharmonic Orchestra, English Chamber Orchestra, New York Philharmonic Orchestra, Israel Philharmonic Orchestra, London Symphony Orchestra, Orchestre National de France | Alexander Gibson, Carlo Maria Giulini, Mstislav Rostropovich, Pierre Boulez, Zubin Mehta, Claudio Abbado, André Previn, Leonard Bernstein, Carl Pini | Claudio Arrau, Maurice André, Itzhak Perlman, Alfred Brendel, Daniel Benyamini, Rafael Orozco, Kyung Wha Chung, Boris Belkin, Aribert Reimann, Bruno Canino, Mstislav Rostropovich, David Willison, Antonio Ballista | Teresa Berganza, Gundula Janowitz, Helen Donath, Anthony Rolfe-Johnson, Galina Vishnevskaya, Janet Baker, Sheila Armstrong, Robert Tear, John Shirley-Quirk, Marilyn Horne, Catherine Gayer, Anthony Rolfe Johnson, John York Skinner, Alfreda Hodgson, Marius Rintzler | The Consort of Musicke, Tokyo Quartet, Amadeus Quartet, Allegri Quartet, Vesuvius Ensemble, Pleeth, Wallfisch, de Peyer Trio, New Music Group of Scotland, Cantilena, SCO Chorus, Edinburgh Festival Chorus |

== 1976 ==
| Orchestras | Conductors | Soloists | Singers | Ensembles and choral groups |
|---|---|---|---|---|
| Scottish National Orchestra, London Sinfonietta, London Philharmonic Orchestra, Gewandhaus Orchestra, Wiener Philharmoniker, Monteverdi Orchestra, New Philharmonia Orchestra, Orchestre de Paris | Mstislav Rostropovich, Alexander Gibson, Mark Elder, Carlo Maria Giulini, Kurt Masur, Claudio Abbado, Karl Böhm, John Eliot Gardiner, Riccardo Muti, Rafael Frühbeck de Burgos, Daniel Barenboim, Peter Maxwell Davies, Leonard Friedman | Miriam Fried, Heinz Holliger, Stephen Bishop-Kovacevich, Wanda Wilkomirska, Maurizio Pollini, Radu Lupu, Alicia de Larrocha, Clifford Curzon, Geoffrey Parsons, András Schiff, James Galway, Anthony Goldstone, Paul Hamburger, Osian Ellis, Martin Isepp, Tadeusz Chmielewski, Marius May, John Fraser | Sheila Armstrong, Helen Watts, Anthony Rolfe Johnson, Thomas Allen, Julia Hamari, Werner Hollweg, Edda Moser, Anna Reynolds, Robert Tear, Gwynne Howell, Frederica von Stade, Günter Reich, Jennifer Smith, Sarah Walker, Peter Pears, David Wilson-Johnson, Elizabeth Harwood, Lajos Kozma, Elisabeth Schwarzkopf, Peter Pears, Jean Dupouy, Daryl Greene, John Angelo Messana | Monteverdi Choir, Vermeer Quartet, Alban Berg Quartet, The King's Singers, American Brass Quintet, The Fires of London, Scottish Baroque Ensemble, The Music Party, Southend Boys Choir, Edinburgh Festival Chorus |

== See also ==
- Edinburgh International Festival
- World premieres at the Edinburgh International Festival
- Musicians at the Edinburgh International Festival, 1947–1956
- Musicians at the Edinburgh International Festival, 1957–1966
- Opera at the Edinburgh International Festival: history and repertoire, 1947–1956
- Opera at the Edinburgh International Festival: history and repertoire, 1957–1966
- Opera at the Edinburgh International Festival: history and repertoire, 1967–1976
- Ballet at the Edinburgh International Festival: history and repertoire, 1947–1956
- Ballet at the Edinburgh International Festival: history and repertoire, 1957–1966
- Ballet at the Edinburgh International Festival: history and repertoire, 1967–1976
- Drama at the Edinburgh International Festival: history and repertoire, 1947–1956
- Drama at the Edinburgh International Festival: history and repertoire, 1957–1966
- Drama at the Edinburgh International Festival: history and repertoire, 1967–1976
- Visual Arts at the Edinburgh International Festival, 1947–1976
