= Maida Vale Studios =

Broadcasting facility in London, England

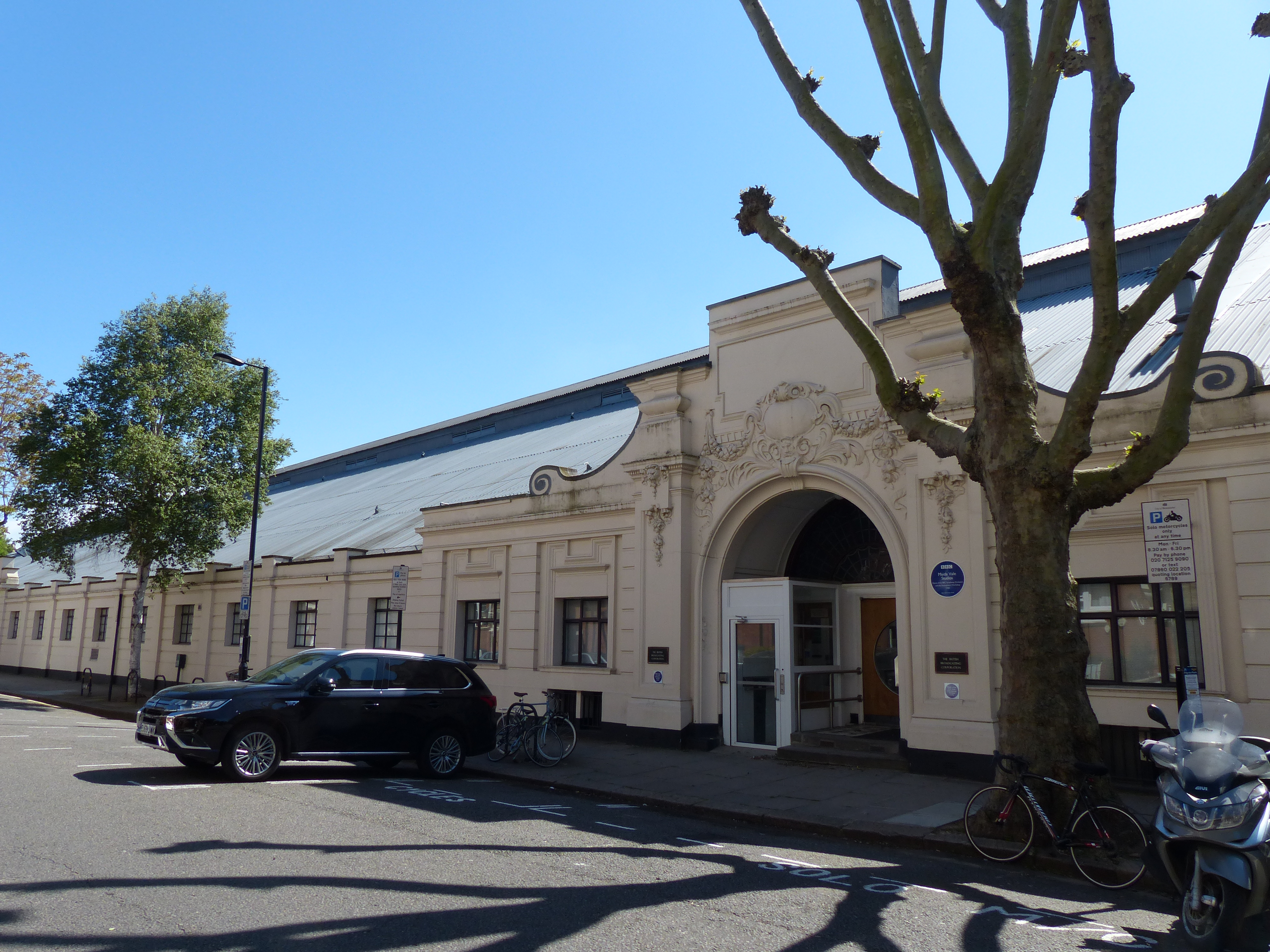
- Exterior of Maida Vale Studios in 2020
- Former names: Maida Vale American Skating Palace

General information
- Architectural style: Edwardian Baroque
- Location: Maida Vale, London, United Kingdom
- Coordinates: 51.5258°N 0.1904°W
- OS Grid Ref: TQ 2563 8231
- Current tenants: BBC Music
- Year built: 1909–1910
- Renovated: 1933–1934; (Converted into BBC studios)

Design and construction
- Architecture firm: Detmar and Gregg

Other information
- Public transit: Maida Vale

Website
- www.bbc.co.uk/historyofthebbc/buildings/maida-vale

National Heritage List for England
- Type: Grade II listed building
- Criteria: Architectural interest; Historic interest
- Designated: 5 May 2020
- Reference no.: 1463441

Maida Vale Studios is a complex of seven BBC sound studios, of which five are in regular use, in Delaware Road, Maida Vale, west London.

It has been used to record thousands of classical music, popular music and drama sessions for BBC Radio 1, BBC Radio 2, BBC Radio 3, BBC Radio 4 and BBC Radio 6 Music from 1946 to the present. On 30 October 2009, BBC Radio 1 celebrated 75 Years of Maida Vale by exclusively playing 75 tracks recorded at the studios over the years. Snow Patrol played a live set from the studio with Fearne Cotton to celebrate 75 years of live music from the venue.

In June 2018, the BBC announced the closure of the studios. In May 2020, Historic England designated it as a Grade II Listed Building. The BBC planned to vacate the premises by 2025, moving into a new development which is part of the Olympic Park, offering high-tech facilities and two spaces for public concerts.

In August 2023, the studios were sold to a partnership between Tim Bevan & Eric Fellner, and Hans Zimmer & Steven Kofsky.

== History ==
The complex was built in 1909–1910 as the Maida Vale American Skating Palace. Over a period of 15 months in 1933–1934, the roller skating rink was reduced to a shell then rebuilt as a BBC facility. The arches at the doorway were preserved. It was one of the BBC's earliest premises, and was the centre of the BBC News operation during World War II.

It has been the home of the BBC Symphony Orchestra since 1934, where the orchestra has given invitation concerts, usually free. As a schoolboy, conductor Vernon Handley learned some of his technique by watching Sir Adrian Boult conduct the BBC Symphony Orchestra here. Studio MV1 has room for an orchestra of over 150 musicians and an audience of over 200. An unusual feature of these concerts is that they were often recorded, which means that in later years the orchestra was sometimes able to do re-takes. It is the largest classical music studio in London.

The BBC Third Programme (which became BBC Radio 3 in 1967) was created in September 1946. By the 1950s, it was frequently broadcasting concerts from this venue, including the first broadcast performance of Carl Orff's Carmina Burana, given by the resident orchestra with the Goldsmiths Choral Union and soloists. Some premieres of British classical music were recorded in studio MV1, including works by Robert Simpson, Arnold Bax, Nicholas Maw, Alan Rawsthorne and Sir Arthur Bliss. Many of them later became available on vinyl or CD. Olivier Messiaen's Turangalîla-Symphonie was rehearsed here, before its UK premiere at the Royal Festival Hall.

In 1958, the BBC Radiophonic Workshop was created, and based at Maida Vale Studios until its closure in 1998; the pioneering Delaware synthesiser made by EMS takes its name from the studios' address. The workshop's rooms are now used as a small TV studio for the Film programme, audio archiving facilities, engineering workshops and office space. In the late 1950s and early 1960s, the radio programme Movie-Go-Round was broadcast from here, in which Peter Haigh played sound clips from major films. The Beatles used studio MV5 several times in 1963 to record sessions for BBC Radio. The sessions for John Peel's BBC Radio 1 programme as well as Peter Clayton's Sounds of Jazz (broadcast on Sunday evenings using the BBC Radio 2 VHF transmitters) were also recorded at Maida Vale.

The studios have been under regular threat of closure by BBC management: the building is in need of constant maintenance and due to its location in a residential area there are limits to the hours of operation and access. In July 2007, the BBC announced that the studios were "wholly unsuitable for the 21st century", and it was reported that it would be sold to property developers as part of cost-cutting measures.

On 5 June 2018, the BBC announced that the studios would close by 2023. The intention is for the BBC's live music base to be relocated in Stratford, east London. It plans to move staff to a new development in Stratford by 2025. The decision drew criticism from Geoff Barrow of Portishead and Radiohead producer Nigel Godrich.

The COVID-19 outbreak led to the BBC closing the building temporarily, with effect from 27 March 2020. The building has since been re-opened.

On 5 May 2020, the studios were added to the List of Buildings of Special Architectural or Historic Interest by Historic England. In September 2020, it was revealed that the BBC were lodging an objection to the listing, reportedly so that it could sell off the property. It was reported in February 2022 that the UK's Department for Culture, Media and Sport had turned down the appeal. The building is Grade II listed.

In November 2022, the studios went on sale for over £10.5 million. The studios were subsequently sold to a partnership between Tim Bevan & Eric Fellner, and Hans Zimmer & Steven Kofsky for £10.5 million.

In June 2026, BBC Radio 1 stated that Olivia Rodrigo's Live Lounge performance was the last to be recorded from their Maida Vale studios. The last session of the BBC tenure was performed in August 2026 by Fontaines D.C., in a BBC Radio 6 Music programme hosted by Steve Lamacq.

== Facilities ==
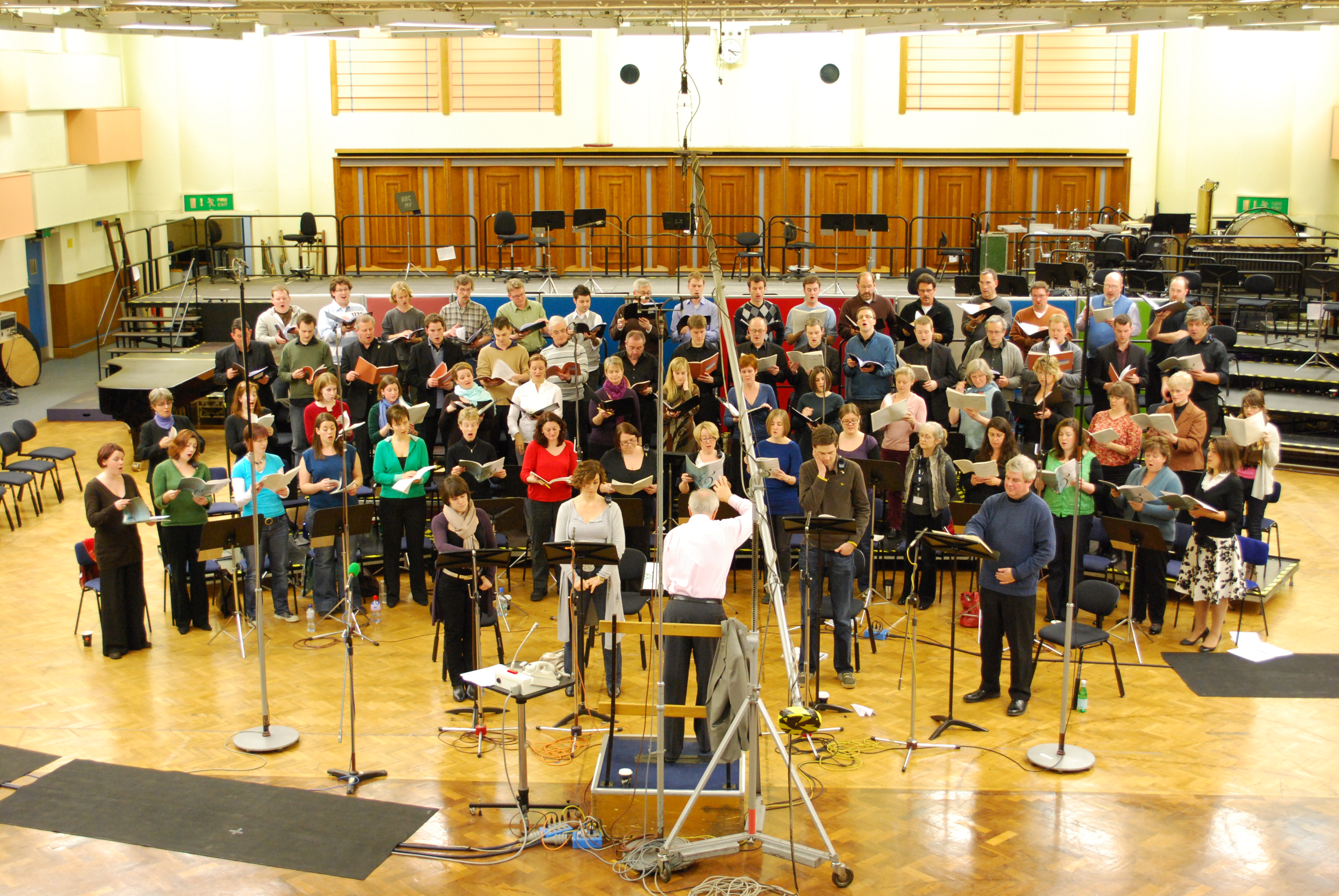
BBC Singers at Maida Vale MV1

- Studio MV1 is one of the largest recording spaces available in the UK. Equipped with a SSL System T digital desk, MV1 is currently home to the BBC Symphony Orchestra. It was also used by the BBC Concert Orchestra on some of its larger sessions until the early 1990s.
- Studio MV2 had its technical installation decommissioned some years ago. It currently provides rehearsal space for the BBC Singers and the BBC Symphony Chorus.
- Studio MV3 is a large studio, equal in size to MV2. With an SSL 9000J series analogue desk installed, MV3 is used for a large number of Radio 2 programmes and some Radio 1 session recordings and live audience shows. Bing Crosby made his last recording session in this studio in 1977, three days before he died of a heart attack on a golf course in Spain. It was the home of the BBC Radio Orchestra, a specialist light music session orchestra, with various music directors including Neil Richardson, John Fox, Roland Shaw, Ronnie Aldrich, Johnny Gregory and Ron Goodwin.
- Studio MV4 is a smaller studio with vocal booth and balcony. Utilising a SSL 9000J series analogue desk, MV4 was home to the John Peel sessions and has continued to be used to record the BBC Radio 1 sessions for shows that have replaced Peel's.
- Studio MV5 is now one of two spaces used for the Live Lounge, and plays host to a large number of current pop acts.
- Studio MV6 is a drama studio still in regular use to produce programmes for BBC Radio 3, BBC Radio 4, BBC Scotland and others.
- Studio MV7 was a drama studio before being decommissioned. BBC Radio 2 started using this studio again in August 2018 and 2019 due to air conditioning repairs being carried out in Wogan House for a three and then four-week stint. More recently it was used by BBC Radio 3 to broadcast In-Tune using a SSL System T console whilst its regular studio in Broadcasting House was being refurbished.

== John Peel Sessions ==
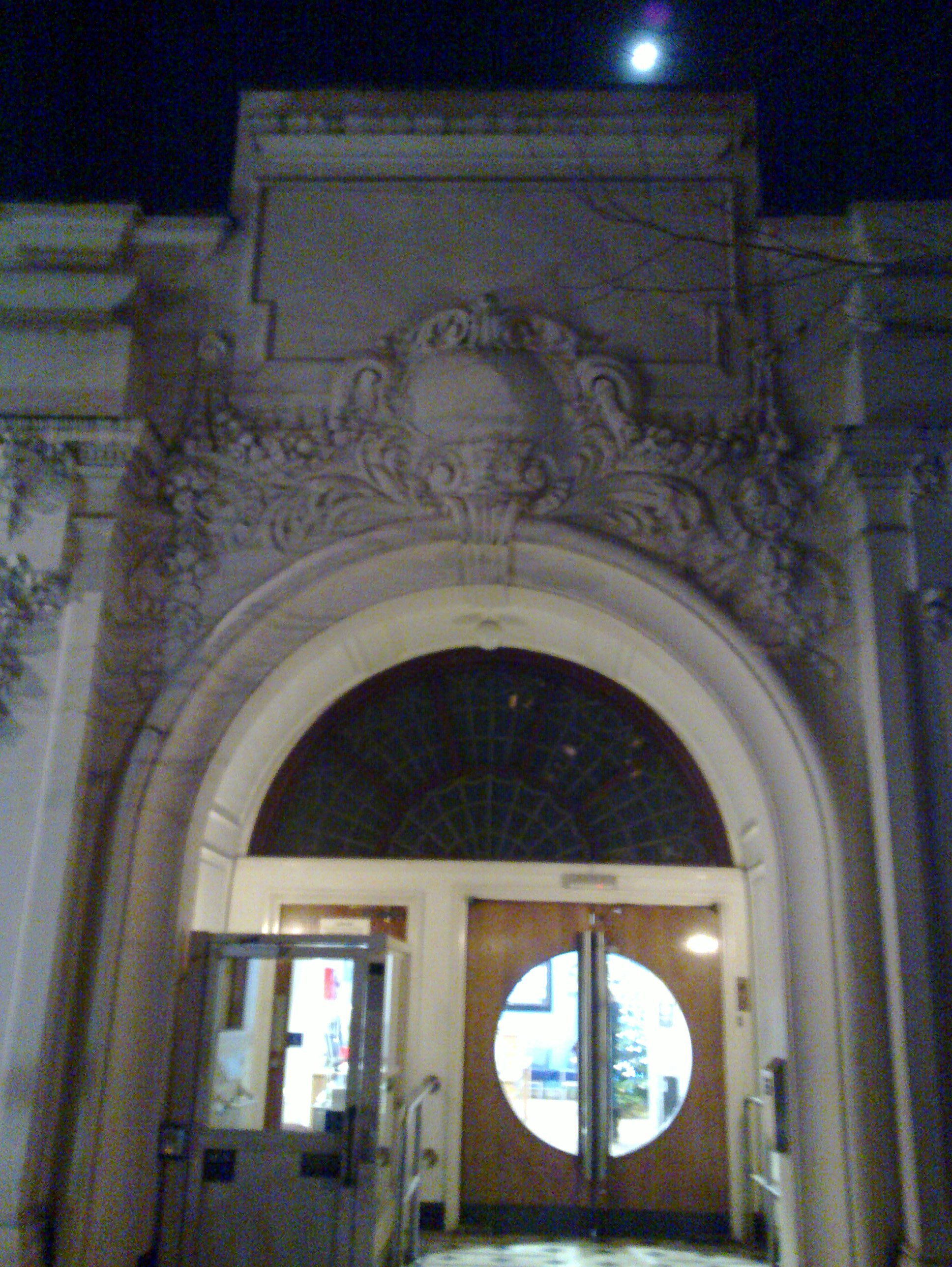
Maida Vale Studios, Delaware Road, Maida Vale, London

From 1967 to 2004, the John Peel Sessions were recorded in studio MV4. At first, a number of other venues around London were also used, such as the Playhouse Theatre in Charing Cross, but as these ceased to be used by the BBC, the sessions increasingly centred on Maida Vale 4. Music sessions were once a mainstay of BBC Radio programming, as there were strict limits on the amount of commercially recorded music that could be aired, known as needle-time restrictions, so the BBC regularly booked musicians to record music exclusively for broadcast. In the early 1960s, when the BBC began to give some limited coverage of pop groups such as The Beatles, it was found that the sessions allowed up-and-coming bands to gain exposure, and for musicians and groups to try out new material, play covers they would not include on their albums, whilst also experimenting with different sounds and guest musicians.

With the introduction of Radio 1 in 1967, programmes such as Top Gear embraced this concept, with sessions from such stars-in-waiting as David Bowie, Led Zeppelin and Jimi Hendrix. When one of Top Gear's presenters, John Peel, gained his own programme, specially commissioned recording sessions had a new outlet. Most of the artists were relatively unknown even to Peel's listeners: he and his producer would often invite bands on the strength of a rough demo tape or gig to hear what they could do, and for many of the bands it was their first experience of a professional recording studio, not to mention a much-needed boost to their finances. The format became standardised as a single session in the studio with a staff producer and engineer (or more latterly a producer-engineer and assistant), during which the artists would record four songs, but there were also some sessions which were either live to air, or pre-recorded as live with an audience. Other Radio 1 programmes and DJs adopted a similar system of Maida Vale sessions, such as Janice Long, Andy Kershaw, and The Evening Session (whose former host, Zane Lowe, nicknamed the studio 'Maida Vegas'), as well as the more direct inheritors of the Peel Sessions tradition, Huw Stephens, Rob da Bank and Mike Davies.

Peel said "The Clash did half one, then amazingly said that the equipment in the studio wasn't up to the standards they'd expected so they couldn't complete the session. Which seemed to me to be unbearably pretentious of them". Some albums by the Fall were entirely recorded there. The last band to record a Peel session was Skimmer, at Maida Vale Studios on 21 October 2004.

Robin Dallaway of The Cravats remarked that recording at Maida Vale was like stepping back into the 1940s: "blokes in brown stockmen's coats scurried around fixing stuff and plugging our gear in." When Broadcast made their Peel sessions, Trish Keenan wrote "There was a sense of initiation on entering the Maida Vale studios. ... we wandered through the corridors, peering through the windows of locked rooms, on a hunt for the Radiophonic Workshop. We came across abandoned tape machines and Shostakovich posters in the hallways... We hovered outside the locked Radiophonic room, a little disappointed by what we could see through the window. We contemplated unscrewing the Radiophonic Workshop name plate from the door and making off with it, but knew the stern-faced security guard from earlier would have been on to us."

== Notable performers ==
Other BBC disc jockeys invited artists to perform at Maida Vale: Led Zeppelin recorded for Alexis Korner's Rhythm and Blues programme in 1969, Walter Trout and Rob Tognoni recorded for Paul Jones's R & B show, Marillion recorded for Radio 2 DJ Bob Harris and Jo Whiley invited Hard Fi to play at the studios. The venue is also the home of the BBC Elstree Concert Band. The Radio 3 Jazz Line Up sessions were recorded here.

Bing Crosby did his last recording session on 11 October 1977 at Maida Vale. The last song of the session was "Summer Wind" and the last song on the album is "Once in a While."

In October 1996, George Michael recorded a rehearsal for, what would be days later, his hit MTV Unplugged performance.

In 1994, the Beatles' album Live at the BBC was released, with most of the material having been recorded at Maida Vale. Several other albums, sometimes named after the studios, were recorded in studio MV4. Van der Graaf Generator released an album called Maida Vale in 1994. Portions of October 1990 and September 1991 sessions by Nirvana were released in 2004 on the band's With the Lights Out box set. In 2006, the group Hefner released an album called Maida Vale, which was recorded here. The White Stripes included their version of the Dusty Springfield classic "I Just Don't Know What to Do with Myself", recorded for The Evening Session in MV4 by Miti Adhikari on their album Elephant. In 2002, Andrea Bocelli's Sentimento was made at the studios. The label Maida Vale Records, a subsidiary of Cooking Vinyl, has a policy of releasing material from various radio stations. Radiohead recorded their 2011 live video The King of Limbs: Live from the Basement at Maida Vale.
