= Lavilla (name) =

Lavilla is a surname and a feminine given name. Notable people with the name include:

== Surname ==
- Félix Lavilla (1928–2013), Spanish pianist
- Gregorio Lavilla (born 1973), Spanish motorcycle road racer
- James Lavilla-Havelin, American poet
- Landelino Lavilla (1934–2020), Spanish lawyer and politician

== Given name ==
- Lavilla Esther Allen (1834–1903), American author
