= BBC Scottish Radio Orchestra =

Light music orchestra

- Orchestra
- Short name: SRO
- Former name: Scottish Variety Orchestra (1940); BBC Scottish Variety Orchestra
- Founded: 1940; 86 years ago
- Disbanded: 1981; 45 years ago
- Location: Glasgow, Scotland

The BBC Scottish Radio Orchestra (SRO) was a light music broadcasting orchestra based in Glasgow, Scotland, maintained by the British Broadcasting Corporation from 1940 until disbandment in 1981.

== History ==
Established by the BBC in 1940 as the Scottish Variety Orchestra, the orchestra was originally a freelance ensemble under the direction of arranger and conductor Ronnie Munro and based at the BBC Studios in Glasgow. It shared studio space with the BBC Scottish Symphony Orchestra. This new orchestra had an instrumentation comprising a small brass section, woodwinds, four saxophones, strings and a basic rhythm section including accordion. Having a small saxophone section, it was effectively a showband, and this line up which would enable it to play both light and dance music. One of its functions being to accompany the variety shows which were produced in Scotland for the BBC National Programme and the Scottish Home Service. Initially it had regular appearances in 'Music While You Work' and in the long-running series 'Sunday Serenade'.

At the end of the war the orchestra was made a regular salaried, staff orchestra and its title was amended to BBC Scottish Variety Orchestra, now under the direction of Kemlo Stephen. Under Stephen, and subsequent conductor Jack Leon, the dance band element of the orchestra was toned down, and the emphasis was changed to straight light music, though the orchestra still accompanied popular singers and played programmes of Scottish Dance music which continued to be important part of its repertoire. The orchestra's accordionist Archie Duncan was featured prominently in these arrangements. By this time the orchestra participated in a wide range of programmes for the Scottish Home Service and the Light Programme - "Bright and Early", "Morning Music", "Melody on the Move", "Lunch Date" and "Music On the Move" in which they played programmes of Scottish Dance Music.

Kemlo Stephen and Jack Leon were succeeded in 1966 by conductor Iain Sutherland. The orchestra gave a weekly Tuesday morning broadcast in 'Music While You Work', as well as playing in all the other regular light music slots. It also played for television, accompanying singers such as Moira Anderson. The London-based BBC Variety and BBC Revue Orchestras were merged in 1965 to form the BBC Radio Orchestra, so at Sutherland's suggestion the Scottish Variety Orchestra was renamed the BBC Scottish Radio Orchestra in January 1967.

=== The B1, B2 and C1 Orchestras ===
In 1972, as part of a revamp of the light orchestras, the BBC changed the structure of the orchestra, to match its London counterpart, the BBC Radio Orchestra, a large studio orchestra of around 65 players which included a full Big Band and symphonic sized wind and strings. This was a grouping that could be used in its entirety or broken down into a series of flexible ensembles prefixed A-E.

The New Scottish Radio Orchestra's instrumentation, classified B1, B2 and C1 to match its London counterparts, had a full complement of 32, and was a big band with strings in the Billy May/Nelson Riddle style. The full ensemble was classified as the B1 Orchestra, comprising 5 saxes, flute, 4 trumpets, 4 trombones, piano, guitar, bass, drums, percussion, 10 violins, 2 violas and 2 cellos. All the players in the sax section played one or more other instruments including flutes, piccolo, clarinets and different varieties of saxophones, and the pianist also played celeste and electric organ. For special live broadcasts and projects, the full SRO was occasionally augmented with players from the BBC Scottish Symphony Orchestra. The B2 Orchestra featured the string and rhythm sections of the SRO. The C1 Orchestra's 16 players formed the same big band as that which was the basis of the B1, and was sometimes known as the Radio Scotland Big Band. It shared many arrangements with its London based colleagues the BBC Big Band, and many of the BBC SRO's broadcasts featured just the C1 big band section. With this change in format, the orchestra now played a great deal of jazz and swing as well as light music and accompanying popular singers.

Under the direction of composer and arranger Brian Fahey, the BBC Scottish Radio Orchestra also did a lot of television work accompanying the likes of Kenneth McKellar, Lena Martell, Moira Anderson, Shirley Bassey, Lulu, Lena Zavaroni and Anne Lorne Gilles. It also had its own BBC One programme, Make Way for Music. They recorded 'inserts' for the many music and chat shows on Radio 2 and Radio Scotland, recording with artists including Cleo Laine, Georgie Fame, Carol Kidd and trombonist Don Lusher.

=== Closure ===
With the ever-increasing air-time being given to commercial pop music, there was less time available for staff studio orchestras, the costs of which were becoming disproportionate to their use. In 1980 the BBC announced its intention to disband several of its staff light orchestras including the Northern Radio Orchestra, and Midland Radio Orchestra, as well as the BBC Scottish Symphony Orchestra. However the Scottish Radio Orchestra was not one of the orchestras under threat. Strike action followed which seriously disrupted the Proms, and incensed musicians took every opportunity to state their cause. The compromise that ended the strike saved the Scottish Symphony Orchestra at the expense of the Scottish Radio Orchestra, which had previously not been considered for disbandment. The irony was that whilst the SRO had fought to save its classical counterparts, when the situation was reversed the Scottish Radio Orchestra was axed without much of a fight.

Part of the compromise included a guarantee that the BBC would give all the musicians in the SRO an agreed number of engagements per year, for the next five years. As a unit, the BBC Scottish Radio Orchestra was officially disbanded early in 1981, one of their final performances being at the Playhouse Theatre in Edinburgh with Ella Fitzgerald. They continued to perform for the BBC as a group under freelance contracts until 1986.
