= BBC Big Band =

British jazz big band

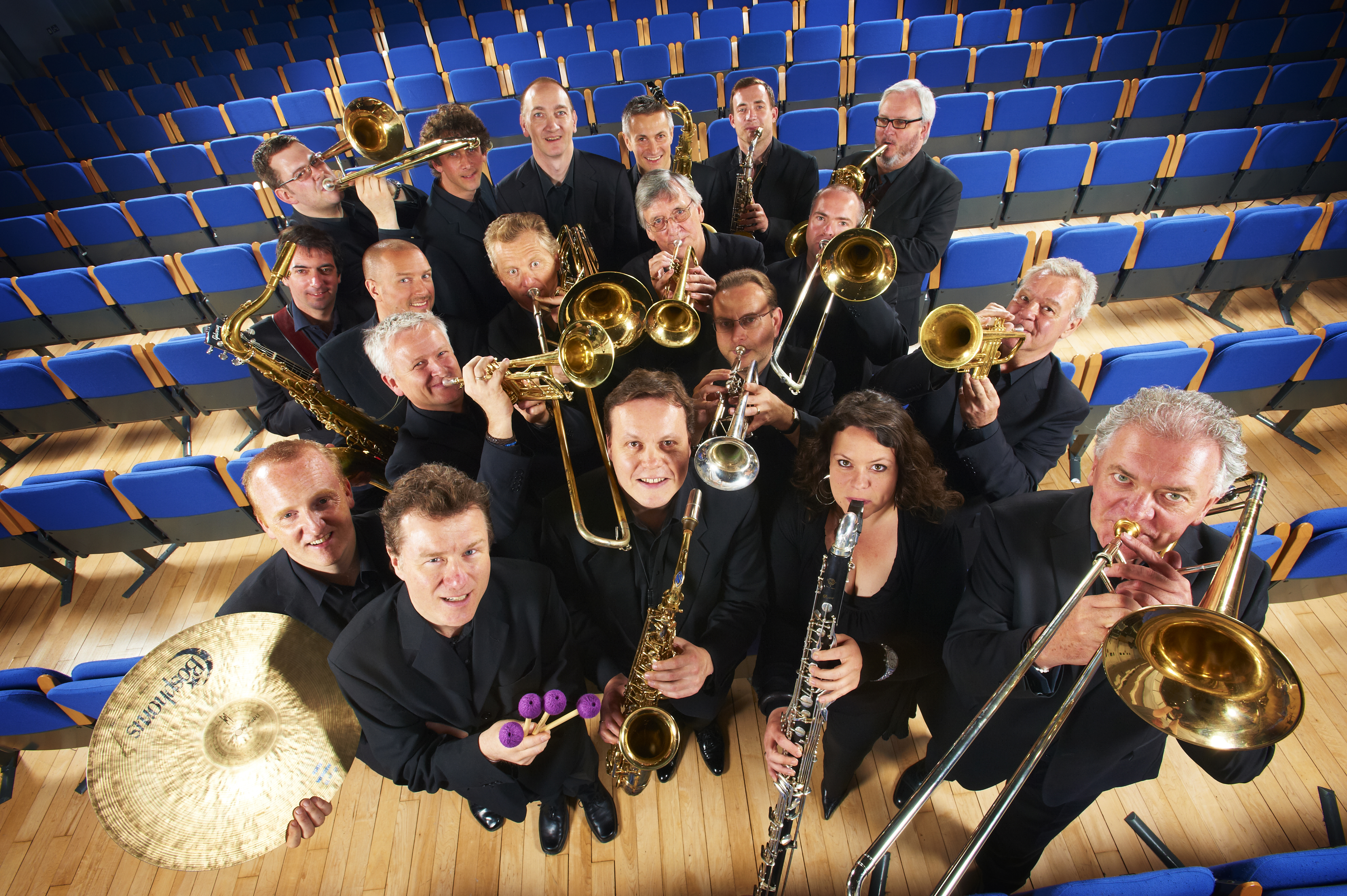
- BBC Big Band at Town Hall Birmingham

Background information
- Origin: UK
- Genres: Jazz, big band
- Years active: 1964–present
- Website: bigbandspecial.co.uk

The BBC Big Band, originally known as the BBC Radio Big Band is a British big band, previously run under the auspices of the British Broadcasting Corporation (BBC). The band broadcasts exclusively on BBC Radio, particularly on BBC Radio 2's long-running series Big Band Special. It consists of professional musicians and is directed by a number of conductors. These include arranger and composer Barry Forgie, who has been the band's Musical Director since 1977, American jazz trombonist Jiggs Whigham, and guest musical directors.

== History ==
The BBC Big Band's origins lie in the earliest days of the BBC when the BBC Dance Orchestra was formed in 1928 under the leadership of Jack Payne before Henry Hall took over in 1932. Benny Carter was hired as the arranger from 1935 to 1938. In the 1950s, the format and purpose of the Dance Orchestra was changed and modernised, and it became a big band with strings in the Billy May style, known as the BBC Showband, under the leadership of Cyril Stapleton. The band, featuring many British jazz players, was heavily featured on the BBC Light Programme and also began to be used widely in television in the company of homegrown talent, including a then unknown Matt Monro, and with international stars such as Frank Sinatra and Nat 'King' Cole.

The BBC Big Band came into existence in 1964 when the existing BBC Variety Orchestra and BBC Revue Orchestra were amalgamated creating the BBC Radio Orchestra.

The BBC Radio Orchestra was a large flexible studio ensemble on the Nelson Riddle/Henry Mancini model, with a full jazz Big Band and symphonic strings. The BBC Big Band made up the orchestra's brass, reed and rhythm sections, and was nominally the orchestra's jazz wing. The various sections of the Radio Orchestra, prefixed A-D, could be used for different kinds of recordings and the "C1" section of the BBC Radio Orchestra was known as the BBC Radio Big Band. The orchestra was initially directed by Malcolm Lockyer, who had previously directed the BBC Showband and BBC joined by various arrangers and guest conductors, including Barry Forgie in 1977, who remains the big band's Musical Director. At the outset, the big band was sometimes known within the BBC as the 'Radio Dance Orchestra' or 'Radio Showband', utilising some of the names the band had been previously known under, but it was officially called the Radio Big Band from 1964.

For the most part, it has been a standard-sized big band, comprising four trumpets, four trombones, five saxophones (all of whom double on various reed and wind instruments) and a rhythm section of piano (doubling keyboards), guitar, double bass (doubling bass guitar), drums and percussion (including vibes and Latin instruments). For various projects, the band has also seen regular augmentation with additional instruments including French horns, tubas, extra wind and on occasion large groups of strings, particularly the BBC Concert Orchestra, (effectively recreating the line-up of the BBC Radio Orchestra).

The BBC Radio Big Band was also complemented by similar ensembles throughout the UK, including the BBC Northern Dance Orchestra in Manchester and the BBC Scottish Radio Orchestra in Glasgow (which was also known as the Radio Scotland Big Band).

The band was used across a huge variety of BBC Radio programmes, its main features included Jazz Parade, Saturday Swings and Saturday Night, accompanying singers and performing instrumental versions of popular tunes. Though staffed with many jazz soloists, the band had little in the way of dedicated jazz output and was used primarily as a light-music ensemble and dance band. But in 1979, a significant development took place which led to the band establishing its own identity as a dedicated jazz orchestra when Big Band Special began. Originally commissioned as a series of 12 shows, such was the impact made by the BBC Big Band in this show that the run was extended. The programme remained a key part of Radio 2's Monday night programming up to 2013, latterly presented by jazz singer and broadcaster Clare Teal. The band also found a home on BBC Radio 3's Jazz Parade.

In a shake-up of musical policy at the BBC, the corporation disbanded the BBC Radio Orchestra in 1991, retaining the Big Band. But, in 1994, the BBC once again announced that it had decided to dismantle the Big Band. However, due to overwhelming public opposition to the decision, an agreement was reached, whereby the band would continue to exist, but would be managed outside the BBC and its musicians would be freelance rather than BBC staff.

The BBC Big Band has been voted the best Big Band in the British Jazz Awards in 1992, 1994, 1997, 1999, 2001, 2007, 2013 and 2014.

The band has played with musicians such as Van Morrison, Michael Bublé, Tony Bennett, George Shearing, Michel Legrand, Cleo Laine, John Dankworth, Lalo Schifrin, Dr. John, Mel Torme, Ray Charles, Kurt Elling, Mark Murphy, Jack Bruce, Ed Thigpen, Monty Alexander, Norma Winstone, Clark Terry, Amy Winehouse, Koop, Claire Martin, Ian Shaw, Lea Delaria, The Manhattan Transfer, Buddy Greco, Phil Woods and New York Voices. The band regularly features on the UK jazz festival circuit, and concert tours with major artists have taken the band all over the world in addition to its regular concert recordings throughout the UK for BBC Radio. It also links, from time to time, with the BBC Concert Orchestra, for concerts and broadcasts.

The band has also been conducted by notable members of the big band and jazz world including Billy May, Robert Farnon, Les Brown, Tommy Watt, Angela Morley, Stan Tracey, Bob Brookmeyer, Bill Russo, Gerald Wilson, Roy Hargrove, Thad Jones, Mike Abene, Brian Fahey, Steve Gray, Bob Florence, Sammy Nestico, Jiggs Whigham, Mark Nightingale and Steve Sidwell. The band is also directed on occasions by its longstanding baritone saxophonist Jay Craig.

== Current operations ==
Initially, the BBC Big Band was formed of contracted BBC staff, as with all of the BBC's orchestras. However, following an agreement reached in 1994, the band was able to retain their name whilst operating as freelance musicians.

The final episode of Big Band Special aired on BBC Radio 2 in 2013. Currently, the band is contracted to perform in live events (such as Friday Night Is Music Night and BBC Proms) and can be heard on BBC Radio 2, BBC Radio 3, BBC Radio Scotland and BBC World Service.

Since 2007, the BBC Big Band has been an associate ensemble at Birmingham Town Hall, performing regularly in concert and participating in community and education projects. The BBC Big Band is also invited to perform in locations across the UK.

In 2017, an episode of the BBC sitcom W1A featured the fictional "BBC Big Swing Band", and the controversy attracted by their proposed disbanding. The programme ends with the central character Ian Fletcher seemingly improvising a policy position live on BBC News, which ends with him announcing a new "creative and commercial freedom" for the BBC Big Swing Band. This seems to echo the BBC Big Band's own real-life relationship with the BBC in the 1990s.

== Members ==
=== Trumpets ===
- Mike Lovatt
- Pat White
- Danny Marsden
- Martin Shaw

=== Trombones ===
- Gordon Campbell
- Andy Wood
- Ashley Horton
- John Higginbotham

=== Saxophones ===
- Howard McGill
- Sammy Mayne
- Paul Booth
- Martin Williams
- Jay Craig

=== Piano ===
- Robin Aspland

=== Guitar ===
- Tommy Emmerton

=== Bass ===
- Jeremy Brown

=== Drums ===
- Tom Gordon

=== Percussion ===
- Anthony Kerr
