= BBC Radio Orchestra =

- Orchestra
- Former name: BBC Revue Orchestra (1936); BBC Variety Orchestra (1934); New Radio Orchestra
- Founded: 1964; 62 years ago
- Disbanded: 1991; 35 years ago
- Location: London, United Kingdom
- Principal conductor: Iain Sutherland

The BBC Radio Orchestra was a broadcasting orchestra based in London, maintained by the British Broadcasting Corporation from 1964 until 1991.

The BBC Radio Orchestra was formed in 1964 as a large, flexible studio orchestra on the Nelson Riddle/Henry Mancini model, featuring a full jazz Big Band combined with symphonic strings. The various sections of the Radio Orchestra, prefixed A-E, could be used for different kinds of recordings and sessions. Of all these sections, only the "C1" big band section of the Radio Orchestra had its own real identity and was known as the BBC Radio Big Band. The orchestra's primary function was to accompany popular singers in 'cover versions' and play instrumental arrangements of the popular tunes of the day on BBC Radio 2, as in the 1960s, broadcasting regulations meant the BBC was only allowed to play five hours of commercial gramophone records per day on air. However, the Radio Orchestra did play a great deal of jazz and light music by leading light composers and arrangers including Robert Farnon, Angela Morley and Nelson Riddle, Neil Richardson, Ron Goodwin and Leon Young. At its peak it was considered one of the finest studio orchestras in the world.

The BBC Radio Orchestra was disbanded in 1991, with the BBC Big Band retained as a full-time ensemble till 1994 when the corporation made the band a freelance unit, whilst allowing it to retain its name and identity.

== History ==
When the BBC Radio Popular Music department was formed in the early 1960s, it inherited both the BBC Revue Orchestra and the BBC Variety Orchestra. The Revue Orchestra started life as the BBC Television Orchestra in 1936, founded and conducted by Hyam Greenbaum. There were 28 players. It was disbanded in September 1939 on the outbreak of war, but Greenbaum used a nucleus of its players to form the BBC Revue Orchestra, playing light variety music for BBC radio from its base in Bangor, North Wales. Harry Rabinowitz was its conductor between 1953 and 1960. The BBC Variety Orchestra was formed in 1934 with Kneale Kelly as its first conductor until 1936, when Charles Shadwell took over for a decade. Rae Jenkins succeeded Shadwell in 1946.

The two ensembles had similar instrumentation and virtually duplicated each other's outputs, so the department immediately began to investigate their possible amalgamation. Michael Standing, the then head of sound broadcasting at the BBC, suggested creating an orchestra that would form a flexible pool of players that could be used for various combinations. The complete listing of the proposed combinations which could be formed out of the 56 musicians who were to make up the new orchestra, comprised, in addition to the full "A" orchestra, no fewer than 10 separate combinations across four groups, B, C, D and E.

On 9 September 1964, Mark White (Organiser, Popular Music Services) produced what was possibly the smallest memo ever sent within the BBC, with the subject "New Aeolian Hall Orchestra", stating definitively that "It has now been decided that the title of the New Aeolian Hall Orchestra will be The Radio Orchestra. In between the words "the" and "orchestra", the word "new" had been written in red ink, spoiling the effect of the new name. The orchestra made its first broadcast as part of the BBC Light Programme show Sunday Best on 18 October 1964. It continued to be billed as the New Radio Orchestra until the end of 1965.

== Sections of the Radio Orchestra ==
=== The A Orchestra ===
Initially, the Radio Orchestra had 56 full-time staff players, comprising:

- 20 violins
- 6 violas
- 6 cellos
- 2 orchestral basses
- Flute/piccolo/bass flute
- Flute/clarinet/alto saxophone
- Oboe/Cor Anglais
- 5 Saxophones, all doubling woodwinds
- 4 Trumpets
- 4 Trombones (including 1 bass trombone)
- 2 Percussion (drums and auxiliary percussion)
- Piano
- Rhythm /jazz bass
- Harp
- Guitar

In addition, the Radio Orchestra was often augmented with extra strings, four French Horns, Tuba, bassoons and extra percussion making the full ensemble up to almost 70 players. The only studio large enough for the A1 orchestra was the Camden, and in May 1967 a series of recording sessions with a range of conductors – one each week – was scheduled. Titled "This is the Radio Orchestra", the series was produced by John Billingham and introduced by Michael Aspel. The Studio Manager was John Andrews, and the conductors, who brought their own arrangements, included Ron Goodwin, John Fox, John Gregory, Roland Shaw, Frank Chacksfield, "Monty" Mantovani, Johnny Harris, Geoff Love and, with his Frank Sinatra arrangements, Nelson Riddle. The orchestra's first staff conductor was Malcolm Lockyer, who had previously conducted the Revue Orchestra. When the Camden studios closed, the Radio Orchestra and Big Band moved operation to the BBC's Maida Vale Studios, namely studio MV3, alongside the BBC Symphony Orchestra.

=== The B1 and B2 Orchestras ===
The B1 Orchestra, with a complement of 30, was effectively a big band with strings in the Billy May/Nelson Riddle style, with 5 saxes, 4 trumpets, 4 trombones, piano, guitar, bass, drums, 10 violins, 2 violas and 2 cellos. All the players in the sax section played one or more other instruments including flutes, piccolo, clarinets and different varieties of saxophones, and the pianist was surrounded by a celeste, an upright "jangle" piano and often an electric organ. This totals 31, as the guitar was an official "augmentation". This lineup was unofficially titled the Radio Showband by radio producers and music staff, as it had the same instrumentation as the BBC Showband of the late 1950s. This was also the full line up of the BBC Scottish Radio Orchestra.

The B2 Orchestra, with a complement of 26, used the components of the A Orchestra not required for the B1, which resulted in a line-up of 10 violins, 4 violas, 4 cellos, 2 basses, 2 flutes, oboe, percussion, harp and guitar.

=== The C1 and C2 Orchestras ===
The C1's 16 players formed the same big band as that which was the basis of the B1, augmented by a guitar, and was known as the BBC Radio Big Band. This left 40 players for the C2, which gave a very good Frank Chacksfield style orchestra of 20 violins, 6 violas, 6 cellos, 2 basses, 2 flutes, oboe, percussion, harp and guitar, with the augmentation of a piano. One of the basses would be a jazz 'rhythm' player. The Strings of the Radio Orchestra were often conducted by arrangers including John Fox, John Gregory, Ronnie Aldrich and Neil Richardson

=== D1, D2 and D3 Orchestras ===
The D1 orchestra was identical to the C1, and the D2 was the same combination as the B2 but less one bass and plus a piano. This left the D3 comprising the string section of the B1 orchestra (10 violins, 2 violas and 2 cellos) plus a bass – not a particularly useful combination. In practice, BBC producers moved four of the violins into the D2 to match the arrangements used by Semprini, and the "leftover" strings were utilised by pianist/arranger Ken Moule, with the addition of a drummer.

=== E1, E2 and E3 Orchestras ===
These three combinations were proposed during the planning of the re-organisation but were never implemented.

The E1 (7 players) was to comprise 4 trumpets, an electric organ, bass and drums. The E2 (29 players) was the largest combination, with 10 violins, 4 violas, 4 cellos, 2 flutes, oboe, 4 trombones, percussion, harp, guitar and piano, with the addition of a bass. The E3 (20 players) would have 10 violins, 2 violas, 2 cellos, bass and 5 saxes. A footnote suggested that the trombone and sax sections could be interchanged between the combinations. It does not seem surprising that no E orchestra sessions ever took place!

Arrangements for various sections of the Radio Orchestra were utilised across BBC's Regional Radio Orchestras: The B1, B2, C1, C2 and D combinations matched the line up of the largest regional orchestra, the BBC Scottish Radio Orchestra, which would occasionally receive augmentation to A size. The BBC Northern Radio Orchestra (previously the BBC Northern Dance Orchestra) utilised C and D combinations, as did the BBC Midland Radio Orchestra.

=== Closure ===
In a change of musical policy at the BBC, the corporation disbanded many of its light orchestras in 1979, including the regional Radio Orchestras, resulting in a dispute with the Musicians' Union that disrupted the Proms that year.

The BBC Radio Orchestra survived, but no Principal Conductor had ever been appointed to the orchestra. In 1988, the Controller of Radio 2, Frances Line, decided that such a position should be created, and Iain Sutherland, who had been the regular conductor of Friday Night Is Music Night, and many other shows, was appointed. New, regular programmes were created showcasing the versatility and range of the Radio Orchestra with great success, but quite suddenly, it was disbanded in 1991. The BBC Big Band was, however, retained as a full-time staff ensemble until 1994, when the staff musicians were made freelance players, and the management of the band was moved outside the BBC.
