= Playhouse Theatre, Manchester =

Theatre in Manchester, England

Playhouse Theatre
- Hulme Hippodrome; Grand Junction Theatre; Junction Picture Theatre; The Playhouse
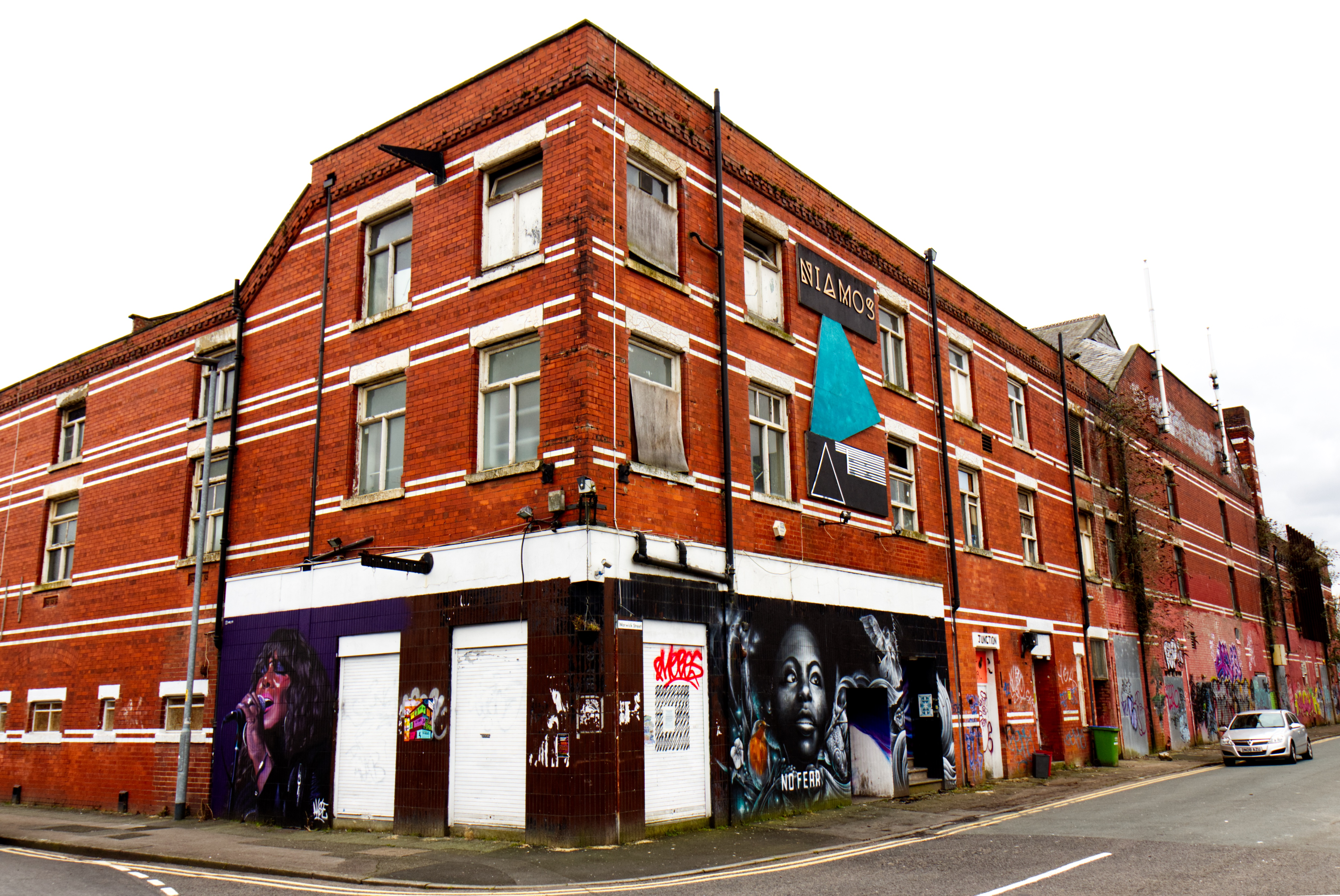
- Address: Warwick Street, Hulme; Manchester M15 5EU; United Kingdom
- Coordinates: 53.4643°N 2.2494°W

Construction
- Opened: 1902
- Architect: J. J. Alley

Listed Building – Grade II
- Official name: The Playhouse, Hulme
- Designated: 7 June 1977
- Reference no.: 1293008

The Playhouse Theatre, as of 2024 a community arts centre called the Niamos Centre, is a theatre in Hulme, Manchester, England. It is a grade II listed building. Originally built as the Hulme Hippodrome in 1902 with a name swap in 1906, the building has also been known as the Grand Junction Theatre, Junction Picture Theatre, The Playhouse, and the Nia Centre. Between 1955 and 1986 it was used as studios by the BBC and known as the BBC Playhouse.

== History ==
=== Hulme Hippodrome (1902–c. 1905) ===
The building was originally known as the Hippodrome (named 1902–1905) and opened on 6 October 1902. The theatre and its larger conjoined Grand Junction Theatre (named 1901–c.1905), were part of the theatrical empire of W. H. Broadhead. The two theatres were reportedly connected by an arcade, though most other researchers dispute this. The combined building of both theatres was the Broadhead's company headquarters for their circuit of 17 theatres across the North West of England.

One researcher suggests that "aqua shows" with a water stage being installed were being considered during construction in 1901 "but did not come to fruition" (p273). There are also a few community stories that the smaller theatre was built in the same year as the larger theatre and not a year later as most accounts report, and that in that first year experiments were held including with animal performances, but the only document found to date to support these stories is one potentially speculative architectural drawing showing entrances for "horses" to a circular performance area.

=== Grand Junction Theatre (c.1905–1929) ===
The theatre originally seated 1,500 and was used for variety acts, while the larger Grand Junction next door concentrated on staging dramatic productions. Fairly quickly in c.1905 the names and the contents of the two theatres were swapped for commercial reasons: this theatre the (former) Hippodrome became the Grand Junction Theatre and continued with dramatic works, while its more popular variety performances were transferred to use the bigger auditorium next door in the (new) Hulme Hippodrome.

=== Junction Picture Theatre (1929–1950) ===
Some time around 1929 the Grand Junction Theatre was converted into a cinema, renamed as the Junction Picture Theatre, an under-researched era. The entire building with both theatres was bought by Buxton Estates in 1932, reportedly to pay for Broadhead's death duties, with an onward sale to James Brennan in 1938.

=== The Playhouse (1950–1955) ===
In 1950 the cinema was converted back to being used as a theatre, now named The Playhouse. The first performance in the newly converted theatre took place on 22 January 1951, The Happiest Days of Your Life, a farce that had recently been made into a film. It became the new base for the Frank H Fortescue Players repertory company of actors who had played in the Hulme Hippodrome during the 1940s.

=== BBC Playhouse, studio (1955–1986) ===
In December 1955, the BBC bought The Playhouse from Brennan's Cinemas Limited to be used a fully equipped rehearsal and production studio for radio and television shows, and the connecting doorways in the internal party wall to Hulme Hippodrome were bricked up. James Brennan retained his ownership of Hulme Hippodrome next door for five more years until 1960. The BBC had previously been hiring the Hulme Hippodrome at weekends for mostly radio recordings (1950–1956) and the BBC needed a studio full-time due to moving out of premises overlooking Piccadilly Gardens. The first programme from the Playhouse, a televised revue entitled Call It A Day, was broadcast in 1956.

The Beatles recorded for the BBC programme Teenager's Turn - Here We Go at the Playhouse on 7 March 1962 (broadcast the next day) and again on 11 June 1962 (broadcast on 15 June 1962). The second recording was of five songs, mostly cover versions but including reportedly the first broadcast performance of a Lennon–McCartney song, namely "Ask Me Why".

Other notable artists who recorded at the BBC Playhouse included Ken Dodd, Les Dawson and Jimmy Clitheroe, It was also the base of the BBC Northern Dance Orchestra. The newest BBC Theatre Organ was installed there in 1970, a Wurlitzer, acquired from the Empress Ballroom, Blackpool. It was introduced on 12 November 1970 as a gala performance edition of The Organist Entertains by Robin Richmond, with performances by Ernest Broadbent, Reginald Dixon and Reginald Porter Brown.

The last BBC production in the theatre took place on 25 August 1986. Meantime the Playhouse had been designated as a Grade II (two) heritage listed building on 8 June 1997, the same day as the conjoined Hulme Hippodrome.

On 2 April 2002, a radio programme in the series Palace of Laughter was broadcast on Radio 4 with interviews of various people who had played at the Playhouse in the BBC years.

=== The Nia Cultural Centre (1989 – 1997) ===
The Nia Cultural Centre was established as a steering committee in 1983, six years before the purchase of the property from the BBC (1989) and seven years before the Nia Cultural Centre was opened (1990) following extensive external and internal changes and repairs. It had its roots in a group of Black-led organisations in Manchester especially:

- West Indian Overseas Co-ordinating Committee (WIOCC);
- Roots Festival;
- Moss Side Arts Group (MAG) which was established in 1982 and organised numerous Black arts events across various venues in the area; and
- Abasindi Black Women's Cooperative, which facilitated the development of the Nia Cultural Centre for African and Caribbean Culture and Arts.

With funding provided by North West Arts and by the Association of Greater Manchester Authorities (AGMA) Grants Committee and reportedly other groups, this building was subsequently bought and converted into an arts centre for African and Caribbean cultures, called the Nia Centre (1991–1997), holding at this point a 900-seat theatre licence including the circle. It claimed to be "the first large-scale, black-led arts centre in Europe". The Nia Cultural Centre's official opening was in the week of 2 May 1991 and on that date featured a performance by Nina Simone.

A detailed account by the African heritage historian, and committee member 1983-1993, Linford Sweeney of the Centre's formation was later published:

- Around 1988, negotiations began to secure the ‘BBC building’ as the African and Caribbean communities’ showcase venue of excellence. This was a long drawn-out process that included Manchester City Council and its Urban [Aid Programme] Fund, North West Arts Board (where I was first a panel member and then non-executive Director), and local residents. At that time too, we had the full support of the North West Arts Board and their Community Officer was instrumental in assisting us to manage the process of funding acquisition. Eventually, the project received £2.1 million [note £1.3m stated below] from a combination of funding bodies and a acquired a seven-year lease. In 1989 refurbishments began to repair a damaged roof and many internal changes were identified including a new reception area, offices, a kitchen, a spectacular skylight, and a sturdier stage. The Nia Cultural Centre opened in 1990, with a staff complement of around twenty, including a Director (Morenga Bambata), Events Manager (Alti Daniel), and several other managers, box office, kitchen, and cleaning staff.

The £2.1 million funding for the Nia Cultural Centre included capital works as well as revenue, and the use of the stage and fly-tower was substantially changed to create new rooms and offices behind and above 'the iron' safety curtain, which became permanently lowered becoming a new wall with a cafe-bar behind and rooms above. Some audience sight lines were also reportedly reduced. The architects were Mills Beaumont Leavey and Tim Ronalds.

"Artists that performed at the Nia Cultural Centre included Nina Simone, Gil Scott-Heron, The Mighty Sparrow, Uncle Tommy Odueso, Fela Kuti, Ziggy Marley, Gregory Isaacs, Jean "Binta" Breeze, Baaba Maal, Dennis Brown, Talawa Theatre Company, The Ghana National Dance Company, Culture, Roaring Lion, Beres Hammond, Luke Dube and John Amos."

However, "despite its determination to succeed, the organisation’s dependence on public funds and community politics, together with difficulties in translating the principle of co-operative economics (Ujamaa) into practical financing, meant that the Centre was unable to sustain itself within the first five years, as was initially envisaged by the Nia Cultural Centre Committee."

A summary of an evaluation of the Nia Centre looked at:

- "the little-documented failure in the 1990s of the Nia Centre, the UK's first black arts centre which opened in Hulme, Manchester in 1991. [This] exploration raises a number of key ethical challenges: How in the aftermath of the Nia's collapse and in the almost complete absence of archival records, is the historian to mediate what inevitably are multiple truths coming from different perspectives?"

=== Fountain Gate Chapel ===
In 2012 The Playhouse was used by the evangelical Fountain Gate Chapel, and in 2017 the building was sold at auction to a new owner, a local property company.

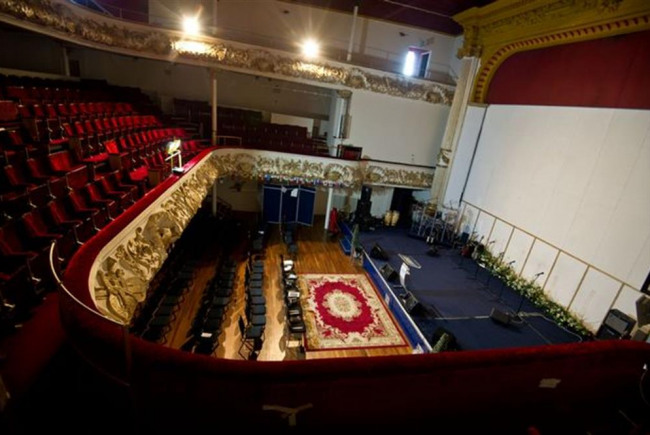
Auditorium, The Playhouse (Niamos) in 2018

=== Niamos Centre ===
As of 2025, the building is tenanted by Niamos Ltd, a non-profit community organisation, and known as the Niamos Centre.

== The building ==
The building is grade II listed and located on Chichester Road, Hulme.

== See also ==
- Listed buildings in Manchester-M15
