= Ron Shulamit Conservatory =

Coordinates: 31.78310921°N 35.19065128°E

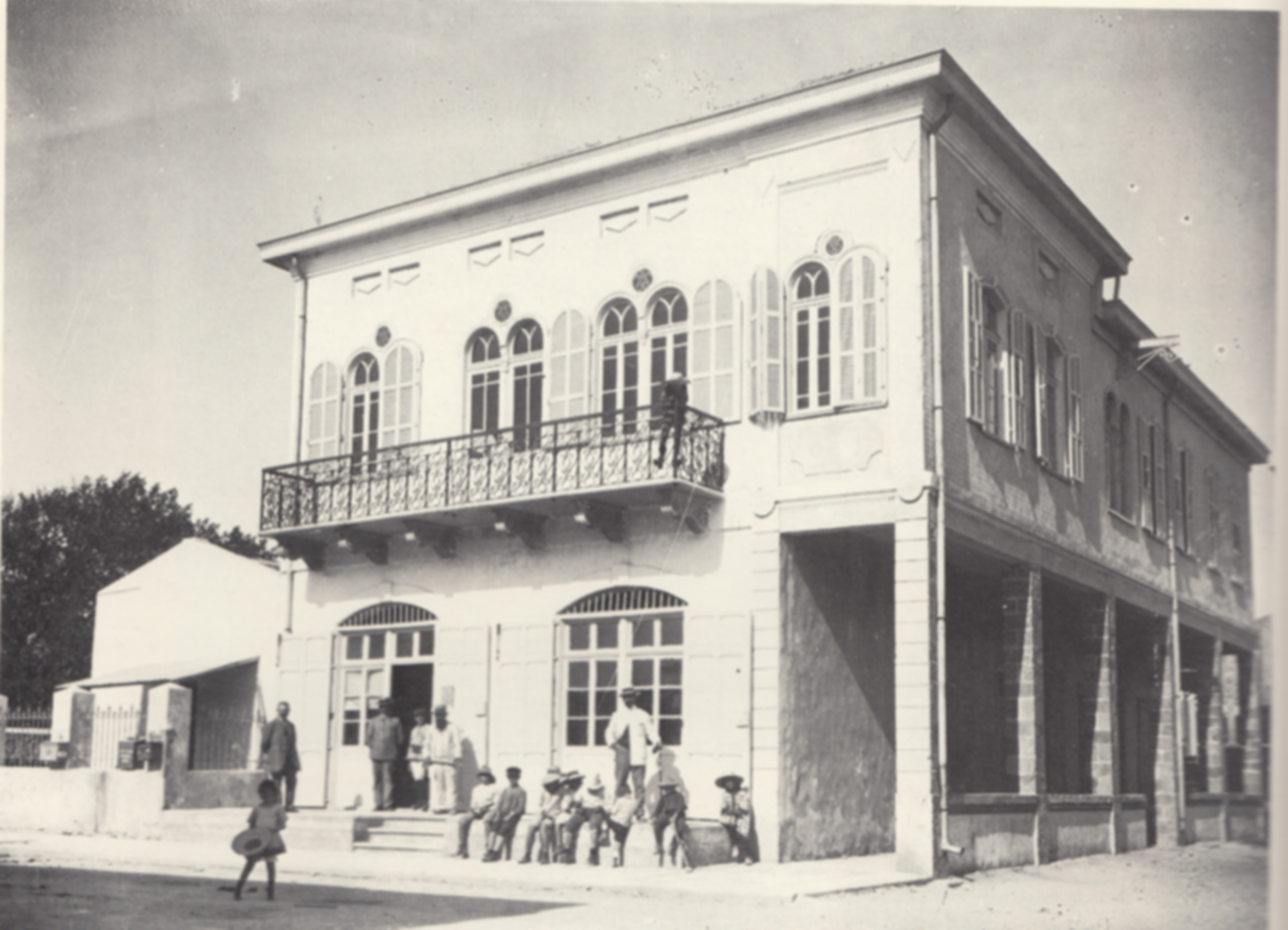
Shulamit Music School, Tel Aviv-Yafo, 1914

The Ron Shulamit Conservatory is a music conservatory in Israel.

== History ==
Music education developed in Israel largely due to the pioneering efforts of Selma Shulamit Ruppin (1873–1912), an opera singer trained in Berlin and Arthur Ruppin's first wife, who established the first conservatory in Jaffa in 1910.

In 1923 the Shulamit Conservatory Orchestra accompanied Mordechai's Golinkin's production of La Traviata, the first opera performed in pre-state Israel.

Ron Conservatory was established and directed by the violinist Yariv Ezrachi, himself a graduate of the Shulamit Conservatory. Famous musicians who studied at Ron include Daniel Benyamini and Shlomo Mintz. In 1968 the two conservatories were merged under the Ron Shulamit name, directed by Ezrachi. Ezrahi's daughter Ofra Broshi later opened a branch in Jerusalem, and today the Ron Shulamit Conservatory operates a coed branch in Bet Hakerem, and one for Orthodox girls in Har Nof.

== Mission and projects ==
The conservatory's mission is to make music and all its benefits, available to everyone, regardless of religious/ethnic background, age, gender, socio-economic status, physical, mental or emotional disabilities. Free open houses are held on a regular basis in addition to performances in nursing homes, community centers, fundraisers for charitable organizations and explained concerts in schools.

The conservatory's "Jewish Music Renaissance Project" researches, collects, records and performs traditional music pieces from Jewish communities around the globe.

The conservatory provides music therapy to children with disabilities and emotional problems. It employs many immigrant musicians, thereby aiding in their absorption process.

== Performing ensembles ==
The performing ensembles include:

- CameRon Student Orchestra – Established in 1995 in an effort to bring people closer to classical music, this chamber orchestra performs a broad repertoire including pieces written specially for them by Israel Edelson and performed as part of the Jewish Music Renaissance Project. Students in the BA program have a chance to conduct the orchestra during rehearsals and performances, and occasionally play with the Zmora orchestra. The state music commission has praised CameRon for its uniqueness and importance.
- Zmora – the only professional all-female string orchestra in Israel recognized by the Ministry of Culture. Established in 2002, it has 15 musicians. Educational concerts in schools, and benefit concerts for charity organizations, as well as free concerts in nursing homes and areas hurt by acts of terror, are all part of the orchestra's unique contribution to the community, and beyond as Zmora performs in the cultural and geographical periphery.
- AccordiRon – A crowd favorite, this student accordion orchestra, is often invited to perform throughout the country. As part of the Jewish Music Renaissance Project, the AccordiRon repertoire continues to grow, and includes their own CD of Jewish folk music.
