= Frederick Haggis =

British conductor (1886–1976)

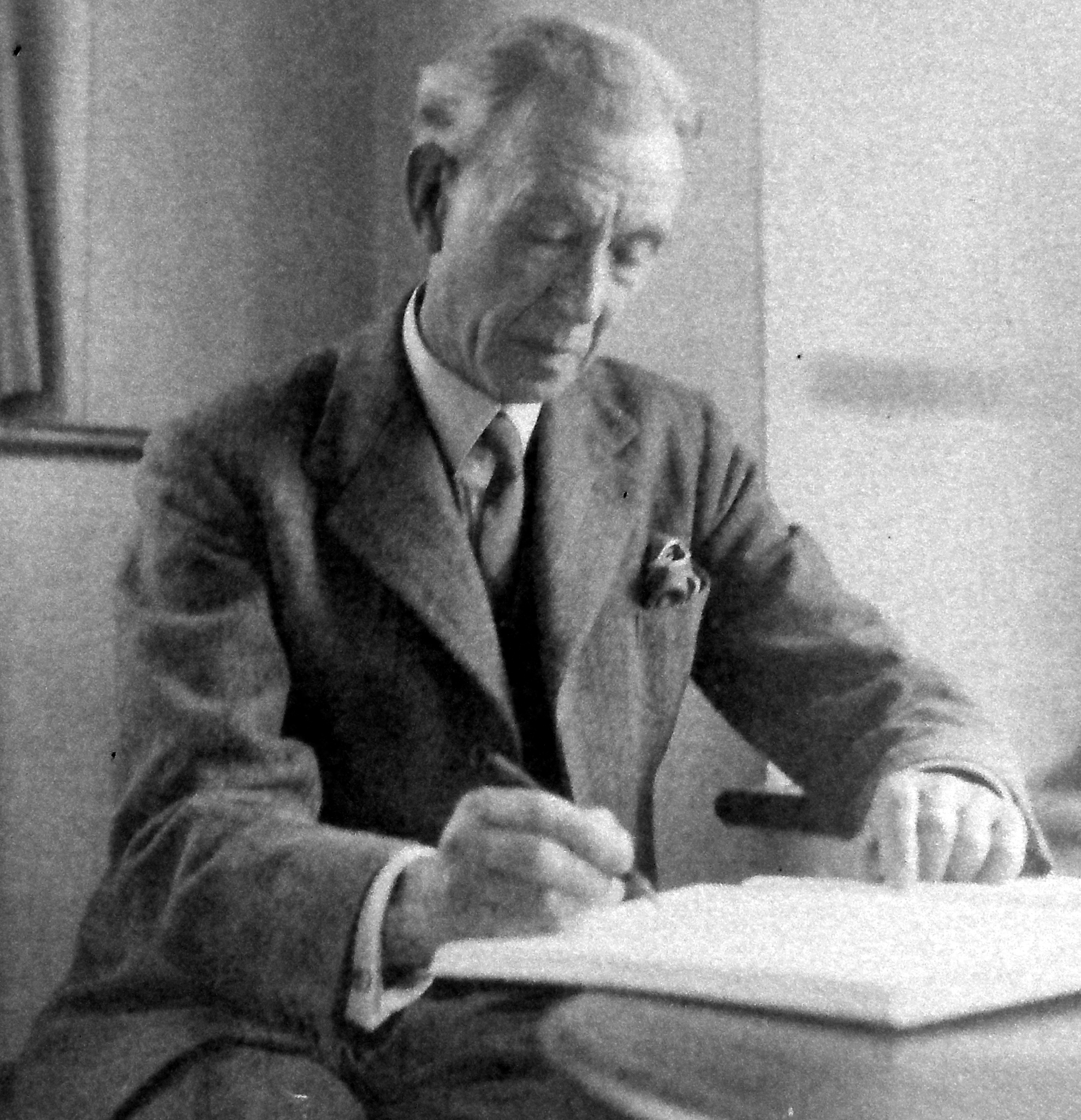
Frederick Haggis

Frederick Charles Haggis (22 April 1886 – 2 December 1976) was a British conductor and founder of the Goldsmiths Choral Union, for which he was principal conductor and musical director for forty years.

He founded the Streatham School of Music in 1919 and conducted the Streatham Philharmonic Choir and Orchestra, producing and conducting the first performances of the Nativity play Bethlehem by Rutland Boughton in London in 1924.

Haggis founded the Goldsmiths Choral Union (GCU) at Goldsmiths College in 1932 and the Goldsmiths Symphony Orchestra in the following year. Over the next two decades under Haggis, the GCU moved to the forefront of the classical music scene in London, performing with major symphony orchestras and broadcasting frequently for the BBC. It continued to rehearse and perform in London during the war despite the college being evacuated and its buildings requisitioned. The GCU performed works by the English composer Sir George Dyson such as The Canterbury Pilgrims in 1939 and Quo Vadis in 1945.

After the war, he was presented with an inscribed silver bowl by the Worshipful Company of Goldsmiths "In recognition of his outstanding contribution to choral singing in London during the war".

He retired from conducting in 1971 at the age of 85 with a celebratory concert at the Royal Albert Hall, conducting the GCU in a performance of The Dream of Gerontius by Edward Elgar. In 1973 he retired as music director.

Clarinettist Jack Brymer pays tribute to Haggis' training in his book From Where I Sit. His name is included in the book of remembrance in the Friends of the Musicians Chapel at the Musicians Church of St Sepulchre-without-Newgate, Holborn.
