= William Pearson (baritone) =

American opera singer

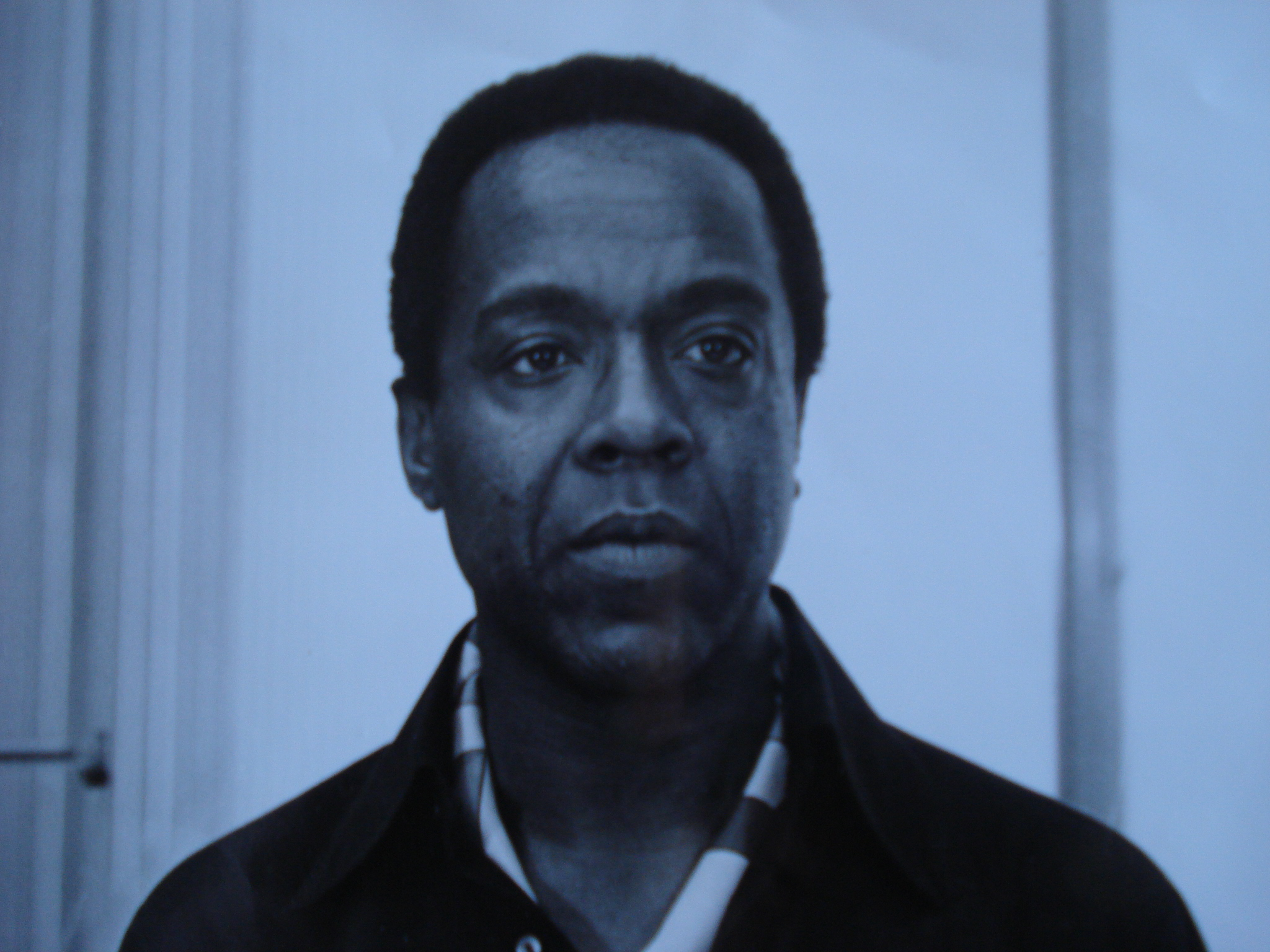
Portrait of William Pearson

William Pearson (1934 - 18 June 1995) was an American born baritone, who spent most of his career in Europe, especially in Germany. He was notable for his wide repertoire, stretching from Bach and Handel to spirituals, modernist and avant garde compositions.

Pearson was born in Tennessee and studied at the School of Music at the University of Louisville, Kentucky. In 1956 he came to Europe on a Fulbright Scholarship, the first black singer to receive the ward. After further study at the Musikhochschule, Cologne, he sang at various German opera houses, and at Budapest and Helsinki where he scored a great success as Porgy in Gershwin's Porgy and Bess in 1965.

After leaving the opera house, Pearson gave concerts and recitals around Germany, as well as in the major cultural centres in Europe.

Several modern composers wrote music for him, including György Ligeti (he was also one of the soloists in Ligeti's Aventures (1962)), Sylvano Bussotti (Pearson wrote the text himself for Bussotti's Pearson Piece (1960) for baritone and piano) and Dieter Schnebel, while he also recorded works by Hans Werner Henze and Mauricio Kagel. He was also one of the few exponents of Peter Maxwell Davies' challenging work Eight Songs for a Mad King.

== Sources ==
- Gerhard R. Koch: Wandelbar identisch. In: Frankfurter Allgemeine Zeitung, July 5, 1995, p. 29
- Elizabeth Forbes: William Pearson: Obituary. In: The Independent, July 17, 1995, p. 12
