= BBC Northern Dance Orchestra =

- Orchestra
- Short name: NDO
- Former name: BBC Northern Variety Orchestra (1951)
- Founded: 1956; 70 years ago
- Disbanded: 1974; 52 years ago
- Later name: BBC Northern Radio Orchestra (1974)
- Location: Manchester, United Kingdom
- Concert hall: Playhouse Theatre
- Principal conductor: Alyn Ainsworth; Bernard J Herrmann

The BBC Northern Dance Orchestra was a big band run by the BBC and formed in 1956 as the successor to the BBC's Northern Variety Orchestra, which had been formed on 1 April 1951. Known to listeners as the NDO, it broadcast on the radio daily, usually from recordings made at the Playhouse Theatre in Hulme, Manchester, and on many trips to halls throughout the UK. Through BBC Transcription Services it gained loyal listeners overseas.

== NVO to NDO ==
The Northern Variety Orchestra owed its roots to Ray Martin and his orchestra, who were playing for variety and other programmes long before the BBC decided to form its own band based in Manchester, Martin did, on occasion, conduct the orchestra. The NVO was featured in the first broadcast from Manchester of Make Way for Music on the Light Programme, 13 May 1955, with Roger Moffat making the announcements.

The Northern Dance Orchestra took over as resident orchestra for Make Way for Music from 21 September 1956, initially billed as the Northern Dance Band, and for its transition to television on 14 January, 1959. Its first conductor was Alyn Ainsworth, who had also conducted the BBC's Northern Variety Orchestra. Ainsworth also wrote some of the band's arrangements together with Pat Nash and Alan Roper, using a standard big band line-up of five saxophones, a flute, four trombones, four trumpets, occasional solo violin, and a rhythm section of piano, double bass, guitar, drums and percussion.

Many well-known musicians played with the orchestra over the years, including trumpeter Syd Lawrence, who left the NDO and formed his own very successful big band in 1967, and saxophonist Johnny Roadhouse, one of the band's founding members. Manchester-born singer Sheila Buxton was closely associated with the orchestra.

== Performances ==
As well as its national radio broadcasts and contributions to musical links for variety shows in Manchester, the orchestra also appeared regularly on BBC television in shows such as Six-Five Special, All Systems Freeman and Make Way for Music. On the radio, it featured in Pop North, and Here We Go with the NDO. It was occasionally augmented by a string section, leader Norman George, almost bringing it back to its Northern Variety Orchestra roots, becoming the Augmented Northern Dance Orchestra.

Some members of the NDO played in the pit orchestra for TV programme The Good Old Days, conducted by flautist Bernard J Herrmann, who succeeded Ainsworth as conductor of the NDO.

== Closure ==
The band was threatened with closure in 1969, as much of its work was by then being carried out by the London-based BBC Big Band, the successor to the BBC Dance Orchestra and BBC Showband, which functioned as part of the larger BBC Radio Orchestra. A public outcry about the closure of the NDO followed, and the band was retained. However, under a shake-up of musical policy, the orchestra was reorganised by the BBC in 1974 as the BBC Northern Radio Orchestra. Under the leadership of Neil Richardson, it continued until the BBC closed many of its in-house orchestras in 1986.

== Recordings ==
The NDO made a number of recordings, including, in 1972, a vinyl LP (BBC Records REC 133s), and a CD, A Legend Reborn (NDO CD 101); these are still available second hand via the NDO project website www.northerndanceorchestra.org.uk.

In 2012, a double CD, DIAMONDS: The Best of the BBC Northern Dance Orchestra, was produced by three ex-BBC staff to celebrate 60 years of music by the orchestra.

In 2013 another double CD album PURE GOLD 1, was issued with music from the band's beginnings up to around 1966.

In November 2013 a double album called RUBY was issued, containing some rare experimental stereo recordings and some of the last stereo recordings the band made in the 1970s.

In April 2014 another limited edition double album, PURE GOLD 2, was released. As with all the preceding CD's this is being sold at cost, and for this double album donations are encouraged to benefit the Musicians Union Benevolent Fund.

September 2014 saw the issue of a 61 track double album, PURE GOLD 3. This contains earlier tracks and more of the last stereo recordings the band made in 1974.

In 2016 a tribute to Bernard Herrmann was released entitled 'Legends' (2x CD set)

In 2020 a tribute to the band's involvement with 'Make way for music' was released - The best of Make way for music (2x CD set)

In 2024 'The NDO - strings and swing and a little pop' was released. (2x CD set)

In 2026 'Make way for music' compilation, with Michael Scott was released (1x CD) dur 59 mins

== See also ==
- List of radio orchestras
