= Mike Lovatt =

British trumpeter

Mike Lovatt is a British trumpeter, currently the Derek Watkins Chair of Trumpet at Royal Academy of Music, and the Principal Trumpet of 'Superbrass' as well as the John Wilson Orchestra.
