= Neil Richardson (composer) =

English composer and conductor

Neil Grant Richardson (5 February 1930 – 8 October 2010) was an English composer and conductor.

Richardson composed "Approaching Menace" (the Mastermind theme tune) and "The Riviera Affair". During the 1960s–1990s, he was an arranger and conductor of various BBC Radio Orchestras, working on programmes such as String Sound and The Radio Orchestra Show. He was a prolific composer of library music for companies such as KPM, and his music has been used in numerous TV, film and radio productions.

== Early life ==
The son of a Worcestershire clergyman, Neil Richardson was born in Stourport-on-Severn, and grew up in the village of Hartlebury. Aged eight, he went to become a chorister at Westminster Abbey. After leaving the Abbey school, he became a music scholar at Lancing College, Sussex, and continued his musical studies at the Royal College of Music, studying clarinet, piano and composition with professor William Lloyd Webber. During his national service, he played solo clarinet with the band of the Royal Air Force at Cranwell.

== Career ==
After completing his national service, Richardson began a career as an arranger, writing and conducting for the BBC, particularly the then-numerous BBC Radio and concert orchestras. He was instrumental in creating the BBC Northern Radio Orchestra in 1975 and was its conductor for many years. He died in Nerja, Spain at the age of 80.

=== Compositions ===
As a composer, Richardson was best known for his library music – incidental music for use in films and television, for example his "Approaching Menace", used as the theme to Mastermind. In the 1960s, he often composed under the pseudonym "Oscar Brandenburg", a name he shared with Johnny Pearson and Alan Moorhouse, also well known in this area. For example, he co-composed the test card piece "Scotch Broth".

Another of his library music compositions, "The Riviera Affair" (aka "Prestige Production", from the 1970 KPM album Impact and Action, Vol. II), is best known to New Yorkers as the theme music for WOR-TV's late-afternoon movie program, The 4 O'Clock Movie, in the late 1970s and early 1980s. The song was also used as part of a homage of The 4 O'Clock Movie in the opening logo sequence for the 2007 heist film, Ocean's Thirteen. NFL Films also used some of his compositions in its American football highlight films. His library theme "Another Happening" was used for the 2012 BBC Scotland series Britain on Film, which featured footage from the Rank Organisation's 1960s Look at Life newsreels.

Richardson also orchestrated and conducted some of Richard Rodney Bennett's film music, such as for the 1994 film Four Weddings and a Funeral and Enchanted April. He also appeared as conductor in the 1980 album A Sure Thing, featuring Bennett's arrangements of Jerome Kern songs, alongside Bennett as piano soloist and French horn player Barry Tuckwell. He was also an arranger for numerous television productions including Agatha Christie's Poirot and The Charmer.
