= Lajos Kozma =

Hungarian opera singer (1938–2007)

Lajos Kozma (1938–2007) was a Hungarian operatic tenor, particularly associated with lyric Italian roles, baroque operas and oratorios.

Born on 2 September 1938 in Lepsény, Hungary, he studied at the Franz Liszt Academy in Budapest, and made his debut at the Budapest Opera in 1961 (as Malcolm), where he won considerable acclaim as Pelléas in Debussy's Pelléas et Mélisande. In 1963, he went to Italy to further his studies at the Accademia di Santa Cecilia in Rome, with Giorgio Favaretto and Franco Capuana. Beginning in 1964, he sang widely in Italy, appearing in Bologna, Venice, Florence, Trieste, Palermo, at the Rome Opera, at La Scala in Milan, and the San Carlo in Naples.

His career quickly became international with guest appearances at the Vienna State Opera, the Royal Opera House in London, La Monnaie in Brussels, Amsterdam, Copenhagen, and Philadelphia.

He also appeared at the Salzburg Festival and Aix-en-Provence Festival, notably as Ferrando in Così fan tutte. Other notable roles included Monteverdi's L'Orfeo (recorded with Nikolaus Harnoncourt), Vivaldi's Orlando furioso, and Stravinsky's Oedipus Rex. In addition, he created Renzo Rossellini's La Reine morte, at the Monte Carlo Opera in 1973.

In 1971, he appeared in a film version of Lucia di Lammermoor, opposite Anna Moffo, which has been released on DVD.

He died on 30 December 2007 in Pierantonio (Umbertide), Italy.

== Sources ==
- Operissimo.com
