= Daniel Benyamini =

Israeli violist

Daniel Benyamini (Hebrew: דניאל בנימיני; Tel Aviv, 1925–1993) was an Israeli violist, who studied at the Shulamit Conservatory.

He served as the Israel Philharmonic's principal violist (1960–1990), a chair he also held at the Orchestre de Paris under Daniel Barenboim. In addition, he was internationally active as a soloist and a chamber musician, and was a professor at the newly founded Escuela Superior de Música Reina Sofía for the two last years of his life.
