= Teresa Berganza =

Spanish mezzo-soprano (1933–2022)

The Most Excellent Teresa Berganza OAXS
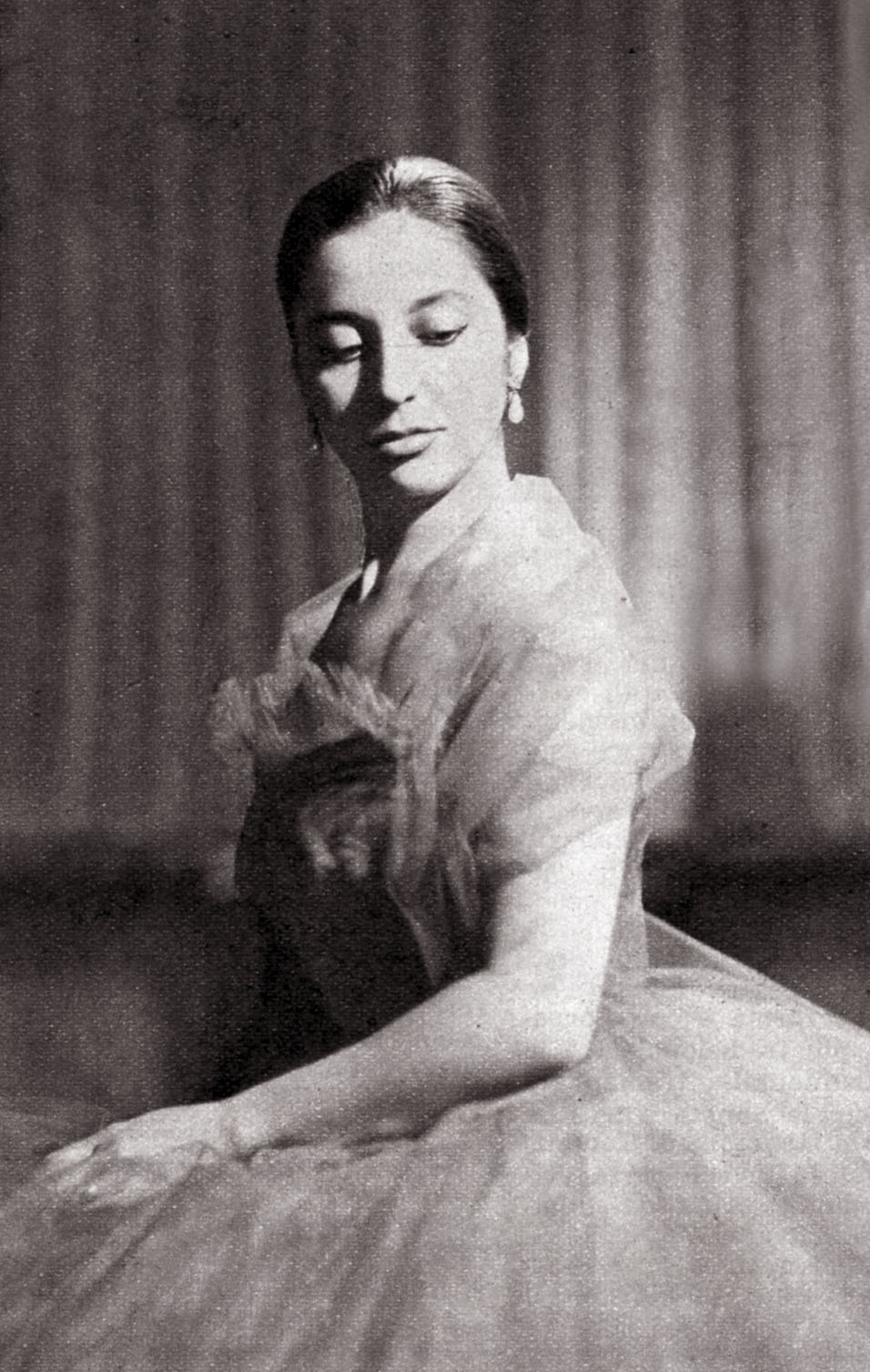
- Berganza in 1957
- Born: Teresa Berganza Vargas; 16 March 1933; Madrid, Spain
- Died: 13 May 2022 (aged 89); San Lorenzo de El Escorial, Spain
- Education: Madrid Royal Conservatory
- Occupations: Opera singer; Academic teacher
- Organization: Escuela Superior de Música Reina Sofía
- Spouse: Félix Lavilla (m. 1957; div. 1977)
- Awards: Prince of Asturias Award; Premio Nacional de Música; Civil Order of Alfonso X, the Wise; International Opera Awards

Teresa Berganza Vargas OAXS (16 March 1933 – 13 May 2022) was a Spanish mezzo-soprano. She is most closely associated with roles such as Rossini's Rosina and La Cenerentola, and later Bizet's Carmen, admired for her technical virtuosity, musical intelligence, and beguiling stage presence.

Berganza was a key singer in a Rossini renaissance which explored less-performed operas and restored the leading roles to mezzo register. She appeared as Zerlina in Joseph Losey's Don Giovanni film in 1979. She participated in the opening ceremonies of the Expo '92 in Seville and of the 1992 Summer Olympics in Barcelona.

== Life and career ==
Teresa Berganza was born in Madrid on 16 March 1933. She studied piano and voice at the Madrid Royal Conservatory, voice with Lola Rodríguez Aragón, where she was awarded first prize for singing in 1954. She made her concert debut in Madrid in 1955.

Berganza made her operatic debut as Dorabella in Mozart's Così fan tutte in 1957 at the Aix-en-Provence Festival. That same year, she made her La Scala debut. She first appeared at the Glyndebourne Festival in 1958, as Cherubino in Mozart's Le nozze di Figaro, and later also in the title role of Rossini's La Cenerentola. In 1959, Berganza made her first appearance at the Royal Opera House as Cherubino, and the following year performed there as Rosina in Rossini's Il barbiere di Siviglia, which became one of her signature roles. She repeated it at the Zürich Opera House, where she returned in 1979 as Charlotte in Massenet's Werther.

She appeared in the U.S. first in 1958, at the Dallas Opera as Isabella in Rossini's L'italiana in Algeri and then as Neris in Cherubini's Médée alongside Maria Callas in the title role. In 1967, she made her Metropolitan Opera debut, again as Cherubino, directed by Nikolaus Lehnhoff in his house debut, and conducted by Joseph Rosenstock, alongside Cesare Siepi as Figaro, Mirella Freni as Susanna, Tom Krause and Pilar Lorengar as the Almaviva couple. She returned for Rosina the following year, first in a telecast performance conducted by Richard Bonynge, alongside Mario Sereni as Figaro, Luigi Alva and Fernando Corena as Bartolo. A reviewer from the New York Daily News noted:

But the revival was really distinguished by the presence of Teresa Berganza as Rosina. The Spanish mezzo-soprano had not sung the role with the company before, although she has been a well-known recitalist here, and her way with Rossini's music is much admired. She is certainly the most charming Rosina at the Met since her compatriot Victoria de los Angeles. Like her, she sings the music in the low key, which makes it much more appealing to the ear than the constant chirping of coloratura sopranos one is usually subjected to. Short and dark, if not exactly petite, Miss Berganza is quite enchanting to look at, a pleasant if not volatile actress, and a singer of great style and skill. She lit the stage up whenever she was on it, without making any attempt to do so.

Berganza was a leading singer for a renaissance of Rossini's operas, returning the roles to the original lower register according to critical editions by Alberto Zedda, promoted by conductors such as Claudio Abbado and Charles Mackerras.

Berganza appeared at the 1977 Edinburgh Festival as Bizet's Carmen, conducted by Abbado, regarded as one of her greatest successes on stage, and repeated the role at the Paris Opera. She portrayed the character with intelligence, singing the Habanera with the flexibility of a lieder singer, and abrupt changes in timbre and dynamic, seemingly addressing the crowd but meaning one person, in a provokingly light tone demonstrating superiority.

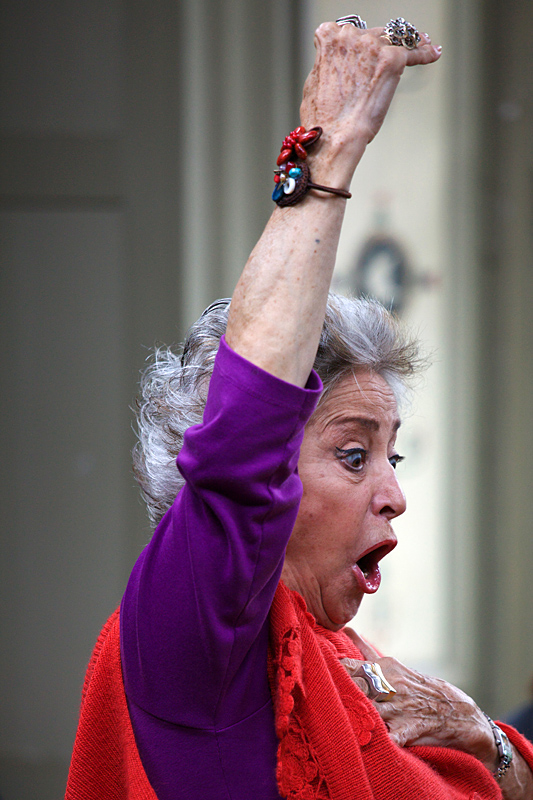
Teresa Berganza during a master class in May 2009

As a recitalist, Berganza made her Carnegie Hall debut in 1964. Her concert repertoire included Spanish, Italian, French, German, and Russian songs. From 1957 to 1977, Berganza was married to the composer and pianist Félix Lavilla, who accompanied her in recitals and recordings. The couple had three children, including soprano Cecilia Lavilla Berganza. She showcased Spanish repertoire, from medieval cantigas from the era of Alfonso X of Castile to miniatures by Manuel de Falla and Enrique Granados.

For the opening of the National Auditorium of Music in Madrid, she performed in De Falla's Atlántida alongside Montserrat Caballé and Vicente. She participated in the concert for the opening of the Opéra Bastille in Paris on 13 July 1989. In 1992, Berganza participated in the opening ceremonies of Expo '92 in Seville and the opening ceremonies of the 1992 Summer Olympics in Barcelona.

Berganza's stage career ended in 2008. She last taught singing at the Escuela Superior de Música Reina Sofía, continued to perform music of Spanish composers, and gave master classes all over the world. Her students have included María Bayo, Jorge Chaminé and Alicia Nafé.

Berganza died on 13 May 2022 in San Lorenzo de El Escorial at age 89.

== Films ==
Berganza appeared in nine motion pictures, including Il barbiere di Siviglia in 1972, as Zerlina in Joseph Losey's Don Giovanni in 1979, and both Massenet's Werther and Bizet's Carmen in 1980.

== Honours ==
Berganza received a Gold Medal of Merit in Fine Arts from the Kingdom of Spain on 26 February 1982. She shared the 1991 Prince of Asturias Award for arts and letters with six other Spanish singers. In 1994, she became the first woman elected to the Real Academia de Bellas Artes de San Fernando. In 1996, she was awarded the Premio Nacional de Música. She also received the Grand Prix Rossini. She was awarded the Dame Grand Cross of the Civil Order of Alfonso X, the Wise from the Kingdom of Spain on 3 May 2013. She received the Lifetime Achievement Award at the 2018 International Opera Awards.

== Discography ==
- Teresa Berganza (in Italian and French), 2016, OCLC 1004394623
- Teresa Berganza (in Italian and Spanish), Decca/Universal Classics, 2001, OCLC 50596731
- Teresa Berganza : Essentials (in French, Italian, Latin, and Spanish), 2020, OCLC 1251412141
- La leçon de chant de Teresa Berganza (in French), CLC Productions, 2003, OCLC 881548562
- Teresa Berganza (in Italian, French, and Latin), London/PolyGram, 1990, OCLC 49420257
- Teresa Berganza (in Italian), Decca/PolyGram, 1983, OCLC 57394368
- Teresa Berganza (in Spanish), EMI Classics, 2003, OCLC 768119222
- Teresa Berganza sings Rossini (in Italian), London/PolyGram, 1980, OCLC 7419479
- Canciones españolas (in Spanish), Deutsche Grammophon/PolyGram, 2007, OCLC 181089717
- Teresa Berganza Recital (in Italian), Decca/PolyGram, 1960, OCLC 37838083
- Teresa Berganza, mezzo-soprano (in Spanish), Claves, 1984, OCLC 718128048
- Brava Berganza! (in Spanish, Italian, and Basque), 2018, OCLC 1050870656
