= Iain Sutherland (conductor) =

British conductor (born 1936)

Iain Sutherland is a retired British conductor born in 1936. Previously he had been an orchestral and session violinist in London playing in the London Philharmonic Orchestra, Philharmonia, Royal Philharmonic Orchestra and English Chamber Orchestra.

He graduated with the Diploma of the Royal Scottish Academy of Music in 1956. He was the principal conductor of the BBC Radio Orchestra. In 1985, he made his 10th anniversary concert with the Hertford Symphony Orchestra. At the time, he also had his own freelance Iain Sutherland Orchestra.

In 2015, Sutherland was awarded the Gold Badge of Merit by the British Academy of Songwriters, Composers and Authors.

Broadcaster David Mellor, in reviewing Sutherland's album Great Classic Film Music (Somm, 2019) said:

There is no greater master of light music in these islands than Iain Sutherland

== Selected recordings ==
- "Sailing By-25 British Light Classics" (Alto) 2019
- "Dancing in Vienna" (Somm) 2025
