= Félix Lavilla =

Spanish musician (1928–2013)

Félix Lavilla Muñarriz (11 June 1928, Pamplona – 14 January 2013 Madrid) was a Spanish pianist, composer and a well-known accompanist, son of a music teacher and band master of the municipal band of Errenteria in Gipuzkoa, Basque Autonomous Community. He was perhaps best known for his collaborations with the mezzo-soprano Teresa Berganza, to whom he was married from 1957 to 1977. The couple regularly recorded and gave recitals together.
