= BBC Symphony Chorus =

British amateur chorus based in London

- Choir
- Also known as: BBCSC, BBC SC
- Former name: National Chorus (1928–1932); BBC Chorus (1932–1935); BBC Choral Society (1935–1977)
- Origin: London, United Kingdom
- Founded: 1928 (98 years ago)
- Genre: Classical
- Choirmaster: Neil Ferris
- Chief conductor: Sakari Oramo
- Manager: Sarah Mansfield
- Headquarters: Maida Vale Studios
- Concert hall: Barbican Centre; Royal Albert Hall
- Affiliation: British Broadcasting Corporation; BBC Proms; BBC Radio 3
- Associated groups: BBC Symphony Orchestra
- Website: bbc.co.uk

The BBC Symphony Chorus is a British amateur chorus based in London. It is the dedicated chorus for the BBC Symphony Orchestra, though it performs with other national and international orchestras.

== Brief history ==
=== Background ===
In its early years, the BBC worked on developing its choral output, founding the BBC Wireless Chorus, a professional chamber choir of 16, to supply the smaller scale needs. For bigger choral works, the BBC turned to outside organisations, which performed either under their own name, or under the title of "The National Chorus". Participating choruses included the Civil Service Choir, the Lloyds Choir, and the Railway Clearing House Male Voice Choir, which would perform en masse together with the Wireless Chorus. Holst's choral ballet The Morning of the Year has the distinction of having been the first piece of music to be commissioned by the music department of the newly formed British Broadcasting Corporation. Its first performance was as part of a concert given at the Royal Albert Hall by the National Chorus and Orchestra, which was broadcast live, on the evening of 17 March 1927.

=== Foundation ===
By 1928, the BBC had decided there was a need to develop a large amateur chorus of its own. Notices advertising the formation of The National Chorus were placed, auditions were held, a broadcast was delivered in August 1928 discussing the new choir and its upcoming programme, and the choir gave its first performance later that year in Granville Bantock's oratorio The Pilgrim's Progress. Stanford Robinson, already on the BBC's staff, was appointed Conductor. A condition of singing in the new choir was that the new member must already be a member of an existing choir. (Note: The Radio Times synopsis of the 1928 broadcast on the National Chorus, the new organisation and its first season's work reads as follows: READERS of The Radio Times will remember announcements of the new National Chorus, which is destined to provide a permanent, amateur chorus, the members of which will be at the same time members of the existing amateur choral societies, to perform in important works on a big scale. For some time it had been the custom to get together a chorus formed of parties drawn from some of the big London choral societies, who sang with the professional Wireless Chorus; but it was felt that the time had come to establish a permanent amateur chorus that could be called upon for the performance of the most important choral works. Ever since the announcement was made the work of giving auditions has been going on, although the actual selection will not begin until the last audition is over. In this evening's talk the full significance of this development, momentous in the history both of broadcasting and of choral singing – for permanent choirs of two hundred and fifty are not formed every day – will be explained, and the first season's work of the new organization will be outlined.)

Chorus Masters of the BBC Symphony Chorus

1.	Stanford Robinson	1928–1932
2.	Cyril Dalmaine	1932–1933
3.	Leslie Woodgate	1934–1961
4.	Peter Gellhorn	1961–1972
5.	John Poole	1968–1976 (Note: Responsibility for the BBC Choral Society was devolved to John Poole in 1968, but Peter Gellhorn carried on as official chorus director until 1972.)
6.	Brian Wright	1976–1984
7.	Gareth Morrell	1984–1988
8.	Stephen Jackson	1989–2015
9.	Neil Ferris	2017–

Its earliest concerts included the UK premiere of Mahler's Eighth Symphony (15 April 1930, under Sir Henry Wood), Beethoven's Missa Solemnis (17 December 1930), the London premiere of Walton's Belshazzar's Feast (25 November 1931, under Adrian Boult) and Stravinsky's Symphony of Psalms (27 January 1932, under Ernest Ansermet). The Missa Solemnis under the baton of Herman Scherchen on 17 December 1930 was the first performance of the Chorus with the new BBC Symphony Orchestra. Outstanding events in the following years included the premiere of Morning Heroes by Bliss, on 25 March 1931; and the British premiere of Hindemith’s oratorio Das Unaufhörliche, which Wood conducted on 22 March 1933. Also noted are performances under such conductors as Adrian Boult, Arturo Toscanini and Bruno Walter.

In 1932, Stanford Robinson was transferred to the BBC Theatre Orchestra, which he conducted for many years. He was succeeded briefly by Cyril Dalmaine, who took over in July 1932. In his autobiography, written under the pseudonym Jonah Barrington, Dalmaine said his appointment 'typifies one of the early weaknesses in BBC administration – the allocating of jobs to the lowest bidder'. It was plain that Dalmaine was not ideally suited to the job, and within two years he left the BBC, a victim (as he put it) of 'the BBC’s absorbed and all-pervading interest in man’s relations with woman' which was ‘at that time proverbial’.

=== Leslie Woodgate ===
The choir's name was changed in 1932 to The BBC Chorus, and again in 1935 to become the BBC Choral Society when a professional choir named the BBC Chorus was established. Leslie Woodgate held the post of chorus master from 1934 until he died in 1961. He was wholly dedicated to the work of preparing the Society for the many arduous engagements it undertook, and raised the choir from the position of being, as Sir Henry Coward told Woodgate in 1936, 'nearly as good as my Yorkshire choir' to being at least as good as the great, long-established choral societies of the north. Important performances of new works continued: on 11 April 1934 there was Holst's First Choral Symphony (which had been premiered in Leeds Town Hall in 1925), and on 28 November 1934 the British premiere of Stravinsky's Perséphone. In January 1935 Albert Coates conducted one of the Thirties’ curiosities: the Symphony in C minor by Yuri Shaporin. The BBC Choral Society took part in Bartók's Cantata Profana on 25 March 1936 under Boult; the London premiere of Vaughan Williams's Five Tudor Portraits on 27 January 1937; and, perhaps most remarkable of all, the British premiere of Busoni's Doktor Faust, which took place on 17 March 1937.

In 1939, Leslie Woodgate described the operation and function of the various BBC choirs, including the Choral Society, in an interview with The Musical Times. Under Leslie Woodgate, the Choral Society achieved maturity; and all accounts of the period agree that the occasions which marked that maturity were the concerts given at the end of the 1930s under the direction of Arturo Toscanini. When Toscanini was first persuaded to come to England, he would not consider working with an amateur chorus, but eventually he accepted the challenge of a performance of Beethoven's Ninth Symphony, Op. 125 (the "Choral") on 3 November 1937 with the BBC Choral Society. The Verdi Requiem on 27 May 1938 and Beethoven's Mass in D, Op. 123 (the Missa Solemnis) on 26 May 1939 were both performed under his direction in the following two years, in a series of concerts in the BBC's London Music Festival, which were the highlights of the capital's musical life in the pre-war years.

=== Second World War ===
The Second World War interrupted the activities of the BBC Choral Society as it did many other artistic ventures. The outbreak of war saw the evacuation of the BBC Symphony Orchestra to Bristol, and then (when that became intolerable because of air-raids) to Bedford. This led to the abandonment of the activities of the Society.

In August 1942, in war-time London, an entirely fortuitous meeting near the Albert Memorial took place between the Chorus Master Leslie Woodgate and Honorary Secretary, and the restarting of the Society was discussed. Dr R. S. Thatcher, the Assistant Director of Music at the BBC, became interested, and a meeting was called in December 1942, at which it was agreed that the chorus should not remain inactive, but that it should resume rehearsals. On the first Friday of January 1943, about one hundred members assembled for the first of the war-time rehearsals.

These Friday rehearsals were an ideal tonic for the members, and undoubtedly helped them very much in carrying on their arduous war-time labours. To Leslie Woodgate, already overburdened with work, they must have seemed almost the last straw, as he frequently had to travel long distances in order to conduct them. The members, indeed, owe him a debt of gratitude for his efforts during those trying times.

Then came the flying bombs. Rehearsals stopped, but after about six weeks it was decided to resume. During that period four of the members lost their lives.

=== Postwar ===
After the war, activities began again in earnest. Yuri Shaporin's On the Field of Kulikovo was another of the Russian works undertaken by the chorus in this period, on 7 November 1945, conducted by Albert Coates. To mark the 21st birthday of the BBC Choral Society in 1949, several special events took place, among them the first performance in London of a work by Leslie Woodgate, his oratorio Simon Peter. The following year, Adrian Boult, who had conducted many of the performances in the 1930s and 1940s as the BBC's Director of Music and Chief Conductor, reached retiring age and was not asked to remain with the corporation. In 1950 the post of Chief Conductor of the BBC Symphony Orchestra was given to Malcolm Sargent, and there began an era in which the performance of the great choral works became a particular feature of BBC concerts.

Sargent was especially devoted to choral music. His special skills with singers were well described by Bernard Shore (the former principal viola of the BBC Symphony Orchestra) in his book The Orchestra Speaks: 'He is able to instil into the singers a life and efficiency they never dreamed of. You have only to see the eyes of a choral society screwing into him like hundreds of gimlets, to understand what he means to them. He is hypnotic with the choir – he plays upon the imagination and minds of the singers like a mesmerist.' Under Sargent the emphasis in the Society's repertoire shifted from adventurous new continental works to the 20th-century compositions of British composers: Herbert Howells's Hymnus Paradisi, Vaughan Williams's Sea Symphony, Delius's Sea Drift, Ireland's These things shall be, along with the classics of the choral repertory such as Haydn's Creation, Beethoven's Ninth and the Missa Solemnis, Handel's Messiah. Premieres were fewer than before: significant works included Golgotha by Frank Martin and Hodie by Vaughan Williams. Important events included the ceremonial opening of the new Royal Festival Hall in 1951 (with a concert of English music by Thomas Arne, Handel and Hubert Parry) and a memorial concert for King George VI (Messiah with the Royal Choral Society).

While Leslie Woodgate continued to be Chorus Master of the BBC Choral Society, Sargent was succeeded as Chief Conductor of the BBC Symphony Orchestra by Rudolf Schwarz. This took place in 1957; Sargent continued to conduct the Society on many occasions (particularly at the Proms), but a change in direction was immediately apparent with the inclusion in programmes of such new works as The Bermudas by lain Hamilton (on 30 October 1957) and such (then) rare works as Monteverdi's Vespers of 1610 (on 20 October 1958). Schwarz also conducted Ulysses by Matyas Seiber for two concerts in December 1957. In 1958 the BBC Choral Society under Leslie Woodgate travelled to Aachen, where they gave an a cappella concert including Britten's Hymn to St Cecilia, and then went on to the Herkulesaal in Munich, where Handel's Messiah was performed.

=== 1960s ===
The arrival of William Glock at the BBC as Controller, Music, in 1959, had the same revolutionary effect on the BBC Choral Society as on every other department concerned with music. In addition, the Society suffered a sudden loss in 1961 with the death of Leslie Woodgate, who had guided it through 27 years of its existence. On 15 June 1961, a memorial concert was held, directed by Keith Falkner (who had been a soloist in the first concert in 1928) and by George Thalben-Ball. Peter Gellhorn took over the post of Chorus Master, which he held for some eleven years until 1972. Under the Glock regime new works began to re-assume a vital part in the Society's repertoire. On 1 August 1963 the London premiere of Britten's War Requiem (first performed the preceding year at Coventry Cathedral) was given, with Britten and Meredith Davies conducting. Later that year Alan Rawsthorne's Carmen Vitale was a choral commission; and at the beginning of 1963 the Society faced one of its greatest challenges, a new work by Hans Werner Henze called Novae de Infinito Laudes. This was given two performances under the composer's direction: on 17 March 1965, and again at the Proms on 27 August. Distinguished visitors in this period included Leopold Stokowski (in Mahler's Second Symphony). A return visit by Ernest Ansermet to conduct Honegger's King David had been planned to mark the 10th anniversary of Honegger's death, but Ansermet was ill and Sir Adrian Boult took over at short notice.

In what he described as 'an act of faith', Glock promoted in 1967 the first performance in England of the St Luke Passion by the Polish composer Krzysztof Penderecki – a modern re-working of the traditional large-scale Passion setting which made exceptional demands on the choir. The occasion was a great success, and was repeated in the Proms on 2 August 1967. A typical example of the extraordinary demands made on the chorus during the Proms each year was the succession of works performed during that season: in addition to the Penderecki, Mahler's Second Symphony, Walton's Belshazzar's Feast, Liszt's Faust Symphony, Berlioz's Grande Messe des Morts, Delius's Appalachia, Vaughan Williams's Serenade to Music, Schubert's E flat Mass and Beethoven's Ninth were all sung.

Under Antal Dorati, Chief Conductor of the BBC Symphony Orchestra from 1963 to 1967, the BBC Choral Society sang Mahler, a great deal of Stravinsky, some Britten, and much Beethoven. When Colin Davis took over in 1967, a new group of composers came to the fore: Berlioz, Liszt (the Dante Symphony as well as the Faust Symphony), and Michael Tippett. This last connection brought the BBC Choral Society its opportunity to make its first recording for a commercial company in recent years (though Mendelssohn's Elijah had been recorded as long ago as 1930): Tippett's oratorio A Child of Our Time was recorded under Davis's direction for Philips Classics Records. There followed a succession of major contemporary works: Voices of Night by Franz Reizenstein in 1969; La Transfiguration de Notre Seigneur Jésus-Christ by Messiaen at the first night of the Proms in 1970; and the Requiem by Gyorgy Ligeti in 1971.

=== 1970s ===
In 1971, Colin Davis departed to take up the post of Music Director at Covent Garden, and was succeeded by the composer and conductor Pierre Boulez. There was also a change of chorus master: in 1972 Peter Gellhorn was succeeded by John Poole, who directed several of the concerts in this period, including Dvořák's Te Deum and Bruckner's F minor Mass. The Boulez repertoire, as with the BBC Symphony Orchestra, was immediately distinctive: Schoenberg's Gurrelieder was given several performances, and became a commercial recording for CBS Records. Stravinsky, Ravel, Debussy and Mahler were prominently featured, while of the romantics Berlioz, Schumann (the Scenes from Goethe's Faust) and Brahms (the Requiem) all appeared more than once. During this period the Society sang under many guest conductors: the young Andrew Davis made his unexpected London debut with them in Janáček's Glagolitic Mass; Lorin Maazel returned to conduct some highly successful concerts; John Pritchard conducted several events including Rachmaninov's The Bells; and an increasingly large number of important occasions were undertaken by the Chorus Master, John Poole.

John Poole was entrusted with the world premiere of David Bedford's Twelve Hours of Sunset in 1975, and at the Alexandra Palace conducted two symphonies by Havergal Brian with the BBC Choral Society (who had already taken part in the giant Gothic Symphony by the same composer in a concert at the Albert Hall). Another first performance, that of Iain Hamilton's Epitaph for this world and time, performed before the traditional Beethoven's Ninth on the penultimate night of the Proms in 1975, proved one of the most complex undertakings of the BBC Choral Society, for the choir was split into three groups, and positioned around the arena in the Albert Hall. Both this, and another 1975 contemporary work, Mortales by Wilfred Josephs, were conducted by John Poole.

In 1976 the work of the BBC's professional choir, the BBC Singers, increased and John Poole gave up his work with the BBC Choral Society in order to concentrate on the BBC Singers' activities. Brian Wright, then took over as Chorus Master, and in the following year himself conducted the chorus in public in such works as Duruflé's Requiem, Kodály's Missa Brevis, and Gustav Holst's Choral Symphony.

In 1977, the Chorus adopted its current name of the BBC Symphony Chorus, in recognition of its status as a choir appearing in professional concerts under leading conductors, "with a repertory second to none". It made its first appearance under that name in the Sea Symphony by Ralph Vaughan Williams on 12 October 1977.

In September and October 1978 the Chorus travelled to the Festival of Flanders, appearing under the baton of the new Chief Conductor of the BBC Symphony Orchestra, Gennady Rozhdestvensky, as well as that of their Chorus Master Brian Wright. They sang the Mass in F minor and motets by Bruckner. Works performed later that same season in 1979 included Thea Musgrave's Five Ages of Man, Michael Tippett's Vision of St Augustine, as well as performances in the Royal Albert Hall of the B Minor Mass on 10 January 1979, conducted by Brian Wright, to mark the 50th Anniversary of the Chorus and Elgar's The Music Makers on 8 April 1979 to mark the 90th birthday of Sir Adrian Boult.

=== 1980s ===
Specialities such as Britten's Spring Symphony and Berlioz's The Trojans were added by Gennady Rozhdestvensky, and repertoire from Mozart's Requiem to Alexander Goehr’s Babylon the great is fallen (in 1983) under Sir John Pritchard, who was principal conductor the BBC Symphony Orchestra from 1982 to 1989. Other important premieres in this period included the European premiere of Tippett's The Mask of Time at the 1984 Proms, the first European performance of Roger Sessions's When Lilacs Last in the Dooryard Bloom'd at the 1985 Proms, and the British premiere of Penderecki's Polish Requiem (conducted by the composer) in 1986.

From 1984 to 1988 the director of the BBC Symphony Chorus was Gareth Morrell, who served in that capacity for a wide range of concert and recording projects with conductors such as Sir Colin Davis, Claudio Abbado, Lorin Maazel and Christoph von Dohnányi. With Seiji Ozawa he collaborated in performances of Olivier Messiaen's opera St Francis of Assisi in London and Berlin, and with Andrew Davis in performances of Sir Michael Tippett's Mask of Time, the recording of which has been critically acclaimed.

=== Stephen Jackson ===
The Chorus was directed from 1989 to 2015 by Stephen Jackson. In his time, he prepared a huge repertoire for more than fifty maestri, including Bernard Haitink, Pierre Boulez, Simon Rattle and Roger Norrington, and composer-conductors such as Luciano Berio and John Adams. Jackson regularly conducted the BBC Symphony Chorus himself, in the concert hall, on tour and in the recording studio. He particularly extended the range of the ensemble's large-scale a cappella choral repertoire, including Rachmaninov's Vespers (All-Night Vigil), Schoenberg's Friede auf Erden and Poulenc's Figure humaine; recorded works by Carl Rütti and Judith Bingham; and commissioned works by Richard Rodney Bennett, Mark-Anthony Turnage and Stephen Montague.

The BBC Symphony Chorus celebrated its 75th anniversary in 2003 with a number of concerts in London, and a week of special broadcasts of its most memorable performances of recent years as part of BBC Radio 3's Afternoon Performance (17-21 November 2003) presented by Tommy Pearson. The following works were included:

- Poulenc Figure Humaine BBC Symphony Chorus, conductor Stephen Jackson
- Schoenberg Friede auf Erden BBC Symphony Chorus, conductor Stephen Jackson
- Holst A Dirge for Two Veterans BBC Symphony Chorus, Wallace Collection, conductor Stephen Jackson
- Walton Belshazzar's Feast Alan Opie (baritone), BBC Symphony Chorus and Orchestra, conductor Leonard Slatkin
- Bingham Salt in the Blood BBC Symphony Chorus, London Gabrieli Brass Ensemble, conductor Stephen Jackson
- Byrd Laudibus in Sanctis BBC Symphony Chorus, conductor Stephen Jackson
- Schubert Mass in A flat, D687 Rosa Mannion (soprano), Stella Doufexis (mezzo), Toby Spence (tenor), Nathan Berg (bass), BBC Symphony Chorus and Orchestra, conductor Jiri Belohlavek
- Stravinsky King of the Stars BBC Symphony Chorus and Orchestra, conductor Pierre Boulez
- Bax Mater Ora Filium BBC Symphony Chorus, conductor Stephen Jackson
- MacMillan Quickening Hilliard Ensemble, Westminster Cathedral Choristers, BBC Symphony Chorus and Orchestra, conductor Andrew Davis
- Elgar The Music Makers Jean Rigby (mezzo), BBC Symphony Chorus and Orchestra, conductor Andrew Davis
- Rachmaninov The Bells Elena Prokina (soprano), Daniil Shtoda (tenor), Sergei Leiferkus (baritone), BBC Symphony Chorus and Orchestra, conductor Yevgeni Svetlanov
- Beethoven Missa Solemnis Karita Mattila (soprano), Catherine Wyn-Rogers (mezzo), Herbert Lippert (tenor), Anthony Michaels Moore (baritone), BBC Singers, BBC Symphony Chorus and Orchestra, conductor Bernard Haitink

Stephen Jackson's last concert with the BBC Symphony Chorus was part of the Barbican's Sound Unbound event on Saturday 31 October 2015, and included Judith Bingham's The Spirit of Truth and "the Mount Everest of classical choral music: the glorious 40-part motet", Thomas Tallis's Spem in alium. This is the only time the BBC Symphony Chorus has performed Spem in alium in public. By the end of his tenure, the BBC Symphony Chorus was regarded as one of the best amateur choruses in the world, singing challengingrepertoire.

=== Sir Andrew Davis ===
Sir Andrew Davis, conductor of the BBC Symphony Orchestra from 1989 to 2000, was President of the Chorus until his death in 2024. Appropriately enough, this appointment was announced through the medium of song by Davis himself at the Last Night of the Proms, 2000. (Note: The traditional Last Night speech included a reprise of "This is the Very Model of a Modern Music Festival", originally sung at the Last Night of the Proms, 1992, to the tune of Gilbert and Sullivan's "I am the Very Model of a Modern Major General". Sir Andrew proclaimed: If now you will allow me to be serious, not frivolous, To honour the participating artists would be chivalrous.. . . These concerts simply would not be the same were you not resident With Stephen Jackson's choristers, of whom I'm now the president. and the Chorus confirmed this three times in their refrain: Oh, well I never! He means us, and yes, he is the president. Oh, well I never! He means us, and yes, he is the president. Oh, well I never! He means us, and yes, he is the presi-president. Stephen Jackson was the Chorus Director at the time – it is "his choristers" who are singing with Sir Andrew, who was in turn appointed to be their president as a parting gift.)

Under Davis, the Chorus performed the major choral works of Elgar; the symphonies of Mahler; Berlioz's The Damnation of Faust and Romeo and Juliet; Walton's Belshazzar's Feast; Delius's A Song of the High Hills; and Tippett's The Mask of Time as well as The Vision of Saint Augustine, A Child of Our Time and The Midsummer Marriage.

== Notable events ==
=== Blue Peter ===
The Chorus took part in numerous Blue Peter Christmas shows and between 1983 and 2010. The grand finale of the traditional Blue Peter Christmas programme comprised the Chalk Farm Salvation Army Band and children from various schools, assisted by members of the BBC Symphony Chorus, marching "up the hill" and into the studio from the cold outside (lanterns in hand!) singing a Christmas carol around the Blue Peter Christmas tree. Two carols, "Hark! the Herald Angels Sing" and "O Come, All Ye Faithful", were sung in alternate years, except in 1998 when there was a one-off experiment with "O Little Town of Bethlehem". However, for the 2007 Christmas programme, leaving budgetary and studio constraints unspoken, Blue Peter decided on a change to the Christmas show format to host a party recognising the hard work and effort of young carers, relating to a recent Appeal. This event replaced the carol, and the Chorus was not required. In 2010 the closing carol was reinstated, featuring for one final time the Chalk Farm Salvation Army Band and members of the BBC Symphony Chorus, the last Christmas show before the programme moved to MediaCityUK.

The Chorus featured occasionally in other editions of Blue Peter, notably in the programme on Monday 12 March 1984 (edition 1888). To publicise a concert at St Luke's Church, Chelsea, for The Knightsbridge Fund in aid of the victims of the Harrods bombing, Blue Peter invited the Chorus to the studio to sing the hymn "All people that on earth do dwell" (Old Hundredth) conducted by Brian Wright, accompanied by the Chalk Farm Salvation Army Band, who had been playing outside Harrods.

Janet Ellis became a Blue Peter presenter in 1983. She was asked to audition with Chorus master Gareth Morrell and sing with the Chorus at the Last Night of the Proms on 14 September 1985.

Zöe Salmon was unwrapped from a giant present under the tree as a new presenter in the Christmas 2004 edition of Blue Peter. Shortly after her debut, she famously said "I’ll try anything once", which started a trend in her being asked to do dangerous or embarrassing things. Among consequent challenges, a generation on from Janet Ellis she was asked to learn how to sing, to audition with Chorus director Stephen Jackson, to attend piano and orchestral rehearsals in Maida Vale Studios and to sing with the Chorus in the Last Night of the Proms on 10 September 2005.

=== Prom at the Palace ===
In 2002 the Chorus performed at Buckingham Palace, as part of the Prom at the Palace which marked the Queen's Golden Jubilee celebrations. The BBC Symphony Orchestra and Chorus, under the baton of Sir Andrew Davis, formed the backbone of the concert, on 1 June 2002. The concert was broadcast live on BBC One television and BBC Radio 3, and released a month later on audio CD (EMI/Virgin Records) and DVD (BBC/Opus Arte).

The Queen and the Duke of Edinburgh returned the favour by attending a special BBC Proms concert celebrating the 50th Anniversary of Her Majesty's Coronation on 30 July 2003. Sir Andrew Davis conducted the BBC Symphony Orchestra and five massed choirs, including the BBC Symphony Chorus. Sofi Jeannin, future Chief Conductor of the BBC Singers, happened to be a member of the BBC Symphony Chorus at that time.

=== Not the Messiah ===
To commemorate the 40th anniversary of the original Monty Python television programme, the BBC Symphony Orchestra and Chorus conducted by John du Prez appeared alongside Eric Idle, Michael Palin, Terry Jones and Terry Gilliam in a remount of Not the Messiah (He's a Very Naughty Boy) at the Royal Albert Hall on 23 October 2009. It was produced by Geoff Foulkes and directed by Aubrey Powell. It was recorded for release for one night only on 25 March 2010 at digital cinemas across the UK and Ireland and distribution on DVD, and BBC Radio 3 also broadcast a recording of this performance on New Year's Day 2010.

=== The Dream of Gerontius ===
The Chorus has performed Elgar’s oratorio, The Dream of Gerontius, Op. 38, many times since it first performed it at the Queen's Hall, London, on 18 May 1931, conducted by Stanford Robinson.

A performance of the oratorio was given in the sixth-century St Irene's Church as part of the 1997 Istanbul International Music Festival. Leonard Slatkin conducted the BBC Symphony Orchestra and Chorus, with mezzo-soprano Jean Rigby, tenor John Aler and baritone Alan Opie.

A special performance of the oratorio was given from St Paul's Cathedral on 26 November 1997 to mark the 75th anniversary of the BBC. Andrew Davis conducted the BBC Symphony Orchestra and Chorus, with mezzo-soprano Catherine Wyn-Rogers, tenor Philip Langridge and bass Alastair Miles. The concert was broadcast live on BBC Two television and BBC Radio 3, and later released on VHS video (NVC Arts), whereupon it was heralded as "the most convincing modern interpretation of Gerontius", and DVD (Warner Music Vision). The Penguin Guide to Recorded Classical Music, 2008, gave its maximum four star rating to this DVD recording of The Dream of Gerontius, rating it as "the finest recorded Gerontius ever".

On 6 April 2014, another performance was given at the Barbican by Sir Andrew Davis conducting the BBC Symphony Orchestra and Chorus, with mezzo-soprano Sarah Connolly, tenor Stuart Skelton and bass David Soar, following a recording of the work for Chandos Records. The recording was the winner, choral category, in both the BBC Music Magazine Awards 2015, and the Gramophone Classical Music Awards 2015.

The Dream of Gerontius will be performed at the Barbican on 13 December 2024 as a tribute to Sir Andrew Davis, who died in April 2024.

== The Chorus today ==
Although normally associated with the BBC Symphony Orchestra, the Chorus does perform independently. Venues regularly visited include the Barbican Centre and the Royal Albert Hall. As the resident chorus at the BBC Proms, the Symphony Chorus usually performs both on the first and last night. It makes regular recordings for classical music station BBC Radio 3.

New works play a vital part in the life of the Chorus. They try to balance well-known scores with the challenges of newer or more difficult works. Premieres and commissions in recent years have included works by Peter Maxwell Davies, Dame Judith Weir, John Tavener, Hugh Wood and Anthony Payne. The level of the Chorus is widely acknowledged to be exceptional, with works in its repertoire so difficult as sometimes to be inaccessible to professionals. Rehearsals take place twice a week, and the Chorus has very high requirements, with selection being tough.

Neil Ferris was appointed as Chorus Director of the BBC Symphony Chorus from May 2017. Grace Rossiter was appointed as Deputy Chorus Director. The appointment of Helen MacLeod in the new position of Choruses Manager of the BBC Symphony Chorus and the BBC Proms Youth Choir was announced at the same time.

The BBC Symphony Chorus's 90th birthday season included concerts featuring Ethel Smyth's Mass in D, Berlioz's L'Enfance du Christ and Bach's B Minor Mass. Neil Ferris made his BBC Proms conducting debut in August 2019, celebrating the 90th anniversary season of the BBC Symphony Chorus with the premiere of Jonathan Dove’s specially commissioned piece We Are One Fire.

The final concert before the halting of the season owing to the COVID-19 pandemic in London was Beethoven's Missa Solemnis (4 March 2020), marking 250 years since the year of Beethoven's birth. In the last review of a BBC Symphony Chorus concert before the lockdown, Paul Driver said in the Sunday Times, "One was lost in admiration for the BBC Symphony Chorus, trained by Neil Ferris, in the BBC Symphony Orchestra’s account of the magnum opus at the Barbican, conducted by Donald Runnicles."

== Notable recordings ==
As well as featuring in dedicated studio recordings for BBC Radio 3, the BBC Symphony Chorus's discography consists of over 120 commercial recordings, many featuring collaborations with the BBC Symphony Orchestra. Recent commercial recordings include Brett Dean’s Vexations and Devotions under David Robertson; Szymanowski’s Stabat mater, Harnasie and Symphony No. 3 under Edward Gardner; and Holst's First Choral Symphony, Elgar's The Dream of Gerontius, Op. 38, and Berlioz's Romeo and Juliet (Roméo et Juliette), all under the baton of its President, Sir Andrew Davis.

In 2004 and 2005, Warner Classics released five new CDs each year of music recorded live at the Royal Albert Hall at the previous year's BBC Proms season, including the Last Night of the Proms. BBC Symphony Chorus contributions to these were as follows:

Disc title Composer and work	Soloists / Ensembles / Conductor	Label	Recorded / Released
First Night of the Proms 2003; Prokofiev Ivan the Terrible, Op. 116 – concert oratorio (ed. Stassevich)	James Rutherford bass Irina Tchistyakova mezzo Simon Russell Beale narrator / BBC National Chorus of Wales; BBC Symphony Orchestra and Chorus / Leonard Slatkin	Warner Classics 2564 61549‑2	18 July 2003 / July 2004
The Royal Prom 2003; Walton Coronation Te Deum	Choristers of Winchester Cathedral; Winchester College Quiristers; Members of Eton College Chapel Choir; BBC Singers; BBC Symphony Orchestra and Chorus / Sir Andrew Davis	Warner Classics 2564 61550‑2	30 July 2003 / July 2004
BBC Proms 2003; Stravinsky Perséphone	Nicole Tibbels narrator Paul Groves tenor / Trinity Boys Choir; Cantate Youth Chorus; BBC Symphony Orchestra and Chorus / Sir Andrew Davis	Warner Classics 2564 61548‑2	10 Aug 2003 / July 2004
Last Night of the Proms 2003; Borodin Prince Igor – Polovtsian Dances; various other items (Note: Full details of BBC Symphony Chorus contributions to the Last Night of the Proms 2003 CD follow: Borodin Prince Igor – Polovtsian Dances; Elgar Pomp and Circumstance March No. 1 in D major, Op. 39 No. 1; Fauré Pavane, Op. 50; Parry (orch. Elgar) Jerusalem; Henry Wood Fantasia on British Sea Songs (additional numbers arr. John Wilson, Percy Grainger, Stephen Jackson; Rule, Britannia! arr. Stephen Jackson))	BBC Singers; BBC Symphony Orchestra and Chorus / Leonard Slatkin	Warner Classics 2564 61552‑2	13 Sept 2003 / July 2004
BBC Proms 2004; Janácek Otcenáš (Our Father) for four-part choir, tenor soloist, organ and harp	Thomas Walker tenor Sioned Williams harp Thomas Trotter organ / BBC Symphony Chorus / Stephen Jackson	Warner Classics 2564 61951‑2	21 Aug 2004 / July 2005
BBC Proms 2004; Mussorgsky Pictures at an Exhibition	BBC Symphony Orchestra and Chorus / Leonard Slatkin	Warner Classics 2564 61954‑2	1 Sept 2004 / July 2005
Last Night of the Proms 2004; Vaughan Williams Five Mystical Songs; various other items (Note: Full details of BBC Symphony Chorus contributions to the Last Night of the Proms 2004 CD follow: Elgar Pomp and Circumstance March No. 1 in D major, Op. 39 No. 1; Parry (orch. Elgar) Jerusalem; Puccini Madama Butterfly – Humming Chorus; Gilbert and Sullivan The Mikado – ‘I’ve got a little list’ (with new lyrics by Kit Hesketh Harvey); Trad. National Anthem; Vaughan Williams Five Mystical Songs; Henry Wood Fantasia on British Sea Songs (additional numbers arr. Stephen Jackson; Rule, Britannia! arr. Stephen Jackson))	Sir Thomas Allen baritone Simon Preston organ / BBC Singers; BBC Symphony Orchestra and Chorus / Leonard Slatkin	Warner Classics 2564 61956‑2	11 Sept 2004 / July 2005

Chandos Records have released a series of recordings featuring the BBC Symphony Orchestra and Chorus in recent years, as follows:

Composer	Work	Conductor	Label	Recorded / Released
Howells	Hymnus Paradisi; A Kent Yeoman's Wooing Song premiere recording (Note: This was re-released in 2012 as CHAN 10727 X as part of a collection titled "Classic Chandos – The Hickox Legacy".)	Richard Hickox	CHAN 9744	1998 / 1999
Bernstein	Symphony No 3, ‘Kaddish’; Chichester Psalms	Leonard Slatkin	CHAN 10172	2003 / 2004.
Dyson	Nebuchadnezzar; O praise God in his holiness; Three Songs of Praise; Confortare	Richard Hickox	CHAN 10439	2006 / 2007
Bantock	Omar Khayyam	Vemon Handley	CHSA 5051	2007 / 2007
Foulds	A World Requiem	Leon Botstein	CHSA 5058	2007 / 2008
Marx	Herbstchor an Pan; Morgengesang; Berghymne; Ein Neujahrshymnus	Jiří Bĕlohlávek	CHAN 10505	2008 / 2009
Delius	Appalachia; A Song of the High Hills (Note: The full titles are – Appalachia, Variations on an Old Slave Song with Final Chorus for baritone, chorus and orchestra, revised and edited by Sir Thomas Beecham; and A Song of the High Hills for chorus and orchestra, edited by Sir Thomas Beecham.)	Sir Andrew Davis	CHSA 5088	2010 / 2011
Szymanowski	Stabat Mater, Op. 53; Harnasie, Op. 55	Edward Gardner	CHSA 5123	2013 / 2013
Holst	First Choral Symphony, Op. 41 H155	Sir Andrew Davis	CHSA 5127	2013 / 2013
Szymanowski	Symphony No. 3, ‘The Song of the Night’, Op. 27	Edward Gardner	CHSA 5143	2014 / 2014
Elgar	The Dream of Gerontius, Op. 38	Sir Andrew Davis	CHSA 5140	2014 / 2014
Sir Arthur Bliss	Morning Heroes, F. 32 (1930), A Symphony for Orator, Chorus, and Orchestra	Sir Andrew Davis	CHSA 5159	2015 / 2015
Berlioz	Roméo et Juliette, Op. 17 (1839); Chasse royale et orage (1857) (Royal Hunt and Storm)	Sir Andrew Davis	CHSA 5169	2015–6 / 2016
Sir Arthur Bliss	The Beatitudes, F. 28 (1961); God Save the Queen (1969) (The National Anthem)	Sir Andrew Davis	CHSA 5191	2017 / 2018
Elgar	The Music Makers; The Spirit of England	Sir Andrew Davis	CHSA 5215	2018 / 2018
Dame Ethel Smyth	Mass in D	Sakari Oramo	CHSA 5240	2019 / 2019
Sir Arthur Bliss	Mary of Magdala (1962–63)	Sir Andrew Davis	CHSA 5242	2019 / 2019
Tippett	A Child of Our Time	Sir Andrew Davis	CHSA 5341	2023 / 2024

The Sir Arthur Sullivan Society's new complete recording of Sullivan's The Light of The World was made at Watford Colosseum on 21–25 April 2017 and released on St Cecilia's day, 22 November 2018 (the anniversary of the composer's death). The BBC Symphony Chorus and BBC Concert Orchestra were conducted by John Andrews, with the Kinder Children's Choirs of the High Peak and soloists Natalya Romaniw, Eleanor Dennis, Kitty Whately, Robert Murray, Ben McAteer and Neal Davies.

Following a performance at the Barbican Centre on 13 October 2017, Martyn Brabbins recorded Vaughan Williams's Sea Symphony for Hyperion Records with the BBC Symphony Orchestra and Chorus, Elizabeth Llewellyn and Marcus Farnsworth. This was released by Hyperion on 28 September 2018, coupled with Darest thou now, O soul (1925) for unison chorus and strings.

A number of BBC Symphony Chorus recordings have received awards, including the following:

Composer	Work	Orchestra / Conductor	Label	Year	Award
Tippett	The Mask of Time	BBC Symphony Orchestra / Andrew Davis	EMI British Composers	1986	Gramophone Awards 1987 – Winner, Contemporary
Wagner	Götterdämmerung	Hallé Orchestra / Mark Elder	Hallé	2009	Gramophone Awards 2010 – Winner, Opera
Elgar	The Dream of Gerontius	BBC Symphony Orchestra / Sir Andrew Davis	Chandos Records	2014	BBC Music Magazine Awards 2015 – Winner, Choral category; Gramophone Classical Music Awards 2015 – Winner, Choral

== See also ==
- BBC Orchestras and Singers
