= A Sea Symphony =

Symphony composed by Ralph Vaughan Williams

First page of the full score to A Sea Symphony

A Sea Symphony is a work of just over an hour's length for soprano, baritone, chorus and large orchestra written by Ralph Vaughan Williams between 1903 and 1909. The first and longest of his nine symphonies, it was first performed at the Leeds Festival in 1910 with the composer conducting. It is one of the first symphonies in which a chorus is used throughout as an integral part of the texture and it helped set the stage for a new era of symphonic and choral music in Britain during the first half of the 20th century.

== Background ==
When Vaughan Williams was a young man the sea was a popular subject for composers. The biographer Michael Kennedy cites as examples Elgar's Sea Pictures (1899), Debussy's La mer (1905), Stanford's Songs of the Sea (1904), and Frank Bridge's The Sea (1911). Another inspiration for some British composers in the first half of the 20th century was the poetry of Walt Whitman, set by, among others, Stanford and Charles Wood and later Delius, Holst, and Hamilton Harty. Vaughan Williams was introduced to Whitman's work by Bertrand Russell while they were undergraduates at Cambridge. Although some of Vaughan Williams's early literary enthusiasms cooled in his later years he remained a lifelong admirer of Whitman. The musicologist Elliott Schwartz has commented that Vaughan Williams was particularly attracted to Whitman by tendencies that are paralleled in his music: "the concern for the development of a national art independent of foreign influences and the recurring theme of mysticism and exploration". The music critic of The Times wrote, "poet and composer are marvellously akin".

In 1903 Vaughan Williams began to sketch a Whitman choral work tentatively called "Songs of the Sea". The musicologist Alain Frogley comments that the finished work reflects several influences in Vaughan Williams's early development: "a disparate range of styles and influences, the latter including Brahms (Ein deutsches Requiem in particular), Parry, Stanford, Elgar, Wagner, Tchaikovsky and (to a lesser extent) Debussy and Ravel, along with folk-song and hints of Tudor music". The work evolved into A Sea Symphony, but before that was completed Vaughan Williams composed Toward the Unknown Region, setting an 1868 poem from Whitman's Whispers of Heavenly Death. This setting, for chorus and orchestra, was well received at its premiere during the 1907 Leeds Festival.

During the six-year gestation of the symphony it took various forms. For a while Vaughan Williams labelled it "The Ocean Symphony". The scherzo and slow movement were sketched first, followed by parts of the first movement and finale. In 1906 the composer wrote a movement for baritone and women's chorus called "The Steersman", but discarded it. The final four-movement version used lines from three of Whitman's poems in his collection Leaves of Grass: "Sea Drift", "Song of the Exposition" and "Passage to India".

== Premiere ==
The composer conducted the first performance, which was given at the Leeds Festival in 1910, with the festival's orchestra and chorus and the soloists Cicely Gleeson-White and Campbell McInnes. It was a considerable success. The Times commented, "It will not be surprising if the Festival of 1910 is remembered in the future as 'the Festival of the Sea Symphony' just as that of 1904 is remembered as 'the Everyman Festival' or that of 1886 as 'the Golden Legend year'.”

== Structure ==
At just over an hour A Sea Symphony is the longest of Vaughan Williams's nine symphonies. Although it represents a departure from the traditional Germanic symphonic tradition of the time, it follows a fairly standard symphonic outline: fast introductory movement, slow movement, scherzo, and finale. Frogley writes that the work's status as a true symphony has been disputed, "and it is certainly a hybrid work in terms of genre, combining elements of symphony, oratorio and cantata". He adds that the work is more fully choral than, for example, Mahler's symphonies with voices: "the choir or soloists are heard virtually throughout; this necessarily dilutes its ability to pursue some more traditionally symphonic processes". The analyst David Cox writes that the work is symphonic: "The shape of the first movement … is governed by the words, but is recognizably in sonata form, with first and second subjects, development and recapitulation. Similarly, the slow movement is in ternary form".

The four movements are:

1. A Song for All Seas, All Ships (baritone, soprano, and chorus)
2. On the Beach at Night, Alone (baritone and chorus)
3. Scherzo: The Waves (chorus)
4. The Explorers (baritone, soprano, semi-chorus, and chorus)

The first movement lasts roughly twenty minutes, the inner movements approximately eleven and eight minutes, and the finale roughly thirty minutes.

== Text ==
Vaughan Williams set sections from the following poems in A Sea Symphony:

* Movement 1: "Song of the Exposition" and "Song for all Seas, all Ships"

Behold, the sea itself,
And on its limitless, heaving breast, the ships;
See, where their white sails, bellying in the wind, speckle the green and blue,
See, the steamers coming and going, steaming in or out of port,
See, dusky and undulating, the long pennants of smoke.

1 To-day a rude brief recitative,
Of ships sailing the seas, each with its special flag or ship-signal,
Of unnamed heroes in the ships—of waves spreading and spreading far as the eye can reach,
Of dashing spray, and the winds piping and blowing,
And out of these a chant for the sailors of all nations,
Fitful, like a surge.

Of sea-captains young or old, and the mates, and of all intrepid sailors,
Of the few, very choice, taciturn, whom fate can never surprise nor death dismay.
Pick'd sparingly without noise by thee old ocean, chosen by thee,
Thou sea that pickest and cullest the race in time, and unitest nations,
Suckled by thee, old husky nurse, embodying thee,
Indomitable, untamed as thee. ...

2 Flaunt out O sea your separate flags of nations!
Flaunt out visible as ever the various ship-signals!
But do you reserve especially for yourself and for the soul of man one flag above all the rest,
A spiritual woven signal for all nations, emblem of man elate above death,
Token of all brave captains and all intrepid sailors and mates,
And all that went down doing their duty,
Reminiscent of them, twined from all intrepid captains young or old,
A pennant universal, subtly waving all time, o'er all brave sailors,
One flag, one flag above all the rest.
Behold, the sea itself,
And on its limitless heaving breast, the ships
All seas, all ships.

* Movement 2: "On the Beach at Night Alone"

On the beach at night alone,
As the old mother sways her to and fro singing her husky song,
As I watch the bright stars shining, I think a thought of the clef of the universes and of the future.

A vast similitude interlocks all, ...
All distances of place however wide,
All distances of time, ...
All souls, all living bodies though they be ever so different, ...
All nations, ...
All identities that have existed or may exist ...,
All lives and deaths, all of the past, present, future,
This vast similitude spans them, and always has spann'd,
And shall forever span them and compactly hold and enclose them.

* Movement 3: "After the Sea-ship", (taken in its entirety):

After the sea-ship, after the whistling winds,
After the white-gray sails taut to their spars and ropes,
Below, a myriad myriad waves hastening, lifting up their necks,
Tending in ceaseless flow toward the track of the ship,
Waves of the ocean bubbling and gurgling, blithely prying,
Waves, undulating waves, liquid, uneven, emulous waves,
Toward that whirling current, laughing and buoyant, with curves,
Where the great vessel sailing and tacking displaced the surface,
Larger and smaller waves in the spread of the ocean yearnfully flowing,
The wake of the sea-ship after she passes, flashing and frolicsome under the sun,
A motley procession with many a fleck of foam and many fragments,
Following the stately and rapid ship, in the wake following.

* Movement 4: "Passage to India"

5 O vast Rondure, swimming in space,
Cover'd all over with visible power and beauty,
Alternate light and day and the teeming spiritual darkness,
Unspeakable high processions of sun and moon and countless stars above,
Below, the manifold grass and waters, animals, mountains, trees,
With inscrutable purpose, some hidden prophetic intention,
Now first it seems my thought begins to span thee.

Down from the gardens of Asia descending ...,
Adam and Eve appear, then their myriad progeny after them,
Wandering, yearning, ..., with restless explorations,
With questionings, baffled, formless, feverish, with never-happy hearts,
With that sad incessant refrain, Wherefore unsatisfied soul? ...
Whither O mocking life?

Ah who shall soothe these feverish children?
Who Justify these restless explorations?
Who speak the secret of impassive earth? ...

Yet soul be sure the first intent remains, and shall be carried out,
Perhaps even now the time has arrived.

After the seas are all crossed, (...)
After the great captains and engineers have accomplished their work,
After the noble inventors, ...
Finally shall come the poet worthy that name,
The true son of God shall come singing his songs.

8 O we can wait no longer,
We too take ship O soul,
Joyous we too launch out on trackless seas,
Fearless for unknown shores on waves of ecstasy to sail,
Amid the wafting winds, (thou pressing me to thee, I thee to me, O soul,)
Caroling free, singing our song of God,
Chanting our chant of pleasant exploration.

O soul thou pleasest me, I thee,
Sailing these seas or on the hills, or waking in the night,
Thoughts, silent thoughts, of Time and Space and Death, like waters flowing,
Bear me indeed as through the regions infinite,
Whose air I breathe, whose ripples hear, lave me all over,
Bathe me O God in thee, mounting to thee,
I and my soul to range in range of thee.

O Thou transcendent,
Nameless, the fibre and the breath,
Light of the light, shedding forth universes, thou centre of them, ...

Swiftly I shrivel at the thought of God,
At Nature and its wonders, Time and Space and Death,
But that I, turning, call to thee O soul, thou actual Me,
And lo, thou gently masterest the orbs,
Thou matest Time, smilest content at Death,
And fillest, swellest full the vastnesses of Space.

Greater than stars or suns,
Bounding O soul thou journeyest forth; ...

9 Away O soul! hoist instantly the anchor!
Cut the hawsers—haul out—shake out every sail! ...

Sail forth—steer for the deep waters only,
Reckless O soul, exploring, I with thee, and thou with me,
For we are bound where mariner has not yet dared to go, ...

O my brave soul!
O farther farther sail!
O daring joy, but safe! are they not all the seas of God?
O farther, farther, farther sail!

== Music ==
=== Instrumentation ===
The symphony is scored for soprano, baritone, chorus and a large orchestra consisting of:

- Woodwinds: two flutes, piccolo, two oboes, cor anglais, two clarinets, E♭ clarinet, bass clarinet, two bassoons, contrabassoon
- Brass: four horns, three trumpets, three trombones, tuba
- Percussion: timpani (F♯_{2}–F_{3}), side drum, bass drum, triangle, suspended cymbal, crash cymbals
- Organ (1st and 4th movements)
- Strings: two harps, and strings.

This work may also be played by a reduced orchestra, omitting any or all of the following: flute 3/piccolo, oboe 2, clarinet in E♭, bass clarinet in B♭, contrabassoon, harp 2, organ. The chorus sings in all four movements. Both soloists are featured in the first and last movements; only the baritone sings in the second movement. The scherzo is for the chorus and orchestra alone.

=== Motives ===
Musically, A Sea Symphony contains two strong unifying motives. The first is the harmonic motive of two chords (usually one major and one minor) whose roots are a third apart. This is the first thing that occurs in the symphony; the brass fanfare is a B♭ minor chord, followed by the choir singing the same chord, singing Behold, the sea. The full orchestra then comes in on the word sea, which has resolved into D major.

The second motive is a melodic figure juxtaposing duplets and triplets, set at the opening of the symphony (and throughout the first movement) to the words And, on its limitless heaving breast... In the common method of counting musical rhythms, the pattern could be spoken as 'one two-and three-two-three four', showing that the second beat is divided into quavers (for on its) and the third beat is divided into triplets (for limitless).

== Reception and legacy ==
Hugh Ottaway's 1972 book Vaughan Williams Symphonies presents the following observation in its introduction:

The English symphony is almost entirely a twentieth-century creation. When in 1903 Vaughan Williams began to sketch the songs for chorus and orchestra that became A Sea Symphony, Elgar had not yet emerged as a symphonist. And, extraordinary though it may seem, Elgar's First (1908) is the earliest symphony by an English composer in the permanent repertory ... By the time Vaughan Williams had completed his Ninth [Symphony] – in 1958, a few months before his death at the age of 85 – the English symphony ... had become a central figure of our musical revival. To say that Vaughan Williams played a major part in bringing this about is to state the obvious: throughout much of the period he was actively involved in English musical life, not only as a composer but as teacher, conductor, organiser and, increasingly, adviser to younger men.

In the Grove article on Vaughan Williams, Ottaway and Alain Frogley call the work:

...a triumph of instinct over environment. The tone is optimistic, Whitman's emphasis on the unity of being and the brotherhood of man comes through strongly, and the vitality of the best things in it has proved enduring. Whatever the indebtedness to Parry and Stanford, and in the finale to Elgar, there is no mistaking the physical exhilaration or the visionary rapture.

== Recordings ==
The first recording of the symphony was made by Decca Records in December 1953 and January 1954 at the Kingsway Hall, conducted by Adrian Boult. It was produced by John Culshaw under the supervision of the composer and was released in March 1954 as LP LXT2907-08. Boult also conducted the first stereophonic recording of the work, made by HMV at the Kingsway Hall in September 1968 and released in December of that year.

Conductor	Orchestra	Chorus	Soprano	Baritone	Year
Adrian Boult	London Philharmonic Orchestra	London Philharmonic Choir	Isobel Baillie	John Cameron	1954
Malcolm Sargent	BBC Symphony Orchestra	BBC Choral Society; BBC Chorus; Christchurch Harmonic Choir	Elaine Blighton	John Cameron	1965
Adrian Boult	London Philharmonic	London Philharmonic Choir	Sheila Armstrong	John Carol Case	1968
André Previn	London Symphony Orchestra	London Symphony Chorus	Heather Harper	John Shirley-Quirk	1970
Kazuyoshi Akiyama	Osaka Philharmonic Orchestra	Kobe College Faculty of Music; Doshisha Glee Club; Osaka Men's Chorus	Sakae Himoto	Koichi Tajiona	1973
Gennady Rozhdestvensky	USSR Ministry of Culture Symphony Orchestra	Leningrad Musical Society Choir; Rimsky-Korsakov Musical School Choir	Tatiana Smoryakova	Boris Vasiliev	1988
Vernon Handley	Royal Liverpool Philharmonic	Liverpool Philharmonic Choir	Joan Rodgers	William Shimell	1988
Richard Hickox	Philharmonia Orchestra	London Symphony Chorus	Margaret Marshall	Stephen Roberts	1989
Bernard Haitink	London Philharmonic	London Philharmonic Choir	Felicity Lott	Jonathan Summers	1989
Bryden Thomson	London Symphony	London Symphony Chorus	Yvonne Kenny	Brian Rayner Cook	1989
Leonard Slatkin	Philharmonia	Philharmonia Chorus	Benita Valente	Thomas Allen	1992
Andrew Davis	BBC Symphony	BBC Symphony Chorus	Amanda Roocroft	Thomas Hampson	1994
Leonard Slatkin	BBC Symphony	BBC Symphony Chorus; Philharmonia Chorus	Joan Rodgers	Simon Keenlyside	2001
Robert Spano	Atlanta Symphony Orchestra	Atlanta Symphony Chorus	Christine Goerke	Brett Polegato	2001
Paul Daniel	Bournemouth Symphony Orchestra	Chorus	Joan Rodgers	Christopher Maltman	2002
Richard Hickox	London Symphony	London Symphony Chorus	Susan Gritton	Gerald Finley	2006
Howard Arman	MDR Sinfonie-Orchester	MDR Rundfunkchor	Geraldine McGreevy	Tommi Hakala	2007
Mark Elder	The Hallé	Hallé Choir	Katherine Broderick	Roderick Williams	2014
Martyn Brabbins	BBC Symphony	BBC Symphony Chorus	Elizabeth Llewellyn	Marcus Farnsworth	2017
Andrew Manze	Royal Liverpool Philharmonic	Liverpool Philharmonic Choir	Sarah Fox	Mark Stone	2017
Dennis Russell Davies	MDR Sinfonieorchester	MDR Rundfunkchor	Eleanor Lyons	Christopher Maltman	2022

Source: Naxos Music Library
