= Emmanuel Trenque =

French choir conductor

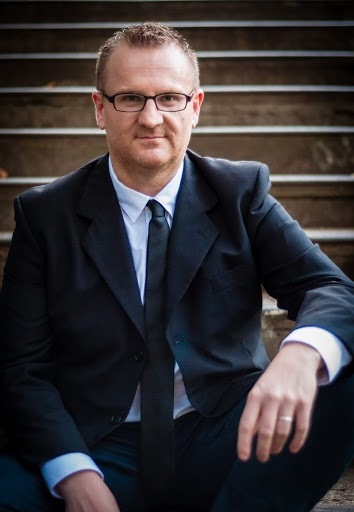
Emmanuel Trenque

Emmanuel Trenque is a contemporary French choir conductor.

== Biography ==
A titular of the DNESM (Diplôme National d'Études Supérieures Musicales) of choir direction of the Lyon Conservatory, Emmanuel Trenque studied piano, accompaniment, solfeggio, harmony and singing at the Toulouse Conservatory. In 2000, he was appointed choral conductor and responsible for musical studies of the vocal ensemble of the "Institut des arts et musiques sacrés" of Toulouse (IAMS) where he directed, among others, the Requiem by Maurice Duruflé, the Petite messe solennelle by Rossini, the Sécheresses cantata by Francis Poulenc, the Ich hatte viel Bekümmernis cantata BWV 21 by J.S. Bach, the Deutsche Messe by Franz Schubert. He led this formation for 3 seasons. Between 2001 and 2003, he worked at the Théâtre du Capitole as invited chef de chant (The Merry Widow by Franz Lehár and The Little Sweep by Benjamin Britten) but also a pianist and choir repetitionist for 4 months.

In 2003, he was hired as trainee singing conductor at the Centre de formation lyrique of the Paris Opéra where he worked in particular with Janine Reiss, Teresa Berganza, José Van Dam. In 2004, he won the Bösendorfer Prize at the Belvedere International Competition (awarding the best vocal conductor).

These were then his beginnings as a vocal conductor for the greatest Parisian houses (Opéra national de Paris, Théâtre des Champs-Élysées, Opera-Comique) before being invited to join the Grand Théâtre de Tours in September 2004 as a vocal conductor.

Since 2005, Emmanuel Trenque has been the choir conductor of the Opera of Tours. He regularly directs the symphonic orchestra of the Centre-Val de Loire-Tours region, in the pit (The Rape of Lucretia by Britten, Mozart by Reynaldo Hahn, Passionnément by Messager, ...) but also the symphonic repertoire and the oratorio. He participates in contemporary creation with HoMo XeRox (opéra by Claude Lenners) and La sortie d'Égypte (oratorio by Jean-Luc Defontaine, of which he is the dedicatee), two works he premiered in Tours. In addition, he strengthened and perfected the choir's participation in school concerts, for young people, in hospitals and prisons, in a very wide repertoire ranging from the great opera choirs to Broadway's "musicals", and in 2009 he created a concert, on tour, entitled Musique pour les Bêtes … pas trop bêtes !.

He has also been musical director of the Maîtrise of the Opéra of Tours since 2007. (Carmen by Bizet, Die Zauberflöte by W.A. Mozart, Mireille by Gounod, Tosca and La Bohème by Puccini) including the stage creation of the opera for children La Malle Magique by Pierre Uga. With the choir and the mastership of the Opera of Tours, he took part, as head of choral studies, in the recording of the opera Le Cœur du Moulin by Déodat de Séverac, for timpani.

He is regularly invited to the Théâtre des Champs-Élysées as choir conductor and assistant to the musical direction. (Falstaff by Giuseppe Verdi and Cosi fan tutte by Mozart in 2008, Semele by Haendel in 2010). He was also called upon to ensure the choir coordination and the assistance of Myung-Whun Chung at the Chorégies d'Orange for La Traviata by Verdi in 2009.

He returned to the Chorégies en 2011 for Aïda and Rigoletto / in 2012 for la Bohème and Turandot / in 2013 for Un ballo in maschera / in 2014 for Nabucco and Otello.

His professional activities gave him the opportunity to collaborate with Michel Plasson, Myung-Whun Chung, Pinchas Steinberg, Jean-Yves Ossonce, Alain Altinoglu, Jean-Christophe Spinosi, René Jacobs, Thomas Hengelbrock, Evelino Pidò, Jean-Claude Casadesus, and Christophe Rousset.

Among his latest engagements, he played the pianoforte, for Così Fan Tutte, on the new season opening production of the Opera of Tours in October 2014, and conducted several concerts of the Choirs of the Opera of Tours ("Autour d'Orphée" in November 2014 and "Autour de Compositeurs Britanniques" in March 2015). He conducted the Orchestre Symphonique Région Centre Tours, with choirs of high school students from the Région Centre in April 2015 (Magnificat(s) by Zelenka, Schubert & Vivaldi), and he was, again, at the Choréphies d'Orange in the summer of 2015 to ensure the choral coordination and the assistanat at the music direction of Carmen & Il Trovatore.

Emmanuel Trenque is the great-great-grandson of Amédée Gastoué, composer, choral singing teacher and musicologist.
