= Morning Heroes =

- by Arthur Bliss
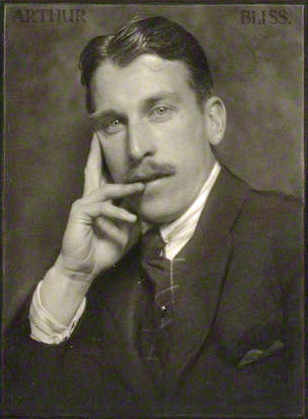
- Arthur Bliss c. 1922
- Genre: Choral symphony
- Text: Homer, Walt Whitman, Wilfred Owen, Li Tai Po, Robert Nichols
- Language: English
- Dedication: To the memory of Francis Kennard Bliss and all other comrades killed in battle

Morning Heroes is a choral symphony by the English composer Arthur Bliss. The work received its first performance at the Norwich Festival on 22 October 1930, with Basil Maine as the speaker/orator. Written in the aftermath of World War I, in which Bliss had performed military service, Bliss inscribed the dedication as follows: "To the Memory of my brother Francis Kennard Bliss and all other Comrades killed in battle."

The work sets various poems:

- Homer, The Iliad, passages from Book VI (translation of W Leaf) and Book XIX (translation of Chapman)
- Walt Whitman, "Drum Taps"
- Wilfred Owen, "Spring Offensive"
- Li Tai Po
- Robert Nichols, "Dawn on the Somme"

The extracts are spoken by a narrator and sung by a large choir. Juxtaposing the harsh images of trench warfare with the epic heroes of Ancient Greece, the parallels Bliss draws are essentially romantic, and the work as a whole has been criticised as being rather complacent. Bliss himself said that he suffered from a repeating nightmare about his war experiences and that the composition of Morning Heroes helped to exorcise this.

== Movements ==
The work falls into five sections, in the structure of a palindrome, with the first movement acting as a prologue, then fast, slow, and fast movements, and the final movement acting as an epilogue. The work includes the respective texts.:

1. "Hector's Farewell to Andromache"
2. "The City Arming"
3. "Vigil" – "The Bivouac's Flame"
4. "Achilles goes to battle" – "The Heroes"
5. "Now, Trumpeter, For Thy Close" – "Spring Offensive" - "Dawn on the Somme"

== Recordings ==
- SOMM: Donald Douglas, speaker; BBC Chorus; BBC Choral Society; Alexandra Choir; Croydon Philharmonic Society; BBC Symphony Orchestra; Sir Arthur Bliss, conductor; live recording, BBC Proms, Royal Albert Hall, London, 16 August 1968.
- EMI Classics: John Westbrook, speaker; Royal Liverpool Philharmonic Orchestra and Choir; Sir Charles Groves, conductor; studio recording, 23 & 24 July 1974, Philharmonic Hall, Liverpool.
- BBC Radio Classics: Richard Baker, speaker; BBC Symphony Chorus; BBC Symphony Orchestra; Sir Charles Groves, conductor; BBC Invitation Concert, Maida Vale Studios, London, 29 March 1985.
- Cala: Brian Blessed, speaker; East London Chorus, Harlow Chorus, East Hertfordshire Chorus; London Philharmonic Orchestra; Michael Kibblewhite, conductor; studio recording, All Hallows Church, Gospel Oak, London, 16-17 November 1991 & 26 January 1992.
- Chandos: Samuel West, speaker; BBC Symphony Chorus; BBC Symphony Orchestra; Sir Andrew Davis, conductor; studio recording, Fairfield Halls, Croydon, 16-17 May 2015.
