= Bill Barclay (Artistic director) =

American director, composer, writer, actor, and producer

Bill Barclay (born November 11, 1980) is an American director, composer, writer, actor, and producer. He was director of music at Shakespeare's Globe from 2012 to 2019. He is the founder of Concert Theatre Works and became artistic director of Music Before 1800 in 2022.

== Early life and education ==
Barclay graduated from Weston High School in 1999 and double-majored in music and theater at Vassar College. He graduated from Vassar in 2003 and received a Master of Fine Arts degree in music from Boston University in 2006.

== Career ==
Barclay spent 10 seasons at Shakespeare & Company, including as resident music director, and was in the acting company of the Mercury Theatre. He also worked with Actors' Shakespeare Project.

From 2012 to 2019, he was director of music at Shakespeare's Globe in London. His seven years there spanned 130 productions. He was composer for Hamlet Globe-to-Globe, which toured to every country in the world. He was UK music supervisor for Farinelli and the King.

In 2019, Barclay founded Concert Theatre Works. The Chevalier, his project about the life and music of Joseph Bologne, Chevalier de Saint-Georges, was commissioned by the Boston Symphony Orchestra in 2018 and debuted at Tanglewood in 2019. It was performed at St Martin-in-the-Fields with the London Philharmonic Orchestra.

In 2019, Barclay created Let Nature Sing with folk singer Sam Lee. The song was made entirely of birdsong. It debuted at number 18 on the UK Pop Charts.[24]

In 2021, Barclay created Secret Byrd, a staged concert featuring the Gesualdo Six. In 2024, Barclay directed a staged concert of Markus Passion, a lost work by J. S. Bach, produced by Concert Theatre Works. Its world premiere was in New York in April 2025.

In 2022, Barclay became artistic director of Music Before 1800, its first artistic director and only its second artistic director overall. He programs and oversees its performances of early music.

Barclay's concert version of Edvard Grieg's Peer Gynt was performed with the Boston Symphony Orchestra in March 2024. It has also been performed with the St. Louis Symphony Orchestra.

His publications on the music of Shakespeare include Shakespeare, Music and Performance (Cambridge University Press, 2017), co-edited with David Lindley, and a chapter in The Oxford Handbook of Shakespeare and Music (2022).
