= Owain Park =

English conductor and composer (born 1993)

Owain Park (born 1993) is an English conductor and composer who founded The Gesualdo Six in 2014, serving as its artistic director and bass singer.

== Early life and education ==
Park was born in 1993 in Bristol. He studied the piano as a child before becoming a chorister at St Mary Redcliffe church. He later studied the organ and trumpet, and became senior organ scholar at Wells Cathedral before studying music at Trinity College, Cambridge where he gained an MA in composition.

In 2010 he won the "under 18" Composer's Award of the National Centre for Early Music, and was short-listed in Waverley Care's "Sing a New Song" Christmas carol composition competition.

== Career ==
He is the founder and musical director of vocal group the Gesualdo Six.

He is composer-in-residence of the London Choral Sinfonia.

His compositions have been performed by ensembles including the Tallis Scholars and the Aurora Orchestra.

In July 2025, the BBC announced that he would become chief conductor of the BBC Singers in autumn 2026, succeeding Sofi Jeannin.

== Personal life ==
Park married Hannah in April 2024. He describes himself as a keen gardener.
