= BBC Singers =

British professional chamber choir

- Choir
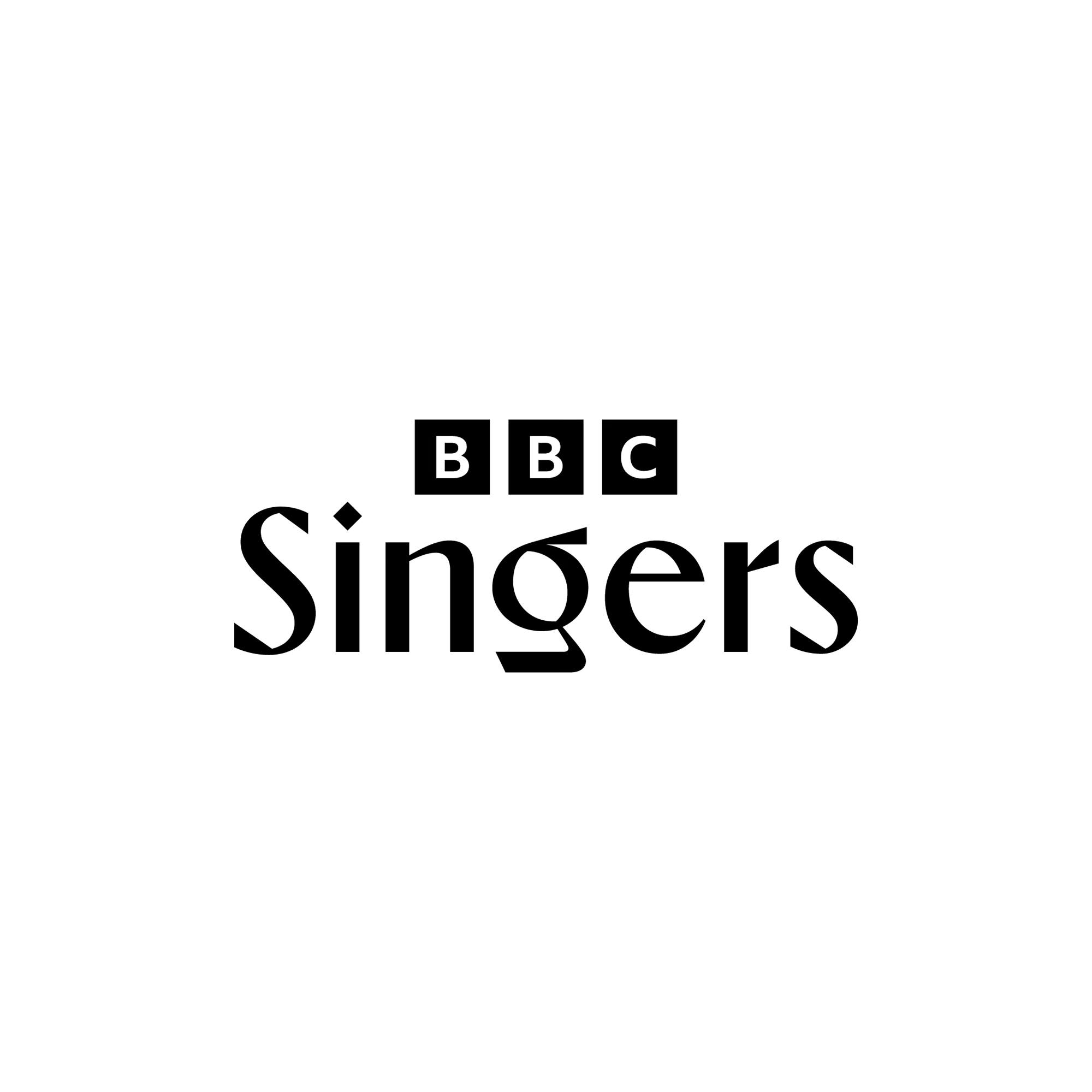
- BBC Singers logo (2009)
- Former name: The Wireless Chorus (1924); The Wireless Singers (1927); BBC Chorus (1961)
- Origin: London, United Kingdom
- Founded: 1924 (102 years ago)
- Genre: Classical
- Chief conductor: Sofi Jeannin
- Manager: Jonathan Manners
- Headquarters: Maida Vale Studios
- Concert hall: Maida Vale Studios
- Affiliation: BBC Proms; BBC Radio 3
- Associated groups: BBC Performing Groups
- Website: www.bbc.co.uk/singers/

The BBC Singers is a professional British chamber choir, employed by the BBC. Its origins can be traced to 1924. One of the six BBC Performing Groups, the BBC Singers are based at the BBC Maida Vale Studios in London. The only full-time professional British choir, the BBC Singers feature in live concerts, radio transmissions, recordings and education workshops. The choir often performs alongside other BBC Performing Groups, such as the BBC Symphony Orchestra, and is a regular guest at the BBC Proms. Broadcasts are made from locations around the country: London venues have included St Giles-without-Cripplegate, St John's, Smith Square and St Paul's Church, Knightsbridge.

The BBC Singers perform with leading international orchestras and conductors. The choir has appeared by invitation at national events such as the funeral of Diana, Princess of Wales in Westminster Abbey. Former members of the group include Sir Peter Pears, Sarah Connolly, Judith Bingham and Harry Christophers.

== History ==
In 1924, the BBC engaged Stanford Robinson as Chorus Master. He formed a choir for a performance of Rutland Boughton's Immortal Hour. This choir, known as 'The Wireless Chorus', was thereafter established as a full-time professional choir. In 1927, the BBC created an octet named 'The Wireless Singers', drawn from members of the Wireless Chorus, for performances where fewer singers were required. Guest conductors of both groups during these early years included Sir Edward Elgar, Igor Stravinsky, Arnold Schoenberg and John Barbirolli.

In 1931, the Wireless Chorus was invited to perform at the Festival of the International Society for Contemporary Music, the first time this event had been held in Britain.

On appointment of Leslie Woodgate as general chorus master in 1934, the group was renamed the BBC Singers, and divided into two octets, known as Singers A and Singers B, one specialising in less standard repertoire including Renaissance polyphony and madrigals, the other in light music and revue numbers. Singers A were typically paid £1 per week more than Singers B. In 1939, Woodgate described the operation and function of the various BBC choirs, including the professional choir, in an interview with The Musical Times.

During the Second World War, the choir was forced to relocate several times from its base in Maida Vale, briefly taking up residence in Bristol, Bangor and Bedford. In 1945, the choir gave the premiere of Francis Poulenc's wartime cantata Figure humaine from the Concert Hall of Broadcasting House. After the war, from the late 1940s onwards, the BBC Singers began to tour across Europe, under the direction of conductors such as Herbert von Karajan, Wilhelm Furtwängler and Bruno Walter. In England, the choir it worked with George Enescu, Sir Thomas Beecham, Otto Klemperer and Igor Stravinsky. From 1946, they became a regular feature of the BBC's new radio arts network, the Third Programme.

During the middle years of the twentieth century, the choir premiered major works by Darius Milhaud, Frank Martin, Paul Hindemith, Gerald Finzi, Sir Michael Tippett, Pierre Boulez, Sir Arthur Bliss and Karol Szymanowski. Pierre Boulez began a lifelong association with the choir in 1964.

Woodgate died in 1961. That same year, Peter Gellhorn took over the choir. He re-organised the professional contingent, scrapping the A–B division in favour of a single force of 28 voices, which was renamed the BBC Chorus. Following the appointment of John Poole as chorus master in 1972, the choir reverted to its previous name, the BBC Singers.

The choir continued to broadcast regularly on BBC Radio 3 and Radio 4, but its long-established participation in The Daily Service had been curtailed to one appearance per week by the early 1990s, after the Rev. David Winter (head of BBC religious broadcasting from 1982 to 1989) judged that its sound was "too clinical" for worship. The appointment of Bo Holten as Guest Conductor in 1991 introduced a new focus and approach to early music. The BBC Singers now work regularly with early music specialists, including Peter Phillips (Tallis Scholars) and Robert Hollingworth (I Fagiolini).

Stephen Cleobury, chief conductor of the choir from 1995 to 2007, held the title of conductor laureate with the choir until his death in 2019. Bob Chilcott is the current principal guest conductor of the choir. David Hill was the most recent conductor from 2007 to 2017. Sofi Jeannin was a guest-conductor of the choir in January 2017. In May 2017, the BBC announced her appointment as the choir's next chief conductor, the first woman to hold the post, with effect from July 2018. In April 2022, the BBC announced the extension of Jeannin's contract as chief conductor of the BBC Singers through 2026, along with the appointments of Owain Park as principal guest conductor, Roderick Williams as composer-in-association, and Anna Lapwood and Abel Selaocoe each as an artist-in-association.

On 7 March 2023, the BBC announced its decision to close the choir later in the year as part of its "new strategy" for classical music. Following public reactions in protest at this announcement, the BBC reversed this decision on 24 March. In February 2024, the BBC announced a new partnership between the BBC Singers and the Voces8 Foundation for future sustainability of the BBC Singers.

In July 2024, the BBC announced the appointment of Jonathan Manners as director of the BBC Singers. In July 2025, the BBC announced simultaneously the scheduled conclusion of Jeannin's tenure as chief conductor of the ensemble at the close of the 2025-2026 season, and the appointment of Park as the ensemble's next chief conductor, effective with the 2026-2027 season.

== Choir directors and chief conductors ==
- Stanford Robinson (1924–1932)
- Leslie Woodgate (1934–1961)
- Peter Gellhorn (1961–1972)
- John Poole (1972–1989)
- Simon Joly (1989–1995)
- Stephen Cleobury (1995–2007)
- David Hill (2007–2017)
- Sofi Jeannin (2018–present)

== Commissioned works ==
Over its history, the BBC Singers has performed and commissioned more than a hundred new works. These include Gustav Holst's The Morning of the Year (1927), Benjamin Britten's A Boy was Born (1934), and works by Michael Berkeley, Sir Richard Rodney Bennett, John Casken, Sir Peter Maxwell Davies, Thea Musgrave, Edmund Rubbra, Robert Saxton, Sir John Tavener, Sir Michael Tippett and Iannis Xenakis.

Select list of commissioned works:

- Judith Bingham – A Winter Walk at Noon – First broadcast 2 March 1986
- Benjamin Britten – A Shepherd's Carol & Chorale: Our Father Whose Creative Will – First broadcast 24 December 1944
- Sir Peter Maxwell Davies – Apple-Basket: Apple-Blossom – First broadcast 23 December 1990
- James Dillon – Viriditas – First broadcast 24 April 1994
- Nicola LeFanu – The Story of Mary O'Neill – First broadcast 4 January 1989
- Thea Musgrave – For the Time Being: Advent – First broadcast 18 July 1987
- Edmund Rubbra – Veni, Creator Spiritus – First broadcast 5 August 1966
- Sir Michael Tippett – The Weeping Babe – First broadcast 24 December 1944
- Iannis Xenakis – Sea Nymphs – First broadcast 16 September 1994

In 2002, Edward Cowie became the BBC Singers' first Associate Composer, with the functions of composing new works each year for performance by the choir, and participating in workshops with young composers from schools, universities and music colleges. Judith Bingham was the next to fill this position, in 2004. Gabriel Jackson took the post in 2010. Subsequent composers-in-association with the BBC Singers have included Judith Weir and Roderick Williams.

== Select discography ==
- Judith Bingham – Remoter Worlds – David Hill (conductor) 2008, Catalogue No. Signum Classics SIGCD144
- Judith Weir – The Welcome Arrival of Rain – BBC Symphony Orchestra, Martyn Brabbins (conductor) 2008, Catalogue No. NMC D137
- Leoš Janáček – The Excursions of Mr Broucek – BBC Symphony Orchestra, Jirí Belohlávek (conductor) 2008
- Elizabeth Maconchy – Music for voices – Odaline de la Martinez (conductor) 2007, Catalogue No. LNT127
- Sergei Rachmaninoff – Francesca di Rimini – BBC Philharmonic, Gianandrea Noseda (conductor) 2007, Catalogue No. Chandos 10442
- Bob Chilcott – Man I Sing – Bob Chilcott, (conductor) 2007, Catalogue No. Signum Classics SIGCD100
- Brian Ferneyhough – Choral works – Lontano, Odaline de la Martinez (conductor) 2007, Catalogue No. Metier msv28501
- Michael Tippett – Choral Images – Stephen Cleobury (conductor) 2007 Catalogue No. Signum Classics SIGCD092
- Paul Dukas – Ariane et Barbe-bleue – BBC Symphony Orchestra, Leon Botstein (conductor) 2007, Catalogue No. TELARC 80680
- Benjamin Britten – Death in Venice – City of London Sinfonia, Richard Hickox (conductor) 2005, Chandos 10280(2)
- One Star, At Last – A selection of carols of our time – Stephen Cleobury (conductor) 2005, Catalogue No. Signum Classics SIGCD067
- Alexander Levine – Kolokolà – James Morgan (conductor) 2005, Catalogue No. Albany TROY736

== See also ==
- BBC Orchestras and Singers

== Sources ==
- Sean Street, Historical Dictionary of British Radio, pp. 54–55
