= BBC Orchestras and Singers =

Music ensembles, maintained by the BBC

BBC Orchestras and Singers refers collectively to a number of orchestras, choirs and other musical ensembles, maintained by the BBC.

== Current operation ==
All of the BBC’s Orchestras and Singers record performances primarily for BBC Radio 3, with the exception of the BBC Concert Orchestra which also has a dual role shared with BBC Radio 2. Recordings are either taken from one of around 400 live concerts each year with an audience, or from studio sessions.

Unusually for BBC departments, all of the ensembles also take part in a number of non-broadcast activities, including festival appearances and international touring, and in education work within their regional communities.

The ensembles managed in England report to the Controller of Radio 3 with the BBC National Orchestra of Wales and BBC Scottish Symphony Orchestra reporting to BBC Cymru Wales and BBC Scotland respectively.

In 2012, John Myerscough was commissioned to report on potential financial savings of the BBC’s Orchestras and Singers. He recommended no more than 10% budget cuts, highlighting the ensembles' successful range of work.

The two choruses, BBC Symphony Chorus and BBC National Chorus of Wales, are volunteer choristers and are not paid a salary. The BBC Singers are the UK’s only full-time professional chamber choir, and along with the five orchestras, they are full-time salaried musicians whose pay is negotiated with the Musicians' Union (United Kingdom).

In March 2021, it was announced that the BBC Concert Orchestra would relocate to a new city "outside of the M25", as part of wider BBC announcements redistributing hundreds of jobs outside of London.

In March 2023, the BBC announced plans to reduce salaried orchestral posts across the BBC Symphony, Concert and Philharmonic orchestras by around 20% and close the BBC Singers. After protests by the Musicians Union and the broader musical community, the BBC said in April that it would seek alternative ways of finding financial savings that would seek to sustain the future of BBC performing groups.

== Current list of ensembles ==
- Logos of the BBC Orchestras and Choirs
  BBC Big Band (not BBC-funded)
- BBC Concert Orchestra
- BBC National Chorus of Wales
- BBC National Orchestra of Wales
- BBC Philharmonic
- BBC Scottish Symphony Orchestra
- BBC Singers
- BBC Symphony Chorus
- BBC Symphony Orchestra

== Disbanded BBC ensembles ==
- BBC Dance Orchestra (1928–1952, formed as the London Radio Dance Band in 1926, became the BBC Showband in 1952 and the BBC Big Band in 1964)
- BBC Empire Orchestra (1934–1939, part of BBC Empire Service, now the BBC World Service; orchestra conducted by Eric Fogg)
- BBC Midland Orchestra (1934–1941, became the BBC Midland Light Orchestra, 1941–1973 and the BBC Midland Radio Orchestra, 1973–1980).
- BBC Military Band (originally the BBC Wireless Military Band, 1927-43. Gerrard Williams was staff arranger and it was conducted by Bertram Walton O'Donnell from 1927 to 1937, when his brother Major P.S.G. O'Donnell took over.
- BBC Northern Dance Orchestra (1956–1985, the successor to the BBC Northern Variety Orchestra, founded 1951)
- BBC Northern Ireland Orchestra (absorbed by the Ulster Orchestra)
- BBC Northern Orchestra (1934–1982, formed out of the 2ZY Orchestra (1922), Northern Wireless Orchestra (1926) and Northern Studio Orchestra (1930), renamed the BBC Northern Symphony Orchestra in 1967, became the BBC Philharmonic Orchestra in 1982
- BBC Northern Singers (1954–1992, became The Britten Singers)
- BBC Opera Orchestra (formed 1949, reformed as the BBC Concert Orchestra, 1952)
- BBC Radio Orchestra (1964–1991, formed from the amalgamation of the BBC Revue Orchestra and the BBC Variety Orchestra)
- BBC Revue Orchestra (1939–1964)
- BBC Salon Orchestra (1939–1942), based initially at Evesham, Worcestershire and then in Bristol, conducted by Leslie Bridgewater, led by Jean Pougnet and featuring 20 players including Léon Goossens, Rae Jenkins, Reginald Kell, Anthony Pini, Frederick Riddle and David Wise. It played light music in mostly studio broadcasts, aimed at boosting wartime morale.
- BBC Scottish Variety Orchestra (from 1967 the BBC Scottish Radio Orchestra (1940–1981))
- BBC Television Orchestra (1936–1939, reformed as the BBC Revue Orchestra)
- BBC Theatre Orchestra (formed 1931, became the BBC Opera Orchestra in 1949)
- BBC Variety Orchestra (1934–1964)
- BBC West of England Light orchestra (1950–1960)
- BBC West of England Players (1960–1965)
- The New BBC Orchestra (founded 1966, renamed the BBC Training Orchestra in 1968, and then the Academy of the BBC in 1974 - disbanded 1977)
- BBC Chorus, founded 1930s, abolished in 1961
