= Figure humaine =

Cantata by Francis Poulenc

- Cantata by Francis Poulenc
- Liberty Leading the People by Eugène Delacroix (1830) (Louvre, Paris) – Liberté is the title of the song concluding the cantata, a hymn to "Liberty", victorious over tyranny.
- English: Human Figure
- Catalogue: FP 120
- Text: Poems by Paul Éluard from Poésie et Vérité
- Language: French
- Composed: 1943
- Performed: 25 March 1945: London
- Movements: 8
- Scoring: 12 vocal parts a cappella

Figure humaine (Human Figure), FP 120, by Francis Poulenc is a cantata for double mixed choir of 12 voices composed in 1943 on texts by Paul Éluard including "'Liberté". Written during the Nazi occupation of France, it was premiered in London in English by the BBC in 1945. It was first performed in French in 1946 in Brussels, then in Paris on 22 May 1947. The work was published by Éditions Salabert. Cherished as the summit of the composer's work and a masterpiece by musical critics, the cantata is a hymn to Liberté, victorious over tyranny.

== Genesis ==
=== Meeting with Paul Éluard ===
The meeting of Francis Poulenc and Paul Éluard dates from 1916 or 1917 (Note: (p. 122)) during the First World War, at the Parisian bookstore of his friend Adrienne Monnier. When the composer Georges Auric met the writer around 1919, he suggested to Poulenc to set texts by Éluard to music. (Note: (p. 123)) Éluard was the only surrealist writer who tolerated music, and the musicologist Peter Jost listed the works of Georges Auric and Francis Poulenc on his texts: six for Auric and 34 for Poulenc, augmented by three choral works including Figure humaine. (Note: (p. 121))

The poems of the cantata are among the most famous by Éluard. They express the "suffering of the people of France" reduced to silence and the hope of the "final triumph of freedom over tyranny". (Note: (p. 183))

=== Composition of the cantata ===
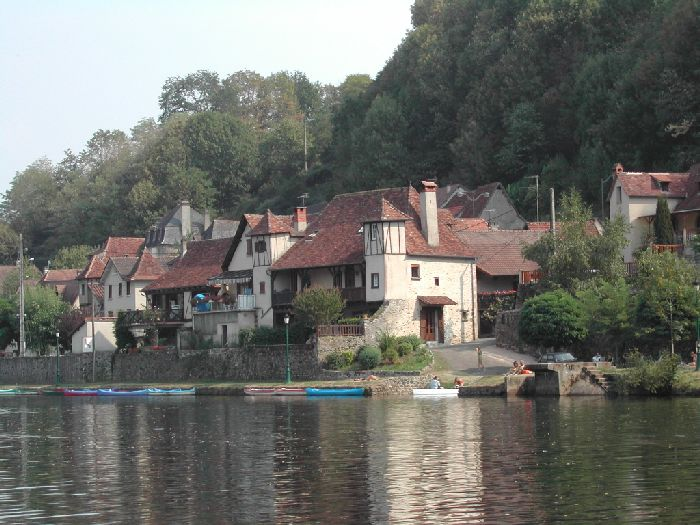
Beaulieu-sur-Dordogne where the cantata was written

The Second World War was a pivotal period in the life of the composer. In the Entretiens avec Claude Rostand, he specifies "Some privileged persons, of whom I was one, had the comfort of receiving morning letters, marvellous typed poems, below whose names we guessed the signature of Paul Éluard. This is how I received most of the poems Poésie et Vérité 42. (Note: (p. 182)) Poulenc rented a small two-room apartment in Beaulieu-sur-Dordogne and began composing a violin concerto at the request of Ginette Neveu but quickly abandoned this work.

A hypothesis advanced by Renaud Machart mentions the genesis of this cantata. He suggests that a play on Éluard's poem Liberté poem would have been commissioned in March 1943 by Henri Screpel, the then director of "Les Discophiles Français", in parallel with another commission for a choral work by Louis de Vocht and the choir of Sainte-Cécile of Antwerp. (Note: (p. 139))

The composition of the cantata ended at the end of the summer of 1943. Poulenc's correspondence with his intimate friend Geneviève Sienkiewicz evokes the process of writing Figure humaine. Retired to Beaulieu, he wrote to his friend in August 1943: "I am working on a cantata a capella on poems by Éluard. (...) I have already done the 3/4 of this cycle and I am not dissatisfied with it". (Note: Letter dated August 1943, Beaulieu, (p. 252)) He evokes the sad apartment where he resides in Beaulieu with a view of the bell tower and states: "It was by contemplating it, solid and so French, that I conceived the music of Liberté (Note: Letter dated August 1945, (p. 254)) which closes the cantata. The publisher Paul Rouart agreed to publish the work despite the Occupation and sent it to London, which allowed it to be created by the BBC in 1945. The training required complicated its execution, but in his Entretiens avec Claude Rostand Poulenc declares his wish that this "act of faith may be expressed without the aid of the instrument, through the mere voice of the human voice". (Note: (p. 186))

=== Premiere ===
Figure humaine was premiered in English by the BBC Chorus under their director Leslie Woodgate on Palm Sunday, 25 March 1945, (Note: The date of 25 March 1945 is advanced by Myriam Chimenes in the edition of a part of the unpublished correspondence of Poulenc with Geneviève Sienkiewicz) then in Brussels (Belgium) in French on 2 December 1946 by the Chœurs de la radiodiffusion flamande under the direction of Paul Collaer. The French premiere took place at the Concerts de la Pléiade in Paris on 22 May 1947.

=== Reception and legacy ===
According to biographer Henri Hell, it is in the choral domain that Francis Poulenc wrote his most accomplished works, (Note: Sept Chansons pour chœur a capella, the Messe en sol majeur, Chanson à boire, Quatre motets pour un temps de pénitence, Stabat Mater, Gloria, Sept répons des ténèbres) leaning more to a cappella works than to accompanied ones (Note: (p. 115)) and describes Figure humaine as one of the most striking works of contemporary choral music, (Note: (p. 181)) "wonderfully polyphonic, rich and complex sound texture". However, the composition of the double chorus makes its execution difficult, and the work was only resumed on 27 May 1959 at salle Gaveau in Paris for the composer's 60th anniversary. The cantata is considered by some to be the absolute masterpiece of the composer. (Note: (p. 138)) In a letter dated October 28, 1943 addressed to his friend the Princess of Polignac, Poulenc confides "I believe that this is what I did best. It is in any case a major work for me if it is not for French music". (Note: (p. 140))

== Structure and analysis ==
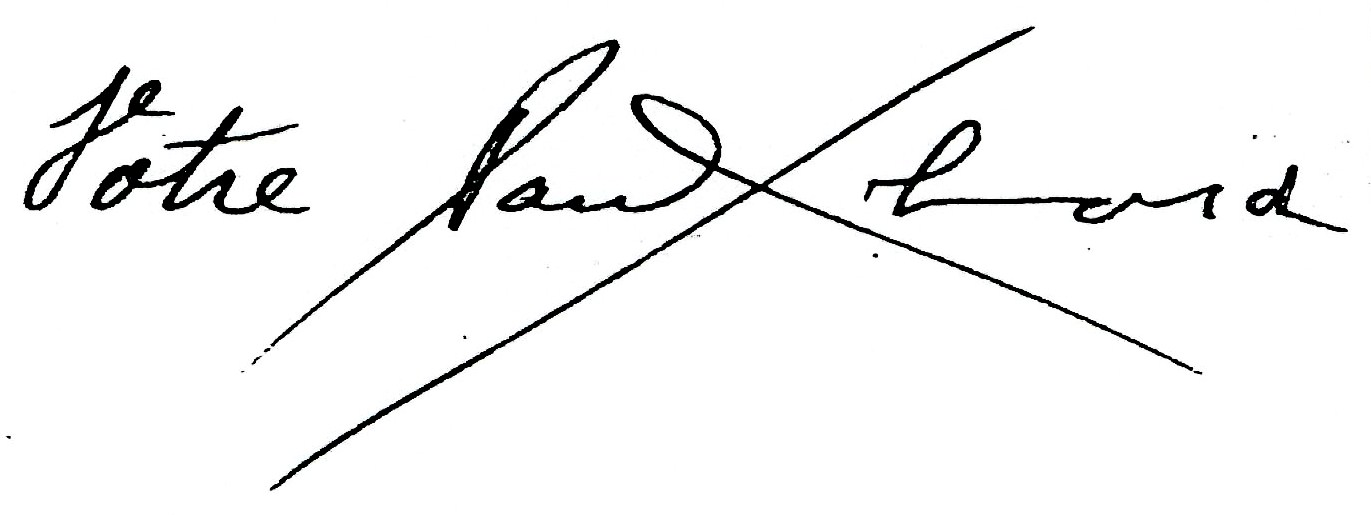
Signature of Paul Éluard, author of Liberté, a poem from Poésie et vérité

The cantata is written for a double mixed choir and twelve real parts and is divided into eight movements:

1. De tous les printemps du monde
2. En chantant, les servantes s'élancent
3. Aussi bas que le silence
4. Toi ma patiente
5. Riant du ciel et des planètes
6. Le jour m'étonne et la nuit me fait peur
7. La menace sous le ciel rouge
8. Liberté

=== De tous les printemps du monde ===
This first song is of a duration of 2 minutes 40. It develops a final which possesses reminiscences of Sécheresses. (Note: (p. 110))

=== En chantant, les servantes s'élancent ===
This second song has an execution time of about 2 minutes. Of a quasi-instrumental writing, notably in the repetition of the sung notes "la, la, la", it is written in the manner of a "Scherzo" and presents a rhythm more pronounced than the other songs, more melodic and harmonic.

=== Aussi bas que le silence ===
This third song has a duration of 1 minute 40 seconds.

=== Toi ma patiente ===
This fourth song has a duration of 2 minutes. If the cantata conjugates the emotions, regret, pain, violence, sadness, it is tenderness that emerges from Toi ma patiente for the first solo chorus. There is a harmonious resemblance of this song with Une barque sur l'océan from the Miroirs by Maurice Ravel.

=== Riant du ciel et des planètes ===
The fifth song has a run time of one minute.

=== Le jour m'étonne et la nuit me fait peur ===
This sixth song has a duration of 2 minutes. The tenderness that emanates from the fourth song Toi ma patiente is revealed again in this episode. The second solo choir intones a "melody of a sad and heart-rending sweetness, (Note: (p. 184)) accompanied by a murmur by the other voices of the choir. Considered by Renaud Machart as the most moving passage in the cantata, this song is a melody shedding "on a harmony of splendid simplicity".

=== La menace sous le ciel rouge ===
This seventh song is of a duration of 3 minutes. "Carried away and rough", this episode starts with a fugue begun by the altos choir of the first chorus, then resumed together by the two choirs until the words La pourriture avait du cœur. The movement gives way to the initial tempo where the two choirs sing together, first pianissimo, then crescendo until the end of a "magnificent magnitude". A long silence introduces the eighth and last part of the cantata, Liberté.

=== Liberté ===
This eighth and last song has an execution time of about 4 minutes. A true hymn to "freedom," or according to Henri Hell of the "litanies of Liberty", this song based on the poem by Éluard which includes 21 stanzas of four verses built on the model of the first:

- Sur mes cahiers d'écolier
- Sur mon pupitre et les arbres
- Sur le sable sur la neige
- J'écris ton nom

It is only after the last stanza that the word Liberté breaks out, as if to emphasize it better. Emotions appear in each stropes, softness, tenderness, sadness, strength and violence, moving from "one to the other with an invisible suppleness". (Note: (p. 185)) The final bars are notoriously challenging, with the highest soprano in each chorus required to hit an E6 at the work's climactic conclusion.

== Selected discography ==
- Swedish Radio Choir, Eric Ericson, Electrola/His Master's Voice (1971) – first recording
- The Sixteen, Harry Christophers, Virgin Classics (1993)
- Norddeutscher Figuralchor, Jörg Straube, Dabringhaus & Grimm (2009)
- Tenebrae, Nigel Short, Signum Classics (2010)

== Sources ==
- Henri Hell. Francis Poulenc (in French).
- Machart, Renaud. Poulenc (in French).
- Mas (dir), Josiane. Centenaire Georges Auric – Francis Poulenc (in French).
- Poulenc, Francis. Journal de mes mélodies (in French).

== Bibliography ==
- Machart, Renaud (1995). Poulenc (in French). Paris: Éditions du Seuil. p. 252. ISBN 2-02-013695-3.
- Poulenc, Francis (1993). Journal de mes mélodies (in French). Paris: Cicéro Éditeurs, Salabert. p. 159. ISBN 2-908369-10-9.
- Hell, Henri (1978). Francis Poulenc (in French). Paris: Fayard. p. 388. ISBN 2-213-00670-9.
- Mas (dir), Josiane (2001). Centenaire Georges Auric – Francis Poulenc (in French). Centre d'études du XX – Université de Montpellier III. p. 338. ISBN 2-84269-445-7.
