= Liberté (poem) =

1942 poem written by Paul Éluard

- by Paul Éluard
- Written: 5 March 1942
- First published in: Poésie et vérité
- Country: France
- Language: French
- Publication date: 3 April 1942
- Lines: 84

"Liberté" (Liberty) is a 1942 poem by the French poet Paul Éluard. It is an ode to liberty written during the German occupation of France.

== Description ==
The poem is structured in twenty-one quatrains, which follow the same pattern. Éluard names many places, real or imaginary, on which he would write the word liberté. The first three lines of each begin with Sur (On) followed by the naming of a place, and the last line is twenty times, like a refrain, J'écris ton nom (I write your name). The 21st stanza reveals that name, saying Pour te nommer Liberté. (To name you Liberty). The first stanza reads:

French

Sur mes cahiers d’écolier
Sur mon pupitre et les arbres
Sur le sable sur la neige
J’écris ton nom.

English

On my notebooks
On my desk and the trees
On the sand on the snow
I write your name.

== Background ==
The original title of the poem was Une seule pensée (A single thought). Éluard comments:

Je pensais révéler pour conclure le nom de la femme que j’aimais, à qui ce poème était destiné. Mais je me suis vite aperçu que le seul mot que j’avais en tête était le mot Liberté. Ainsi, la femme que j’aimais incarnait un désir plus grand qu’elle. Je la confondais avec mon aspiration la plus sublime, et ce mot Liberté n’était lui-même dans tout mon poème que pour éterniser une très simple volonté, très quotidienne, très appliquée, celle de se libérer de l’Occupant. (I thought of revealing at the end the name of the woman I loved and for whom this poem was intended. But I quickly realized that the only word I had in mind was the word Liberté. Thus, the woman I loved embodied a desire greater than her. I confounded it with my most sublime aspiration, and this word Liberté was itself in my whole poem only to eternalize a very simple will, very daily, very apt, that of freeing oneself from the occupation.)

== Publication ==
The poem was published on 3 April 1942, without apparent censorship, in the clandestine book of poetry Poésie et vérité 1942 (Poetry and truth 1942). According to Max Pol Fouchet, he convinced Éluard to reprint the poem in June 1942 in the magazine Fontaine, titled Une seule pensée, to reach the southern Zone libre. The same year, it was printed in London in the official Gaullist magazine La France libre and thousands of copies were dropped by parachute by British aircraft of the Royal Air Force above occupied France maquis. In 1945, the poem was published by Éditions de Minuit in Éluard's poetry book Au rendez-vous allemand. The complex history of Éluard's collections is detailed by the editors of his complete works, Lucien Scheler and Marcelle Dumas, particularly in Vol. 1 of Bibliothèque de la Pléiade, 1975, p. 1606–1607.

== Legacy ==
Francis Poulenc composed in 1943 Figure humaine, FP 120, a cantata for double mixed choir of 12 voices on this and seven other poems by Éluard. Written during the German occupation of France, it could not be performed in France, but was premiered in a radio broadcast of the BBC in English on 25 March 1945.

Argentine singer Jairo composed and frequently performed a highly successful song version of the poem (1977 - while living in France) .

Canadian composer Jacques Hétu included a choral setting of the poem as the final movement of his Fifth Symphony (2010).

Liberal quotings from the poem created an underlying theme in the 2014 drama film Maps to the Stars.

The poem is spoken in full in the concluding sequences of the 2026 two film biopic De Gaulle directed by Antonin Baudry.

American singer Madeleine Peyroux included this text on the song Liberté, from her 2018 album, Anthem.
