= Amédée Gastoué =

French musicologist and composer (1873–1943)

- Born: Amédée Henri Gustave Noël Gastoué; 19 March 1873; Paris
- Died: 1 June 1943 (aged 70); Clamart
- Occupation: Musicologist

Amédée Henri Gustave Noël Gastoué (19 March 1873 – 1 June 1943) was a French musicologist and composer.

== Biography ==
A Kapellmeister at the Église Saint-Jean-Baptiste de Belleville, professor of gregorian chant at the Schola Cantorum of Paris, Gastoué was particularly interested in Byzantine music, that of the Middle Ages and Armenian musical art. He also taught choral chant and Medieval music at the Institut catholique de Paris, the Collège Stanislas and the Lycée Montaigne. He was president of the Société française de musicologie (1934–1936) and remains known for his studies and writings. He was raised to the dignity of Commander of the Pontifical Order of Pope Gregory I by Pope Pius X.

Gastoué is the great-great-grandfather of Emmanuel Trenque, himself an organist and choral conductor.

== Studies ==
List according to the « Principaux ouvrages du même auteur » of Graduel et l'antiphonaire romains, histoire et description (fac-similé)

- Le Graduel et l'antiphonaire romains, histoire et description, Jeanin frères, Lyon 1913, 302 p. (fac-similé).
- Histoire du chant liturgique à Paris I, Dès origines à la fin des temps carolingiens, Poussielgue, Paris, 86 p.
- Cours théorique et pratique de plain-chant romain grégorien, Bureau de l'édition de la Schola cantorum, Paris 1904, 222 p.
- Les Origines du chant romain, l'Antiphonaire grégorien, Alphonse Picard & fils, Paris 1907
- Introduction à la Paléographie musicale byzantine; Catalogue des manuscrits de musique byzantine de la Bibliothèque nationale de Paris et des Bibliothèques publiques de France, Société internationale de musique et Geuthner, Paris 1907
- Nouvelle méthode pratique de chant grégorien, seule entièrement conforme à l'Édition vaticane, Lecoffre, Paris 1909.
- Traité d'harmonisation du chant grégorien, Janin frères, Lyon 1910, 130 p.
- L'Art grégorien, collection Maîtres de la musique, Alcan, Paris, 208 p.
- Musique et Apologétique : la Musique d'Église, Études historiques, esthétiques et pratiques, Janin frères, Lyon 1911, 284 p.

== Musical work ==
- Jeanne d'Arc, partition (récits, soli et chœurs, réduction de l'accompagnement au piano), légende en trois parties (Paris, Bonne Presse).
- Viviane, préludes et musique de scène (for the three-act drama by Georges Gourdon)
- Cantiques populaires, three series (Paris, Schola).
- Credo à quatre voix mixtes a cappella pour alterner avec le chant liturgique (same publisher)
- Petit Salut à deux voix égales et orgue, collection des Sclecla opéra.
- Messes et motets à plusieurs voix.
