= Toward the Unknown Region =

1907 choral composition by Ralph Vaughan Williams

Ralph Vaughan Williams in 1913

Toward the Unknown Region was the first major choral piece by the composer Ralph Vaughan Williams, a setting of a poem by Walt Whitman. Described by Vaughan Williams as a "Song for chorus and orchestra", it was premiered at the Leeds Festival in October 1907.

== Background ==
Vaughan Williams loved the poetry of Walt Whitman throughout his adult life. He had been introduced to Whitman's work by Bertrand Russell while they were undergraduates at Cambridge. The musicologist Elliott Schwartz has commented that Vaughan Williams was particularly attracted to Whitman by traits that are paralleled in his music: "the concern for the development of a national art independent of foreign influences and the recurring theme of mysticism and exploration". The composer's first settings of words by Whitman were two vocal duets with violin obbligato: "The Last Invocation" and "The Birds’ Love-Song". He later rejected these songs, calling one "perfectly awful" and the other "an unconscious crib". His first canonical setting of Whitman was composed in late 1904 or early 1905, using the words of "Darest thou now, O soul" from the "Whispers of Heavenly Death" section of Leaves of Grass:

Darest thou now O soul,
Walk out with me toward the unknown region,
Where neither ground is for the feet nor any path to follow?

No map there, nor guide,
Nor voice sounding, nor touch of human hand,
Nor face with blooming flesh, nor lips, nor eyes, are in that land.

I know it not O soul,
Nor dost thou, all is a blank before us,
All waits undream'd of in that region, that inaccessible land.

Till when the ties loosen,
All but the ties eternal, Time and Space,
Nor darkness, gravitation, sense, nor any bounds bounding us.

Then we burst forth, we float,
In Time and Space O soul, prepared for them,
Equal, equipt at last, (O joyl O fruit of all!) them to fulfil O soul.

The piece is dedicated to the composer's sister-in-law Florence Maitland in memory of her husband, F. W. Maitland, Downing Professor of the Laws of England at Cambridge, whose recent death had grieved Vaughan Williams.

== Premiere and reception ==
The composer conducted the first performance, which was given at the Leeds Festival on 10 October 1907, in a concert otherwise conducted by his former professor at the Royal College of Music, Sir Charles Stanford. The London premiere of the piece was conducted by Stanford two months later.

The music critic of The Times, J. A. Fuller Maitland, wrote:

The composition, is easily ahead of anything the young composer has yet given us, and here we see the perfect maturity of his genius, the art that conceals art most effectually, and a nobility and earnestness of invention which mark the composer as the foremost of the younger generation. … In the art of piling climax upon climax, and of carrying our feelings irresistibly forward from beginning to end, the composer is already a master, and the enthusiasm with which he was greeted at the close (he was called three or four times) was felt by every one to be fully deserved.

Later analysts note the influence of older composers: Stanford, Elgar and particularly Hubert Parry, another of Vaughan Williams's former professors, whose Blest Pair of Sirens (1887) is, according to both Michael Kennedy (1980) and Christopher Palmer (1993), a model in form and general outline for Toward the Unknown Region.

== Structure ==
The work is scored for 3 flutes, 2 oboes, cor anglais, 2 clarinets in B♭, bass clarinet in B♭, 2 bassoons, 4 horns in F, 3 trumpets in F, 3 trombones, tuba, timpani, 2 harps, organ and strings. The chorus is in the traditional four vocal parts.

The duration is typically between 11 and 13 minutes.

== Recordings ==
Conductor	Orchestra	Chorus	Date
Sir Malcolm Sargent	London Symphony Orchestra	BBC Chorus (Note: Several published discographies credit the London Symphony Chorus for this recording, but that ensemble was not founded until the 1960s. The LSO's own discography confirms that the BBC Chorus sang on this recording.)	1957
Sir Adrian Boult	London Philharmonic Orchestra	London Philharmonic Choir	1973
Norman Del Mar	City of Birmingham Symphony Orchestra	City of Birmingham Symphony Chorus	1980
Bryden Thomson	London Symphony Orchestra	London Symphony Chorus	1989
David Hill	Bournemouth Symphony Orchestra	Waynflete Singers; Winchester Cathedral Choir	1991
Matthew Best	Corydon Orchestra	Corydon Singers	1993
David Lloyd-Jones	Royal Liverpool Philharmonic Orchestra	Royal Liverpool Philharmonic Choir	2005
Graham Taylor	Scottish Opera Orchestra,	City of Glasgow Chorus	2005

Source: WorldCat and Naxos Music Library

== Notes, references and sources ==
=== Sources ===
- Kennedy, Michael (1980). The Works of Ralph Vaughan Williams (second ed.). London and New York: Oxford University Press. ISBN 978-0-19-315453-7.
- Palmer, Christopher (1993). Ralph Vaughan Williams. London: Hyperion. OCLC 1425975179.
- Schwartz, Elliott (1964). The Symphonies of Ralph Vaughan Williams. Amherst: University of Massachusetts Press. LCCN 64024402.
- Vaughan Williams, Ralph (1924). Toward the Unknown Region. London: Stainer and Bell. OCLC 25721304.
