= The Gesualdo Six =

English male vocal sextet

- Vocal ensemble
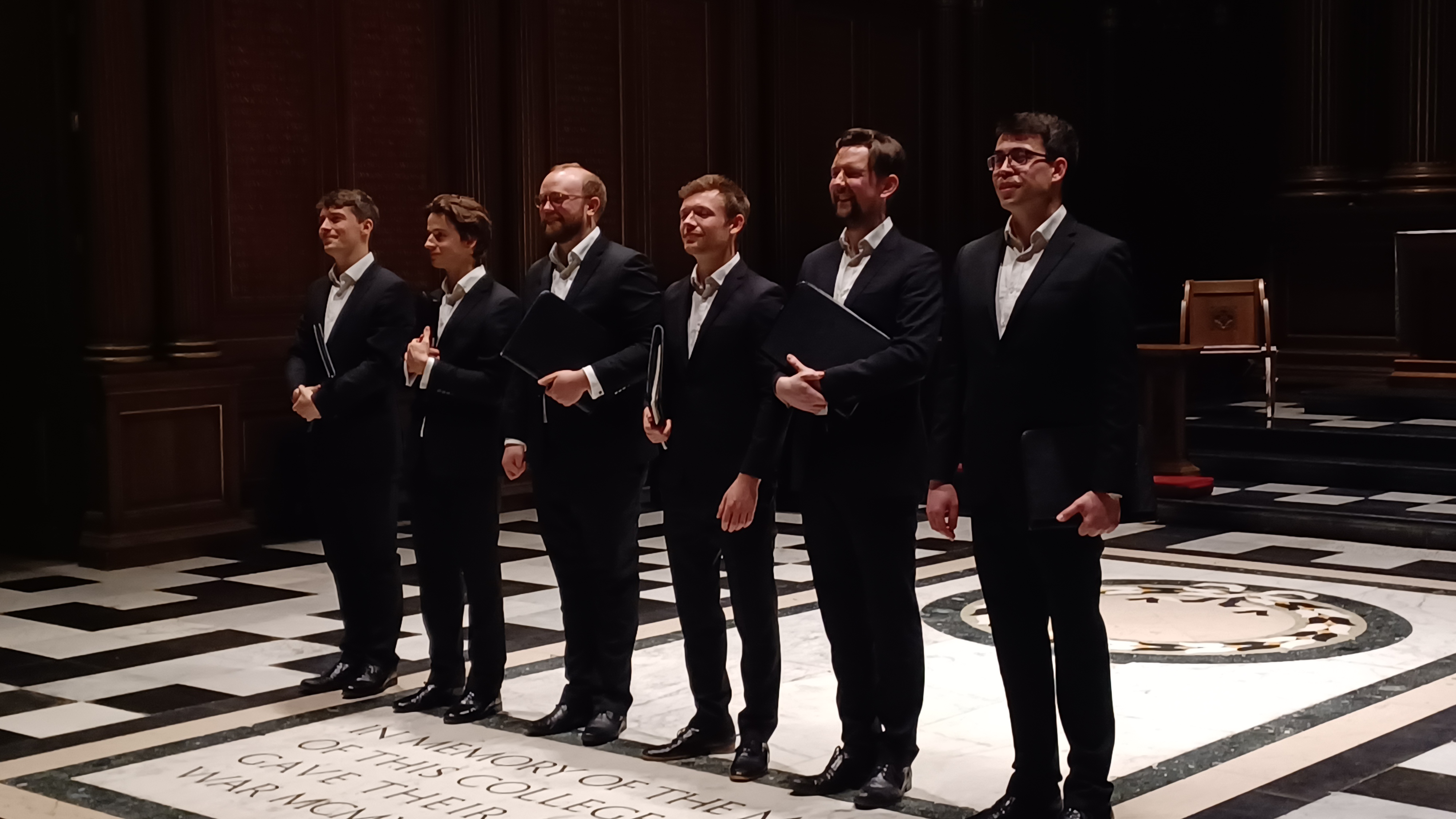
- The Gesualdo Six at Trinity College Chapel in 2024
- Origin: Cambridge, UK
- Founded: 2014
- Genre: Medieval, Renaissance and Contemporary choral music
- Director: Owain Park
- Label: Hyperion
- Website: thegesualdosix.co.uk

The Gesualdo Six is a British vocal consort directed by Owain Park. The group performs a broad-ranging repertoire, from the music of the medieval period through to contemporary compositions of the present day.

The Gesualdo Six was founded in Cambridge in 2014 for a performance of the Tenebrae Responsories for Maundy Thursday by Carlo Gesualdo in the chapel of Trinity College.

The ensemble was St John's Smith Square Young Artists for the 2015-16 season and, in partnership with St John's Smith Square and the Music Sales Group, curated a composition competition in 2016, which attracted more than 170 entries from across the globe. A second composition competition in 2018 attracted more than 300 entries.

== Performances and tours ==
The Gesualdo Six performs throughout the UK and internationally. Performances have included concerts at Christ Church Cathedral, Oxford, the Snape Maltings Concert Hall, St Martin-in-the-Fields in London, the York Early Music Festival, the Lammermuir Festival and the Little Missenden Festival.

The group has collaborated with the string ensemble Fretwork on an immersive theatrical concert titled Secret Byrd, which presents the life and work of the Elizabethan composer William Byrd.

In addition to regular concerts throughout the UK and Europe, the ensemble undertakes several intercontinental tours a year; these have included several tours of the United States, Canada, Australia, and New Zealand.

== Recordings ==
In 2018 the Gesualdo Six released their debut album, English Motets, on the Hyperion label. It features works from the English Renaissance by composers including Dunstaple, Cornysh, Byrd, Tallis, Tomkins, Sheppard, and Morley. It was selected for the quarterly Bestenliste by the German Record Critics' Awards in August 2018.

A second CD, Christmas, was released in November 2019, again on the Hyperion label. It was selected as The Times 'Album of the Week' for 15 December 2019. Their third album, Fading, was released in March 2020 and won Limelight magazine's "Vocal & Choral Recording of the Year".

Subsequent recordings on the Hyperion label include Josquin's Legacy (2021), Tenebrae Responsories for Maundy Thursday (2022), Lux aeterna (2022), Byrd: Mass for five voices & other works (2023), and Morning Star (2023).

== Personnel ==
=== Members ===
Current members

- Guy James – Countertenor (2014–present)
- Alasdair Austin – Countertenor (2023–present)
- Joseph Wicks – Tenor (2014–present)
- Josh Cooter – Tenor (2016–present)
- Simon Grant – Baritone (2025–present)
- Owain Park – Bass and Artistic Director (2014–present)

Former members

- Patrick Dunachie – Countertenor (2014–2016)
- Alexander Chance – Countertenor (2016–2019)
- Andrew Leslie Cooper – Countertenor (2019–2021)
- Hiroshi Amako – Tenor (2014–2016)
- Michael Craddock – Baritone (2014–2025)
- Jonathan Pacey – Bass (2014–2015)
- Sam Mitchell – Bass-Baritone (2016–2023)

== Discography ==
- Byrd: Mass for five voices & other works (2023), Hyperion CDA68416
- Christmas (2019), Hyperion CDA68299
- English Motets (2018), Hyperion CDA68256
- Fading (2020), Hyperion CDA68285
- Tenebrae Responsories for Maundy Thursday (2022), Hyperion CDA68348
- Josquin's legacy (2021), Hyperion CDA68379
- Lux aeterna (2022), Hyperion CDA68388
- Morning star (2023), Hyperion CDA68404
- Queen of Hearts (2024), Hyperion CDA68453
- Radiant Dawn (2025), Hyperion CDA68465
