= Judith Bingham =

Judith Bingham OBE
- Born: 21 June 1952 (age 74); Nottingham, England
- Occupations: Composer, singer

Judith Bingham OBE (born 21 June 1952) is an English composer and mezzo-soprano singer, a member of the BBC Singers from 1983 to 1995. She is a fellow of the Royal Northern College of Music. Bingham won the 1977 BBC Young Composer Award, and was appointed an Officer of the Order of the British Empire in 2020 for services to music.

== Early life and education ==
Bingham was born on 21 June 1952, in Nottingham. Her parents are Jack Bingham and Peggy Bingham (née McGowan). She was educated at High Storrs Grammar School for Girls in Sheffield, and began learning singing from bass John Dethick from the age of 16. Bingham attended the Royal Academy of Music from 1970 to 1973, where she received the Principal’s Prize for Music in 1972 and was elected as an associate in 1997. Her teachers included Malcolm MacDonald, Eric Fenby, Alan Bush and John Hall (composition) and Jean Austin-Dobson and Eric Vietheer (singing).

After graduation, she continued her composition studies privately with Hans Keller (1974–80). Bingham won the BBC Young Composer Award in 1977, although she has since withdrawn the work that won.

== Career ==
From the late 1970s Bingham was a professional singer as well as a composer. She was a member of the BBC Singers from 1983 to 1995, and has composed music for them and the Finchley Children's Music Group.

Her compositions - including much choral music as well as orchestral, brass band and chamber music - have been widely performed and broadcast, and she has also composed music for television and radio. Giles Easterbrook identified two pivotal works - Chartres (1988) and Irish Tenebrae (1990) - as establishing her reputation as a composer and exhibiting her mature style: "an individual approach to structure based on organically-related, through-composed mosaics extended over long time-scales". He also identifies her interest in unusual instrumental combinations, and a recurring fondness for brass (ensembles and band) and the voice, combined in the 1996 BBC Proms commission Salt in the Blood. The chamber music and song shows her use of a wide range of literary sources, most recently in a series of works concerning Dr. Johnson and Boswell, including Strange Words (2018) and Hodge, Dr. Johnson’s Cat (2023).

Bingham was made a Fellow of the Royal Northern College of Music in 2005 and awarded an honorary doctorate by the University of Aberdeen in 2018.. She was appointed Officer of the Order of the British Empire (OBE) in the 2020 New Year Honours for services to music.

== Personal life ==
In 1985, she married Andrew Petrow but the marriage dissolved in 2011.

== List of works ==
Most of Bingham's compositions are voice or choral, but she also began composing for brass bands in the 1980s. She writes church and organ music, and has composed seven Missa Brevis. Works include:

- Flynn, opera, subtitled Music-theatre on the life and times of Errol Flynn, in three scenes, three solos, four duets, a mad song and an interlude, 1977–78.
- Chartres (orchestral), 1988
- Irish Tenebrae, (choral), 1990, rev. 1992 and 2007
- Beyond Redemption (orchestral), 1994–5
- The Temple at Karnak (orchestral), 1996
- Passaggio (concerto no.1 for bassoon and orchestra), 1998
- The Shooting Star (concerto for trumpet and orchestra), 1999
- Salt in the Blood (for choir and brass orchestra), 1995
- The Darkness Is No Darkness (for choir and organ), 1993
- Chapman's Pool, piano trio, 1997
- The Snows Descend (for brass orchestra), 1997
- First Light (for choir and brass orchestra), 2001
- Bright Spirit (for wind ensemble), 2001
- Mass 2003
- The Secret Garden (Botanical fantasy for SATB and organ), 2004
- Shadow Aspect (for choir, youth choir, organ and timpani), 2009. Commissioned by Edinburgh Royal Choral Union for its 150th anniversary season
- Leonardo (concerto no.2 for bassoon and thirteen strings), 2012
- The Angel of Mons (concerto for oboe and thirteen strings), 2014
- Ghostly Grace (for choir and organ), 2015
- Watch With Me (Anthem for Somme 100 Vigil), 2016
- Strange Words, tenor voice and piano, 2018
- Mozart's Pets (Suite of five vignettes for woodwind orchestra, 2021. Commissioned by Shea Lolin and the Bloomsbury Woodwind Ensemble and premiered at St James, Clerkenwell on Saturday 20 November 2021. The piece was subsequently recorded with the Czech Philharmonic Wind Ensemble in 2023, conducted by Shea Lolin.
- Barnaby Rudge (concerto for clarinet and thirteen strings), 2022
- Hodge, Dr. Johnson's Cat, for Bb clarinet and tenor/speaker, 2023
- Elsewhere (Clarinet quintet), 2024
