= Sofi Jeannin =

Swedish choral conductor and mezzo-soprano

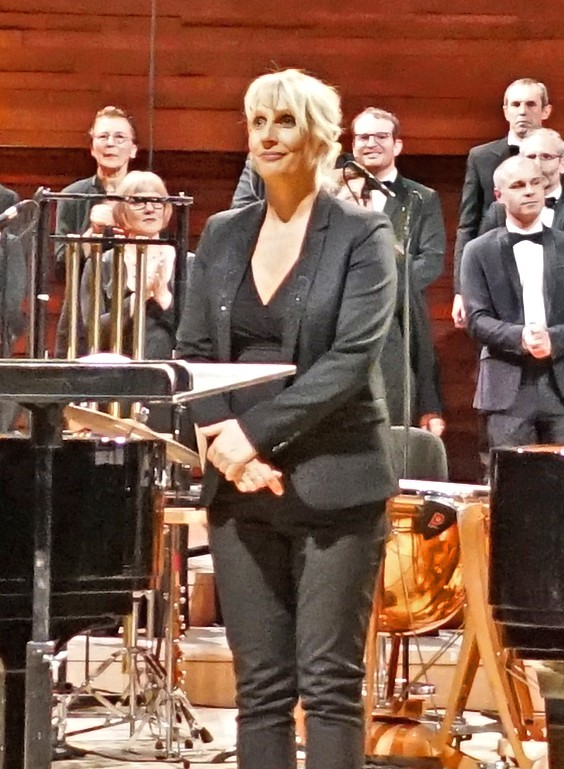
Sofi Jeannin

Sofi Jeannin (born 6 September 1976) is a Swedish choral conductor and mezzo-soprano.

== Biography ==
Born in Stockholm to a Swedish mother and a French father, Jeannin grew up in Lindesberg, following her parents' divorce when she was age 8. In her youth, Jeannin studied piano and singing. She continued her musical education at the Conservatoire de Nice, where her instructors included Bertrand Dutour de Salvert. Jeannin additionally studied at the Royal Academy of Music in Stockholm, where she also sang with the institution's vocal ensemble.

In the UK, Jeannin continued studies in choral conducting at the Royal College of Music (London), where her teachers included Paul Spicer. As a mezzo-soprano, she began to sing with London Voices in 2005. In 2005, Jeannin joined the faculty of the Royal College of Music Junior Department, teaching singing and choral singing, and has also taught at Imperial College. At the RCM, in November 2006, Jeannin conducted the UK premiere of Consolation I by Helmut Lachenmann.

From 2006 to 2008, Jeannin taught choral conducting at the Conservatoire d'Évry. Since March 2008, she has directed the Maîtrise de Radio France, with responsibility for amateur choir training, free choral instruction for young people, and work with the neighbourhood children of Bondy. In July 2015, she became music director of the Choeur de Radio France, the first woman to hold the title. Her tenure with the Choeur de Radio France was through the 2017-2018 season.

In January 2017, Jeannin first guest-conducted the BBC Singers in a concert at St Paul's Church, Knightsbridge. In May 2017, the BBC announced her appointment as the next chief conductor of the BBC Singers, effective July 2018. She is the first female conductor to be named to the post, and the first female conductor to be named chief conductor of a BBC classical music ensemble. Jeannin made her debut at The Proms in August 2017. with the BBC Singers and the City of London Sinfonia. In April 2022, the BBC announced the extension of Jeannin's contract as chief conductor of the BBC Singers through 2026. She concluded her tenure as chief conductor of the BBC Singers at the close of the 2025-2026 season.

In March 2024, Ars Nova Copenhagen announced the appointment of Jeannin as its chief conductor, the first female conductor ever named to the post, with immediate effect, with an initial contract of 3 years.

== Awards and honours ==
Jeannin received the medal of the Worshipful Company of Musicians of London in 2005. Her other honours include:

- Chevalier des Arts et des Lettres (2009)
- Chevalier des Palmes Académiques (2018)
- Ordre national du Mérite (2021)

Cultural offices
Preceded by Matthias Brauer	Music Director, Choeur de Radio France; 2015–2018	Succeeded by Martina Batič
Preceded by David Hill	Chief Conductor, BBC Singers; 2018–2026	Succeeded by Owain Park
Preceded by Paul Hillier	Chief Conductor, Ars Nova Copenhagen; 2024–present	Succeeded by incumbent
