= BBC Chorus =

There have been three choirs named The BBC Chorus in the history of the British Broadcasting Corporation.

1. Today's BBC Symphony Chorus. Founded in 1928 as the BBC National Chorus, it changed its name to the BBC Chorus in 1932, before changing it again in 1935 to the BBC Choral Society (going on to adopt its current name in 1977).
2. A 42-strong professional chorus developed in the 1930s. It would perform either alone or with the BBC Choral Society as a "choir within a choir". It was abolished in 1961 following changes to the BBC's choral structures.
3. Today's BBC Singers. Founded in 1924 as a 16-strong BBC Wireless Chorus, and formally renamed The BBC Singers in 1935, it was expanded to 28 in 1961 and renamed The BBC Chorus as part of reforms to the BBC's choral set-up. It was then renamed The BBC Singers once more in 1972.

== History ==
Founded in late 1922, the BBC's initial output was heavily music oriented. The General Manager, John Reith, made arrangements with Percy Pitt, musical director of the British National Opera Company, to broadcast operatic performances from the Royal Opera House, and by May 1923 Pitt was on the BBC pay-roll as a part-time musical advisor. Under Pitt's guidance, in-house musical ensembles such as the "2LO Dance Band", the "2LO Military Band", the "2LO Light Orchestra", and the "2LO Octette" were developed, and the BBC began broadcasting symphony orchestra concerts in the same year.

By 1924, the company felt it was in a position to develop its in-house choral output. Stanford Robinson was engaged as chorus master, and he proceeded to form a 16-voice choir, the BBC Wireless Chorus, made up entirely of professional singers, which was called upon to rehearse and perform on-air near daily. A larger choir, the BBC Choir, was developed for bigger works, recording Handel's Messiah in 1927 and Gounod's Faust in 1929–30, both with Thomas Beecham; a vocal octet, the BBC Wireless Singers, was created using Wireless Chorus singers as a semi-separate entity; and in 1928 a full sized symphony chorus was created, named the BBC National Chorus. This last, which recorded Elijah under Stanford Robinson in 1930, was renamed The BBC Chorus in 1932.

Significant changes to the BBC's choral set-up came in 1934–5 with the appointment of Leslie Woodgate as the corporation's chorus master. Under him, three distinct but inter-related choirs were established. The Wireless Chorus, with its sub-group the Wireless Singers, remained a 16-person group, entirely professional, paid a weekly salary, and rehearsing and performing daily; Woodgate however renamed it The BBC Singers, and divided it into Section-A and Section-B, each of 8 people. Section-A specialised in "madrigals and modern music", and was paid £1 per week more than Section-B, which specialised in light music, "part-songs and glee, and other small types"; the two sections would sometimes combine in bigger or complex works.

Section-B of the BBC Singers also formed the core of the BBC's new mid-sized choir, The BBC Chorus. This was a choir of 42 professional singers, tasked with performing the more complicated choral pieces broadcast by the BBC considered unsuitable for an amateur chorus. The Chorus was sometimes sub-divided into Sections-A, -B, and -C, and also into the BBC Men's Chorus and the BBC Women's Chorus: the Men's Chorus was a popular presence, performing "students songs, chanties, and so on", with the accompanist Ernest Lush delivering commentary from the piano; the Women's Chorus was less frequently heard, Woodgate on one occasion explaining "not many listeners are keen about women's voices over the air". Unlike the BBC Singers, the BBC Chorus (and its subdivisions) had fewer performances commitments on the BBC schedules, and so rehearsed less frequently. Its numbers also varied from performance to performance - anywhere between 9 and the full 42 might be required in any performance, and its numbers were occasionally augmented.

The BBC Chorus, in turn, served as a core section of what was now to be called The BBC Choral Society (the former BBC Chorus). This choir was made up of 250 people- all amateurs, excepting the 42 professionals of the BBC Chorus, who acted as a semi-chorus where required, and supported the amateurs in challenging works. The Choral Society was the main performer in symphony concerts, and was admired for its capabilities in tackling modern music.

Besides its work within the BBC Choral Society, the BBC Chorus between 1935 and 1961 established a presence in broadcasts and in the recording studio as a creditable chorus in its own right, performing both with BBC orchestras and outside groups. Notable recordings include the broadcast premiere of Ralph Vaughan Williams Dona Nobis Pacem under the composer, and Delius' Sea Drift under Thomas Beecham.

The death of Leslie Woodgate in 1961 brought significant changes to the BBC's music department. His replacement Peter Gellhorn abolished the 42-member BBC Chorus; the BBC Singers were renamed the BBC Chorus, their subdivisions scrapped, and their numbers brought up from 16 to 28. The BBC Choral Society became an entirely amateur body, although the new BBC Chorus would sometimes perform alongside it in concerts.

The newly named BBC Chorus, significantly larger than the old BBC Singers, and sometimes augmented in numbers, was able to take on the mantel of its predecessor to a certain extent. Significant recordings would include the Faure Requiem under Nadia Boulanger and the Bach Mass in B Minor under Otto Klemperer. However, it reverted to its old name of the BBC Singers in 1972. Following this, the BBC Choral Society was, in 1977, renamed the BBC Symphony Chorus.

== Select discography ==
Recordings of the first BBC Chorus (today's BBC Symphony Chorus) and the third BBC Chorus (today's BBC Singers) can be found under the entries for those choirs.

Recordings of the second BBC Chorus include:

- Gustav Holst and Peter Warlock – Carols, 1936 – Leslie Woodgate, conductor; Peter Pears and Anne Wood, soloists
- Ralph Vaughan Williams - Dona Nobis Pacem, 1936 - Ralph Vaughan Williams, conductor; BBCSO; Renee Flynn and Roy Henderson, soloists
- Frederick Delius - Appalachia, 1938 - Thomas Beecham, conductor; LPO
- Vaughan Williams - Thanksgiving for Victory, 1944 - Adrian Boult, conductor; BBCSO, Thomas Coram Choir, Elsie Suddaby, Valentine Dyall
- Delius - Songs of Sunset, 1946 - Beecham, RPO, Nancy Evans, Redvers Llewellyn
- Arthur Bliss - Song of Welcome, 1954 - Bliss, Conductor; Joan Sutherland, John Cameron, Philharmonia

== See also ==
- BBC Orchestras and Singers

== Sources ==
- The B.B.C. Choral Society: Interview with Leslie Woodgate
- Sean Street, Historical Dictionary of British Radio, pp. 54–55
- BBC National Chorus
