= Stanford Robinson =

Robinson as Assistant Conductor of the Proms, circa 1950

Stanford Robinson OBE (5 July 1904 – 25 October 1984) was an English conductor and composer, known for his work with the BBC. He remained a member of the BBC's staff until his retirement in 1966, founding or building up the organisation's choral groups, both amateur and professional.

Between 1947 and 1950, Robinson was assistant conductor of the Proms, the summer and autumn concert series founded by Henry Wood and run by the BBC. Away from his BBC work, Robinson conducted at Covent Garden and in Australia.

== Biography ==
Robinson was born in Leeds, to a musical family. His father and grandfather were both organists and choirmasters, and his mother was a singer. He was named after the composer Sir Charles Villiers Stanford. He was educated at the Stationers' Company's School, leaving at the age of 15 and earning his living as a pianist at cinemas and restaurants. At the age of 18 he went to the Royal College of Music, where he studied under Adrian Boult, and conducted his first opera performances. While still at the College he took part in a BBC broadcast with the Wireless Orchestra, the forerunner of the BBC Symphony Orchestra.

From 1924 to 1966, Robinson was on the staff of the BBC. Until 1932 he was the BBC's first chorus master, in which capacity he established and developed the Wireless Chorus and Wireless Singers (now the BBC Singers) and the BBC National Chorus (now the BBC Symphony Chorus). He first appeared at the Proms in 1929, conducting the combined BBC choral groups in Delius's On Craig Dhu. He conducted at the Proms for the next two seasons, but not again until 1947. In addition to conducting for the BBC, Robinson also broadcast as a pianist.

From 1932 to 1946 Robinson was conductor of the BBC Theatre Orchestra, during which time he worked closely with Eric Coates, and director of music productions from 1936 to 1946. Away from his BBC work, he made his Covent Garden debut in 1937, conducting Die Fledermaus. The Times commented that if Robinson "did not always get the true Viennese swing of the waltz rhythms" he "kept the music gaily moving." The following year he returned to the Royal Opera House to conduct Faust with Heddle Nash, Lisa Perli and Harold Williams.

From 1946 to 1949, Robinson was the BBC's opera director and associate conductor of the BBC Symphony Orchestra. In 1947, he was appointed assistant conductor of the Proms, and conducted them regularly from then until 1950. He worked with the English Opera Group, introducing Britten's The Rape of Lucretia to London in 1947.

From 1949, Robinson was conductor of the BBC Opera Orchestra until 1953, and a BBC staff conductor from 1952 until his retirement from the BBC's staff in 1966. In 1951 he conducted the first London production of Alessandro Scarlatti's Il trionfo dell'onore. After 1950, Robinson was not favoured by the BBC officials who ran the Proms, and from then to 1970 he conducted only two Proms, the first in 1960, and the second in 1964 (Stravinsky's Pulcinella with Geraint Evans).

After retiring from the BBC, Robinson was chief conductor of the Queensland Symphony Orchestra in Brisbane, Australia in 1968 and 1969. In 1970 he was invited to conduct the Proms' Gilbert and Sullivan Night, instituted and popularised by Sir Malcolm Sargent. Robinson was invited back for the Gilbert and Sullivan Nights of 1971 and 1972, programming rarely heard numbers from Utopia, Limited and The Grand Duke in addition to established favourites.

=== Compositions ===
As composer or arranger, Robinson's works included the Savoy Dances arranged from Savoy operas, and original ballads including To You Eternally: A Prairie Lullaby and Love Me Not for Comely Grace, choral works like The Three Crows (for soloist, chorus and orchestra), a Rondo in C for two pianos, some short partsongs and a Valse Serenade for orchestra, which became the signature tune of his radio programme "Tuesday Serenade." He wrote a Suite de danse moderne, broadcast in 1924, and church works including settings of the Magnificat and the Nunc Dimittis.

=== Recordings ===
Robinson made many recordings, of which probably the best known is Eva Turner's 1928 recording of "In questa reggia" from Puccini's Turandot, on which Robinson conducts an unnamed orchestra. For Decca he recorded a series of discs of popular classics, which were highly praised by The Gramophone. With BBC forces Robinson made the first gramophone recording of Mendelssohn's Elijah in 1930. In 2007, Alan Blyth, the critic of Gramophone magazine, wrote that it remained "one of the most convincing" and that Robinson "gives the work the dramatic verve that it calls for". Robinson's LP recording of his Savoy Dances was reissued on CD.

=== Personal life ===
In 1926, Robinson married the singer Mavis Bennett; the marriage was unhappy, and by 1931 they were separated. Robinson later married the soprano Lorely Dyer; they had one daughter. Robinson's younger brother Eric Robinson (1908–74) was a popular conductor and broadcaster.

In 1972 Robinson was appointed an Officer (OBE) of the Order of the British Empire.

Robinson died in Brighton in 1984, aged 80.
