= Leslie Woodgate =

English choral conductor, composer and writer (1900–1961)

Hubert Leslie Woodgate OBE (15 April 1902 – 18 May 1961) was an English choral conductor, composer, and writer of books on choral music.

He was born in London, and educated at Westminster School and the Royal College of Music. During the 1920s, he was organist at several London churches. In 1928, he joined the BBC; in 1934, was appointed BBC chorus master, taking responsibility for the BBC Chorus, the BBC's large amateur chorus, and the Wireless Chorus and Wireless Singers, made up of professionals.

That same year (1934), he conducted the world and broadcast premiere of A Boy Was Born by Benjamin Britten. During the 1930s, he was musical director of the London and North Eastern Railway Musical Society: it comprised several amateur male-voice choirs which combined annually for a performance in London; he wrote music for them. He conducted the Kentucky Minstrels, a popular singing group on BBC radio during and immediately after the War.

On Palm Sunday, 25 March 1945, Woodgate led the BBC Chorus is the world premiere of Poulenc's wartime cantata Figure humaine for unaccompanied double chorus, which was sung in English. In 1946, he conducted the Wireless Chorus at a Henry Wood Promenade Concert in William Walton's Where Does the Uttered Music Go? He was appointed OBE in 1959.

He married Lena Mason in 1926; they had one son. In the 1950s the family were living at 6, The Paddocks, Wembley Park in Middlesex. He died in 1961, at the age of 59.

Most of his compositions were choral works, but he sometimes wrote for instrumental and orchestral forces. His Op. 1, Hymn to the Virgin and The White Island for male soloist, male choir and orchestra, earned him a Carnegie Prize in 1923. He was an enthusiastic promoter of both amateur and professional singing: his Penguin Song Book of 1951 appears to have been the first musical score published by Penguin Books, and was directed at amateur singers.

== Writings ==
- The Chorus Master. London: Ascherberg, Hopwood & Crew Ltd. 1944. ASIN B001PHGAJW.
- The Choral Conductor. London: Ascherberg, Hopwood & Crew Ltd. 1949. ASIN B0019MDB9K.
- The Penguin Song Book. London: Penguin Books. 1951. ASIN B0007KDM4Y.
- The Penguin Part Song Book. London: Penguin Books. 1955. ASIN B0000D5D3N.
- The Puffin Song Book. London: Penguin Books. 1961. ASIN B0000D5D3T.
