= Peter Gellhorn =

German composer and conductor (1912–2004)

- Born: Hans Fritz Gellhorn; October 24, 1912; Breslau, Germany (now Wrocław, Poland)
- Died: February 13, 2004 (aged 91) London, England
- Genres: Classical
- Occupations: Conductor, composer, pianist, teacher
- Years active: 1930s–1990s

Peter Gellhorn (born Hans Fritz Gellhorn; October 24, 1912 – February 13, 2004) was a German conductor, composer, pianist, and teacher. In 1935, he settled in England, where he continued his career thereafter.

== Life ==
Gellhorn, the son of an architect, was born as Hans Fritz Gellhorn in Breslau, Germany (now Wrocław, Poland). He came from a musical family and was educated at the Schiller Realgymnasium, at Berlin University and at the Berlin Music Academy. He was a pupil of the composer Franz Schreker. When the National Socialists came to power he was obliged to leave Germany (since his father was Jewish) and settled in England in 1935.

In 1937 he recorded a collection of twenty Songs by Famous Russian Composers for Parlophone Records with the Russian tenor Vladimir Rosing. The reviewer in The Gramophone wrote, "In the person of Hans Gellhorn Rosing found his best accompanist."

Gellhorn was interned in Mooragh Camp on the Isle of Man as an enemy alien from 1939 to 1941. Ralph Vaughan Williams intervened to help get him released. He finally became a naturalized citizen in 1947 and changed his name to Peter.

Working with the Vic-Wells Opera during and after the war led to an invitation from David Webster to join the staff of Covent Garden Opera when it re-opened after the war. He became assistant to music director Karl Rankl and conducted there many times from June 1947 onward. During his later career he also conducted at Glyndebourne, and with the Carl Rosa Opera Company. From 1961 he became Director of the BBC Chorus (later BBC Singers), conducting them in works such as Holst's The Cloud Messenger and Rubbra's In Die et Nocte Canticum. In 1967 Gellhorn worked with Peter and Gillian Hunt to set up the annual educational music festival Opera Barga in central Italy, acting as the musical director.

Gellhorn married the actress Olive Layton (1918–2009, daughter of the economist Lord Layton) in 1943; they had two sons and two daughters. After retiring from the BBC in 1972 he taught at the Guildhall School of Music and the Royal College of Music, coached singers and other musicians from his home in south-west London, and played as part of a piano duo and as an accompanist. The young George Benjamin studied both the piano and composition with Gellhorn until the age of 15. After three years, Gellhorn arranged for Benjamin to continue his lessons in Paris with Olivier Messiaen, whom he had known for many years.

== Works ==
As a young man in Berlin, Gellhorn was already composing, examples being the four movement Kleine Suite for oboe and piano (1932) and the String Quartet No 1 (1933-4), both in a highly chromatic though still tonal style. A second string quartet (1935, by which time he was in England), and Totentanz (1937), a work for two pianos, continued in much the same vein. There was also a Bach-influenced neo-classical work, the Trio Suite for two violins and viola. But also in 1937 he composed the more introverted and melancholy Intermezzo for violin and piano, written for his friend Maria Lidka. This melancholy vein continued with his first setting of English words (by Walter de la Mare): Autumn (1938).

Then came his internment, during which The Cats (a short movement for strings) and Mooragh (for male choir and strings, setting words by F.F.Beiber) were composed. There was a male choir in the Mooragh camp, and Bieber was a fellow internee.

Following the war Gellhorn was much less prolific as a composer. His later works include Thoughts on a Chinese Tune for two clarinets and piano duet (1976), the Dialogue for violin and viola with string orchestra (1977), a second Trio Suite, for children (1982), and a final song, Aedh wishes for the Cloths of Heaven (1995).

Performances (Royal College of Music Project)

- Kleine Suite for oboe and piano (1932)
- String Quartet No 1 in five movements (1933-4)
- Capriccio for violin and piano (1936, dedicated to Max Rostal)
- Sonata for two pianos (1936)
- Intermezzo for violin and piano (1937)
- Autumn, song (1938)
- Andante for string quartet (1940)
- The Cats for string orchestra (without double bass) or string quartet (1940)
- Mooragh for male voices and strings (1940)
- Aedh Wishes for the Cloths of Heaven, song (1995)

== See also ==
- List of émigré composers in Britain
