= Sécheresses =

1937 cantata by Francis Poulenc

Sécheresse
- Cantata by Francis Poulenc
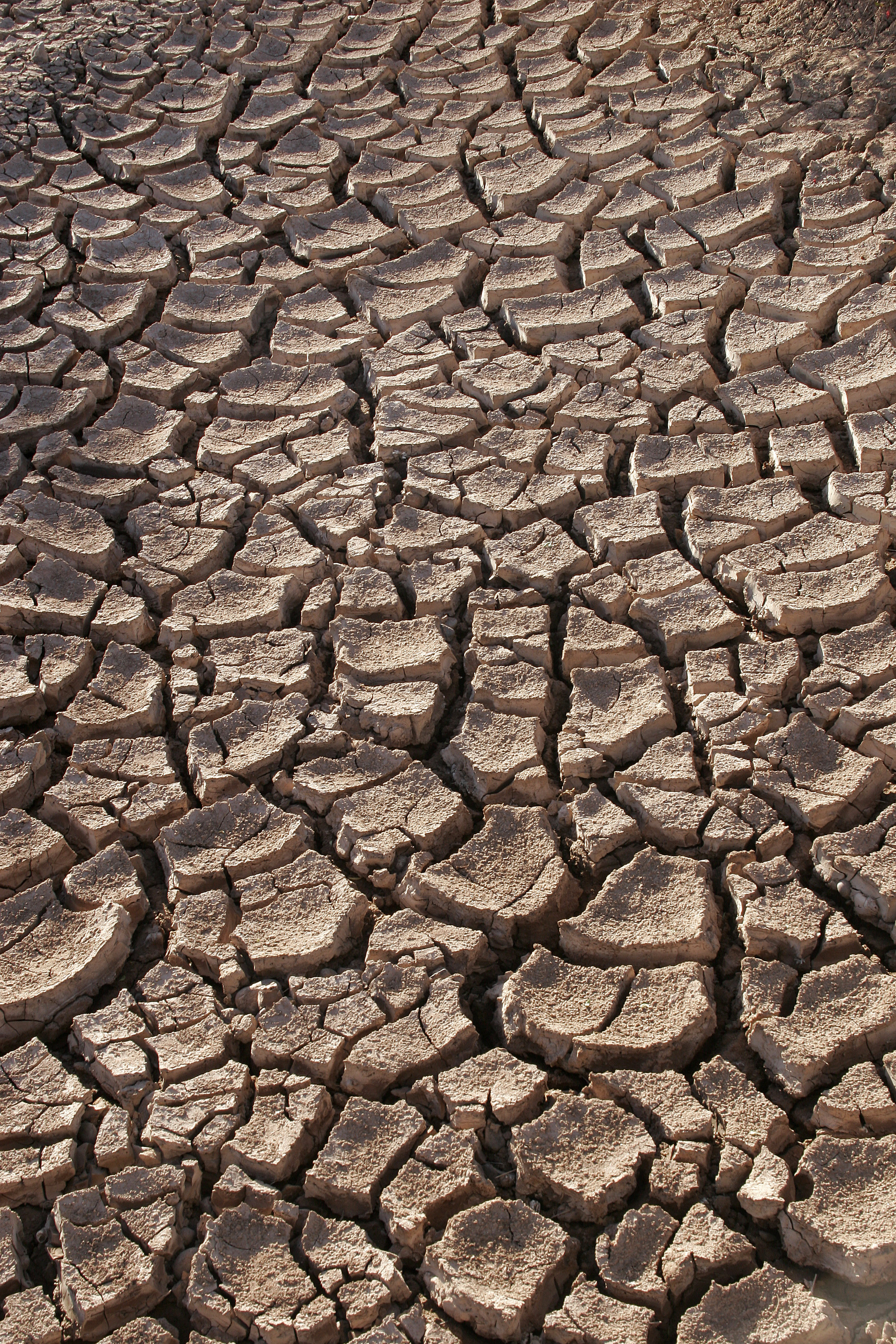
- Catalogue: FP 90
- Text: Edward James
- Language: French
- Composed: 1937
- Dedication: Yvonne de Casa Fuerte

Premiere
- Date: 2 April 1938
- Location: Salle Pleyel, Paris

Sécheresses (Drought), FP 90, is a cantata by Francis Poulenc for mixed choir (SATB) composed in 1937 on poems by Edward James who commissioned it. It was regarded as a failure when it was premiered in 1938, but a great success when it was performed again in 1953.

== History ==
It was the British poet Edward James who commissioned this work from the composer. Edward James (1907–1984) was also a rich patron of the arts, a friend of painters such as Salvador Dalí, René Magritte and Leonor Fini, but also of musicians such as the conductor Igor Markevitch. He offered Francis Poulenc twice the sum that Winnaretta Singer had paid for Poulenc's Organ Concerto.

Francis Poulenc composed this cantata on four texts by Edward James between September and December 1937. Two of the texts used had been published in the journal of surrealist inspiration Minotaure. The composer dedicated his work to Yvonne de Casa Fuerte, a violinist who had married the Marquis of Casa Fuerte.

The work was premiered at salle Pleyel in Paris on 2 April 1938 by the Concerts Colonne orchestra and the singers of Lyon under the direction of Paul Paray. This first performance was a failure with the audience, and the composer wanted to destroy the score of his work, but Georges Auric dissuaded him.

Sécheresses was played again much later, on 28 September 1953, by the Paris Radio Symphony Orchestra under the direction of Eugène Bigot, and on 4 November 1953 at Théâtre des Champs-Élysées by the Orchestre de la Société des concerts du Conservatoire under the direction of Georges Tzipine. The work was then a great success.

== Sections ==
The cantata has a duration of about 17 minutes. It is structured in four movements:

1. Les sauterelles
2. Le village abandonné
3. Le faux avenir
4. Le squelette de la mer

== Discography ==
- Denise Duval, choirs of Élisabeth Brasseur, and Orchestre de la Société des concerts du Conservatoire directed by Georges Tzipine, 1963 (EMI).
- Chœur de Radio France and Nouvel Orchestre philharmonique de Radio France directed by Georges Prêtre, 1983 (Warner/Erato).
