= English Cornett and Sackbut Ensemble =

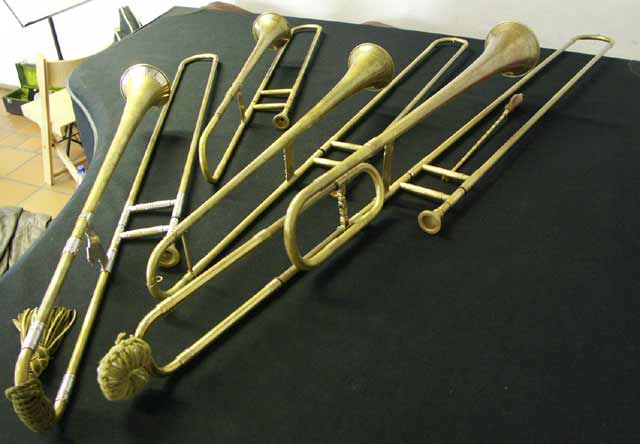
Sackbutt

The English Cornett & Sackbut Ensemble are an early music group specializing in music for cornett and sackbut. Formed in 1993, they perform in early music concerts and festivals on period instruments.

St John's, Smith Square is amongst the venues at which they have performed. Festivals include the York Early Music Festival.

In 2018 they worked with the National Centre for Early Music to run the NCEM Young Composers Award.

== Discography ==
Recorded works include:

- 2017: Monteverdi: the other vespers
- 2014: The Spy's Choirbook by Alamire; with David Skinner under the Obsidian records label
- 2013: Cantiones Sacrae Octonis Vocibus by Peter Philips; with the Choir of Royal Holloway under the Hyperion label
- 2002: Byrd - the Great Service in the Chapel Royal, with Steven Devine under the Chaconne label
- 2001: Accendo, with music from Claudio Monteverdi, under the Deux-Elles label

== Awards ==
- 2015 Gramophone Classical Music Awards:Early music, for The Spy's Choirbook by Alamire; with David Skinner under the Obsidian records label.
