= Yorkshire Planetarium =

Planetarium in Yorkshire, England (2007–2009)

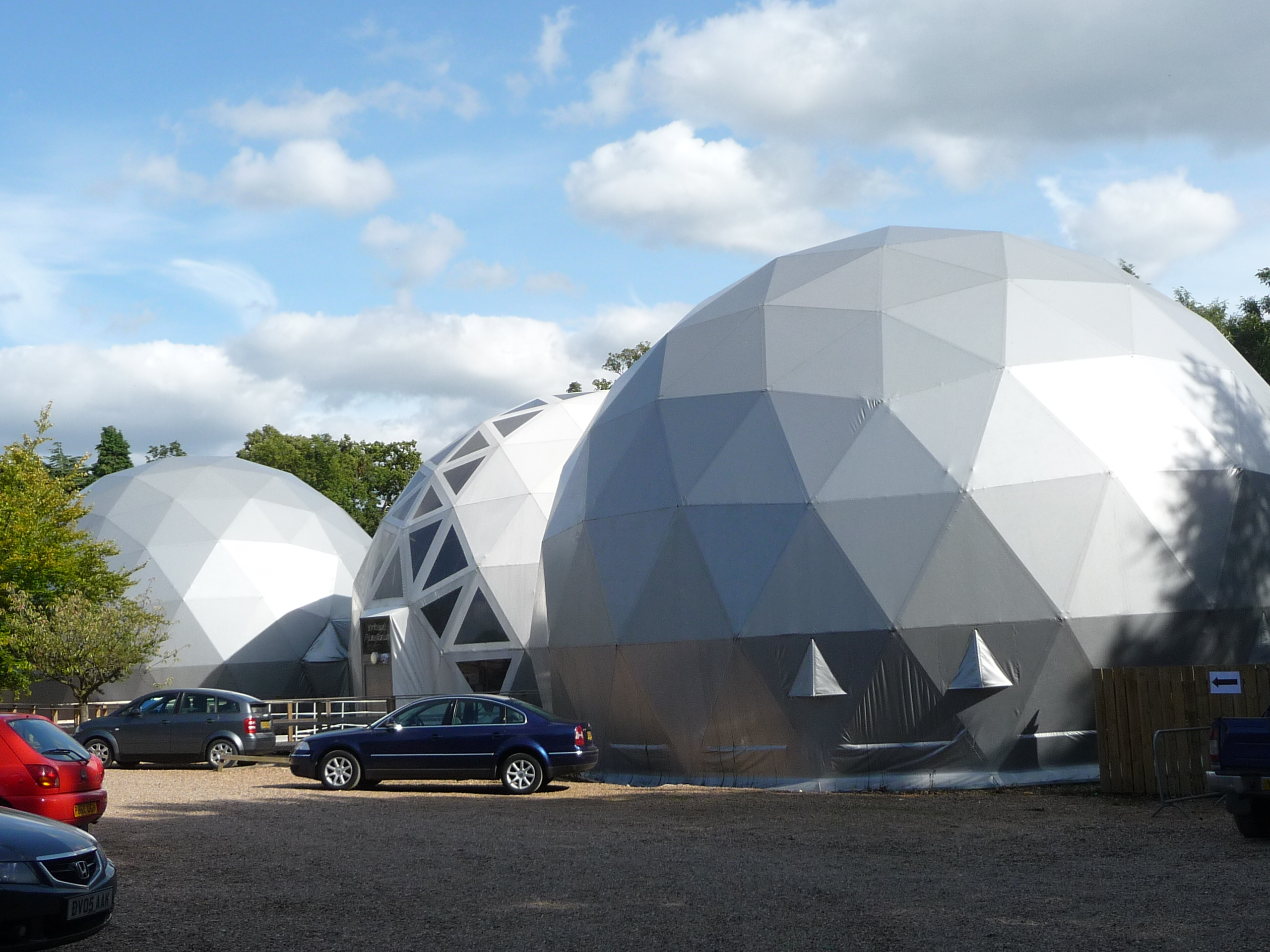
Planetarium Harewood

The Yorkshire Planetarium was a planetarium in the grounds of Harewood House, near Leeds, West Yorkshire, England, from May 2007 until October 2009. The Yorkshire Planetarium organisation announced that it was laying plans for a permanent base in Bradford and until that was developed it would tour various locations during the International Year of Astronomy 2009.

The planetarium at Harewood consisted of three linked 16-metre (52 ft) geodesic domes designed by Amelia Y'Mech, one of which one was dedicated to the planetarium itself while the others were used as the main entrance, with a 10-metre (33 ft) high climbing frame and a 3D theatre featuring 'A Poets Journey through Space', a locally made 3D production with poetry by Ian Macmillan, graphics by Vex films and produced by Richard Everiss.

The planetarium was privately funded until it was sold to Bradford College, funded by the Regional Development Fund in April 2008.

== The planetarium ==
The main attraction was the 12-metre (39 ft) diameter planetarium dome. There were guided tours of the sky by a live astronomer in the dark dome. Stars and planets were projected onto a negative pressure screen inside the dome by a Carl Zeiss ZKP4 star projector. This enabled visitors to gaze at the stars in a projection of the sky without the hindrance of light pollution and cloud cover while they lay on comfortable mats or deck chairs.
