= Yorkshire Bach Choir =

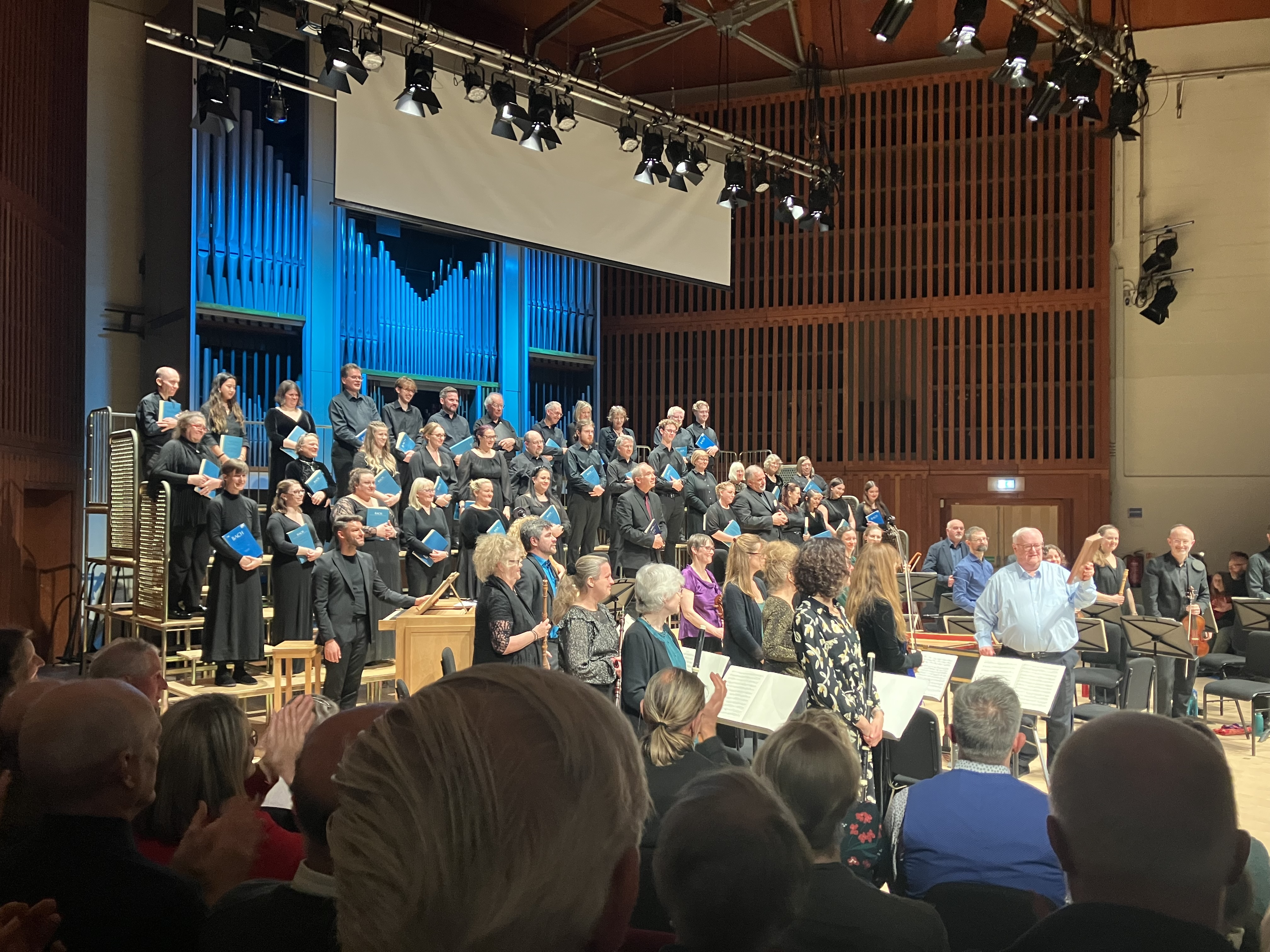
Yorkship Bach Choir and Yorkshire Baroque Soloists following the Bach St Matthew Passion, 2025

Yorkshire Bach Choir was founded in 1979 by Peter Seymour. They run an annual concert series, currently at St Lawrence's Church, York and in the Jack Lyons Concert Hall of the University of York. It is one of the UK's leading chamber choirs, specialising in renaissance and baroque music.

The choir has also appeared at the Leipzig Bach Festival, the York Early Music Festival and other festivals; it has recorded for ITV and Channel 4 as well as on many occasions for WDR-Köln and BBC Radio 3 in programmes from Monteverdi to Haydn.

== Repertoire ==
Although its work focuses on 17th and 18th century music, its repertoire extends back to 16th century polyphony and includes newly commissioned works including those by Christopher Fox and John Paynter. It also uses historical research into performing practices as the basis for their performances.

Visiting soloists have included Lucy Russell.

== Recordings ==
- J. S. Bach: The six motets, 1997, ASIN B0000265BL, Publisher: ICC.
- Victoria Psalms & Motets, 2003, ASIN B000086EMH, Publisher: Classic Print
- Festive Mass at the Imperial Court Vienna 1648, 2007, ASIN B000MRA7B8, Publisher: Alto
- J. S. Bach: Mass in B Minor, 2011.
