= National Centre for Early Music =

Early music organization based in York, England

Coordinates: 53.956403°N 1.073322°W

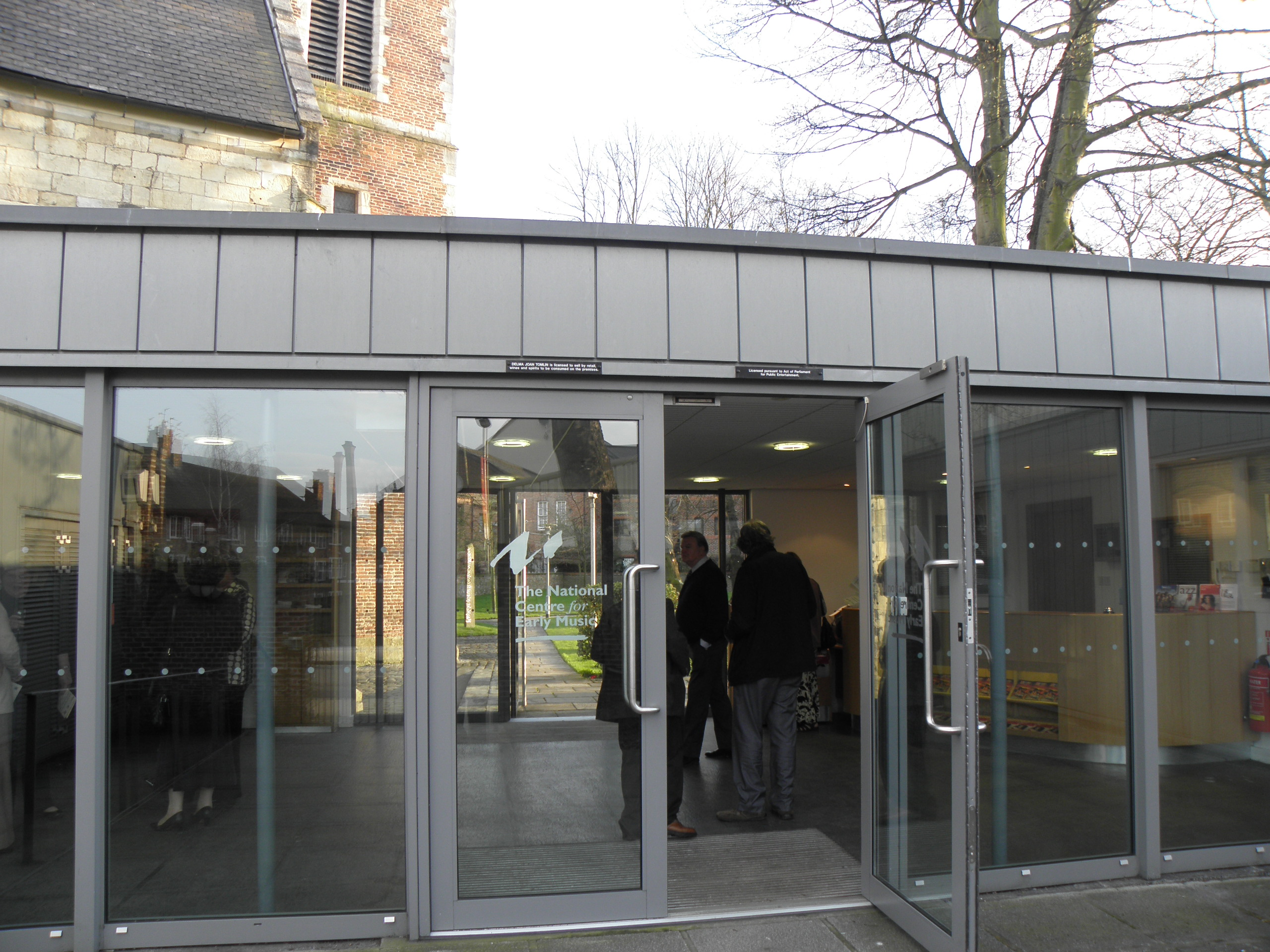
- Outside of the NCEM
- Formation: 2000; 25 years ago
- Purpose: encouragement, promotion and dissemination of early music
- Headquarters: York, England, UK
- Key people: Delma Tomlin (director)
- Website: www.ncem.co.uk

The National Centre for Early Music (NCEM) is an organisation which encourages, promotes and disseminates early music. Located in York, England, it is based in the converted and extended, Grade I listed medieval church of St Margaret, Walmgate. Each year, the NCEM organises the York Early Music Festival.

== Overview ==
Designed by van Heyningen and Haward Architects, the centre was opened in April 2000. It was created, with the aid of a grant from the National Lottery and partnership money from organisations such as English Heritage. The buildings of the Centre include a performance space (in the former church) and facilities for conferences and other events and recordings. Historic keyboard instruments are available for hire. The church building, which had been redundant for some years, was upgraded to meet the needs of varying types and size of performance as well as many alternative uses such as teaching, conferences and exhibitions. The roof has been rebuilt for enhanced acoustics, and there are baffles to allow the acoustics to be modified.

The annual York Early Music Festival is organised from the church and is administered through the York Early Music Foundation, a UK registered charity. During the rest of the year, the Foundation promotes an educational programme based at the National Centre: events include seminars, workshops and master classes. New music is also promoted, for example there is an annual Young Composers Award to encourage composers to work with early music groups.

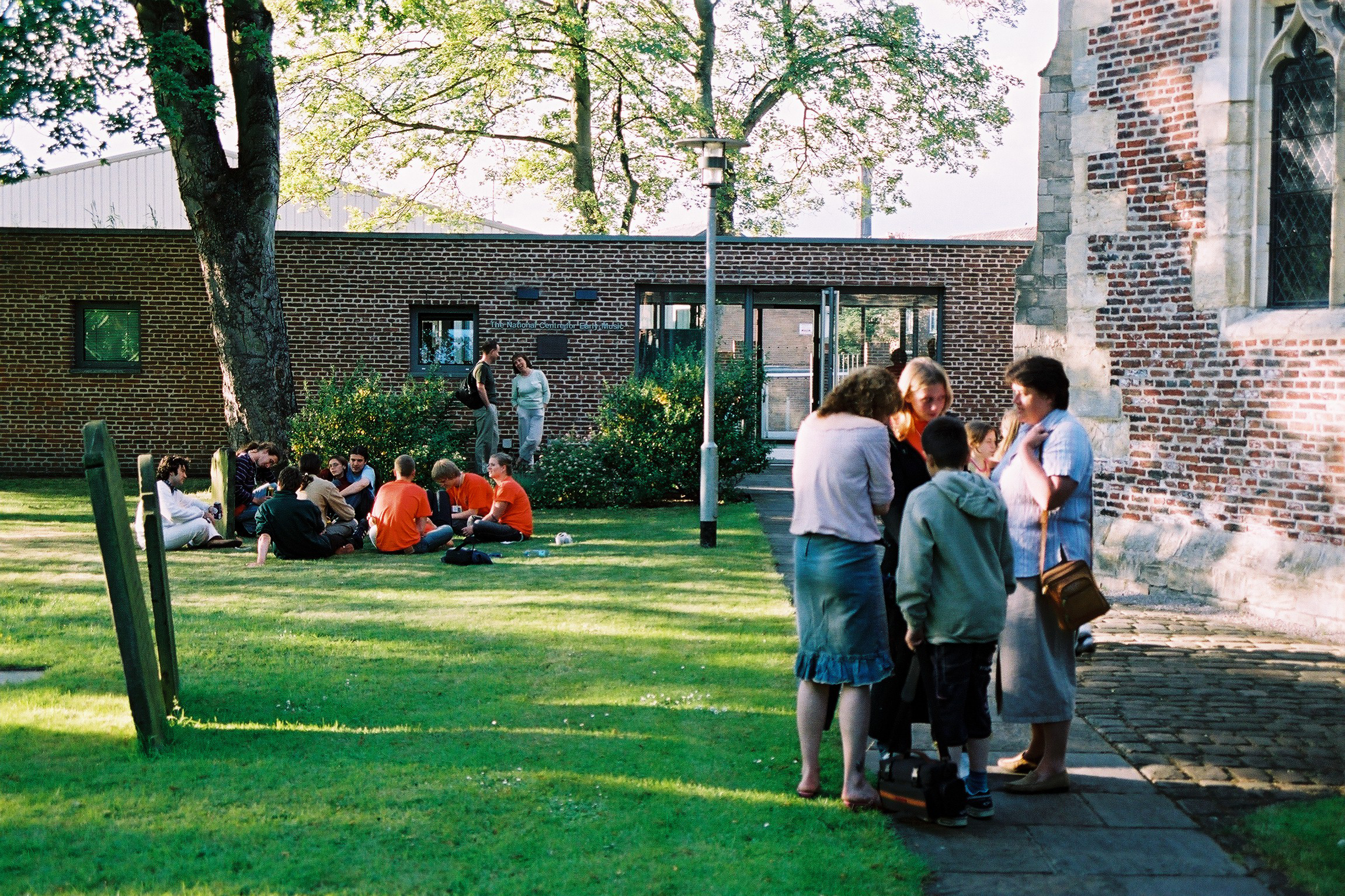
Outside the NCEM

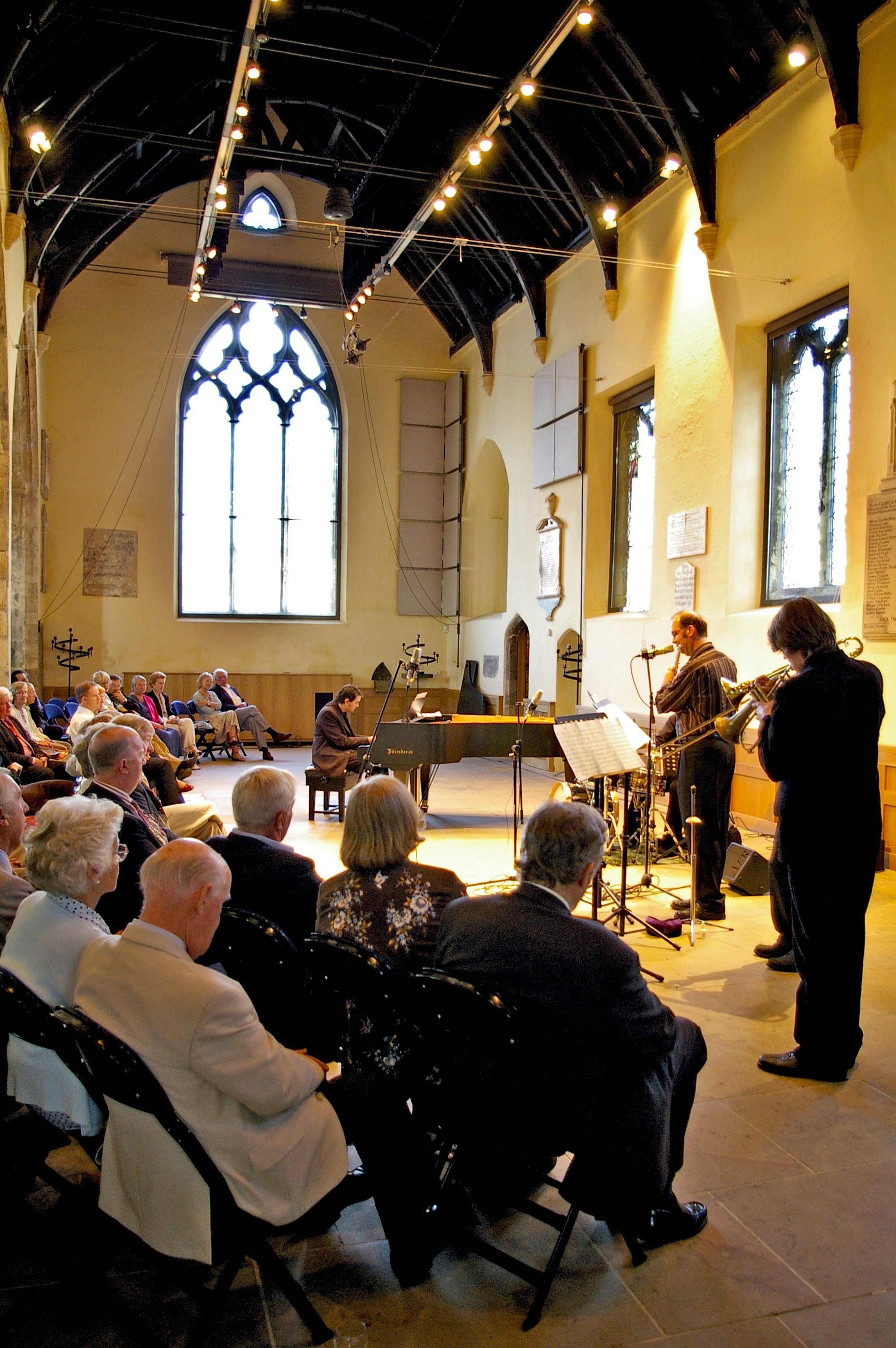
A performance at the centre

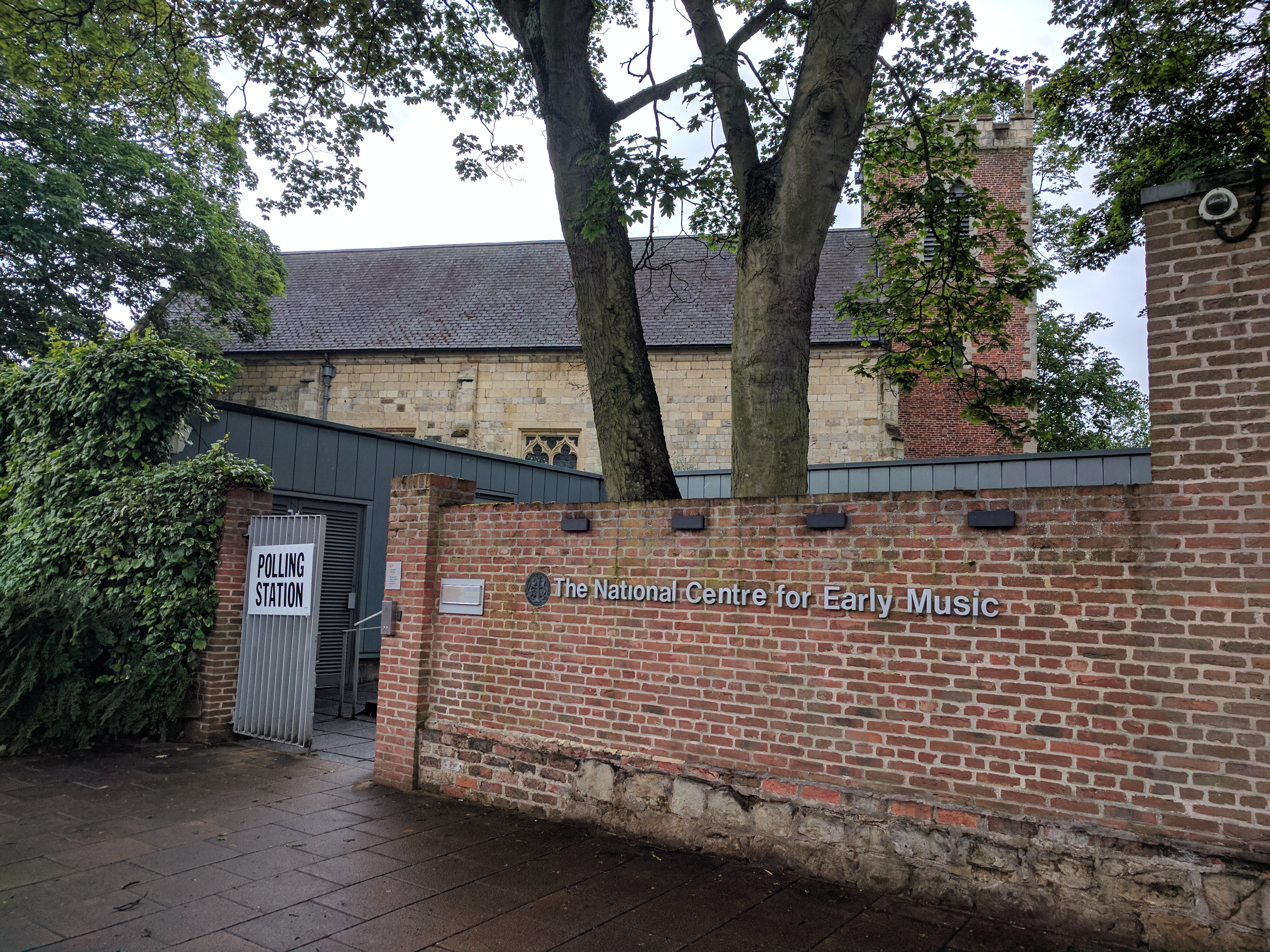
Polling station outside the NCEM

== See also ==
- Centre for Renaissance and Early Modern Studies
- English Cornett and Sackbut Ensemble
