= York Early Music Festival =

The York Early Music Festival is an English arts festival devoted mainly to classical music from the 18th century and earlier. It was established in 1977, and takes place in York each July, organised by the National Centre for Early Music, York. The performances are at various venues such as York Minster, the Sir Jack Lyons Concert Hall at the University of York and the National Centre for Early Music, St Margaret's, Walmgate. In 2008, events also took place at Harewood House and the National Railway Museum. In December there is also a Christmas Early Music Festival.

Artists who have appeared in the festival include

- Robin Blaze
- The Ebor Singers
- Emma Kirkby
- Ex Cathedra
- I Fagiolini
- Mahan Esfahani
- Giles Lewin
- Monica Huggett
- Josetxu Obregon
- The Orchestra of the Age of Enlightenment
- Rachel Podger
- Jordi Savall
- The Sixteen
- Hopkinson Smith
- Taverner Consort and Players
- Yorkshire Bach Choir
