= Harewood House =

Country house in West Yorkshire, England

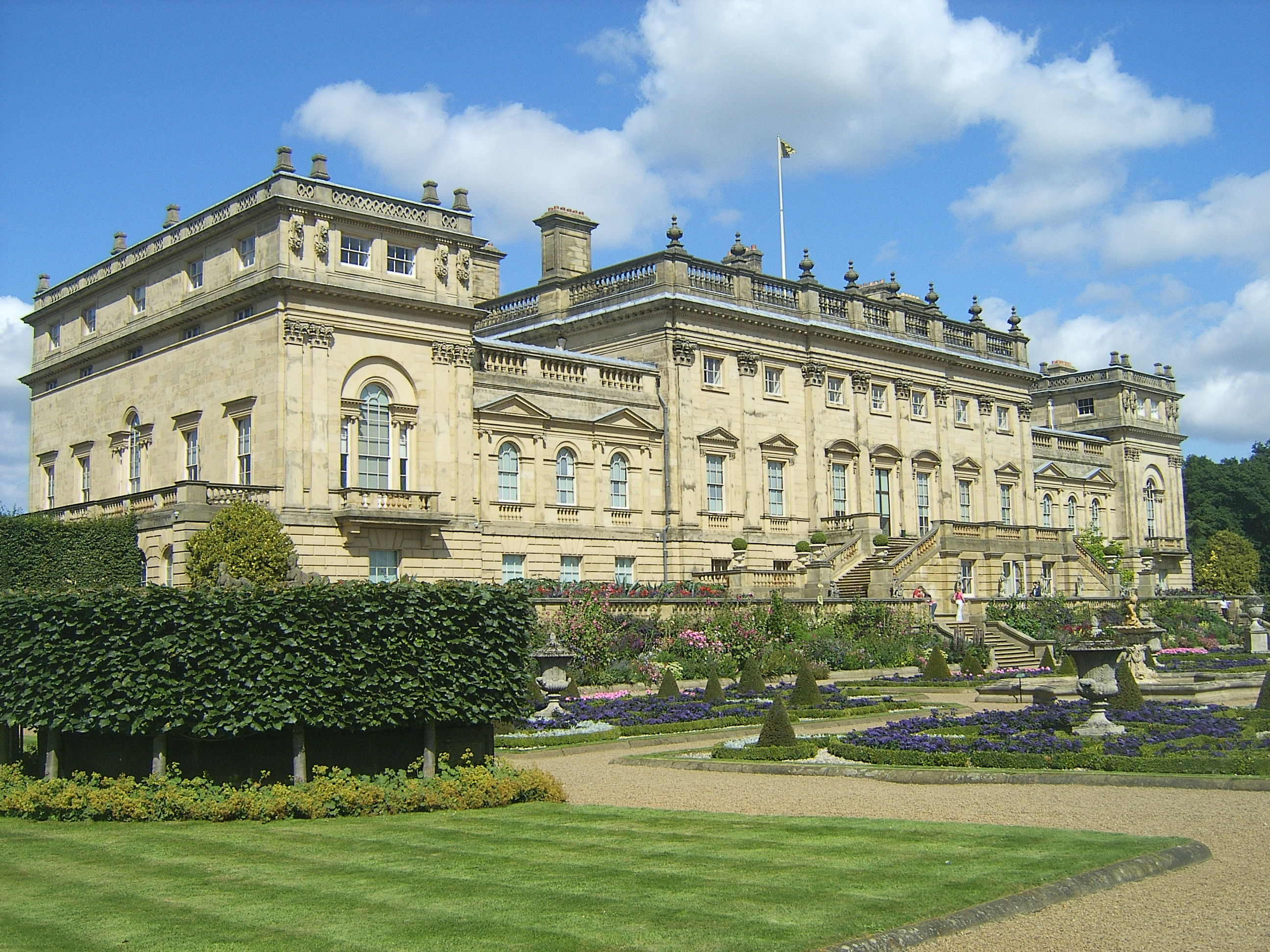
- Harewood House from the garden

General information
- Type: Stately home
- Architectural style: Palladian
- Location: Harewood, England
- Coordinates: 53°53′48″N 1°31′42″W
- Current tenants: Lascelles family
- Construction started: 1759
- Completed: 1771
- Client: Edwin Lascelles, 1st Baron Harewood
- Owner: Harewood House Trust

Design and construction
- Architects: John Carr; Robert Adam
- Designations: Grade I listed

Website
- www.harewood.org

Listed Building – Grade I
- Official name: Harewood House
- Designated: 30 March 1960
- Reference no.: 1225861

Harewood House (/ˈhɑːrwʊd/ HAR-wuud, /ˈhɛər-/ HAIR-) (Note: There is debate as to the exact pronunciation of the word 'Harewood'. In the 18th century, the customary pronunciation (and spelling) was Harwood and this pronunciation for both house and title is used by Harewood House and the Earl of Harewood. The pronunciation "hairwood" is generally used for the village.) is a country house in Harewood, West Yorkshire, England. Designed by architects John Carr and Robert Adam, it was built between 1759 and 1771, for Edwin Lascelles, 1st Baron Harewood, a wealthy West Indian plantation and slave owner. The landscape was designed by Lancelot "Capability" Brown and spans 1,000 acres (400 hectares) at Harewood.

Still home to the Lascelles family, Harewood House is a member of the Treasure Houses of England, a marketing consortium for ten of the foremost historic homes in the country. The house is a Grade I listed building and a number of features in the grounds and courtyard have been listed as Grade I, II* and II.

== History ==
=== Early history ===
The Harewood estate was created in its present size by merging two adjacent estates, the Harewood Castle estate based on Harewood Castle and the Gawthorpe estate based on the Gawthorpe Hall manor house (not to be confused with the Gawthorpe Hall near Burnley in Lancashire). The properties were combined when the Wentworths of Gawthorpe, who inherited the estate from the Gascoignes, bought the neighbouring Harewood estate from the Ryther family. The combined estate was sold to the London merchant Sir John Cutler in 1696, after whose death it passed to the Boulter family. They in turn sold it to the Lascelles family in 1721.

=== The Lascelles family ===
In the late seventeenth century members of the Lascelles family purchased plantations in the West Indies, and the income generated allowed Henry Lascelles to purchase the estate in 1738; his son, Edwin Lascelles, 1st Baron Harewood, a wealthy plantation and slave owner, built the house between 1759 and 1771 to replace Gawthorpe Hall, the original manor house on the estate.

Edwin employed the services of John Carr, an architect practising in the north of England who had been employed by a number of prominent Yorkshire families, to design their new country houses. The foundations were laid in 1759 and the house was largely complete by 1765. Robert Adam submitted designs for the interiors, which were approved in 1765. Adam made a number of minor alterations to Carr's designs for the building's exterior including internal courtyards. The house remained largely untouched until the 1840s when Sir Charles Barry was employed by Henry Lascelles, 3rd Earl of Harewood, the father of thirteen children, to increase the accommodation. Barry added second storeys to each of the flanking wings to provide extra bedrooms, removed the south portico and created formal parterres and terraces.

=== 20th century ===
In 1922, Henry Lascelles, Viscount Lascelles married Princess Mary, the only daughter of George V. Initially living in the nearby Goldsborough Hall, the couple moved permanently into Harewood House on the death of Henry's father in 1929.

During the Second World War, the house acted as a resident convalescent hospital but by the late 1940s, the Princess Royal and her family had moved permanently back to Harewood, where the house and gardens were regularly opened to the public. The estate also hosted concerts connected with musical institutions including the Yorkshire Symphony Orchestra and the Leeds Musical Festival, of which the Princess was patron.

On 28 March 1965, the Princess was walking the grounds of Harewood when she suffered a fatal heart attack. Her elder son, Lord Harewood, the 7th earl, succeeded his father in 1947, and resided at Harewood. He was director of the Royal Opera House and later of the English National Opera; nearer to Harewood, he was a member of the Leeds Music Festival's executive committee and a patron of the Yorkshire Symphony Orchestra's concerts.

Since 1947 the estate's dower house, which lies outside the estate boundaries, has been leased out for use as an independent school.

=== 21st century ===
The house is the family seat of the Lascelles family, and home of David Lascelles, the eighth Earl. The house and grounds have been transferred into a trust ownership structure managed by Harewood House Trust and are open to the public for most of the year. Harewood won a Large Visitor Attraction of the Year award in the 2009 national Excellence in England awards.

Harewood houses a collection of paintings by masters of the Italian Renaissance, family portraits by Sir Joshua Reynolds, John Hoppner and Sir Thomas Lawrence, and modern art collected by the 7th Earl and Countess. Changing temporary exhibitions are held each season in the Terrace Gallery. Catering facilities in the house include Michelin-starred fine dining.

As well as tours of the house and grounds, Harewood has more than 100 acres (40 ha) of gardens, including a Himalayan garden and its stupa, an educational bird garden (closed February 2023), an adventure playground and the historic All Saints' Church with its alabaster tombs. From May 2007 to October 2008 the grounds contained Yorkshire's first planetarium, the Yorkshire Planetarium.

The Leeds Country Way passes through the Harewood Estate, to the south of the house and lake, as does the route of the White Rose Way.

In a 2005 documentary, David Lascelles spoke about his ancestors' links with the slave trade, and in 2007, as part of the BBC Look North programme, actor David Harewood visited the house and interviewed Lascelles, as his ancestors in Barbados had been enslaved by the Earls of Harewood. In March 2023, it was announced that a portrait of Harewood had been commissioned and would be hung in Harewood House.

== In popular culture ==
Artist J. M. W. Turner visited the house and painted the outdoor landscape in watercolour around 1797–98. The house was used as a filming location for the 1991 comedy film King Ralph. Since 1996, part of the estate has been developed as the village in the ITV soap opera Emmerdale, which had been based in two different Yorkshire villages since its inception 24 years earlier. Rock musician Elton John performed two concerts in the grounds in 1999. The ITV show Victoria starring Jenna Coleman and Tom Hughes has filmed at Harewood House.

On 1 July 2006, Irish pop band Westlife held a concert for their Face to Face Tour supporting their album Face to Face. Harewood House was used as a filming location for the 2019 Downton Abbey film in November 2018. The house was the location for BBC's Mary Berry's Country House at Christmas with Mary Berry, broadcast on Christmas Day 2018.

== Harewood Bird Garden & Farm Experience ==
Harewood Bird Garden & Farm Experience
- Interactive map of Harewood Bird Garden & Farm Experience
- Date opened: March 1970
- Date closed: 2023
- Location: Harewood House, Leeds, West Yorkshire, England
- Memberships: BIAZA,
- Major exhibits: Small collection of exotic birds and farm animals
- Website: www.harewood.org/grounds/grounds-bird-garden

The Bird Garden at Harewood House had a small collection of exotic bird species, of which more than 5 were listed as vulnerable or endangered by the IUCN. It was a member of the British and Irish Association of Zoos and Aquariums (BIAZA).

Birds that could be seen in the garden included Humboldt penguins, Chilean flamingos, Duyvenbode's lories and macaws.

In January 2023 the trustees of Harewood announced their decision to close the Bird Garden: the exact date would be announced later in the year. The Farm Experience would remain open. The area occupied by the Bird Garden would be redeveloped as a new woodland garden, including reinstating some historic walks. New homes would be found for all the birds. The trustees said that the last inspection had "identified many problems with the site's physical infrastructure" which would require £4 million to be spent, and they "had to make the incredibly difficult decision to close this part of the Harewood experience".

== Gallery ==
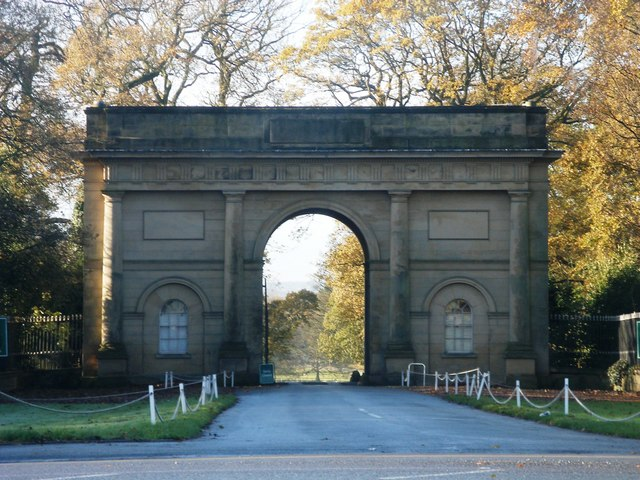
The main entrance to the Park

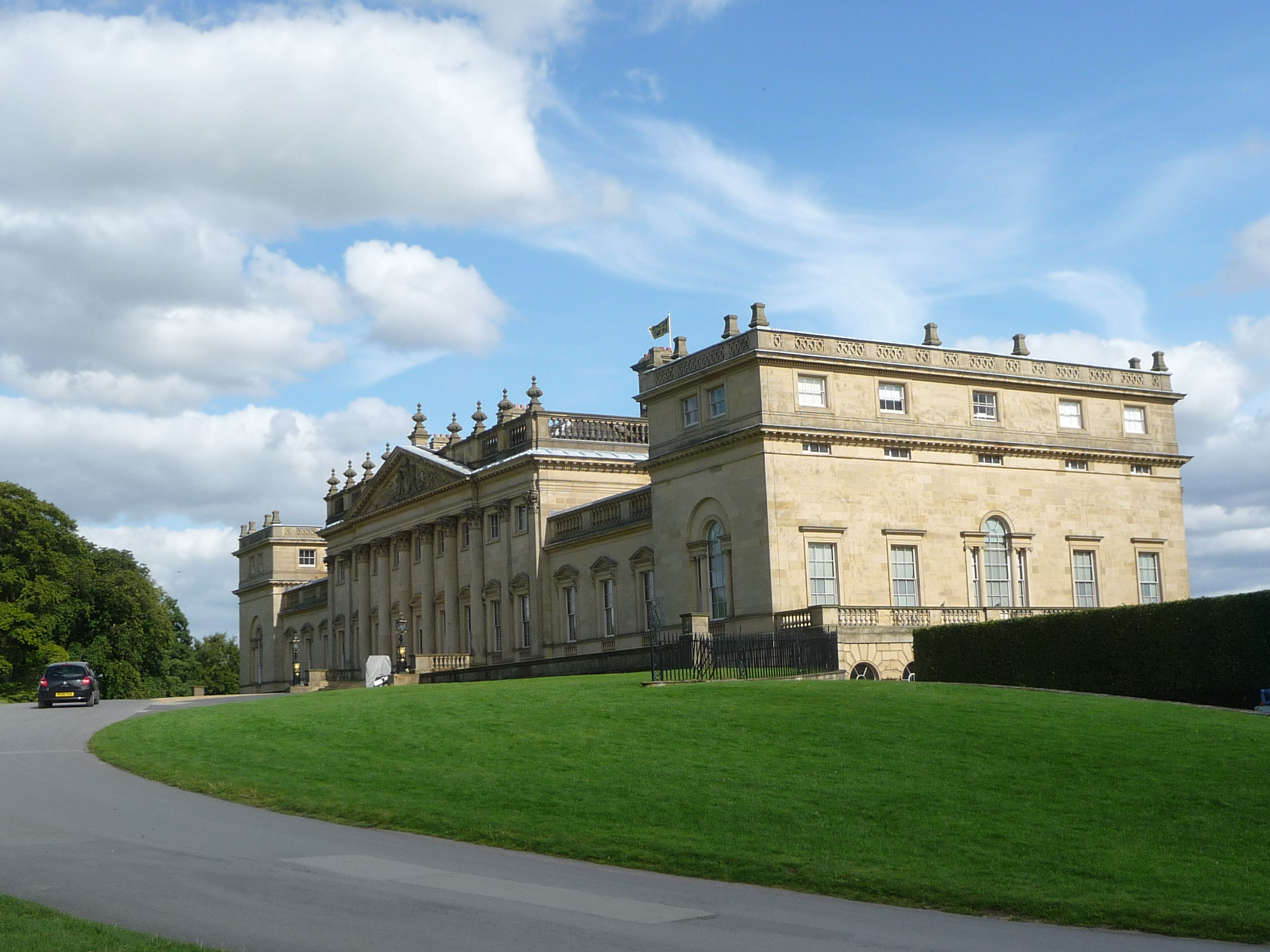
The entrance front

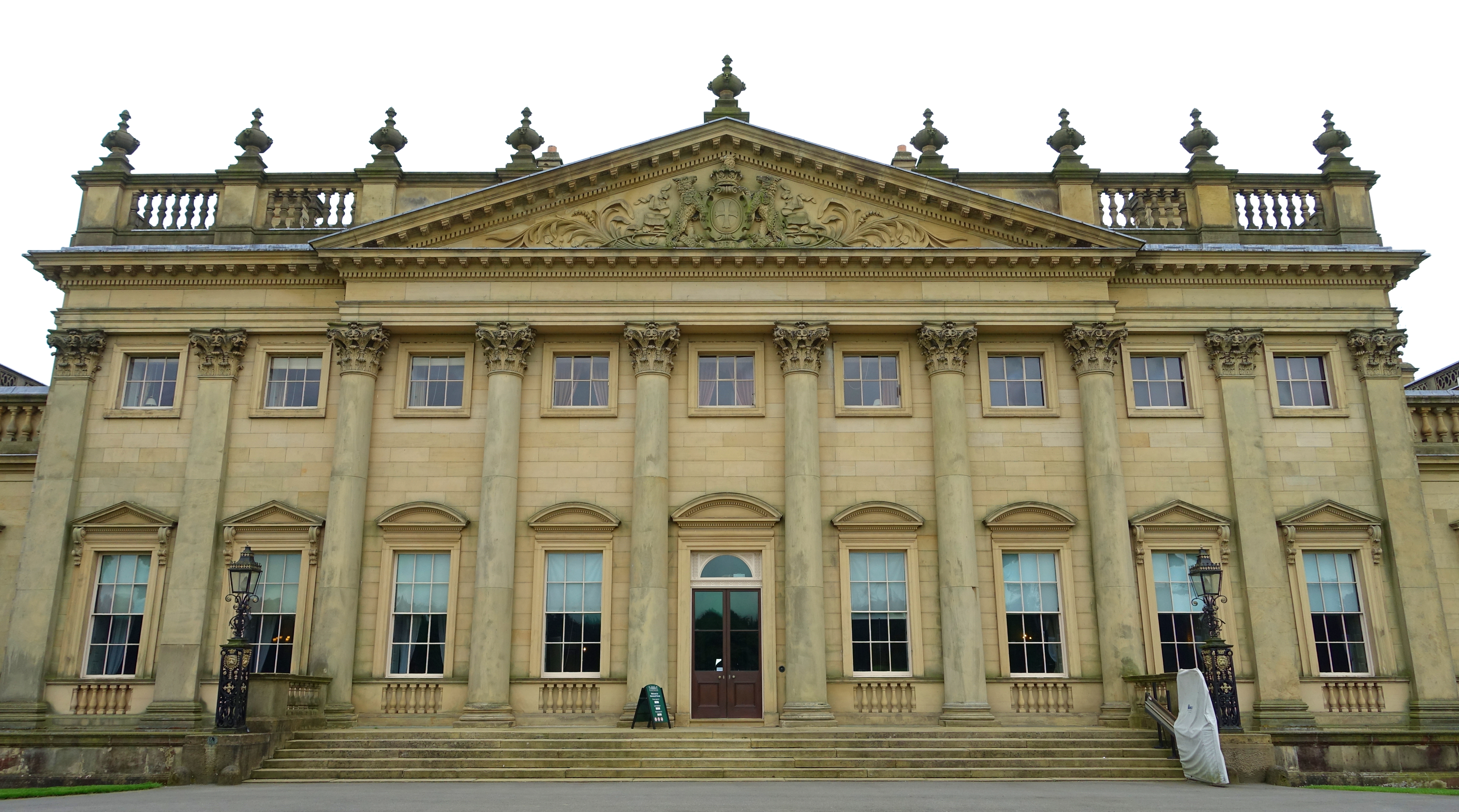
The centre of the entrance front

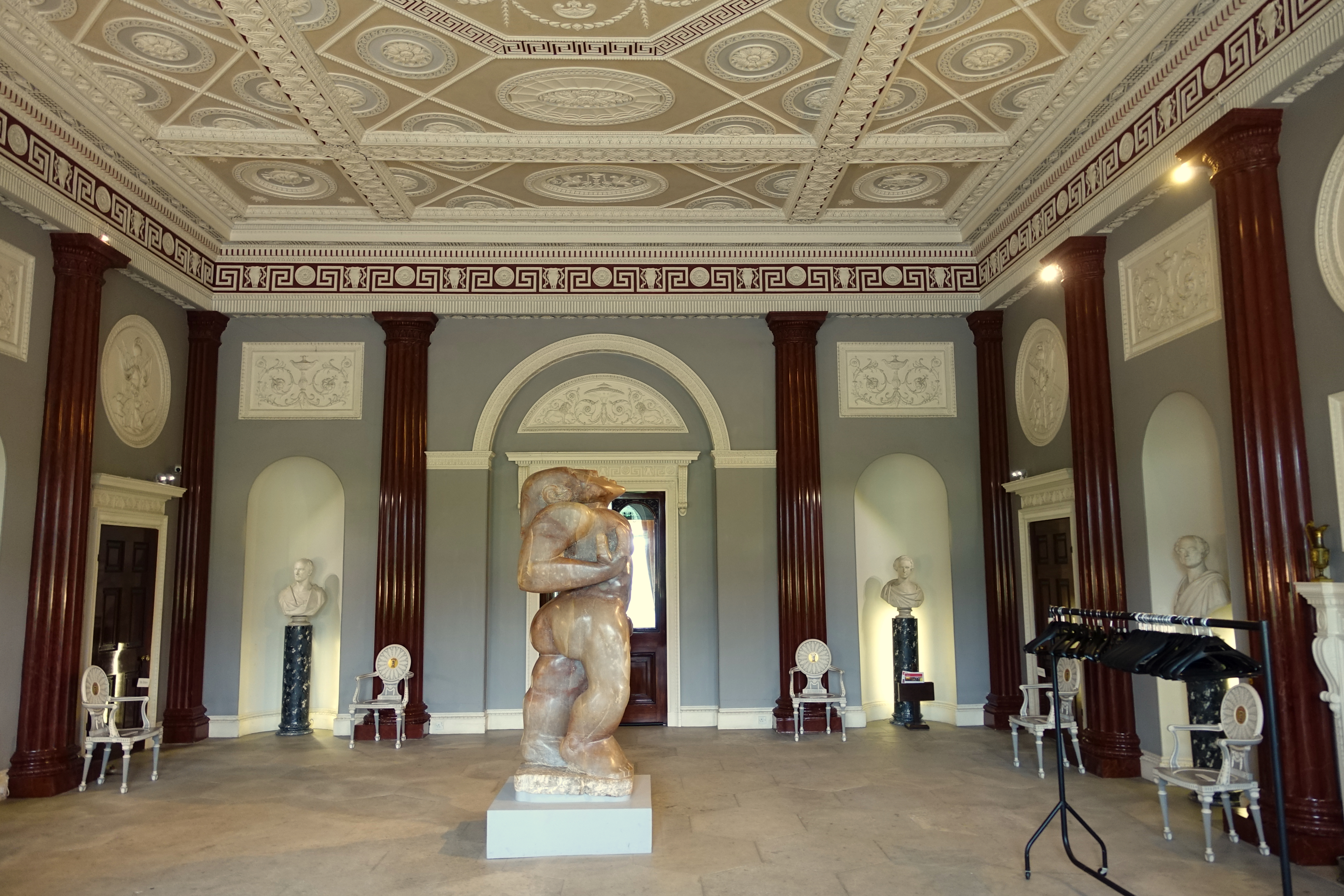
The Entrance Hall

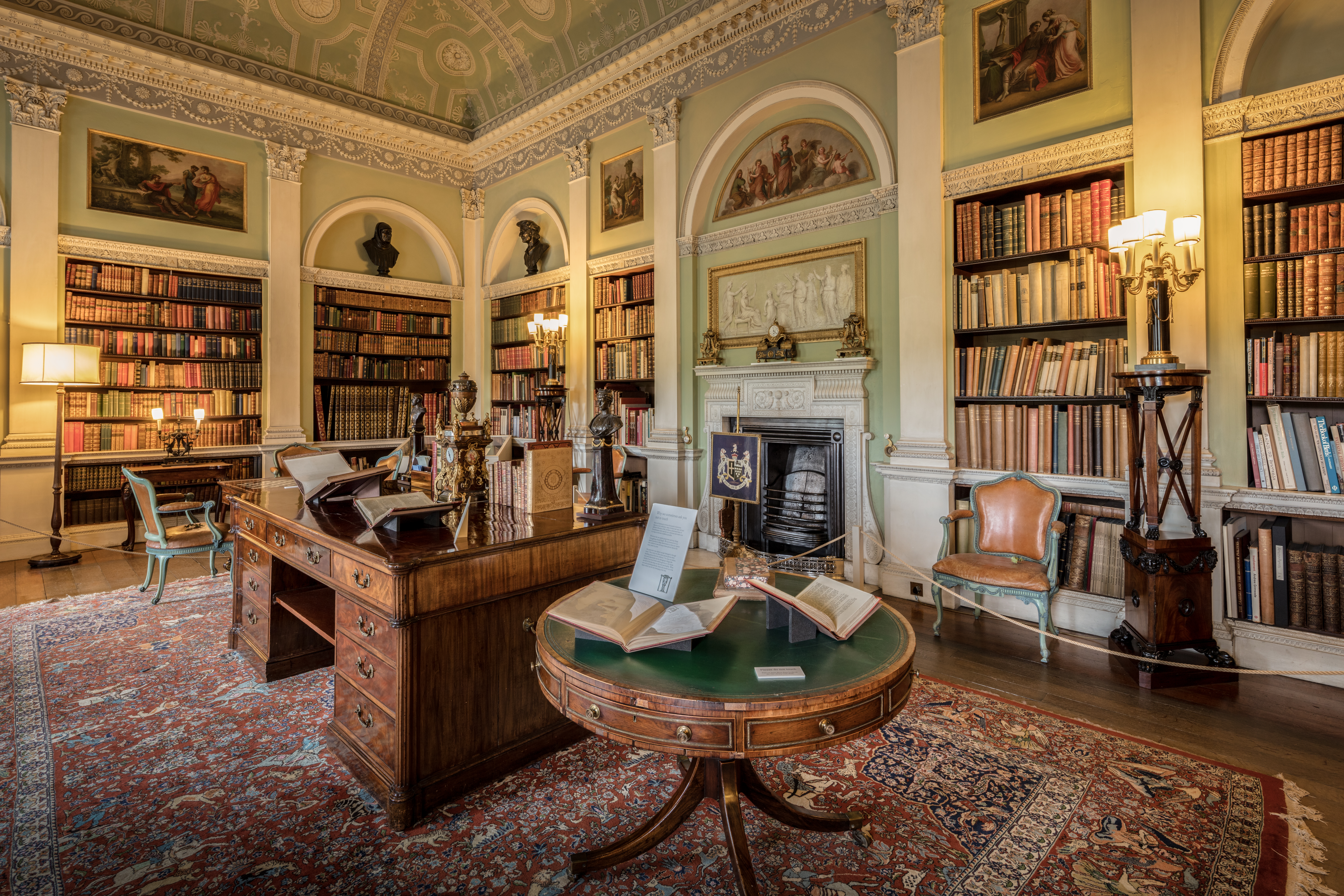
The Old Library

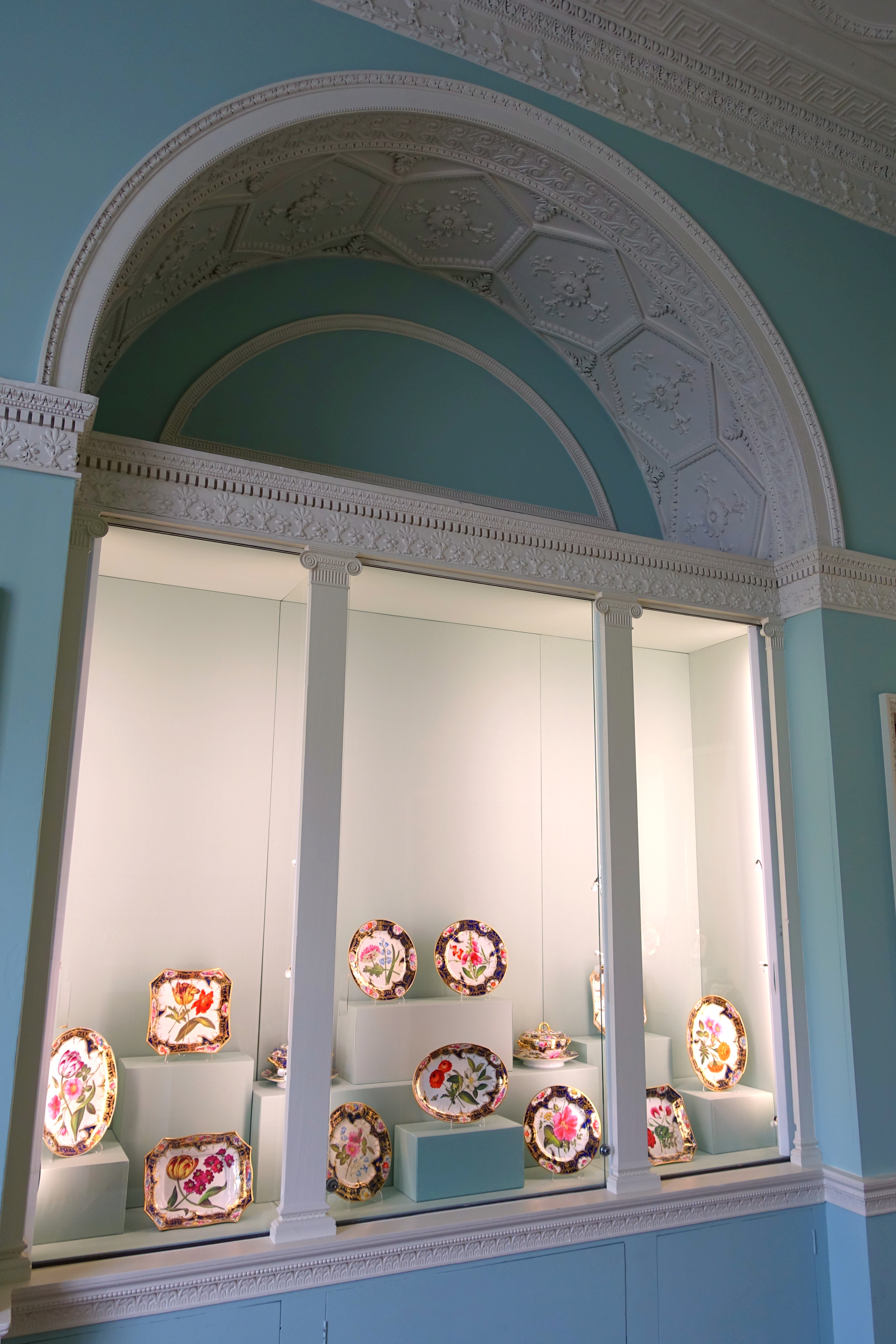
The China Room (Originally Study)

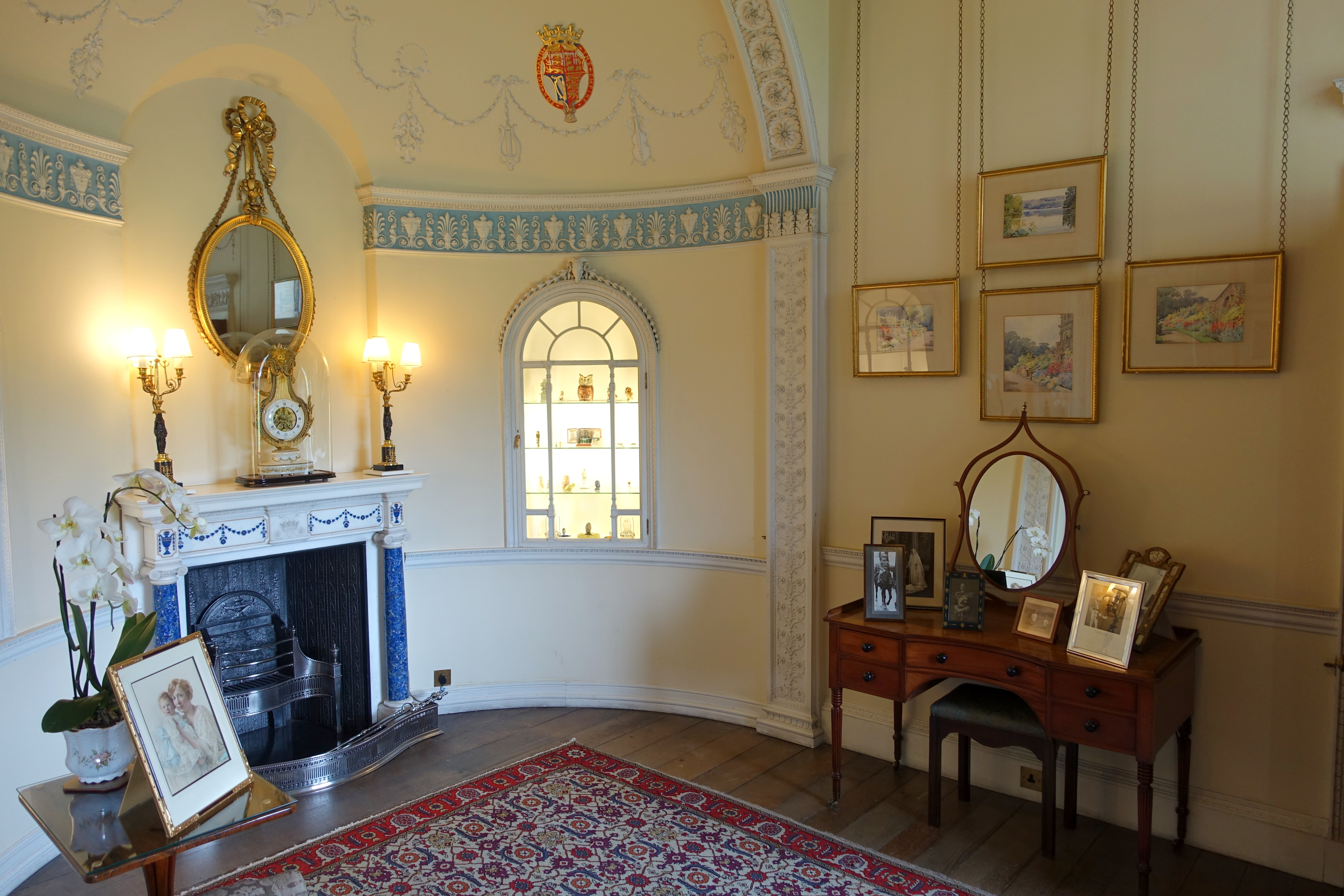
Princess Mary's Dressing Room

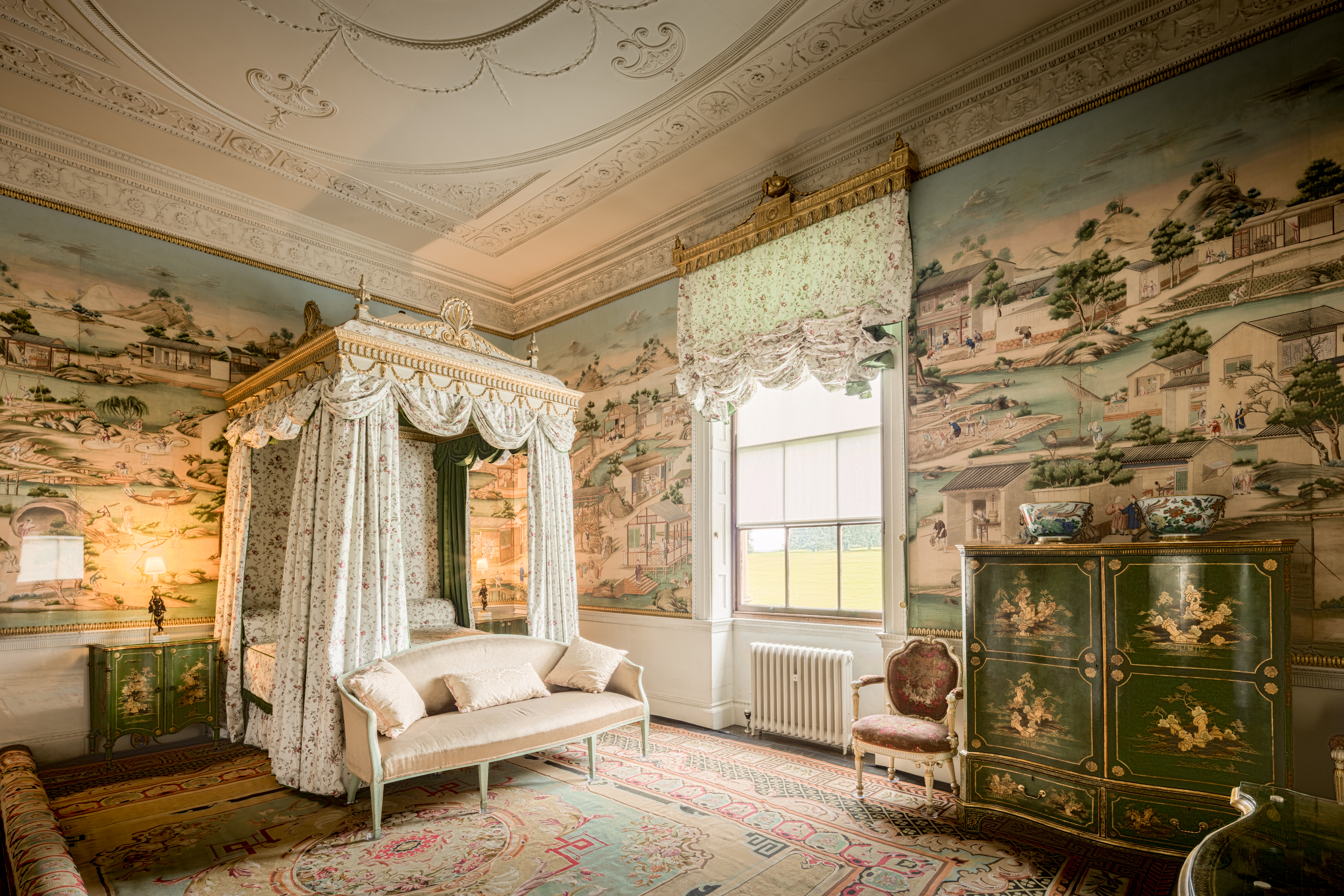
The East Bedroom

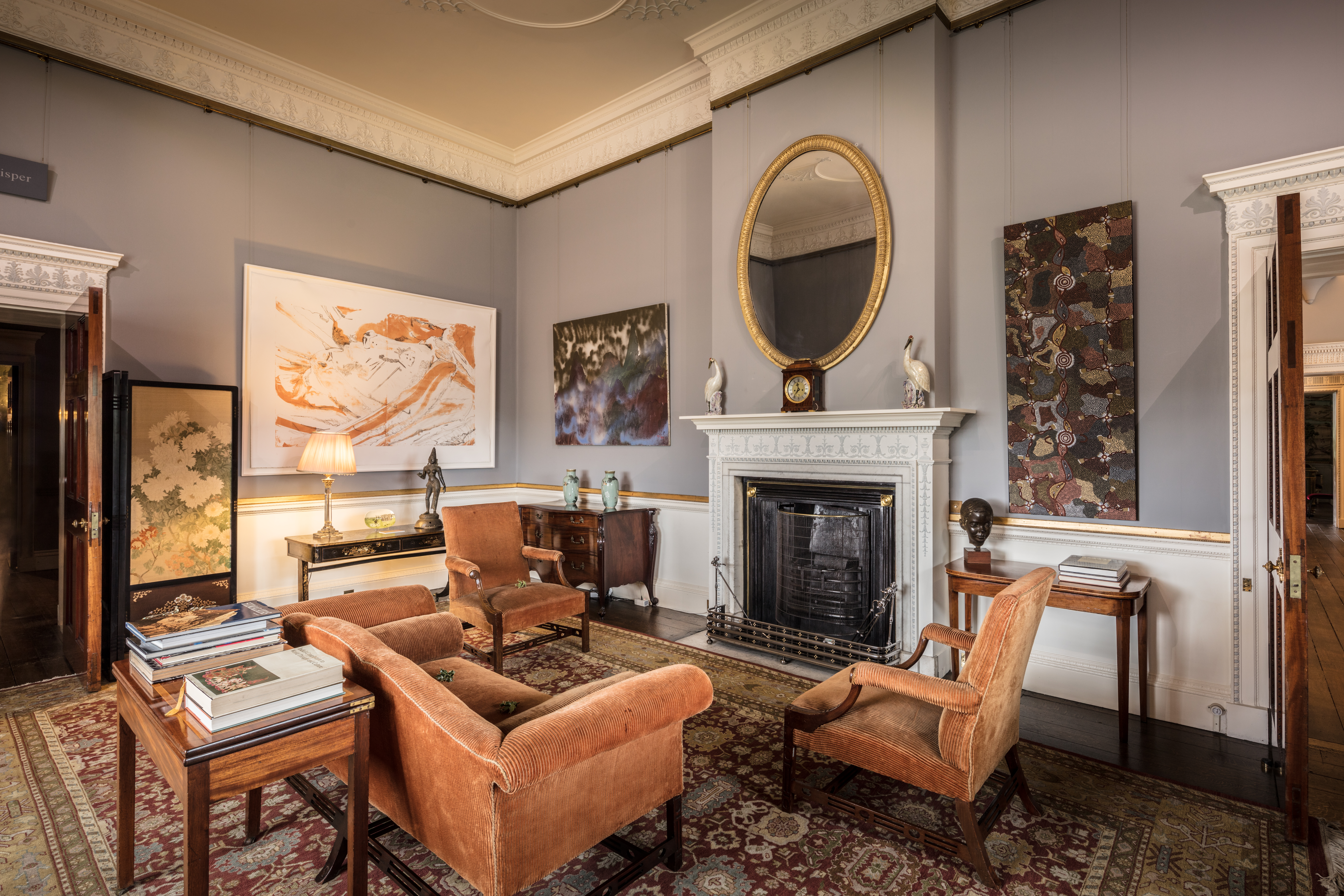
Lord Harewood's Sitting Room

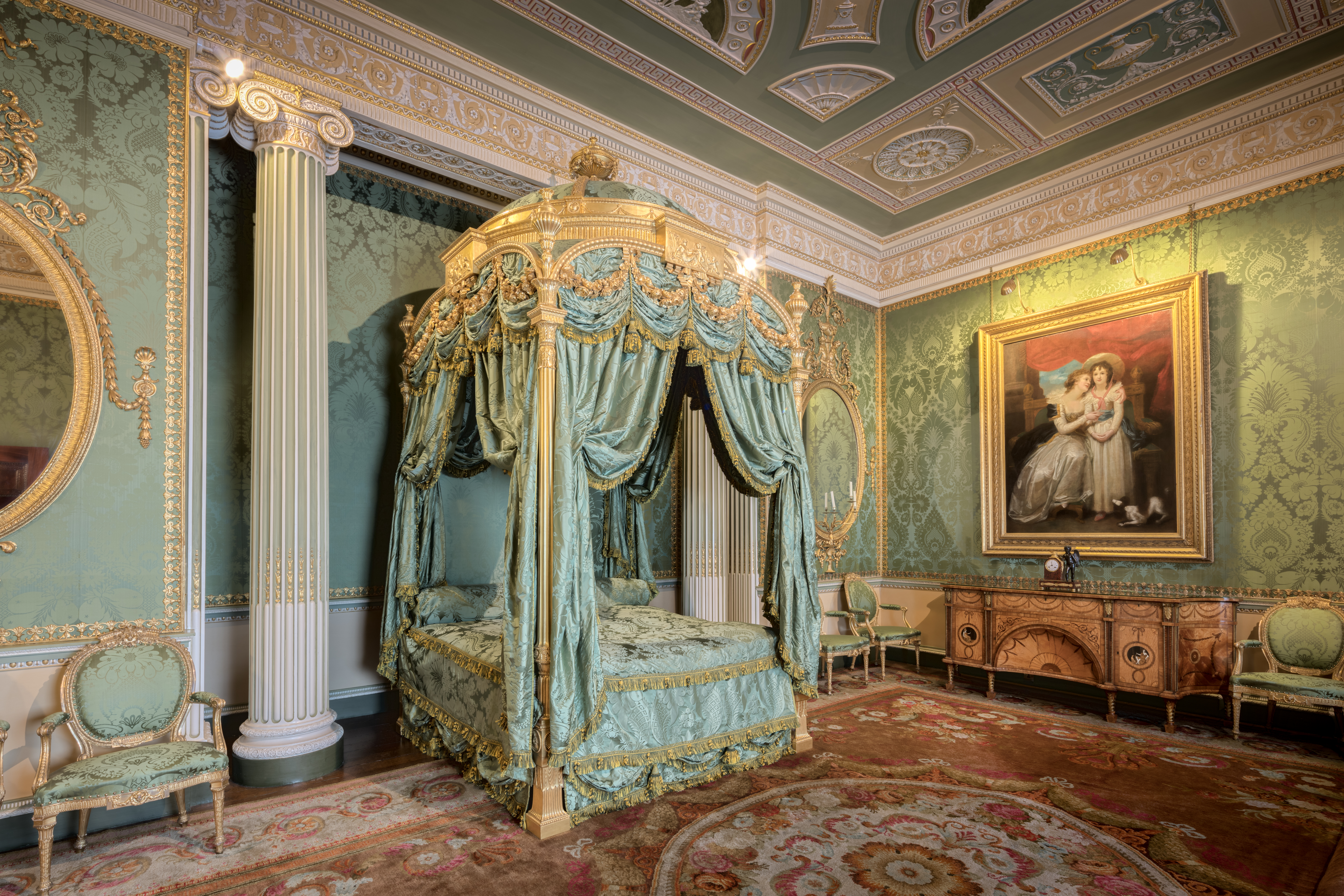
The State Bedroom

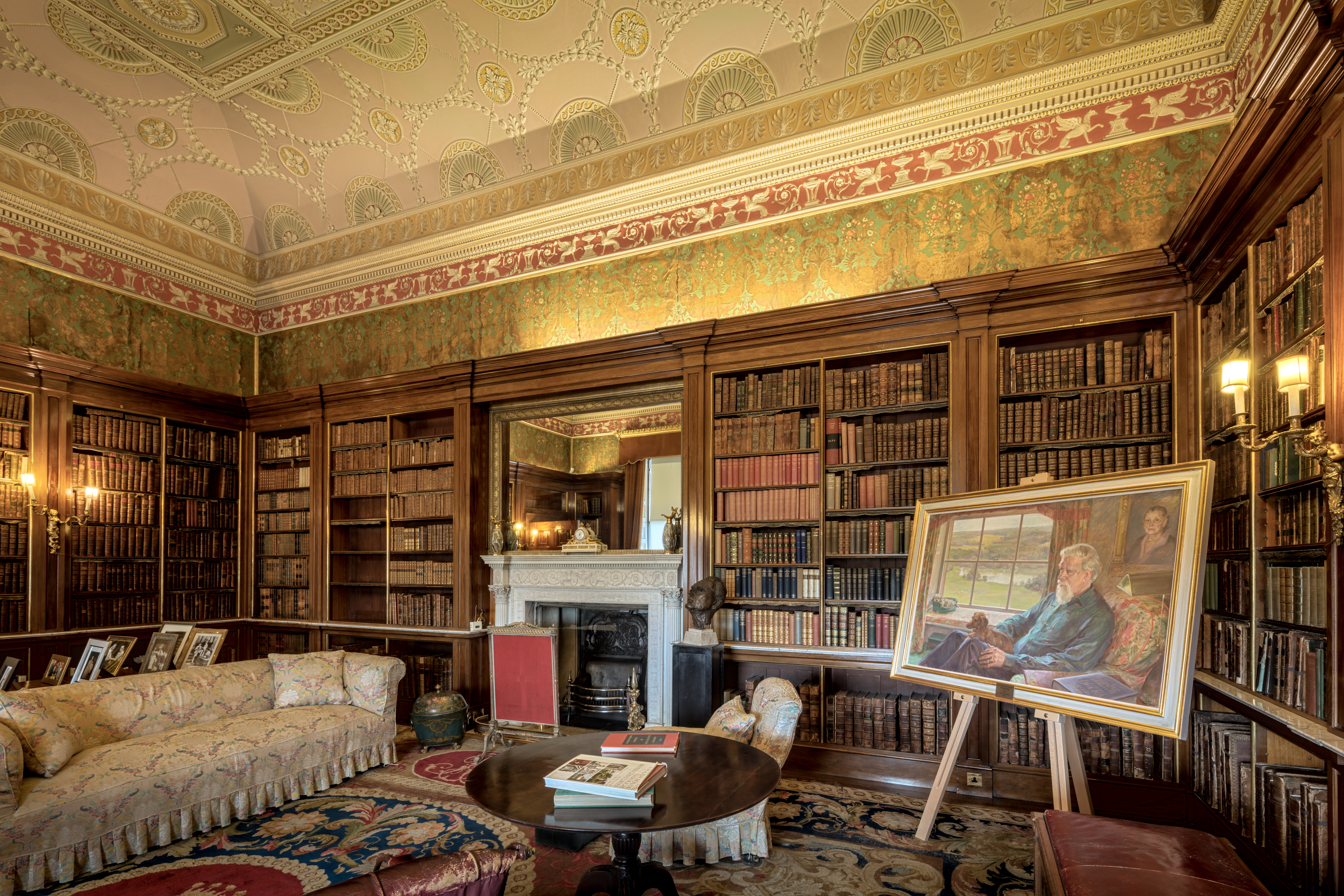
The Spanish Library

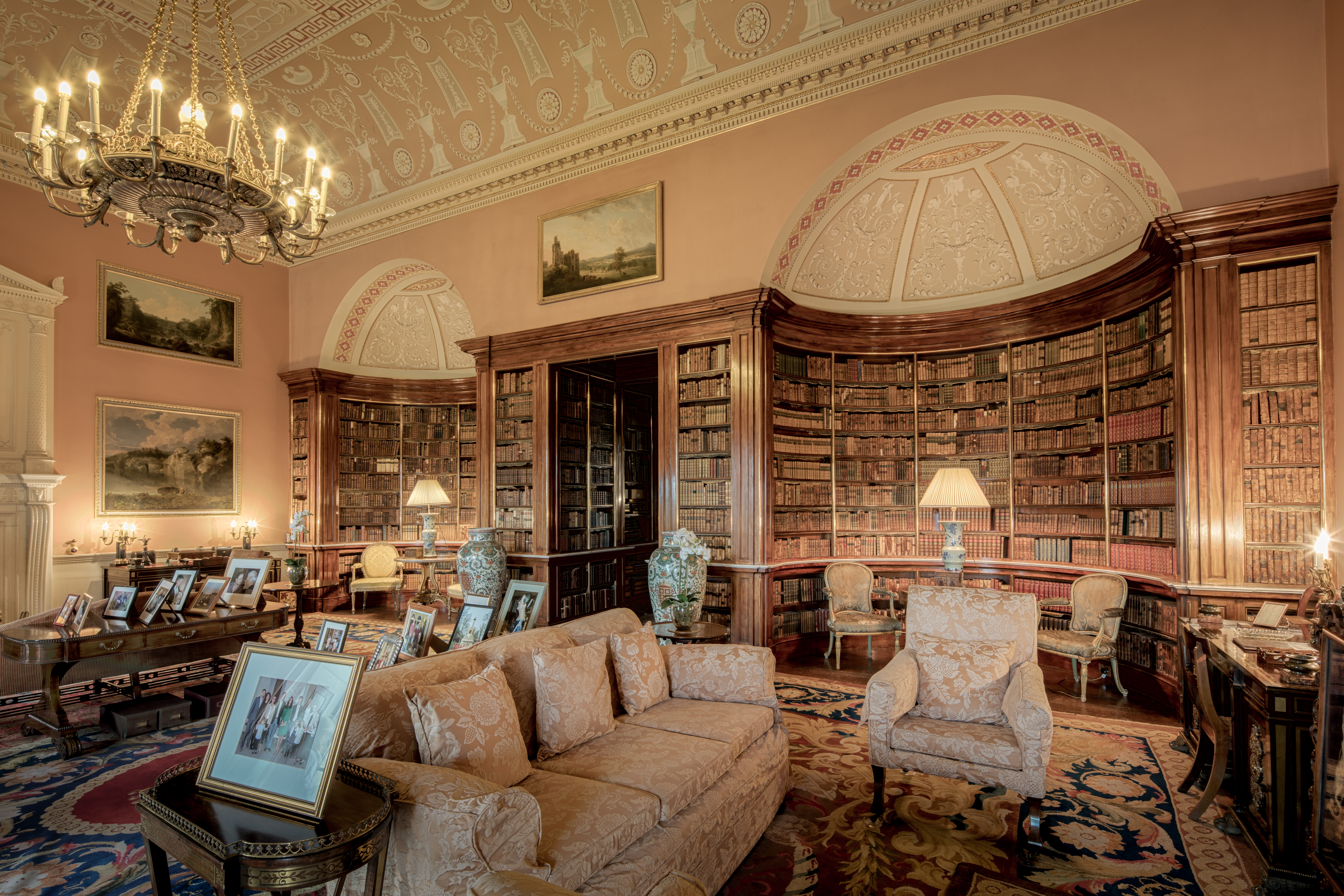
The Library

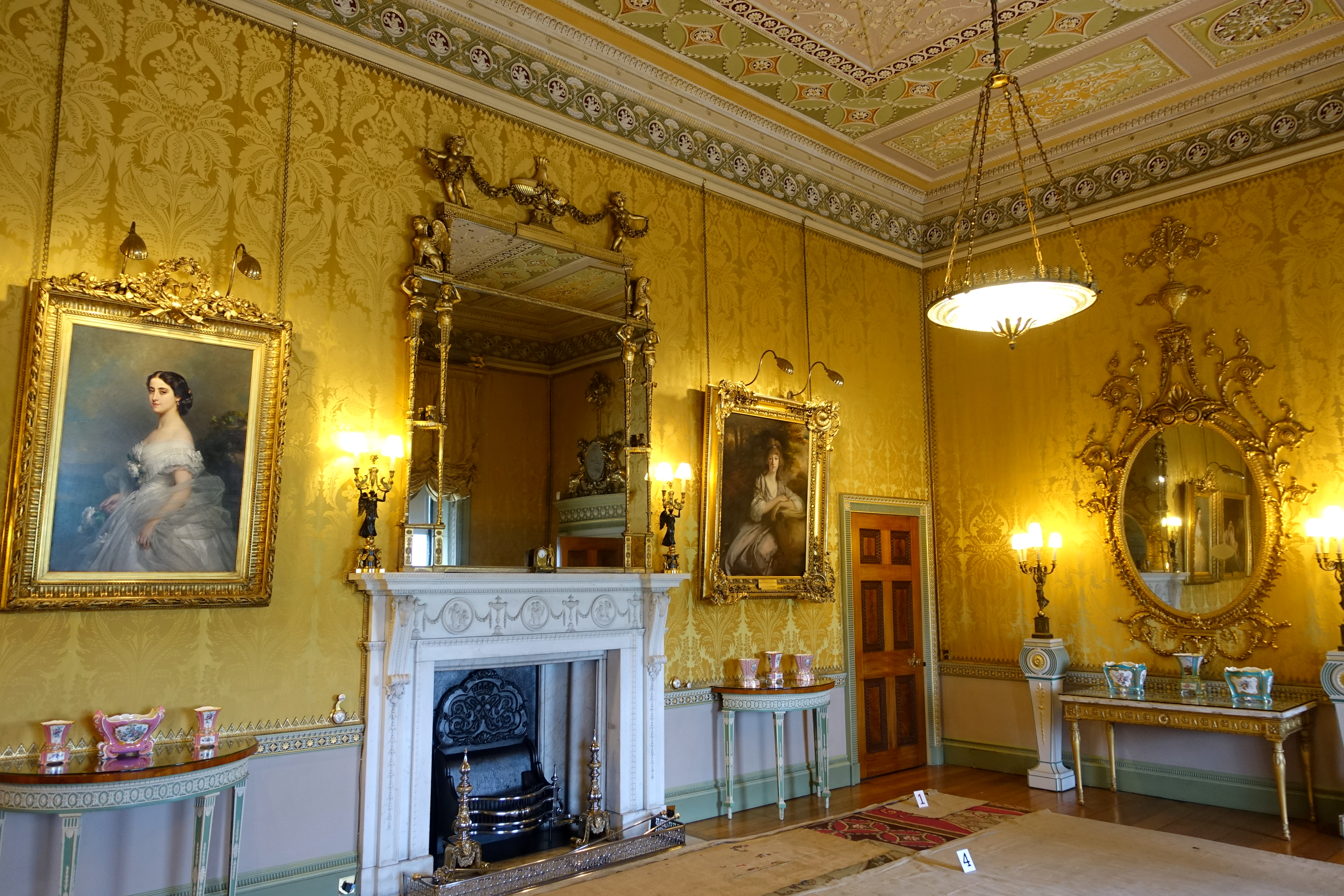
The Yellow Drawing Room

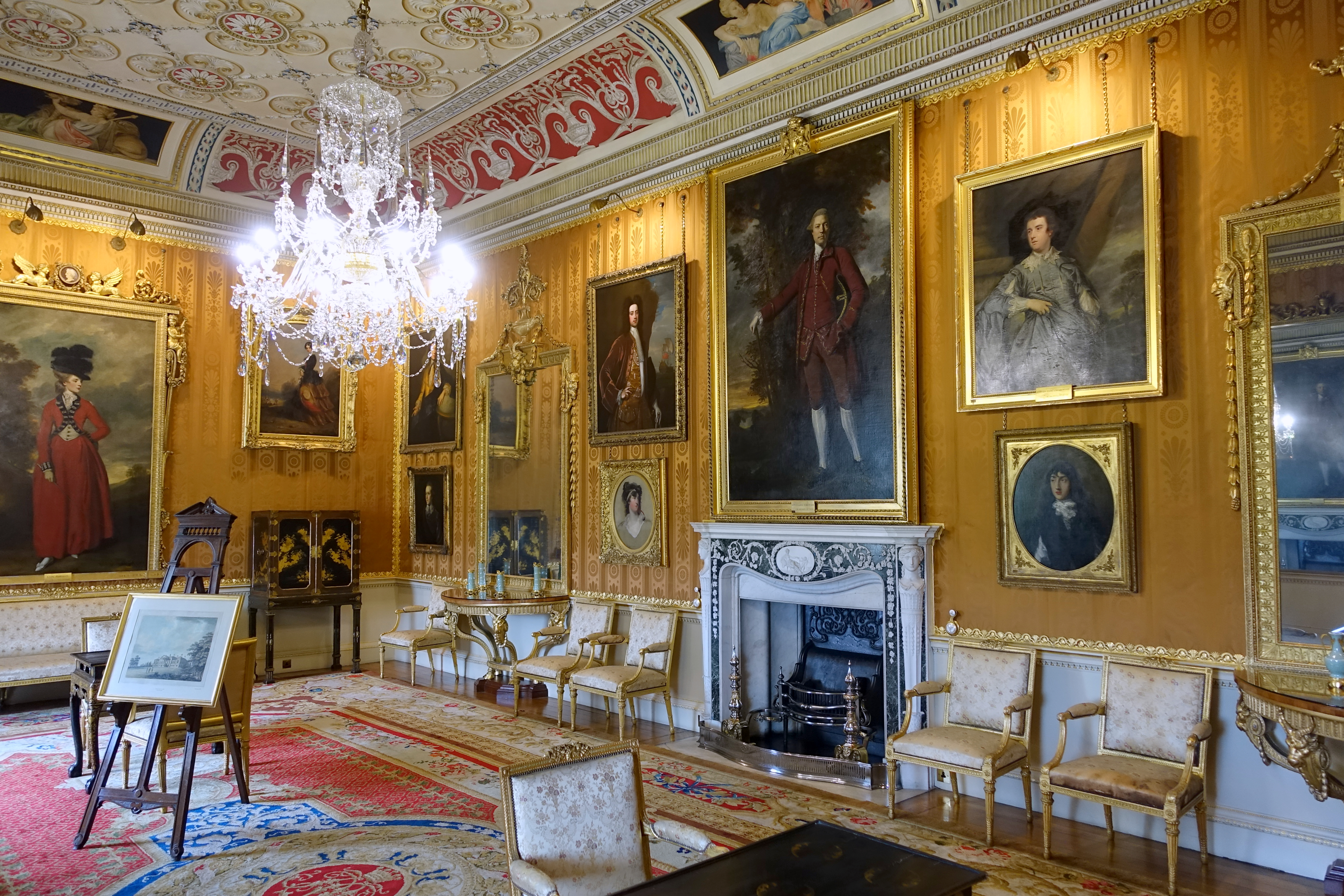
The Cinnamon Drawing Room

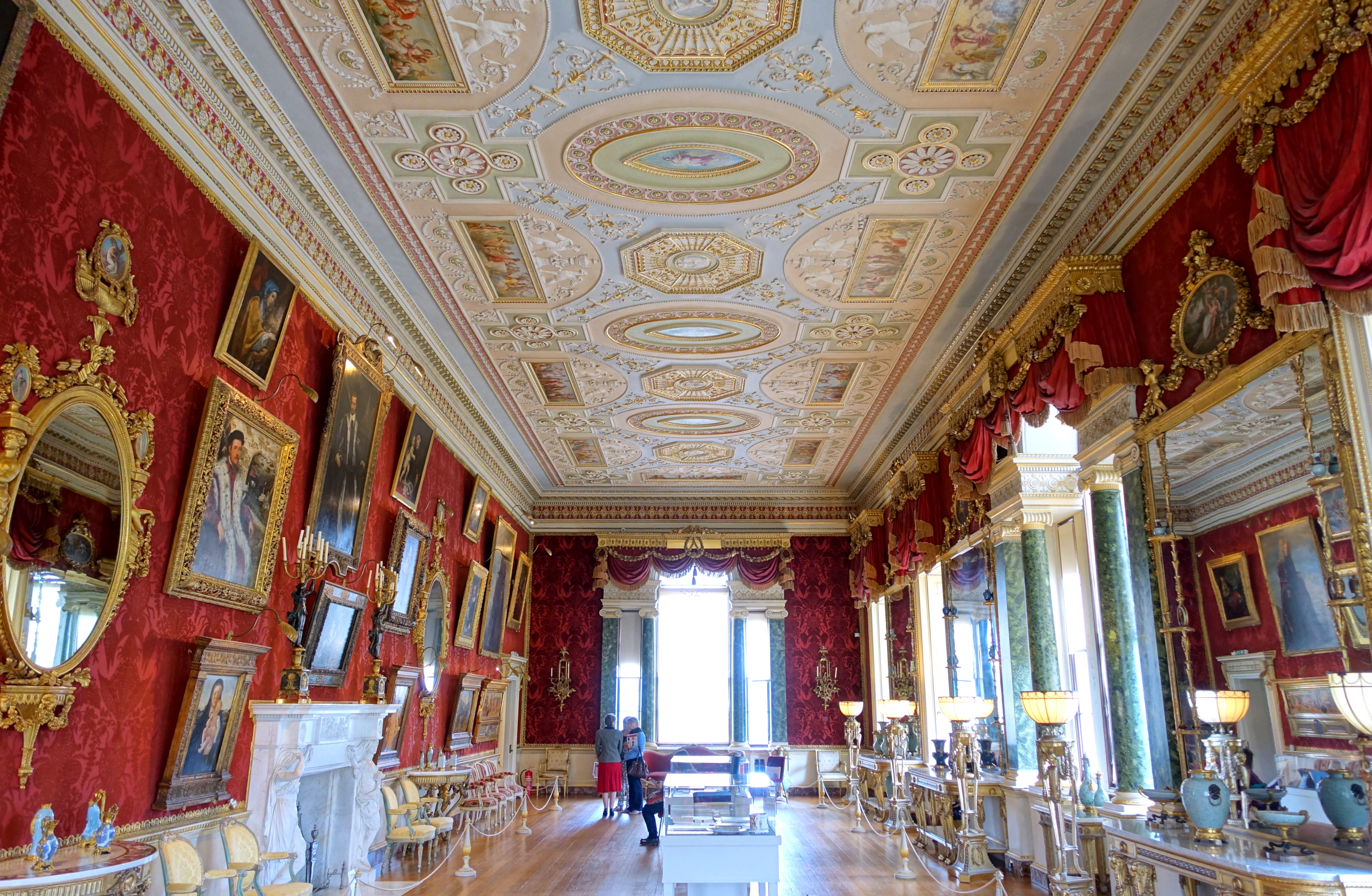
The Gallery

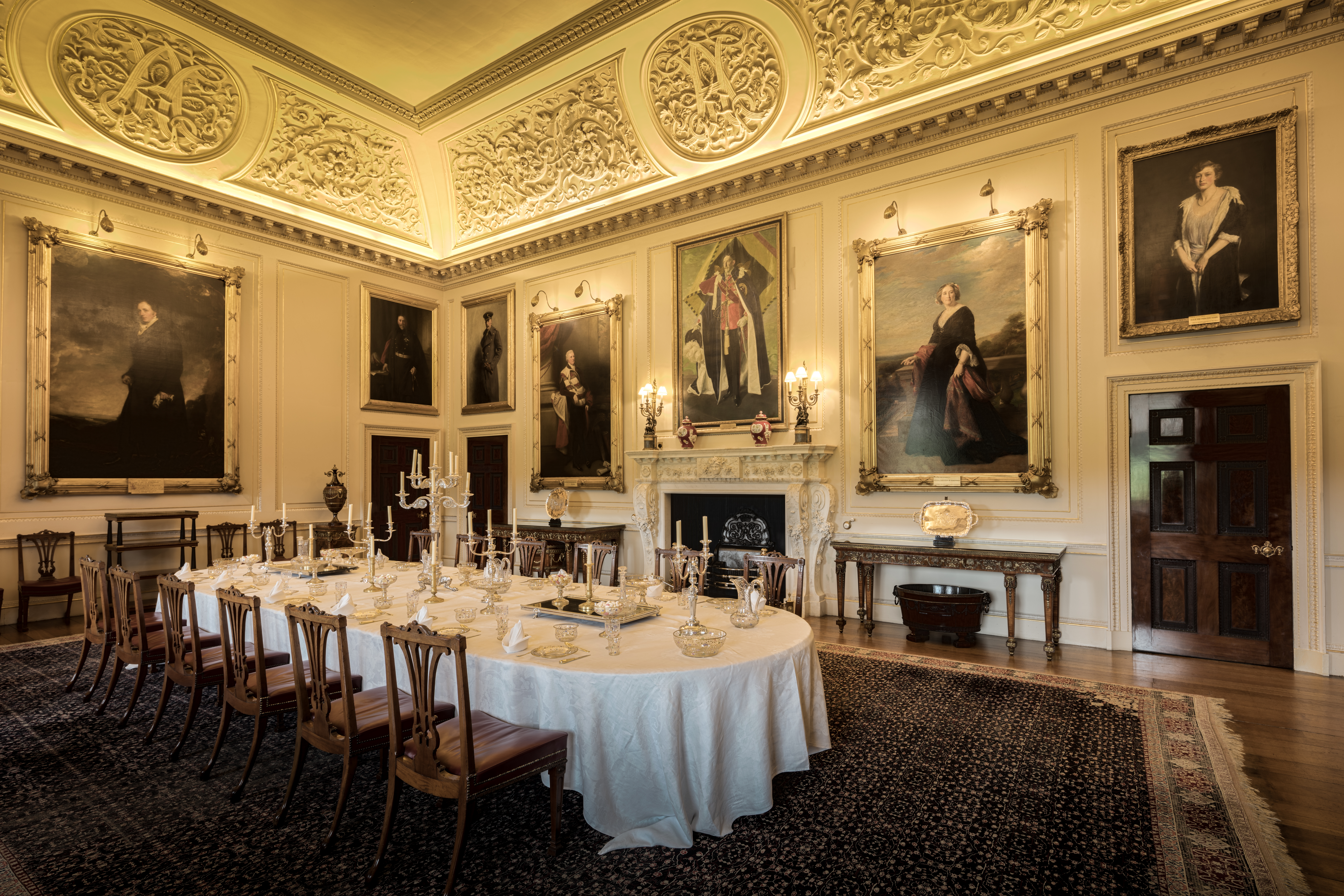
The Dining Room

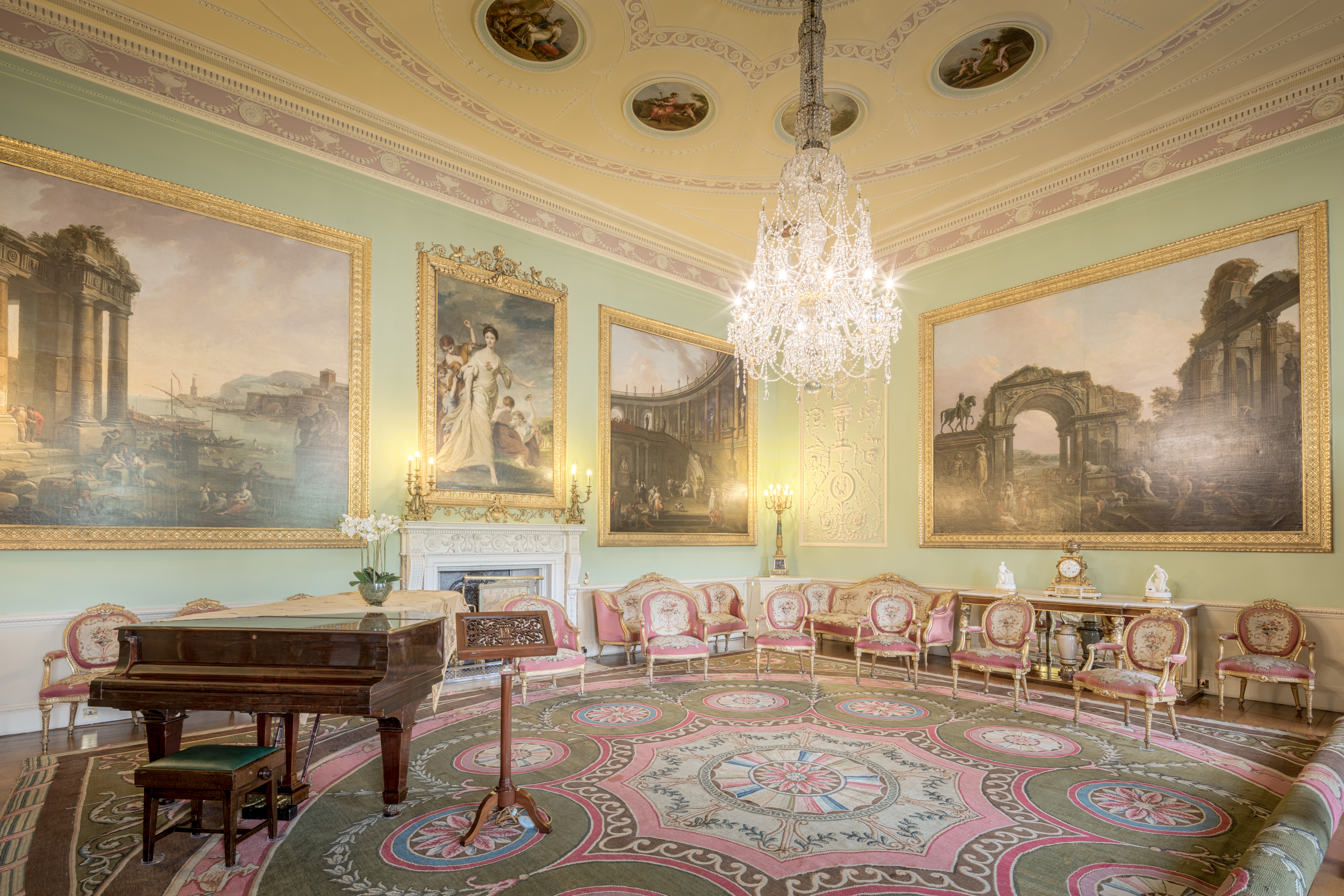
The Music Room

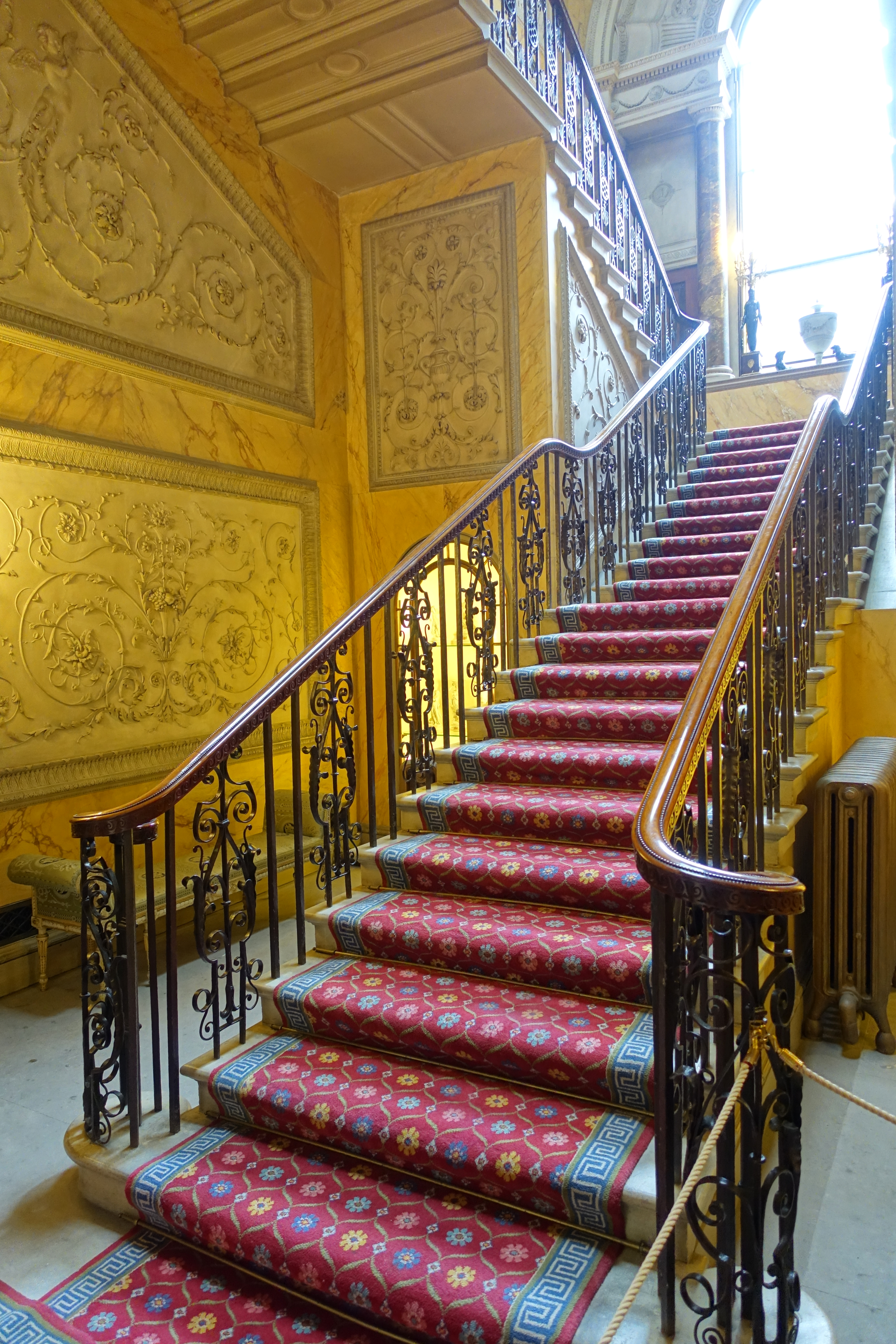
The Main Staircase

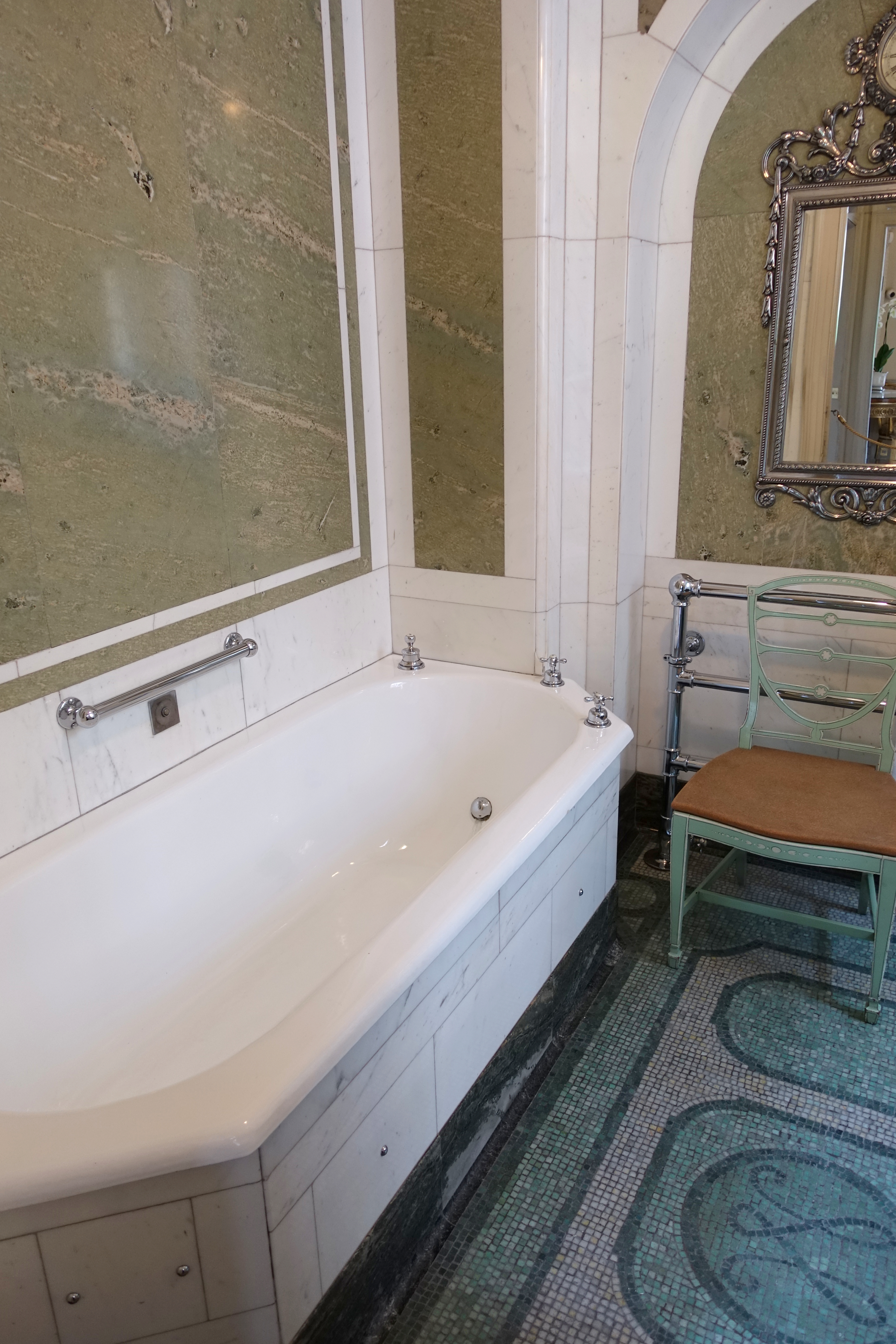
A bathroom

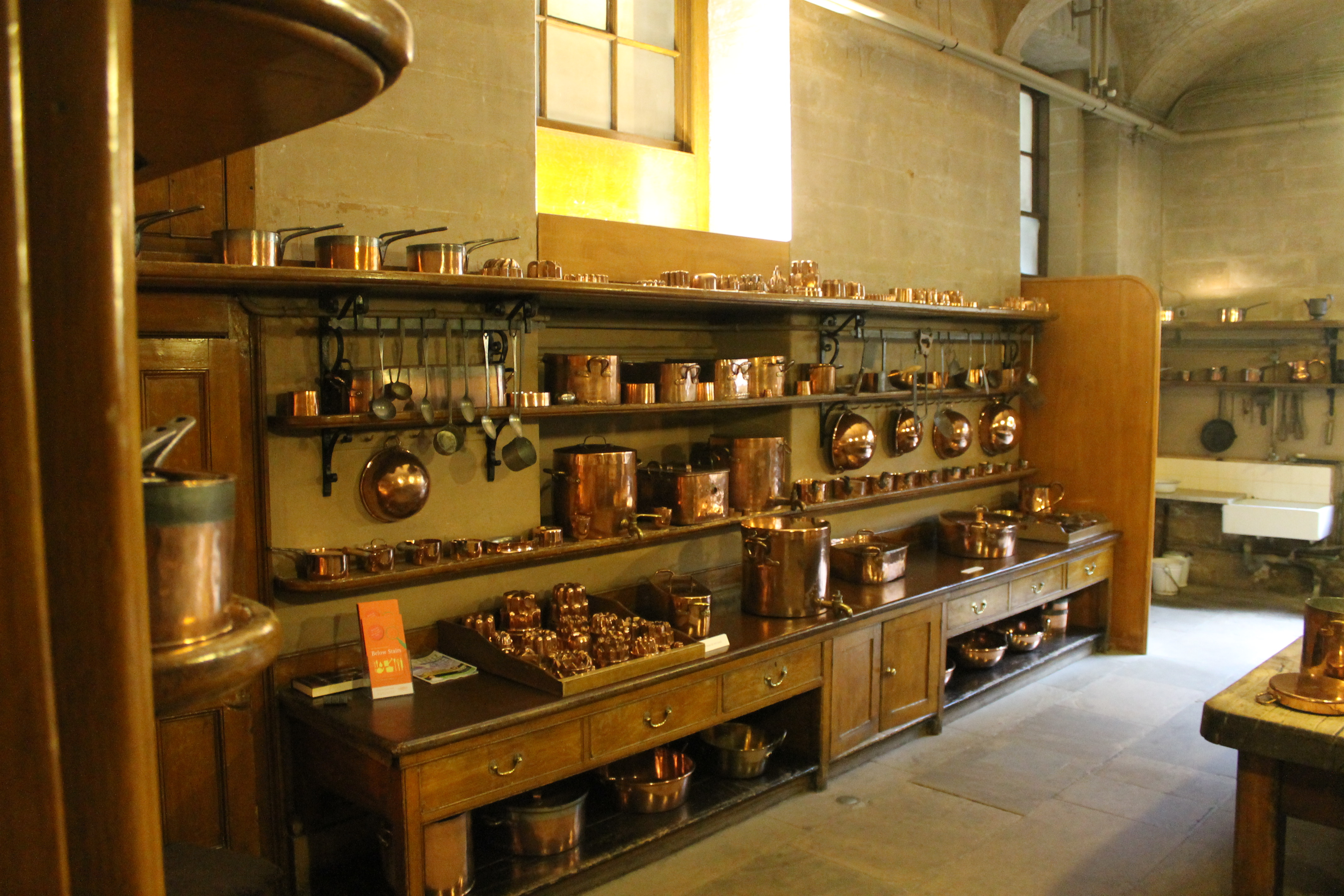
The Kitchen

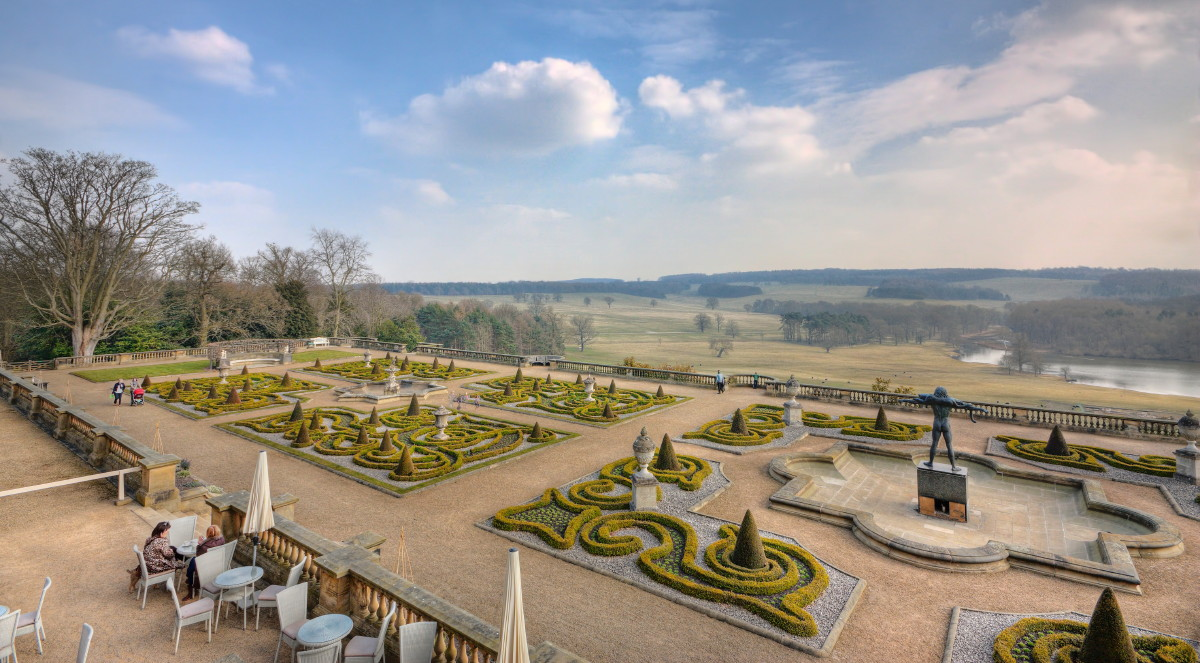
The terrace and parterre in front of the south façade

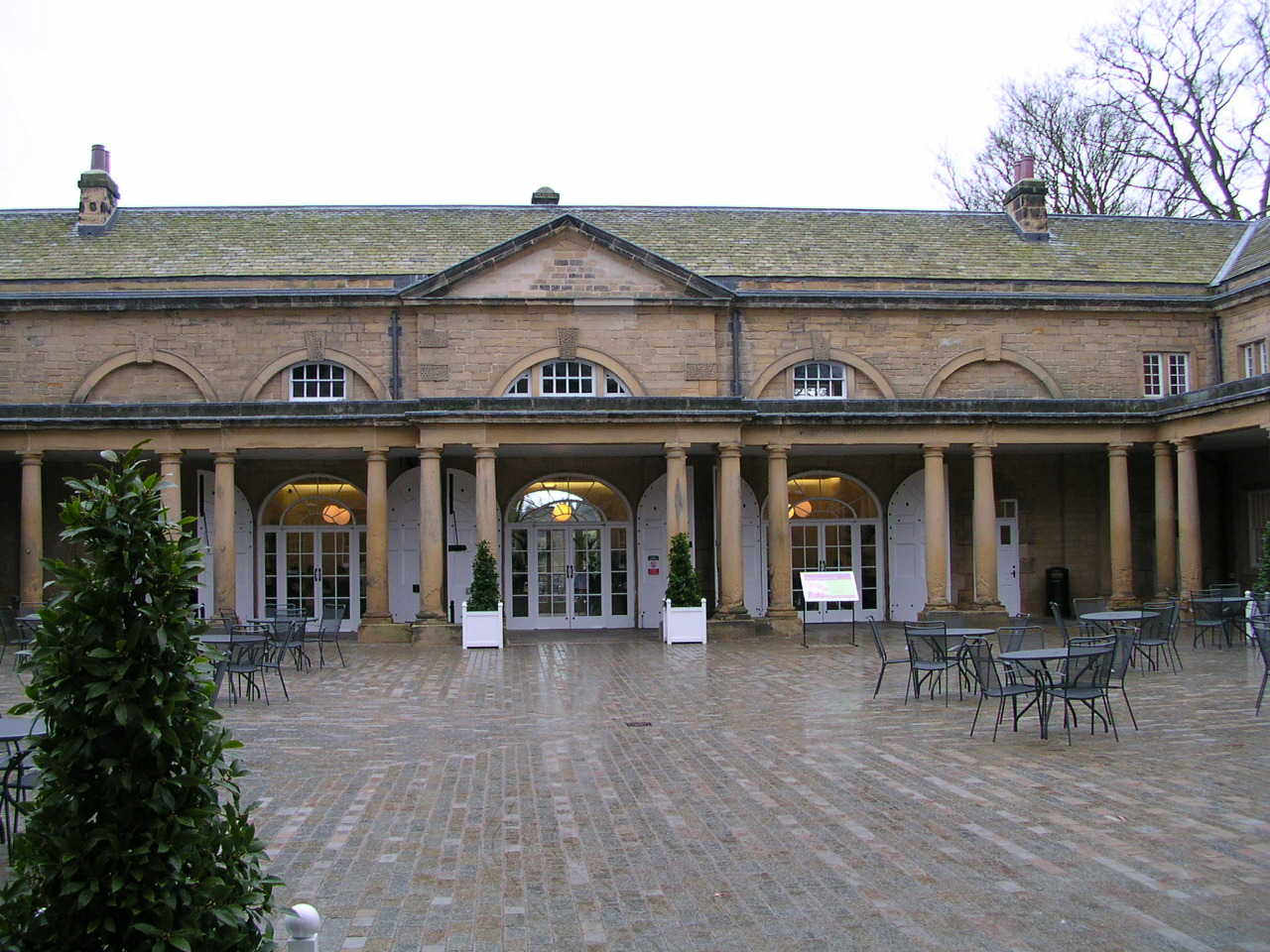
The Old Stables

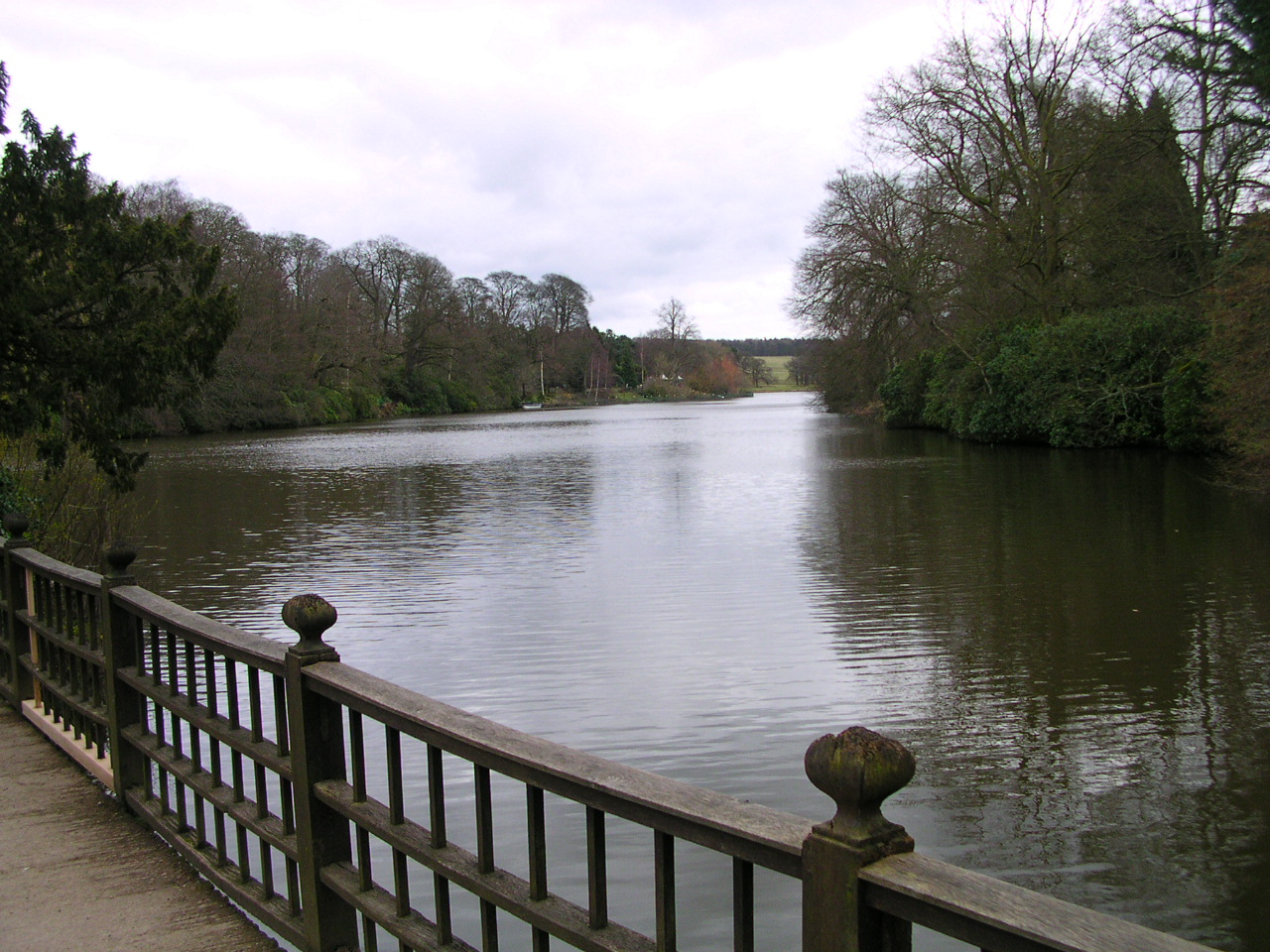
The lake

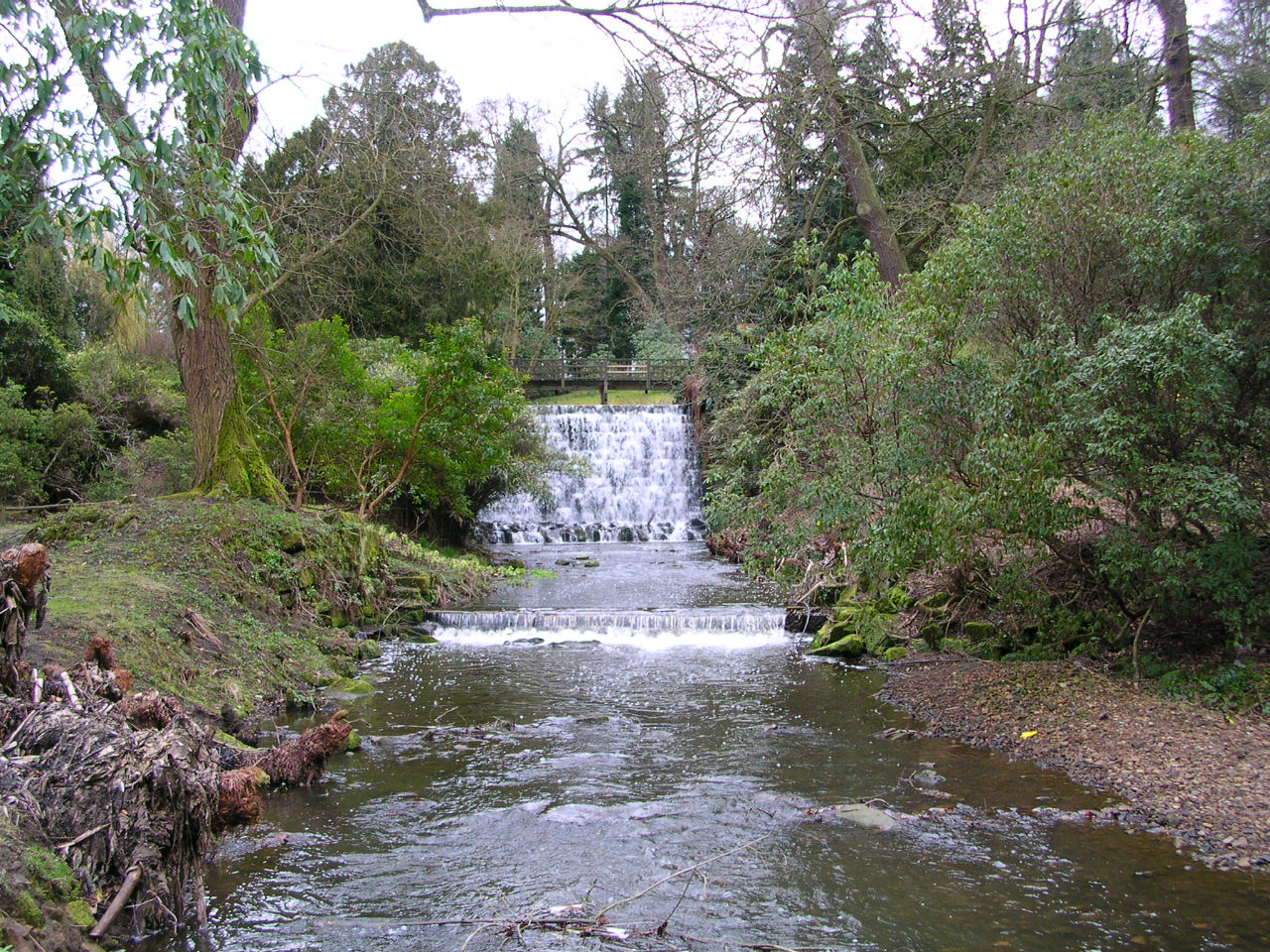
Harewood House cascade

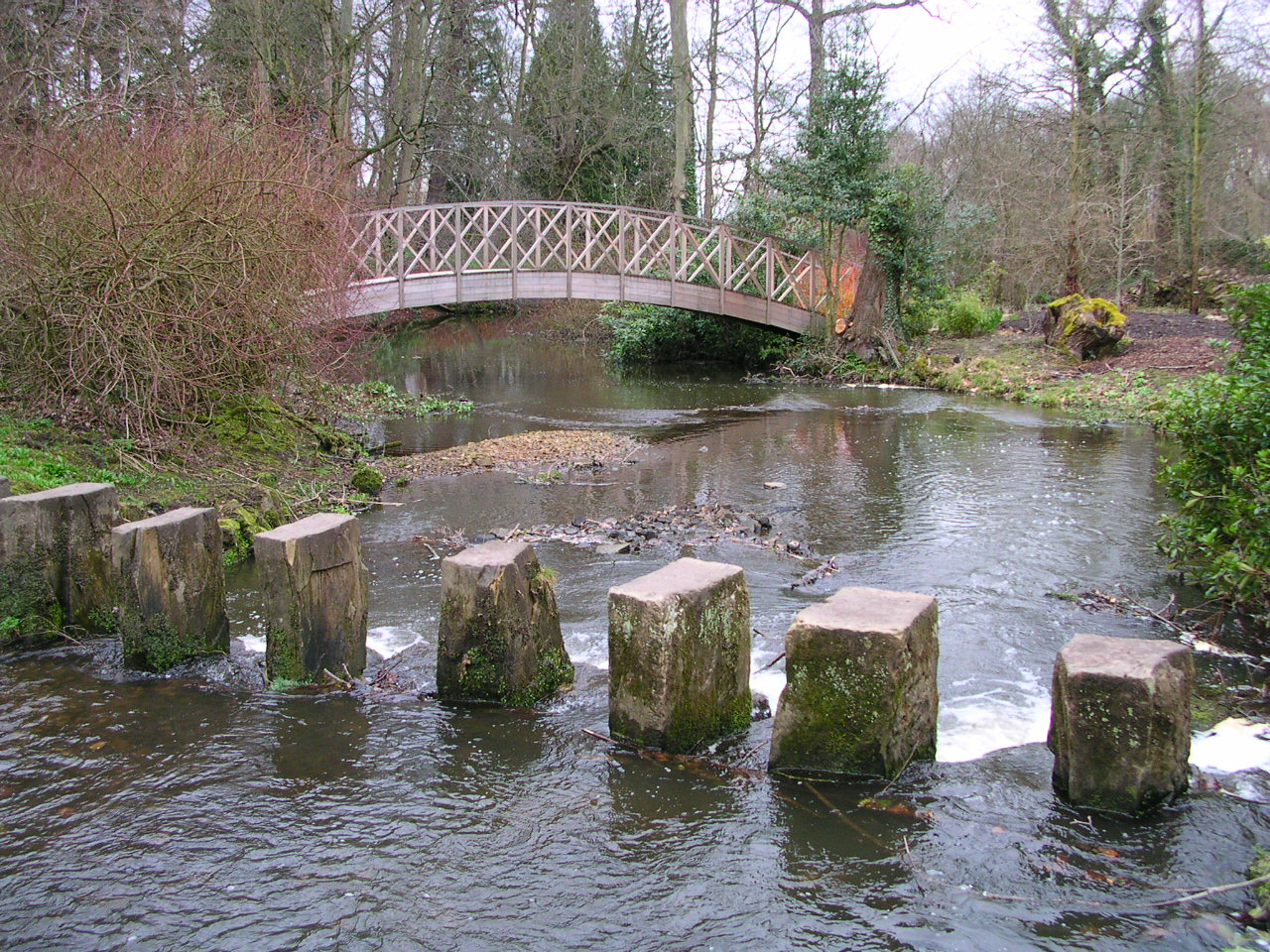
Stepping stones below the cascade

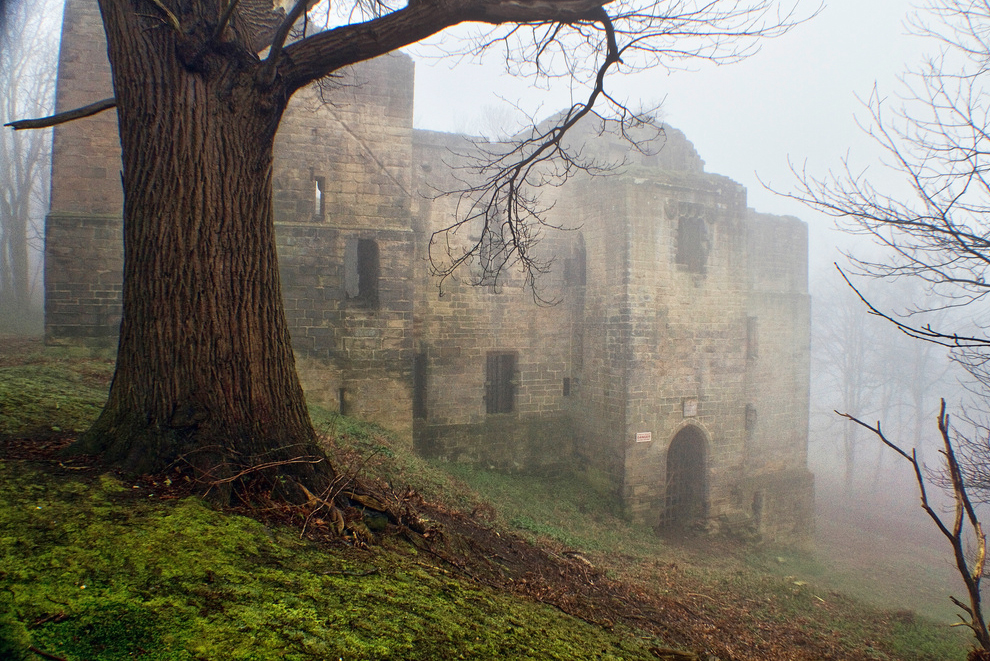
The recently preserved Harewood Castle, as seen from the northeast

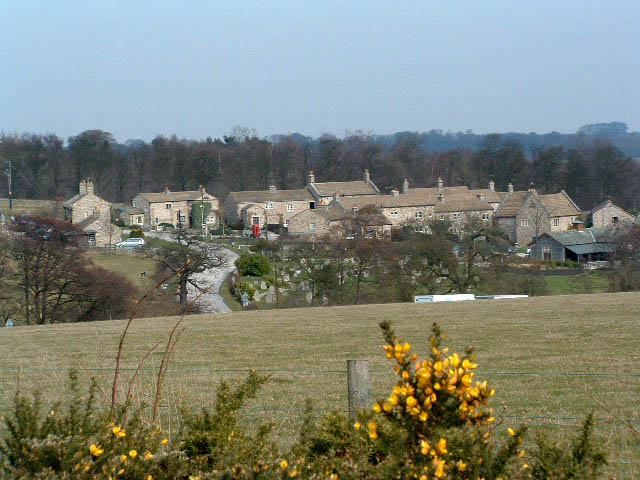
Exterior purpose-built village set built by ITV Studios in 1997, used for the production of Emmerdale since 1997.

== See also ==
- Grade I listed buildings in West Yorkshire
- Listed buildings in Harewood, West Yorkshire
