= Renate Eggebrecht =

German violinist (1944 - 2023)

Renate Eggebrecht (August 12, 1944 – January 8, 2023) was a German violinist and record producer.

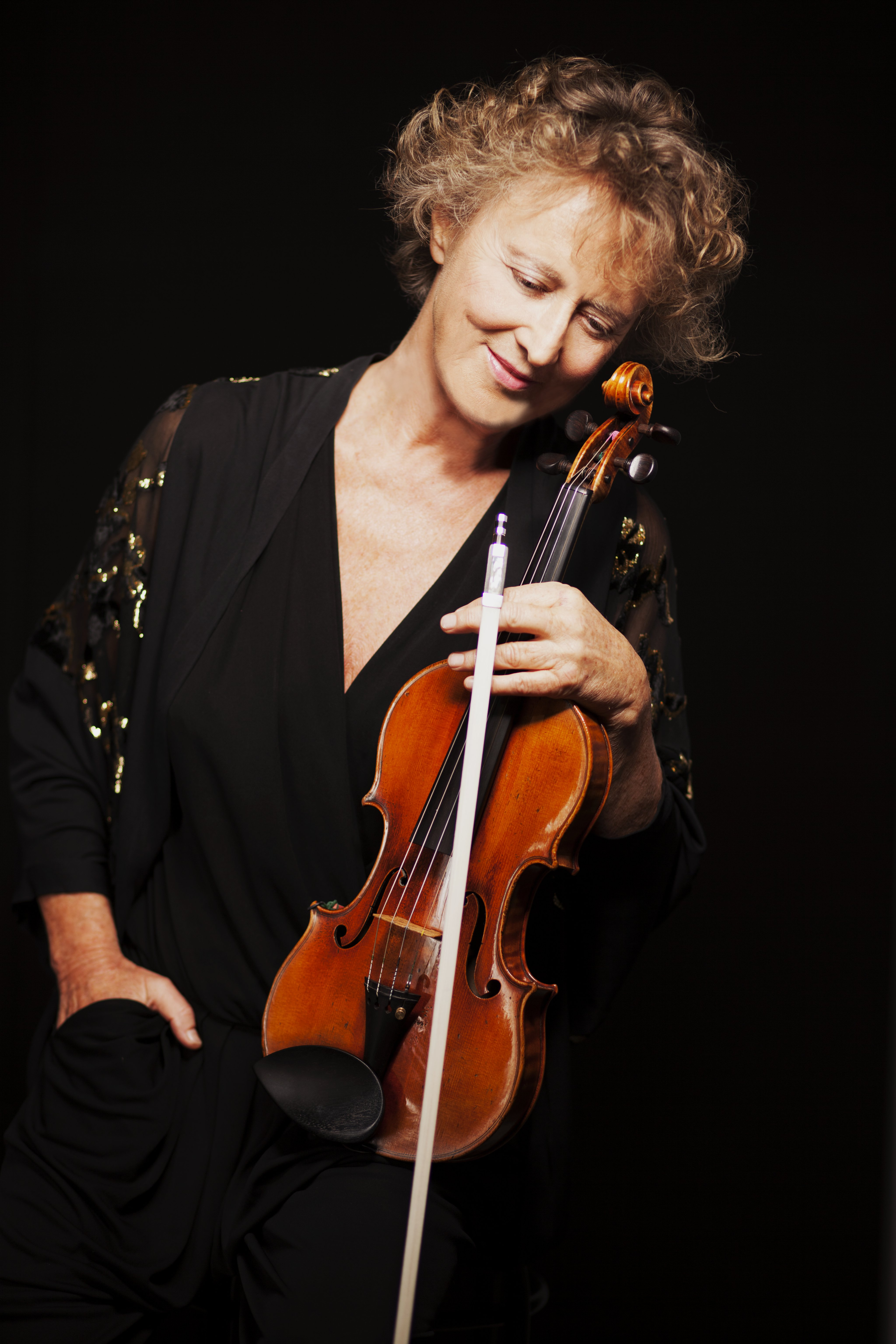
Renate Eggebrecht

== Music training ==
Born in Selent, Schleswig-Holstein, Eggebrecht received her first music lessons from her mother, before she was four years old. At the age of eight, she became a pupil of Hans Hilf, who had studied in the master class of Walther Davisson at the Leipzig Conservatory. From twelve years of age, Eggebrecht studied violin with Friedrich Wührer, son of the pianist Friedrich Wührer, and piano with Wilhelm Rau at the Lübeck College of Music.

Eggebrech continued her training at the Munich College of Music. She then devoted herself to private studies with Prof. Wolfram König, attended master classes with Max Rostal, Seymion Snitkovsky as well as chamber music courses with the LaSalle Quartet.

== Biography ==
In 1986, Eggebrecht founded the Fanny Mendelssohn Quartet. On 6 March 1988, they performed the world premieres of Fanny Hensel's Piano Quartet in A-flat major (1822), and String Quartet in E-flat major (1834) in the Gasteig in Munich.

In 1988, Eggebrecht published the first editions of these chamber music works (Furore Verlag, Kassel).

To publicize unknown and forgotten music, Eggebrecht founded the music production firm Troubadisc in 1991, as a Classical music label. She recorded world premiere CDs of chamber music by Fanny Hensel née Mendelssohn, Ethel Smyth, Germaine Tailleferre, Grażyna Bacewicz, and other women composers.

In 1993, Eggebrecht produced the complete songs of the French composer and pedagogue Nadia Boulanger, their first release on CD, and similarly the instrumental and piano songs of Ethel Smyth in 1997. Besides Hensel chamber music, Eggebrecht also produced the composer’s songs in 2001, and in 1998, with the pianist Wolfram Lorenzen, the piano cycle Das Jahr ("The Year") based on the composer’s fair copy as a CD world premiere.

With her ensemble, Eggebrecht recorded Darius Milhaud’s String Quartets Nos. 1 - 8 for CD in 1994-5, as well as his works Machine agricoles, Op. 56, and Catalogue de Fleurs, Op. 60. In 1996, she also released CD recordings by the Fanny Mendelssohn Quartet of the two string quartets by Arthur Bliss.

In 1997, together with the German pianist Wolfram Lorenzen, Eggebrecht published three volumes of CD recordings of Max Reger’s Piano Chamber Music. She subsequently recorded Reger’s complete works for violin which she completed in 2003.

In 2000, she issued, together with the cellist Friedemann Kupsa, the world premiere recording of the 1947 Violin Sonata by Nikos Skalkottas, and the Sonatina, Op. 324, by Darius Milhaud. With Friedemann Kupsa, she presented, in 2002, the world premiere of the 1985 Duo Sonata by the Romanian avant-garde composer Anatol Vieru and the Straßenmusik No 16, Op. 210 (2001) by Dimitri Nicolau.

She published Violin Solo in 2002, beginning with Reger's Chaconne, Op. 117, then Bach's Sei Solo and to the present day, as a compendium of the modern violin literature.

Eggebrecht's violin was a Stradivarius copy by Jean-Baptiste Vuillaume from 1858; her favorite bow was by Jules Fétique.

== Discography ==
TROUBADISC Musicproduction

- VIOLIN SOLO Vol.10, CD 2018: Einojuhani Rautavaara, Variétude (1974); Kalevi Aho, Solo I (Tumultos), Sonata per violino solo (1973); Pehr Henrik Nordgren, Sonata for violin solo op.104 (1999); Kalevi Aho, In Memoriam Pehr Henrik Nordgren (per violino solo) (2009);
- VIOLIN SOLO Vol.9, CD 2017: Mieczysław Weinberg, Sonata No. 1 op.82 (1964), Sonata No. 2 op.95 (1967), Sonata No. 3 op.126 (1979); Alfred Schnittke, Fugue for violin solo (1953);
- VIOLIN SOLO Vol.8, CD 2016: Karl Amadeus Hartmann, Sonatas No. 1 & 2, Suites No. 1 & 2 (1927);
- VIOLIN SOLO Vol.7, 3-CD Set 2014: Johann Sebastian Bach, Sonatas and Partitas BWV 1001 - 1006 (1720); Valentin Silvestrov, Postludium II (1982/83).
- VIOLIN SOLO Vol.6, CD 2014: Eugène Ysaӱe, Sonatas No. 1 - 6 (1923); Joaquín Rodrigo, Capriccio (1944).
- VIOLIN SOLO Vol.5, SACD 2010: Sergey Prokofiev, Sonata op.115 (1947); Ljubica Marić, Sonata fantasia (1929); Grażyna Bacewicz, Polnish Caprices no.1 (1949) and no.2 (1952), Sonata (1941), Eduard Tubin, Sonata (1962), Suite on Estonian Dance Tunes (1979); Edison Denisov, Sonata (1978).
- VIOLIN SOLO Vol.4, SACD 2008: Ernest Bloch, Suite no.1 (1958) and no.2 (1958); Igor Strawinsky, Élégie (1944); Grażyna Bacewicz, Four Caprices (1968); Aram Khachaturian, Sonata-Monologue (1975); Alfred Schnittke, a paganini (1982).
- VIOLIN SOLO Vol.3, SACD 2007: Paul Hindemith, Studien (1916), Sonata op.11, Sonata op.31 No.1 (1924), Sonata op.31 No.2 (1924), Satz und Fragment aus einer Sonate (1925); Anatol Vieru, Capriccio (1977); Vladimir Martynov, Partita (1976).
- VIOLIN SOLO Vol.2, SACD 2006: Erwin Schulhoff, Sonata (1927); Béla Bartók, Sonata (1944); Grażyna Bacewicz, Sonata (1958); Darius Milhaud, Sonatine pastorale op.383 (1960); Dimitri Nicolau, Sonata in Greek Mood op.228 (2002).
- VIOLIN SOLO Vol.1, CD 2001: Max Reger, Chaconne op.117 no.4; Johanna Senfter, Sonata op.61 (1930); Nikos Skalkottas, Sonata (1925); Arthur Honegger, Sonata (1940).
- Max Reger, the complete works for Solo Violin on 4 CDs 1999-2002: CD 1 2000, Four Sonatas op.42 (1899); CD 2 (2-CD Set) 1999, Seven Sonatas op.91 (1906); CD 3 2002, Seven Preludes and Fugues, Chaconne op.117 (1909/1912); CD 4 2002, Preludes and Fugues 131a (1914), Preludes and Fugues op. posth. (1902), Prelude op. posth. (1915).
- Strassenmusik n.16, Duos for Violin & Violoncello, with Friedemann Kupsa violoncello, CD 2002: Zoltán Kodály, Duo op.7; Elizabeth Maconchy, Theme and Variations (1951); Anatol Vieru, Sonata (1984–85); Dimitri Nicolau, Strassenmusik n.16 op.210 (2001).
- Duo mon amour, Duos for Violin & Violoncello, with Friedemann Kupsa violoncello, CD 2000: Maurice Ravel, Sonata (1920-1922); Darius Milhaud, Sonatina (1953); Arthur Honegger, Sonatina (1932); Nikos Skalkottas, Sonata (1947).
- Max Reger, Edition Piano Chamber Music with Wolfram Lorenzen and Siegfried Mauser Piano, 3 CDs: CD 1 1997, Violin Sonatas opp. 72 (1903) and 139 (1915); CD 2 1997, Piano Quintet op.64 (1903), Piano Trio op.102 (1908); CD 3 1998, Piano Quartets opp.113 (1910) and 133 (1914).
- Melomania String Quartets, CD 1997: Elisabeth Lutyens, Violeta Dinescu, Gloria Coates.
- Arthur Bliss, CD 1997: String Quartet no.1 (1941), String Quartet no.2 (1950).
- Darius Milhaud, String Quartets no.1 - 8, 3 CDs 1994-95: CD 1 1994, String Quartet no.1 op.5 (1912), String Quartet no.2 op.16 (1914–15); CD 2 1995, String Quartet no.3 op.31 (1916), String Quartet no.4 op.46 (1918), String Quartet no.5 op.64 (1920); CD 3 1996, String Quartet no.6 op.77 (1922), String Quartet no.7 op.87 (1925), String Quartet no.8 op.121 (1932).
- Fanny Hensel, Chamber Music, CD 1994: Piano Quartet (1822), Chamber Music (1834), Piano Trio op.11 (1846-47).
- Germaine Tailleferre, Chamber Music, CD 1993: Violin Sonata no.1 (1921), Violin Sonata no.2 (1948), String Quartet (1919), Piano Trio (1978)
- Grażyna Bacewicz, String Quartets, CD 1992: String Quartet nr.4 (1950) String Quartet nr.6 (1959–60), String Quartet nr.7 (1965).
- Ethel Smyth, Chamber Music Vol.3, CD 1992: Double Concerto in A (1926), (version with Piano), Horn: Franz Draxinger, Piano: Céline Dutilly).
- Ethel Smyth, Chamber Music Vol.1 and Vol.2 (2-CD Set) 1991: Violin Sonata op.7 (1887), String Quintet op.1 (1883), String Quartet (1902/12)
