= Fanny Mendelssohn Quartet =

The Munich Fanny Mendelssohn String Quartet, Renate Eggebrecht 1st violin, Mario Korunic 2nd violin, Stefan Berg viola, Friedemann Kupsa cello, was founded in 1989 in the occasion of the performance and publication of String Quartet in E♭ major and Piano Quartet in A♭ major by Fanny Hensel née Mendelssohn at the Gasteig in Munich.

The quartet has played music by women composers including many first performances such as works by Violeta Dinescu, Gloria Coates, Fukuo Yamagushi, Renate Birnstein and Mayako Kubo (Reinbert Evers, guitar).

The quartet recorded the chamber music by Fanny Hensel (Stefan Mickisch, piano) and Ethel Smyth as world premiere CD recordings. They also presented the world premieres of the String Quartets of Elisabeth Lutyens. Gloria Coates and Violeta Dinescu, as well as CD recordings of the string quartets by Grazyna Bacewicz, Germane Tailleferre, Arthur Bliss and Darius Milhaud (with sopano Ulrike Sonntag). In 1997 the ensemble recorded the great piano chamber music by Max Reger, his Piano Quintet in C minor and his two Piano Quartets, with pianist Wolfram Lorenzen.

The Fanny Mendelssohn Quartet debuted at the Schleswig-Holstein Musik Festival with the interpretation of the String Quartet E minor by Ethel Smyth and the Piano Quartet by Fanny Hensel (Céline Dutilly, piano). The musicians performed the chamber music of Hensel at the Chard Music Festival, England, for the first time.

== CD recordings ==
- Fanny Mendelssohn, String Quartet E flat major (1834), Piano Quartet A flat major (1822) (world premiere recordings)
- Ethel Smyth, String Quintet E major op.1, String Quartet E minor (1912) (world premiere recordings)
- Germaine Tailleferre, String Quartet (1919)
- Grażyna Bacewicz, String Quartets N° 4 (1950), N° 6 (world premiere recording) (1960), N° 7 (1965)
- Elisabeth Lutyens, String Quartet N° 6 op. 25, Violeta Dinescu, String Quartet Terra Lonhdana (1984), Gloria Coates, String Quartet N° 3 (1975) (world premiere recordings)
- Darius Milhaud, String Quartets N° 1 op. 5, N° 2 op.16, N° 3 op. 32 with soprano (world premiere recording), N° 4 op. 46, N° 5 op. 64, N° 6 op. 77, N° 7 op. 87, N° 8 op. 121, Machines agricoles op. 56, Catalogue de Fleurs op.60 (world premiere recording)
- Arthur Bliss, String Quartet N° 1 B flat major (1941), String Quartet N° 2, F minor (1950)
- Max Reger, Piano Quintet C minor op. 64, Piano Quartet D minor op. 113, Piano Quartet A minor op. 133

== Members ==
- Renate Eggebrecht, violin
- Mario Korunič, violin
- Stefan Berg, viola
- Friedemann Kupsa, violoncello
