= Friedemann Kupsa =

Austrian cellist

Friedemann Kupsa (* September 7, 1943 in St.Pölten, Austria) is an Austrian Cellist.

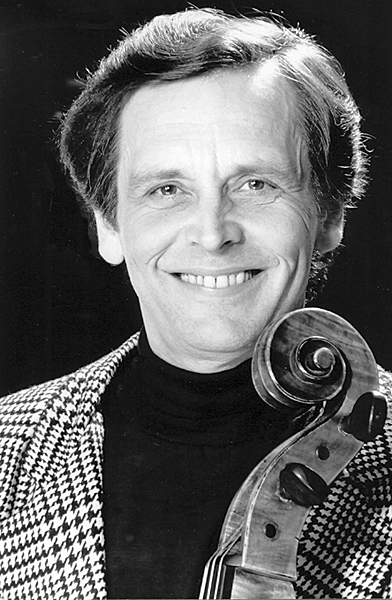
The cellist Friedemann Kupsa

Friedemann Kupsa studied at the Hochschule für Musik und Theater, Vienna, and attended masterclasses with Daniil Shafran (cello) and the La Salle Quartet (chamber music). He is a member of the Munich Radio Orchestra.

He has been a member of the Fanny Mendelssohn Quartet since 1986, receiving international acclaim for numerous first recordings on CD of music by Fanny Mendelssohn-Hensel, Ethel Smyth, Germaine Tailleferre and Grażyna Bacewicz. With the pianist Wolfram Lorenzen he recorded the great chamber works of Max Reger, and his commitment to 20th-century chamber music is further shown by his recording of the first eight string quartets by Darius Milhaud and the two great quartets by Arthur Bliss.

He made the first-ever recording of Ethel Smyth's two cello sonatas and has also attracted attention by recording cello works by Nadia Boulanger.

In addition, together with the pianist Céline Dutilly, he issued a recording of the two works for cello and piano by Fanny Mendelssohn-Hensel: the Sonata o Fantasia, as a world premiere, and the Capriccio.

Friedemann Kupsa has displayed his commitment to the music of the twentieth century with the world premiere recording of the Duo Sonatas by the Greek composer Nikos Skalkottas and the Romanian composer Anatol Vieru. Along with the Duo Sonatas by Maurice Ravel, Zoltán Kodály and the Variations by Elizabeth Maconchy, Kupsa played the world premiere of the duo composition Strassenmusik No 16 by Dimitri Nicolau, which is dedicated to the two soloists Renate Eggebrecht, violin, and Friedemann Kupsa, violoncello.

With his ensemble, Kupsa has played numerous concerts, including at the Schleswig-Holstein Music Festival, Toblach Gustav Mahler Festival, the Chard Music Festival of Women, the Lucca Music Festival, the Munich Music Festival of Women, and the Moravia Festival, accompanied by radio productions and live television recordings.

== Recordings ==
- Kodály, Maconchy, Vieru, Nicolau; Sonatas for Violin & Violoncello (Renate Eggebrecht, violin), 2002
- Ravel, Milhaud, Honegger, Skalkottas; Sonatas for Violin & Violoncello (Renate Eggebrecht, violin), 2000
- Reger; Piano Trio op. 102, Piano Quartets opp. 113 and 133, Piano Quintet op. 64 (Wolfram Lorenzen, piano), 1996–98
- Lutyens, Dinescu, Coates; String Quartets, 1997
- Bliss; String Quartets, 1995
- Milhaud; String Quartets Nr. 1–8, 1994–95
- Fanny Mendelssohn; Piano Quartet, String Quartet, Piano Trio, 1994, "Sonata o Fantasia", "Capriccio" for violoncello & piano, 2003
- Tailleferre; Piano Trio, String Quartet, 1992
- Bacewicz; String Quartets Nr. 4, 6, 7, 1991
- Smyth; Violoncello Sonata A-minor op. 5, String Quartet, String Quintet, 1990, Violoncello Sonata C-minor (1880), 1997
- Nadia Boulanger; Three Pieces for Violoncello & Piano (1913), 1993
