= Livia Frege =

German soprano (1818–1891)

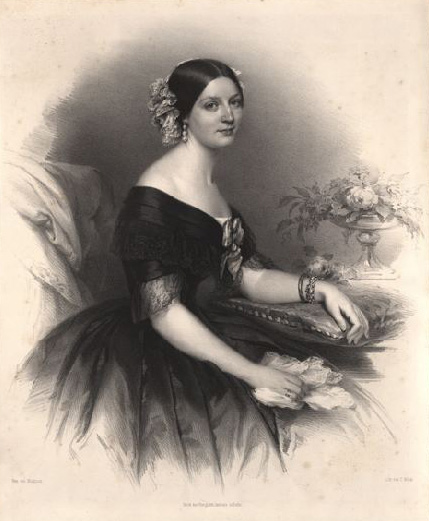
- Born: Virginia Livia Gerhardt; 13 June 1818; Gera, Germany
- Died: 22 August 1891 (aged 73); Abtnaundorf, Germany
- Occupation: Soprano
- Years active: 1832-1836

Virginia Livia Frege, née Gerhardt (13 June 1818 – 22 August 1891) was a German singer (soprano), Prima Donna of the Leipzig Stadttheater, arts patron and co-founder of the Leipzig Bach Society. She was referred to as the "Queen of Leipzig's romantic song singing". Frege is best known for her performances of the works by Felix Mendelssohn Bartholdy. Her repertoire included songs by Heinrich Marschner, Franz Schubert, Robert Schumann and Mendelssohn.

== Early life and education ==
Livia Gerhardt was born in Gera, a daughter of the businessman Johann Christian Gerhardt (1764–1839) and Anna Christiane Friederike Bartholomäi. She was trained as a soprano by Christian August Pohlenz in Leipzig. In 1834, she took lessons from the singer Wilhelmine Schröder-Devrient in Dresden in order to perfect her skills.

== Career ==
Livia Gerhardt made her debut on 9 July 1832 at the age of 14 in the Leipzig Gewandhaus in a concert by Clara Wieck with an aria and a duet by Ferdinando Paer. In October 1832, Livia Gerhardt received the position of second concert singer at the Gewandhaus in Leipzig. The next year, in 1833, she debuted as Amazili in Louis Spohr's Jessonda. In the following two years she performed 32 roles including Julia in I Capuleti e i Montecchi by Vincenzo Bellini, Alice in Robert le diable by Giacomo Meyerbeer, Page Cherubin in The Marriage of Figaro by Wolfgang Amadeus Mozart, Rosine in The Barber of Seville by Gioachino Rossini and others. In spring 1835, she made a guest appearance at the Weimar Theater and in July 1835 received an engagement at the Königsstädtische Theater in Berlin.

In 1835–1836, she was singing at the Berlin Royal Opera. Gerhardt went back to Leipzig after her marriage in 1836 with the lawyer Woldemar Frege and ended her stage career at the age of 18. Livia Frege only appeared occasionally after her marriage, mostly at charity and church concerts and in 1843 sang the role of Peri in the world premiere of Schumann's oratorio Das Paradies und die Peri op. 50.

Freges regularly welcomed musicians and their friends in their apartment at Bahnhofstrasse 6 (today Georgiring) in Leipzig and the summer residence in Abtnaundorf. Among the guests were Robert and Clara Schumann, Heinrich and Elizabeth von Herzogenberg, Conrad and Constanze Schleinitz, Felix Mendelssohn, Joseph Joachim, Otto Nicolai, August Pohlenz and Hermann Hartel. A choir association with around 50 members regularly gathered in their house in the 1850s and 1860s. Livia Frege also used the Paulinerkirche for performances by her choir.

In June 1848 together with Julius Rietz, Ferdinand David and Heinrich Behr, Frege organized a charitable concert to support factory workers from Saxony where she performed works by Mendelssohn (An die Entfernte from Op. 71 No. 3) and Rietz (Was singt und sagt ihr mir and Elfe). The concerts held at Freges have influenced and to a great extent formed the tastes of the private music society. So, the Wagners' biographer Friedrich Glasenapp held Frege family and some other private musical circles accountable for Richard Wagner's rather unimpressive reception in Leipzig. Frege died in Abtnaundorf.

== Personal life ==
In 1836 Livia Gerhardt married the lawyer Woldemar Frege. Her husband came from a very wealthy and important Leipzig merchant family. Livia and Woldemar Frege had two sons. The first, Viktor, died in 1841 at a young age. The second, Arnold Woldemar von Frege-Weltzin, later became a member of the Saxon Landtag and Reichstag.

Frege was friends with Felix Mendelssohn Bartholdy, Robert and Clara Schumann as well as Ferdinand David and was also in a lively correspondence with Franz Liszt.

== Honors ==
At the golden wedding anniversary in 1886, the Frege family received the hereditary title of nobility from King Albert of Saxony.

Liviastrasse in Leipzig's Waldstrasse district was named after Livia Frege in 1889.

Several works are dedicated to Livia Frege, including:

- Felix Mendelssohn, Sechs Lieder op.57
- Heinrich Marschner, Der Gefangene, for solo voice and pianoforte op.141 (first edition 1849)
- Robert Schumann, Op. 36, 6 Gedichte (1840), (first edition in 1842)
- Robert Schumann, Op. posth. 142, 4 Gesänge (1852), (first edition in 1858
- Clara Schumann, 6 Lieder from "Jucunde" von Hermann Rollet for solo voice with pianoforte op. 23 (composed 1853, first edition 1856).
