= Johanna Senfter =

German composer

Johanna Senfter (27 November 1879 – 11 August 1961) was a German composer.

== Family background ==
Johanna Senfter was born in 1879 as the youngest of the six children of Elise and Georg Senfter. Her maternal grandfather was the Oppenheim pharmacist and quinine manufacturer Friedrich Koch (1786-1865), who succeeded in extracting an antipyretic and anti-infective agent from cinchona bark to combat malaria, which was rampant in Oppenheim at the time. To produce this quinine, he set up his own pharmaceutical factory. The successful production of the drug enabled the Koch family's social and financial upswing. The son of company founder, Carl Koch, eventually became mayor and, thanks to his achievements in this office, an honorary citizen of the town.

Johanna's father, Georg Senfter, owner of a brickworks, coal and timber business, was also considered wealthy. He married Elise, Carl Koch's sister, and acquired the imposing Sparrhof, an old aristocratic residence, including the vineyard, which had previously belonged to the von Cronberg family. In 1864, he joined Carl Koch's quinine company as managing director, co-entrepreneur and financier.

Both families belonged to the upper social class, led a prosperous life and owned a large house.

== Childhood and first steps ==
Johanna Senfter and her four sisters were brought up in girls' boarding schools and received piano and singing lessons in line with the educational ideals of the time. Her art-loving and music-loving parents supported their daughter Johanna's talent, which was already evident in her early childhood. A severe case of diphtheria between the ages of 9 and 13 brought an abrupt break in her hitherto carefree childhood. Although she recovered, her unstable health had a major impact on her life afterwards.

After her recovery, she attended the Frielinghaus Institute in Frankfurt, a recognized boarding school for girls. From 1895, at the age of 16, she studied music theory and composition under Iwan Knorr, violin under Adolf Rebner, piano under Karl Friedberg and organ under Prof. Gelhaar at the Hoch Conservatory in Frankfurt am Main. After 8 years of study, she received her diploma in June 1903, but wanted to expand and deepen her musical knowledge and compositional technique.

== Pupil of Max Reger ==
From March 1908 to 1910, she was a pupil of Max Reger (from October 1908 in Reger's composition class at the Leipzig Royal Conservatory), who encouraged her in her stylistic independence, emphasized her excellent musical talent and described her as his best pupil. She completed her studies at the conservatory with distinction in July 1909.

In 1910, she received the Arthur Nikisch Prize for the best student composition of the previous year.

The Reger and Senfter families remained close until Reger's death in 1916.

== Intensive creative period ==
After Reger's death in 1916, Senfter entered a period of creativity with numerous compositions and concert appearances. In 1921, she founded the Musikverein Oppenheim and organized her own concert series, during which she also performed her own works. In 1923, she founded the Oppenheim Bach Society and regularly performed Bach cantatas.

Altogether, Senfter left behind 134 works of all genres with the exception of opera (some cite 180, including 9 symphonies, 26 orchestral works with vocal and instrumental solos, chamber music in various instrumentations, organ works, choirs and songs) and gave many concertos for piano, cello, violin and viola. She was a masterful composer of fugue.

She continued to compose into old age and shaped the musical life of her home town of Oppenheim, where she lived until her death in 1961.

== Self-imposed isolation ==
The artist closed herself off to a wider audience ("Listen to and play my music, then you will understand me.").

She dedicated her life solely to music and fell into oblivion after her death in 1961. Prejudices about female composers, who were denied the ability to be creative in this field until well into the second half of the 20th century, may also have contributed to this ("If I weren't a woman, I would have it easier.").

== Legacy and rediscovery ==
After her death, Johanna Senfter’s manuscripts were incorporated into the holdings of the Cologne University of Music. Her musical estate has not yet been fully catalogued. In recent years, efforts have increased to rediscover and promote her work through publications and performances. The pianist Monica Gutman has been particularly active in advancing awareness of Senfter’s music in the Rhine-Main region.

The violinist Friedemann Eichhorn has recorded works for violin and piano or for two violins together with Paul Rivinius (piano) and Alexa Eichhorn, having previously participated in the editing of Senfter's works for this instrument for publication by the Schott publishing house in Mainz.

Johanna Senfter was featured as Composer of the Week on BBC Radio 3 the week of March 4, 2024.

== Discography ==
- Music for Cello & Piano by Female Composers, by Thomas Blees (cello), Maria Bergmann (piano) : Cello Sonata in A Major, Op. 10
- Johanna Senfter: Complete Works For Viola and Piano, by Roland Glassl (viola), Oliver Triendl (piano)
- Female Composers: Pieces for Violin and Piano, by Setareh Najfar-Nahvi (violin) & Theresia Schumacher (piano) : 6 Little Pieces for Violin & Piano, Op. 13 (1 and 3)
- Johanna Senfter: Works for Violin, by Friedemann Eichhorn (violin), Paul Rivinius (piano), Alexia Eichhorn (violin)
- Violin Solo, by Renate Eggebrecht (violin) : Violin Sonata in G minor, Op. 61
- Johanna Senfter: Werke für Klavier, by Monica Gutman
- Symphony n°4 In B-Ma, Op. 50, Jenaer Philharmonie, Othmar Mága (stream only)
- Clarinet Quintet in B major, Op. 119, Ernesto Molinari (clarinet), Brenton Langbein and Andreas Pfenninger (violins), Nicolas Corti (viola), Raffaele Altwegg (cello)
- Max Reger, Johanna Senfter: Clarinet Quintets, by Kilian Herold, Armida Quartett: Clarinet Quintet in B major, Op. 119
- Piano Quintet op. 64, Maureen Jones (piano), Brenton Langbein and Andreas Pfenninger (violins), Nicolas Corti (viola), Raffaele Altwegg (cello)
- Johanna Senfter - Sonata for Cello & Piano in E flat op 79; Sonata for Clarinet & Piano in A op 57, by Michael Gareis, Reimar Ulrich & Stephan Landgrebe
- Senfter: Compositions For Two Violins, Katarina Aleksic, Aleksandra Maslovaric, Budapest Symphony Orchestra : Concerto in C minor for Two Violins and String Orchestra, op. 40; Ten Old Dances for Two Violins, opus 91
- Feminae in Musica (Feminae Records, 2007) : Elegie, op. 13, no. 3 by Aleksandra Maslovaric (violin), Tania Fleischer (piano)
- Chamber Music (CPO, 2024) : Piano Quartet in E minor, op.11; Sonata in D major for clarinet, viola, horn and piano, op.37; Trio in G major for clarinet, horn and piano, op.103; Clarinet Quintet in B flat major, op.119; Clarinet Sonata in A major, op.57. Else Ensemble
- Senfter: Symphonies Nos. 1 & 9 (Capriccio 2026), Deutsche Staatsphilharmonie Rheinland-Pfalz and Chelsea Gallo
- Johanna Senfter: Symphony No.4 op.50 & Piano Concerto op.90 (CPO 2026), NDR Radiophilharmonie, Oliver Triendl, piano & Hossein Pishkar

== Literature ==
- Christiane Maier: Johanna Senfter – Eine Oppenheimer Komponistin – Biographische Notizen zu Max Regers Meisterschülerin. Oppenheimer Hefte, (Johanna Senfter - An Oppenheimer Composer - Biographical notes on Max Reger's master student.) Oppenheimer Geschichtsverein (Oppenheimer History Association), Nr. 7. Ed.: 1993, ISBN 3-87854-092-2, pp. 2–39. (Based on her master's thesis from the same year)
- Wolfgang Birtel: Johanna Senfter: Sonate (Konzert) für zwei Violinen und Streichorchester c-Moll, op. 40 – Original und Bearbeitung. In: Mitteilungen der Arbeitsgemeinschaft für mittelrheinische Musikgeschichte. 80, 2006, pp. 3–11.
