= Amantis (disambiguation) =

Amantis is a genus of praying mantises native to Asia and the islands of the Pacific Ocean.

Amantis may also refer to:

- Confessio Amantis ("The Lover's Confession"), a 33,000-line Middle English poem by John Gower
- Lachrimæ Amantis ("A Lover's tears"), a pavan by Dowland in 1604 from Lachrimae, or Seaven Teares
- Paragigagnathus amantis, a species of mite

== See also ==
- Amanti (disambiguation)
