= Amanti =

Amanti may refer to:

- Kia Opirus, a Kia car model also marketed as the Amanti
- Amanti (film), a 1968 Italian film directed by Vittorio De Sica
- Lucio Amanti (born 1977), Canadian cellist

== See also ==
- Amantis (disambiguation)
