= Andreas Bauer Kanabas =

German opera singer

- Born: Andreas Bauer; Jena, Germany
- Education: Musikhochschule Dresden; Musikhochschule Weimar
- Occupation: Operatic bass
- Organizations: Staatsoper Unter den Linden; Oper Frankfurt
- Website: www.kanabas.de/en/

Andreas Bauer Kanabas is a German classical bass in opera and concert. Prior to December 2018, he performed under the name Andreas Bauer. A member of the Oper Frankfurt, he has performed major roles at German and international opera houses. Besides Mozart's Sarastro, and kings in operas by Verdi and Wagner such as Philip II of Spain and Marke, he has portrayed characters such as Bluebeard, Tiresias, and Ibn-Hakia.

== Career ==
Born in Jena to a musical family, Bauer learned the piano with his mother, and sang in children's choirs. He trained to be a sound engineer. He then studied voice at music universities, at the Hochschule für Musik Carl Maria von Weber in Dresden and at the Hochschule für Musik Franz Liszt, Weimar, with Eugen Rabine. He also studied privately with Paolo Barbacini in Italy and with Robert Lloyd in London. While studying, he was engaged at the theatre of Annaberg-Buchholz, the Eduard-von-Winterstein-Theater, where he learned many major roles. He then was a member of the Theater Würzburg.

Bauer was a member of the Staatsoper Unter den Linden from 2007 to 2012, where he appeared in roles such as Titurel in Wagner's Parsifal, conducted by Daniel Barenboim, Colline in Puccini's La bohème and Timur in his Turandot, conducted by Andris Nelsons, Sarastro in Mozart's Die Zauberflöte and Don Alfonso in his Così fan tutte, Don Basilio in Rossini's Il barbiere di Siviglia, and Trulove in Stravinsky's The Rake’s Progress, conducted by Ingo Metzmacher.

Bauer has been a member of the Oper Frankfurt from 2013, where he appeared as Vodník in Dvořák's Rusalka, Daland in Wagner's Der fliegende Holländer and Fiesco in Verdi's Simon Boccanegra, among others. He was Heinrich in Wagner's Lohengrin, and a reviewer described his voice as bright, evenly controlled, and with marvelous timbre ("heller wunderbar gleichmäßig geführter Bass herrlich timbriert"), also noting his commanding stage presence. He appeared in the title role of Bartók's Bluebeard's Castle, which Barrie Kosky staged in a double bill with Purcell's Dido and Aeneas. A reviewer noted that he sang with high atmospheric density ("mit großer atmosphärischer Dichte") alongside Claudia Mahnke as Judith. In October 2018, he appeared in another double bill, as Tiresias in Stravinsky's Oedipus rex (sung in Latin), and as the physician Ibn-Hakia in Tchaikovsky's last opera Iolanta (in Russian), which was directed by Lydia Steier and conducted by Sebastian Weigle. He portrayed Philipp II in 2019, conducted by Stefan Soltesz, and King Marke in a new 2020 production of Wagner's Tristan und Isolde, again conducted by Weigle. His monologue was regarded as a highlight of the evening, in a vocally mature interpretation of penetrating depth.

In 2015, Bauer performed the role of the Hermit in Weber's Der Freischütz at the Semperoper in Dresden, conducted by Christian Thielemann, in a performance which was recorded. He made his debut at the Seattle Opera as Zaccaria in Verdi's Nabucco, conducted by Carlo Montanaro, where a reviewer called his voice a basso profondo, rich in the low register. He performed the role also in Riga with the Latvian National Opera, and also appeared there as Méphistophélès in Gounod's Faust. Bauer has appeared at more international opera houses, performing the role of Sarastro at the Opéra-Comique in Paris, the Komische Oper Berlin, in Abu Dhabi, Budapest and Malmö, working with conductors such as Claudio Abbado, Colin Davis, Gustavo Dudamel, Philippe Jordan, and Simon Rattle. He appeared at the Royal Opera House in London first as Sarastro in the 2019/20 season.

Bauer is also active in concert and oratorios. He performed the bass solo in Mozart's Requiem at La Scala in Milan, and Verdi's Requiem at the Gasteig in Munich. His repertory includes works by Johann Sebastian Bach, Handel's Messiah and Dettingen Te Deum, Haydn's Die Schöpfung and Nelson Mass, Beethoven's Missa solemnis, Schumann's Szenen aus Goethes Faust, Mendelssohn's Elias and Paulus, Brahms' Ein deutsches Requiem, Dvořák's Stabat Mater, and Puccini's Messa di Gloria.
