= Armida Quartet =

German string quartet

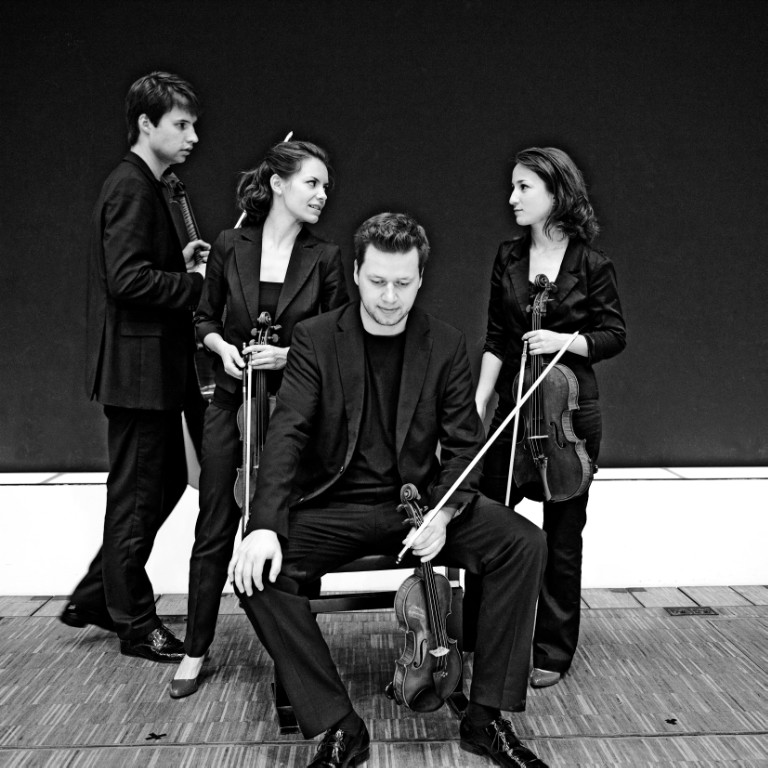
Armida Quartet, 2016

The Armida Quartet, named after the eponymous opera by Joseph Haydn, is a German string quartet. The ensemble includes Martin Funda (violin), Johanna Staemmler (violin), Teresa Schwamm (viola) and Peter-Philipp Staemmler (violoncello).

== History ==
The quartet was founded in Berlin in 2006 and studied with members of the Artemis Quartet. They attended Master classes with the Alban Berg Quartet, the Guarneri Quartet and Arditti Quartet.

The four musicians became known through their success at the ARD International Music Competition in 2012, where the Armida Quartet was awarded 1st prize, the audience prize and six other special prizes. In September 2014, the quartet was included in the BBC series "New Generation Artists." In the 2016/2017 season, the quartet participated at the "Rising Stars" series of the European Concert Halls (ECHO).

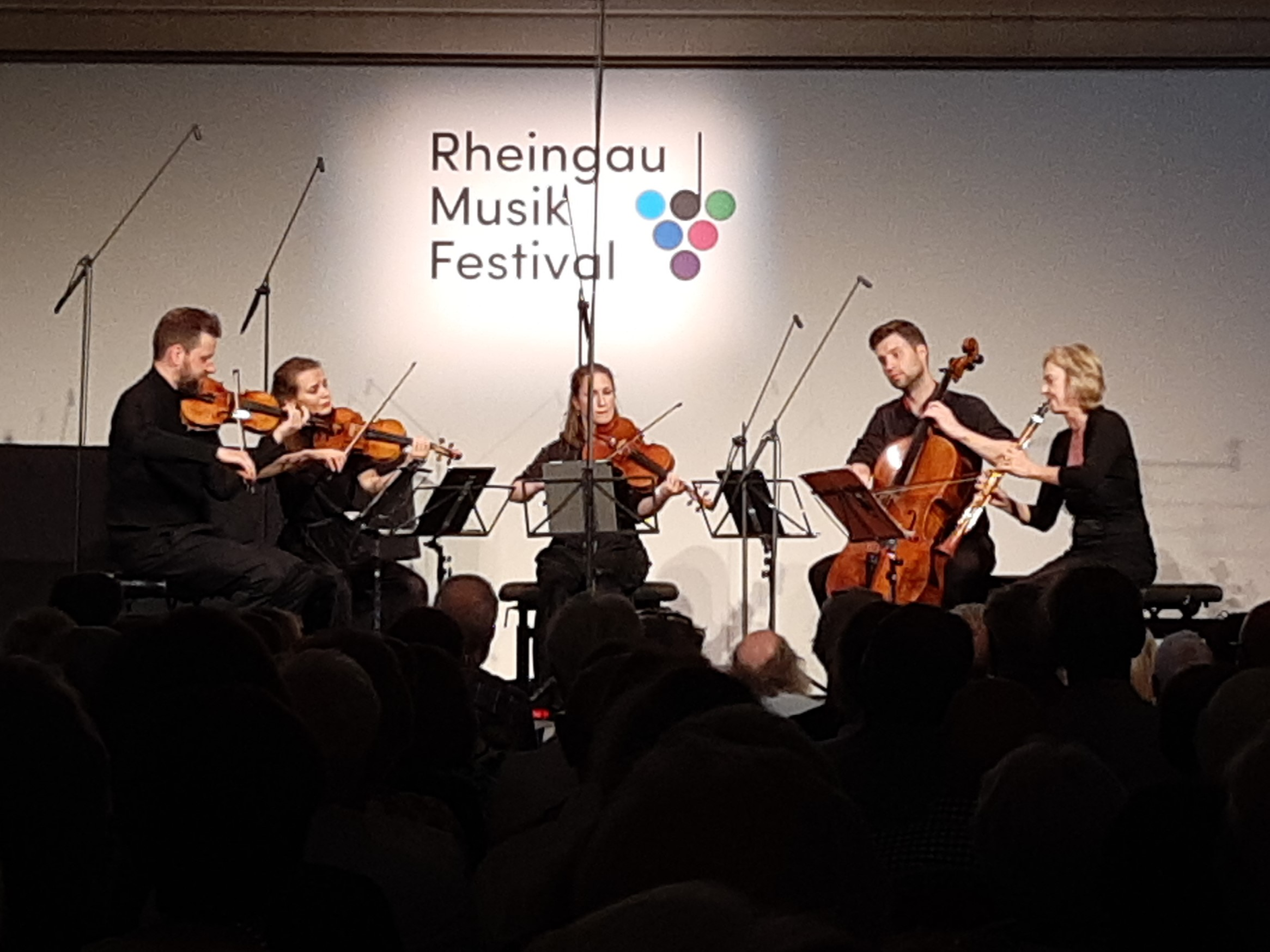
RMF, Schloss Johannisberg, Armida Quartet, Sabine Meyer, 2024

The Armida Quartet has also performed at the Schleswig-Holstein Music Festival, the Rheingau Musik Festival, the Festspiele Mecklenburg-Vorpommern, the Davos Festival and the Heidelberger Frühling. In 2014, the quartet also made its first concert tour to China, Taiwan and Singapore.

Violinist Martin Funda has been teaching chamber music at the Berlin University of the Arts, University of Music Franz Liszt Weimar and State University of Music and Performing Arts Stuttgart.

== Awards ==
In 2011, the Armida Quartet won the first prize and the audience prize at the Geneva International Music Competition. Before that, the ensemble received various scholarships, including from the Irene Steels-Wilsing Foundation and the Schierse Foundation Berlin. In 2013, the quartet's debut CD with works by Béla Bartók, György Ligeti and György Kurtág was released and shortly afterwards was included in the best list of the Preis der deutschen Schallplattenkritik.

== Recording ==
- 2013: Ursula Mamlok: Streichquartett Nr. 1 (1962) (Naxos)
- 2013: Bartók – Kurtág – Ligeti (CAvi)
- 2015: Dvořák – Scharwenka (with Ewa Kupiec, Randall Meyers)
- 2015: Mozart (CAvi Music), Opus Klassik
- 2016: Beethoven – Shostakovich (CAvi Music)
- 2023: Klarinettenquintette Reger – Senfter (with Kilian Herold) (DG)
