= Paragigagnathus insuetus =

Scientific classification
- Domain: Eukaryota
- Kingdom: Animalia
- Phylum: Arthropoda
- Subphylum: Chelicerata
- Class: Arachnida
- Order: Mesostigmata
- Family: Phytoseiidae
- Genus: Paragigagnathus
- Species: P. insuetus

Binomial name
- Paragigagnathus insuetus (Livshitz & Kuznetsov, 1972)

Species of mite

Paragigagnathus insuetus is a species of mite in the family Phytoseiidae.
