= Jürgen Rost =

German classical guitarist and professor (born 1945)

- Born: 7 March 1945 (age 80); Jena
- Occupations: Classical guitarist, Professor

Jürgen Rost (born 7 March 1945) is a classical guitarist and was Professor of Guitar at The Liszt School of Music Weimar, Germany.

Rost was born in Jena and studied under Roland Zimmer and Ursula Peter at the Liszt School of Music Weimar. He has won many competitions, both national and international, and his performances include television, radio, commercial recordings and live concerts in many countries, performing both solo and in a duo with his wife, Monika Rost.

He became Professor of Guitar at the Liszt School of Music and taught a number of successful performers, including Thomas Fellow, Venci Pavlov, Karoline Kumst, Magdalena Kaltcheva, Nora Buschman, Petr Saidl and the Kaltchev Guitar Duo Ivo and Sofia Kaltchev. In 1993, together with his wife, he initiated the Anna Amalia Guitar Competition in Weimar. He retired in 2010 and today teaches exceptional students at the Musikgymnasium Schloss Belvedere.
