= Lucio Amanti =

Italian cellist and composer

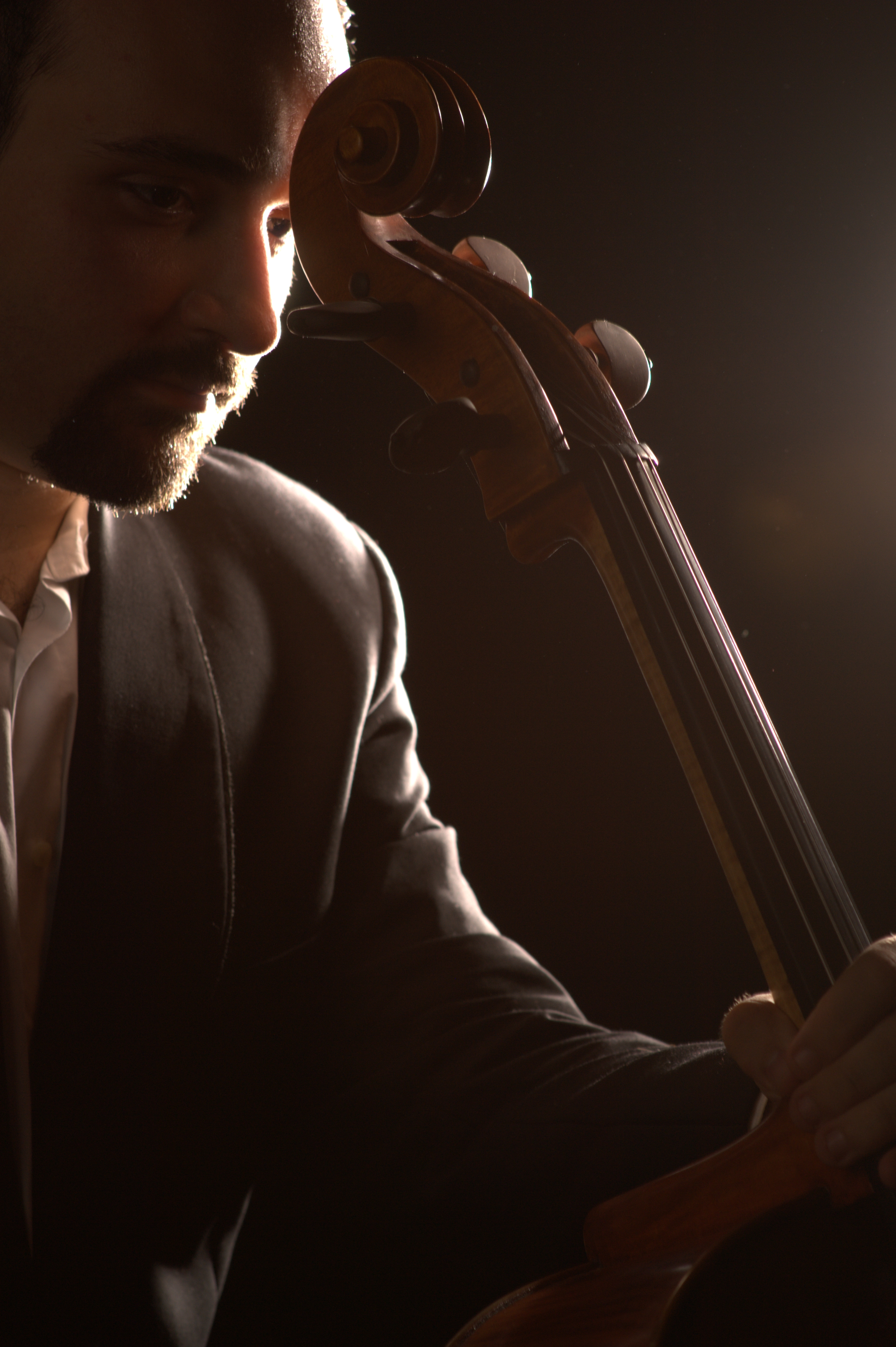

Background information
- Born: November 14, 1977 (age 48); Montreal, Quebec, Canada
- Genres: Jazz, classical
- Instrument: Cello
- Website: www.jazzcello.net

Lucio Franco Amanti (born November 14, 1977) is an Italian cellist and composer. Amanti´s music is characterized by the integration of jazz and pop idiom into classical music forms.

== Life and career ==
Amanti was born in Montreal (Canada) to Italian Parents that shortly after his birth decided to move back to Italy. There, Amanti took his first piano lesson age 4 and cello (age 8) and age 9, he started his studies first in cello and later Composition at the "San Pietro a Majella" Conservatory. All through his ten years studies he performed as soloist and with orchestra for the Italian national broadcast (Italian "Rai") and in venues such as Teatro San Carlo, S. William Walton´s foundation and the Ravello Festival. As an active composer, Amanti had his first experience age 19 when he became part of the Composer´s workshop (Italian "Bottega di Composizione"): a group of composition students founded by celebrated Italian composer Roberto De Simone which works were many times performed in the major theaters in Italy. In 2002, the legendary cellist Janos Starker invited Amanti to study with him at the Indiana University School of music in Bloomington USA. After two years studies, due to his newly discovered passion for improvisation, Amanti decided to deepen his curriculum studying Composition, jazz and improvisation with the composer, and jazz pedagogue, Dr. David Baker (composer).

During this time, Amanti wrote many compositions and arrangements for different ensembles, searching to build the foundations for a dialogue between the jazz and classical tradition. After graduating in 2006 with both a Diploma in classical cello and a master's degree in "Jazz Studies" Amanti moved to Berlin (Germany), where he started to perform, solo and with his trio, in major jazz clubs and new music places. Shortly after, he was forced to put his performances career to rest due to a major arm injury, His started then to work for a major design company and their "Sound Branding" team, with different functions: creative producer, musical consultant and eventually composer for clients such as Audi, Siemens, Deutsche Post and Commerzbank just to name a few. Few years later, Amanti started again performing solo or in collaboration with other projects having the chance to tread the boards of the Edinburgh Jazz festival, the Jazz Tage Leverkusen and the Salle Cortot and the UNESCO in Paris. Since 2010, most of his music is published by Schott music and have been premiered by musicians such as Eckart Runge Artemis quartet, Arnau Thomas Cuarteto Casals and the Armida Quartet. As teacher, Amanti has given many lectures in composition, cello and improvisation: also at the UdK "Jazz Institute Berlin" and at the Indiana University "Jacobs School of Music".

== Selected works and publisher ==
Cello Solo

- "JAZZ SUITE" (Schott Music, CB 224)
- "JAZZ SUITE" Nr.2 (Schott Music, in progress)
- "20 ETUDES" "Steps to improvisation" (Schott Music, ED 21599)

Violin Solo

- "Concert piece" (in progress)

Cello and Piano

- "JAZZ SONATA" (Schott Music, CB 231)
- "JAZZ SONATA" Nr.2 (Schott Music, CB 260)

Two Cellos

- " JAZZ DUETS" "25 easy pieces in 1st position" (Schott Music, ED 21598)
- "SANCHO´S DREAM" (Schott Music, in progress)

String Quintet (2Vl, Vla, 2Vcl)

- "GENESIS" (to Franz Schubert) (Schott Music, in progress)

Cello and Big Band

- "AFRO BLUE" (with David Baker (composer))

Orchestra Scores

- "PULCINELLA´S SECRET" for Piano solo and Orchestra.
- "CONCERTO" for Cello solo and Orchestra (in progress)

== Discography ==
- Jazzcello (2008)
- Solo Jazz (2010)
