= Paragigagnathus =

Scientific classification
- Kingdom: Animalia
- Phylum: Arthropoda
- Subphylum: Chelicerata
- Class: Arachnida
- Order: Mesostigmata
- Family: Phytoseiidae
- Genus: Paragigagnathus; Amitai & Grinberg, 1971

Genus of mites

Paragigagnathus is a genus of mites in the Phytoseiidae family.

== Species ==
- Paragigagnathus amantis (Chaudhri, Akbar & Rasool, 1979)
- Paragigagnathus bidentatus (Kuznetsov, 1994)
- Paragigagnathus cataractus (Ueckermann & Loots, 1988)
- Paragigagnathus desertorum (Amitai & Swirski, 1978)
- Paragigagnathus insuetus (Livshitz & Kuznetsov, 1972)
- Paragigagnathus molestus (Kolodochka, 1989)
- Paragigagnathus namibiaensis (Ueckermann & Loots, 1988)
- Paragigagnathus strunkovae (Wainstein, 1973)
- Paragigagnathus tamaricis Amitai & Grinberg, 1971 Paragigagnathus madinahensis Alatawi, Kamran and Basahih 2016
