= Monika Rost =

German guitarist, lute player and musicologist (born 1943)

- Born: 21 February 1943 (age 83); Dresden
- Occupations: Classical guitarist, lutenist, professor and musicologist

Monika Rost (born 21 February 1943) is a classical guitarist, lute player and musicologist. She studied with Ursula Peter at the Liszt School of Music Weimar, Germany, and later became Professor and Head of Guitar there herself.

She has performed in many countries, both solo and in a duo with Jürgen Rost, and has made a number of recordings. She has won many first prizes, including the Concours International de la Guitare in Paris (Radio France), "with special honours from the jury".

She taught many successful performers and international guitar competition prize winners in her role at the Liszt School of Music Weimar. Her pupils have included Boyan Karanjuloff, Tomasz Zawierucha, Samuel Klemke and Nora Buschman.
