= Manfred Schmitz =

German composer and pianist

Manfred Schmitz (25 April 1939 – 7 July 2014) was a German composer and pianist.

== Biography ==
He received a degree in piano at the Franz-Liszt Academy in Weimar, where he later taught from 1968 to 1984. After 1984, Schmitz acted as a freelance composer and performer, then he moved to Berlin and taught at the Köpenick Music School. He was also involved with AMA-Verlag. a publishing house for mostly pedagogical music and recordings. He died in 2014 of cancer.

Schmitz wrote numerous short educational pieces in contemporary styles, especially jazz. These include a musical, Max und Moritz, widely popular in music schools in Germany. Schmitz also wrote two piano concertos, as well as an orchestra version of Der 13. Monat based on texts by Erich Kästner.

== Notable works ==
- Die Neue Jazz Parnass – 155 Etueden, Stuecke und Studien zum kreativen Klavierspiel (The New Jazz Parnass – 155 Etudes, Pieces and Studies for creative piano play)
- Jugendalbum für Klavier (Youth Album for Piano)
