= Kaltchev Guitar Duo =

Bulgarian guitar duo

- Origin: Germany, Bulgaria,
- Genres: Classical
- Occupation: Guitarist
- Instruments: Classical guitar
- Years active: 1995–present
- Members: Ivo Kaltchev, Sofia Kaltchev
- Website: http://www.kaltchev.de

Kaltchev Guitar Duo is a guitar duo from Bulgaria.

== Biography ==
Couple Ivo and Sofia Kaltchev completed their studies at the University of Music - "Franz Liszt" in Weimar with Prof. Jürgen Rost. During their studies, they won six first prizes at international chamber music competitions. Numerous productions in cooperation with international radio and television stations followed, as well as concerts in over 20 countries. The Kaltchev Guitar Duo has performed several world premieres and performs frequently with renowned symphony orchestras. In addition, both musicians are invited regularly to give masterclasses and take part as jury members at international music festivals. From 2006 to 2013 they taught at the State University for Music and Performing Arts in Stuttgart, where they were appointed as honorary professors in 2011.

In 2009 (until 2021) Ivo and Sofia Kaltchev took over the artistic direction of the "Aschaffenburger Gitarrentage" and initiated the "International Competition for Chamber Music with Guitar" in Aschaffenburg/ Germany.

== Recordings ==
- Gitarrenfestspiele Nuertingen (1997; Burger & Mueller)
- tonadilla (1999; diapason)
- Crossing Borders (2004; CCN-music)
- Joaquin Rodrigo - Concierto Madrigal & Concierto Andaluz (2011; Trekel Records)

== Awards ==
- 1st Prize at the "4th Competition for Interpretations of 20th Century music" in Detmold (Germany) for duo formations of all kind.
- 1st Prize at the competition at Nürtingen Guitar Festival (Germany)
- 1st Prize at the "8th International Guitar competition" in Havana, Cuba, as well as the prize for the best Interpretation of the Cuban compulsory piece.
- 1st Prize at the "5th International Music Competition for guitar duos" in Bubenreuth, Germany
- 1st Prize of the "Prize for Culture of the Unna economy" Germany
- 1st Prize at the "19th International Guitar Competition for duo formations of all kind with guitar" in Bari, Italy
