= Friedemann Eichhorn =

German musician

- Born: 1971 (age 54–55); Münster, Germany
- Genre: Classical violinist

Friedemann Eichhorn (born 1971) is a German classical violinist.

== Biography and career ==
Eichhorn was born in Münster, Germany, and studied violin with Valery Gradow at the Mannheim University of Music. He continued his studies with Alberto Lysy, at the International Menuhin Music Academy in Gstaad, Switzerland, then went on to study at the Juilliard School, where he worked with Margaret Pardee, Earl Carlyss, Samuel Sanders and Miguel Harth-Bedoya. Eichhorn has received scholarships from the German Academic Exchange Service, the Menuhin Academy and the Juilliard School]], among others. Friedemann also studied musicology and law at the Johannes Gutenberg University in Mainz, where he earned a Ph.D..

Eichhorn has performed with many orchestras, including the St. Petersburg Philharmonic and Symphony, the Munich Symphony Orchestra, the Hamburg Symphonies, and the Southwest Germany Radio Symphony Orchestra. He has performed at a number of music festivals, including the Schleswig Holstein Music Festival, Kronberg Cello-Festival, Menuhin-Festival Gstaad, Focus Festival, New York, and Killington, Vermont. He has worked with conductors such as Yehudi Menuhin, Howard Griffiths and David Stahl, and performed with musicians such as Yuri Bashmet, Gidon Kremer, and Igor Oistrach. As a chamber musician, he was worked with Julius Berger, Alexander Huelshoff, José Gallardo, Gerhard Oppitz and Thomas Müller-Pering.

Eichhorn has recorded a number of CDs, for the Hänssler Classic, Claves, and Naxos labels. He has recorded works by Hermann, Rode, Servais and others.

Eichhorn teaches violin at the Liszt School of Music in Weimar, Germany, and is the Artistic Director of the Kronberg Academy in Kronberg, Germany.

Friedemann is married to violinist Alexia Eichhorn, who also teaches at the Liszt School of Music. Their son is pianist Justus Eichhorn.
