= Justus Eichhorn =

German pianist and composer (born 2009)

Justus Friedrich Eichhorn (born 2009) is a German pianist.

Eichhorn was born in Weimar, Germany, to violinists Friedemann Eichhorn and Alexia Eichhorn, who both teach at the University of Music Franz Liszt Weimar. He trained under Professor Grigory Gruzman at the University of Music Franz Liszt Weimar, studying particularly the music of Carl Czerny. He won first prize at the 2019 Carl Bechstein Competition in Berlin. With his cello partner Albrecht Freytag, they won first prize and a special prize for outstanding duo performance at the 2024 German National Youth Music Competition (Bundeswettbewerb Jugend musiziert).

Eichhorn's debut album, The Source, was released by Deutsche Grammophon in September 2026, and includes three original compositions.
