= Heinrich von Herzogenberg =

Austrian composer (1843–1900)

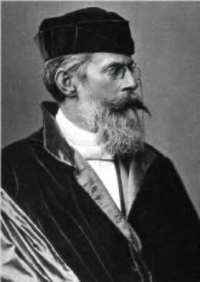

Background information
- Born: Heinrich Picot de Peccaduc; 10 June 1843; Graz, Austrian Empire
- Died: 9 October 1900 (aged 57) Wiesbaden, German Empire

Heinrich Picot de Peccaduc, Freiherr von Herzogenberg (10 June 1843 – 9 October 1900) was an Austrian composer and conductor descended from a French aristocratic family.

He was born in Graz and was educated at a Jesuit school in Feldkirch and also in Munich, Dresden and Graz before studying law, philosophy and political science at the university of Vienna. He soon turned his energies to music and attended the composition classes of Felix Otto Dessoff until 1864. Early on he was attracted to the music of Richard Wagner, but after studying J. S. Bach's works he became an adherent of the classical tradition and an advocate for the music of Brahms. In 1866 he married Elisabeth von Stockhausen, who had been a piano pupil of Brahms; Brahms's letters to and from both Herzogenbergs form one of the most delightful sections of his correspondence. They lived in Graz until 1872, when they moved to Leipzig. In 1874, with the Bach scholar Philipp Spitta, Herzogenberg founded the Leipzig Bach-Verein, which concerned itself with the revival of Bach’s cantatas. Herzogenberg was its artistic director for ten years, during which time Ethel Smyth was one of his composition pupils. From 1885 he was Professor of Composition at the Hochschule für Musik in Berlin. It was in this capacity that he advised the young Ralph Vaughan Williams to study with Max Bruch. He died suddenly in Wiesbaden, aged 57; in his last years he used a wheelchair due to necrosis of the joints.

Herzogenberg was a well-schooled composer of definite gifts. In 1876 he wrote a set of Variations on a theme of Brahms (his op. 23, for piano four hands, on the Brahms song, Die Trauernde, op. 7 no. 5), but despite Elisabeth’s cajoling Brahms almost never expressed approval of his works. It has been suggested that Brahms was piqued that Herzogenberg had married Elisabeth, of whom he was himself extremely fond. Toward the end of his life, Brahms grudgingly relented somewhat, writing “Herzogenberg is able to do more than any of the others.”

While Herzogenberg has been characterized as a mere epigone of Brahms, many of his compositions show little or no overt Brahmsian influence: for example, his two string trios op. 27 Nos. 1 & 2; while some early compositions, pre-dating his acquaintance with Brahms, have features in common with the older composer.

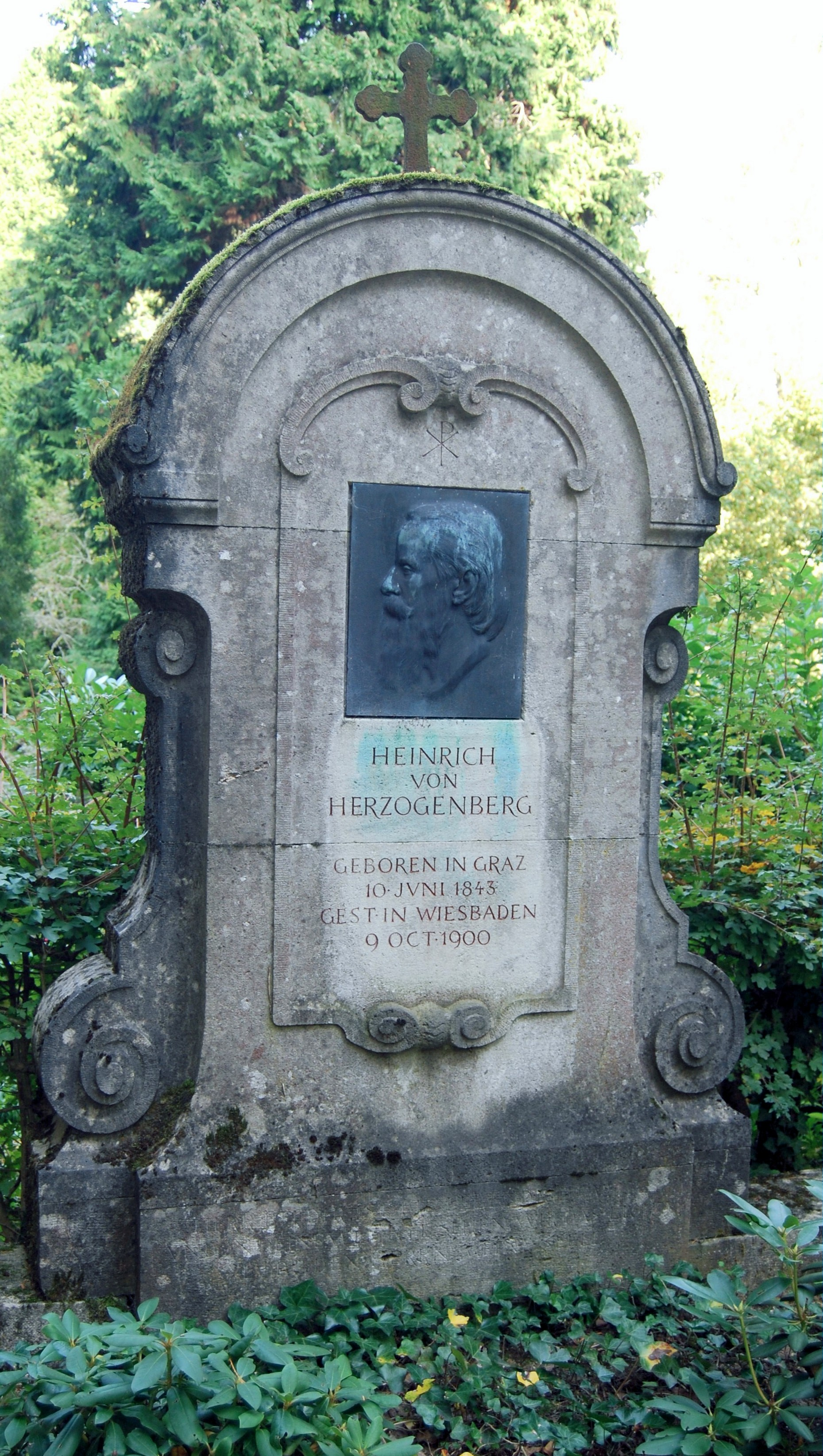

Towards the end of his life he concentrated on providing music for communal worship in the Lutheran Evangelical Church in Strasbourg, under the influence of Friedrich Spitta, brother of Philipp Spitta, who was professor of theology there, though Herzogenberg himself remained Roman Catholic. His models in these pieces were the Bach oratorios and passions, with chorales designed to be sung by the congregation and played by only a small instrumental ensemble. He also wrote a large-scale Mass in memory of Philipp Spitta, for which Friedrich Spitta selected the text. Several of Herzogenberg’s major works were thought to have been destroyed during World War II but resurfaced during the 1990s.

== Works ==
Choral works

- Lieder for mixed chorus, op. 10
- Columbus, op. 11, Cantata (published Leipzig, 1872).
- Psalm 116, op. 34 (printed by Hänssler Musik Verlag, 1990)
- Nanna's Klage for soprano, alto, small chorus and orchestra, op. 59 (Leipzig: Rieter-Biedermann, 1887)
- Requiem, op. 72 (published Leipzig, 1891)
- Cantata Todtenfeier, op. 80 (1893) (libretto by Philipp Spitta's brother, Friedrich)
- Mass in E minor for soloists, chorus and orchestra, op. 87 (published by Carus-Verlag in Stuttgart, 2002)
- Oratorio Die Geburt Christi, op. 90 (1894)
- Die Passion, op. 93 (1896)
- Die Erntefeier, op. 104 (published by Leipzig : Rieter-Biedermann, 1899)

Vocal works

- Five songs for high voice and piano, op. 29 (published Leipzig and Winterthur, 1881)
- Five songs for high voice and piano, op. 30 (published Leipzig and Winterthur, 1881)
- Geistliche Gesänge for high voice, violin and organ, op. 89

Orchestral works

- Nine symphonies:
  - Symphony in D minor, WoO 1 (unpublished, 1866)
  - Symphony in E minor, WoO 2 (unpublished, 1871?)
  - Odysseus, op. 16 (published Leipzig, 1873)
  - Symphony in F major, WoO 25 (unpublished, 1870-71)
  - Symphonisches Stück, WoO 26 (unpublished, 1872-73?)
  - Symphony, WoO 28 (unpublished, 1875)
  - Symphony in C minor, WoO (1878; possibly identical with the C minor symphony Op. 50)
  - Symphony no. 1 in C minor, op. 50
  - Symphony no. 2 in B♭ major, op. 70
- Cello Concerto, WoO.30 (1880) (lost)
- Serenade, flute, oboe, clarinet, 2 bassoons, 2 horns & strings (1879)
- Violin Concerto in A major Joseph Joachim gewidmet, WoO 4 (1889)
- Rondo for Violin & Orchestra (Transcription of Mozart's rondo K511 for piano solo)

Chamber music

- Piano quintet in C major, op. 17 (1875) (Leipzig:Breitkopf & Härtel, 1876)
- String quintet in C minor (2 Violins, 2 Violas, Cello), op. 77 (Leipzig: Rieter-Biedermann, 1892- date of composition and publication)
- Piano trios in C minor, op. 24 (1875-6, first published 1877 by Rieter-Biedermann) and in D minor, op. 36 (1882, first published 1884 by Rieter-Biedermann) (both republished by Carus-Verlag, 2001)
- String trios, op. 27 no. 1 in A (1879) and no. 2 in F (from the cpo recordings)
- Five string quartets, op. 18 in D minor, op. 42 nos. 1-3 (in G minor, D minor, and G major), dedicated to Johannes Brahms (published Leipzig: Rieter-Biedermann, 1884), op. 63 in F minor, dedicated to Joseph Joachim
- Quintet for winds and piano, op. 43 in E♭ major
- Trio for piano, oboe and horn, op. 61
- 2 piano quartets, opp. 75 and 95 (dedicated to Brahms)
- 3 Legenden (3 Legends) for viola and piano, op. 62 (1889)
- Sonatas including
  - Violin sonata op. 32 in A Joseph Joachim gewidmet (Leipzig: Rieter-Biedermann, 1882)
  - Violin sonata, op. 54 in E♭ (published in Leipzig, 1887)
  - Violin sonata, op. 78 in D minor (Leipzig: Rieter-Biedermann, 1892)
  - Cello sonata no. 1 in A minor, op. 52 (around 1886)
  - Cello sonata no. 2 in D, op. 64 (1890)
  - Cello sonata no. 3 in E♭ major, op. 94 (around 1895) (Leipzig: J. Rieter-Biedermann, 1897)

Piano music

- Eight variations, op. 3
- Four fantasy pieces, op. 4 (published in Leipzig about 1866)
- Fantastic Dances, op. 9 (published around 1870 in Vienna)
- Theme and variations, op. 13 for 2 pianos (Wien: Gotthard, 1872)
- Variations on a Theme by Johannes Brahms for four hands, op. 23 (Gräfeling: W. Wollenweber, 1998)
- Allotria for piano duet, op. 33
- Five piano pieces, op. 37 (published about 1879 in Leipzig)
- Waltzes for piano duet, op. 53
- Variations on the Minuet from 'Don Juan' , op. 58
- Capriccio, op. 107

Organ works

- Orgel-Phantasie on "Nun komm, der Heiden Heiland", op. 39
- Orgel-Phantasie "Nun danket alle Gott", op. 46
- Six choral preludes, op. 67
