= Carlo Montanaro =

Italian violinist and conductor

Carlo Montanaro (born in Cecina) is an Italian violinist and conductor. He concentrates on Italian operas from Bel canto to verismo and also conducts selected works from the French repertoire.

== Career ==
Montanaro completed his violin studies at the Conservatorio Luigi Cherubini in Florence and began his musical career with the Orchestra del Maggio Musicale Fiorentino in 1991. He was discovered and promoted by Zubin Mehta, came to the University of Music and Performing Arts Vienna, where he studied conducting with Leopold Hager, Ervin Acél and Takuo Yuasa for three years.

Since 2001 he has been a guest at numerous opera houses worldwide:

- In Italy he has conducted at the Teatro dell'Opera di Roma, the Teatro Cilea of Reggio, Calabria, the Teatro Lirico Giuseppe Verdi of Trieste, the Festival Verdi in Parma, the Arena di Verona and the Sferisterio Opera Festival of Maccerata, in Palermo, Milan and Florence.
- In Germany, he took on engagements at the Deutsche Oper Berlin, at the Württembergischen Staatsoper in Stuttgart and at the Semperoper in Dresden, Frankfurt am Main and Hamburg.
- Further engagements took him to St. Petersburg, Bilbao, Athens and Tel Aviv, Colorado, Denver and Seattle, to Montreal, to the New National Theatre Tokyo and to the Handa Opera Festival in Sydney.

From 2011 to 2014 he worked as music director at the Teatr Wielki in Warsaw.

He also regularly undertakes concert engagements, again focusing on works from the Italian repertoire, such as Verdi's Requiem. He gave guest performances at the Accademia di Santa Cecilia in Rome, at the Herkulessaal in Munich and at the Musikverein für Steiermark in Graz.
