= Elisabeth von Herzogenberg =

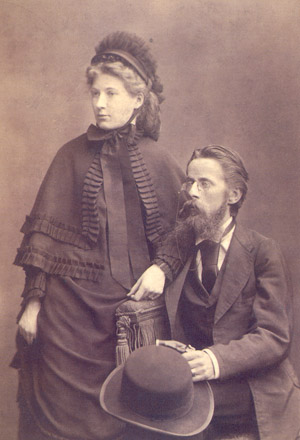
- Elisabeth and Heinrich von Herzogenberg
- Born: 13 April 1847; Paris
- Died: 7 January 1892 (aged 44); Sanremo
- Occupations: Composer; philanthropist; pianist; singer

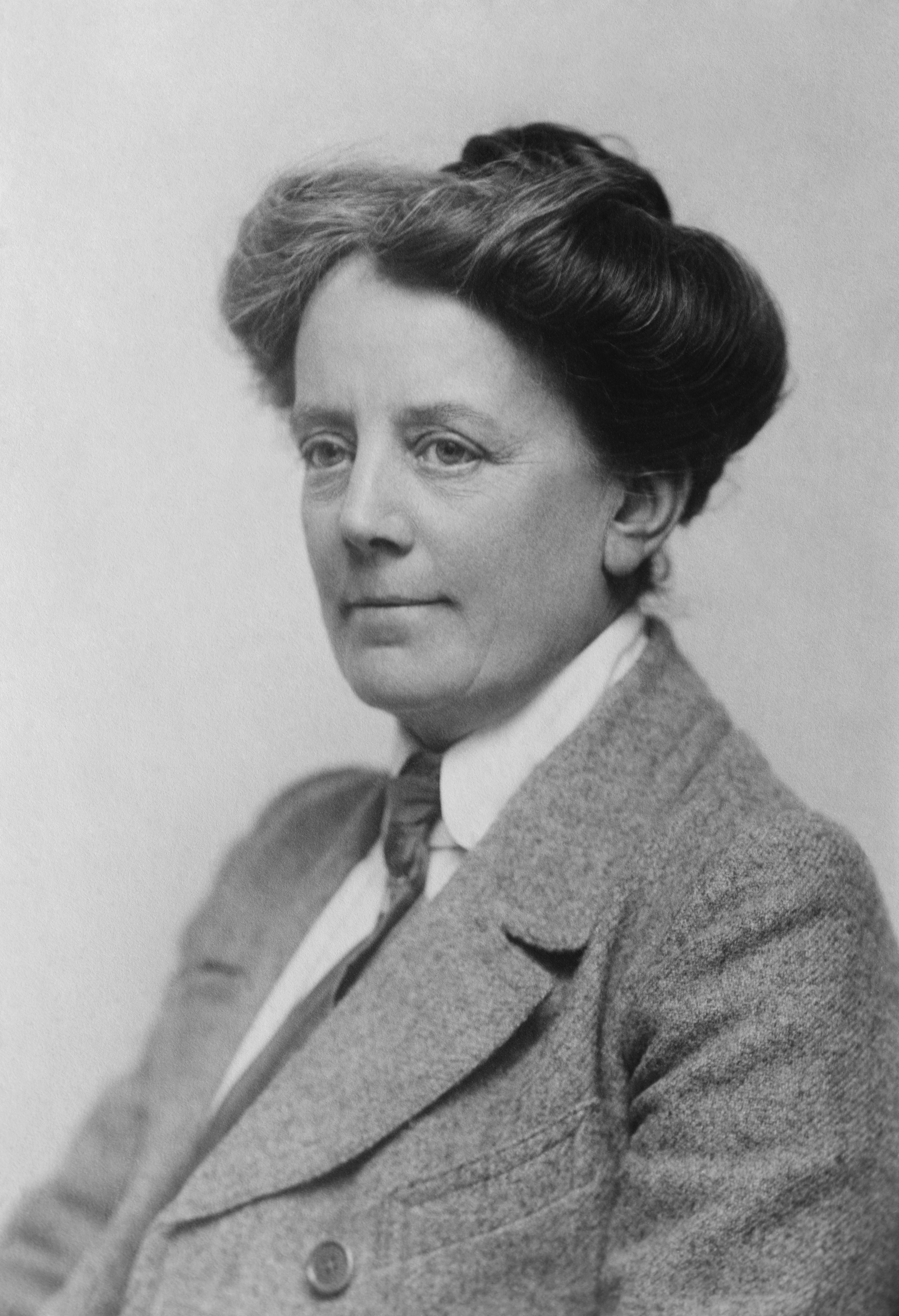
Composer Ethel Smyth was her lover

Elisabeth von Herzogenberg née Elisabeth von Stockhausen (13 April 1847 – 7 January 1892) was a German pianist, composer, singer and philanthropist.

== Biography ==
Elisabeth von Stockhausen was born in Paris, France in 1847. Her father had served as a Hanoverian ambassador and was a pianist linked to Frédéric Chopin and Charles-Valentin Alkan. Although a Protestant, Elisabeth married the Catholic Heinrich von Herzogenberg. She is known in large part for her association with Johannes Brahms, with whom she studied, and with whom she and her husband corresponded copiously. As an aristocratic musician, she largely did not perform or publish for the public, but did arrange children's folk songs. Her lover, the composer Ethel Smyth, devoted chapter XX of Impressions That Remained: Memoirs to her.

== Edited works ==
- 24 Volkskinderlieder for voice and piano (1881)
- 8 Klavierstücke
