= Paragigagnathus amantis =

Scientific classification
- Domain: Eukaryota
- Kingdom: Animalia
- Phylum: Arthropoda
- Subphylum: Chelicerata
- Class: Arachnida
- Order: Mesostigmata
- Family: Phytoseiidae
- Genus: Paragigagnathus
- Species: P. amantis

Binomial name
- Paragigagnathus amantis (Chaudhri, Akbar & Rasool, 1979)

Species of mite

Paragigagnathus amantis is a species of mite in the family Phytoseiidae.
