= Ethel Smyth =

English composer and suffragette (1858–1944)

Dame Ethel Smyth DBE
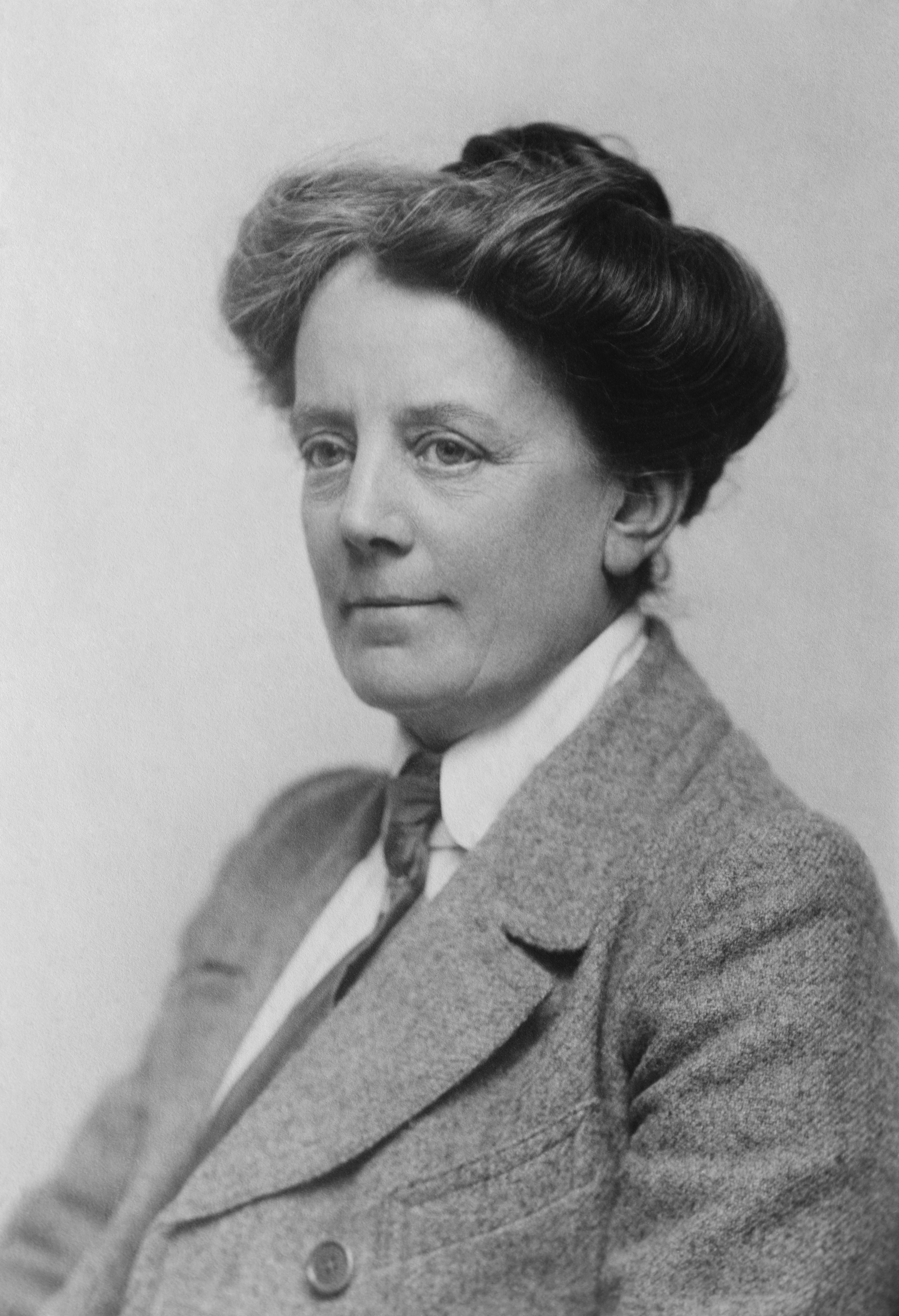
- Smyth in 1922
- Born: 22 April 1858; London, England
- Died: 8 May 1944 (aged 86); Woking, England
- Education: Leipzig Conservatory
- Occupations: Composer and suffragette
- Works: List of compositions

Dame Ethel Mary Smyth DBE (/smaɪθ/; 22 April 1858 – 8 May 1944) was an English composer and a member of the women's suffrage movement. Her compositions include songs, works for piano, chamber music, orchestral works, choral works and operas.

Smyth tended to be marginalised as a "woman composer", as though her work could not be accepted as mainstream. Yet when she produced more delicate compositions, they were criticised for not measuring up to the standard of her male peers. She was the first female composer granted a damehood.

Smyth was involved in the suffrage movement and spent time in Holloway Prison for breaking windows. She also composed the suffragette anthem The March of the Women.

== Family background ==
Ethel Smyth was born at 5 Lower Seymour Street, Marylebone, London on 22 April 1858, the fourth of eight children. While 22 April is the actual date of her birth, Smyth habitually stated it was 23 April, the day that was celebrated by her family, as they enjoyed the coincidence with William Shakespeare's. Her father, John Hall Smyth, who was a major general in the Royal Artillery, was very much opposed to her making a career in music. The home of her early years was Sidcup Place in Sidcup, then in Kent. From 1867 her family base was Frimhurst, near Frimley Green; from 1894 she lived at One Oak, also in Frimley, before moving in 1910 to Hook Heath on the outskirts of Woking. Her youngest brother was Robert ("Bob") Napier Smyth (1868–1947), who rose to become a Brigadier in the British Army.

== Musical career ==
Smyth was a child prodigy. She was a stellar pianist at a very young age and was able to compose her first hymn by the age of 10. She decided to study music at the age of 12. Smyth first studied with Alexander Ewing when she was 17. He introduced her to the music of Wagner and Berlioz. After a major battle with her father about her plans to devote her life to music, Smyth was allowed to advance her musical education at the Leipzig Conservatory, where she studied Brahmsian musical composition with Carl Reinecke. She left after a year, however, disillusioned with the low standard of teaching, and continued her music studies privately with Heinrich von Herzogenberg. While at the Leipzig Conservatory, Smyth met Dvořák, Grieg and Tchaikovsky. Through Herzogenberg, she also met Clara Schumann and Brahms. Upon her return to England, Smyth formed a supportive friendship with Arthur Sullivan in the last years of his life; he respected her and encouraged her work.

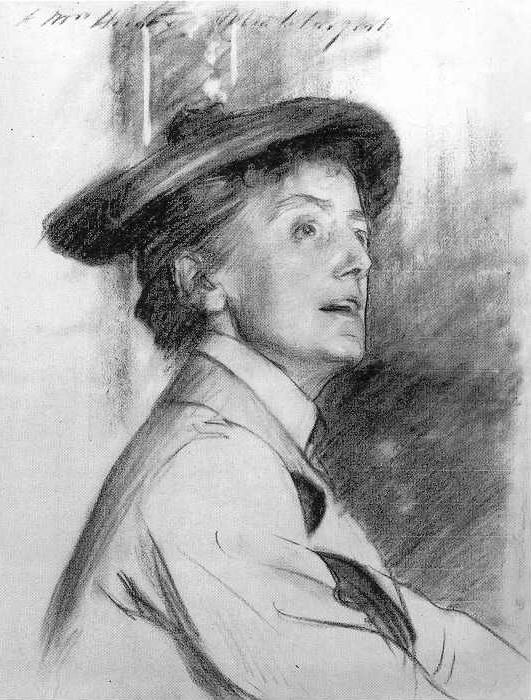
Drawing of Ethel Smyth, singing and playing, by John Singer Sargent (1901)

Smyth's extensive body of work includes the Concerto for Violin, Horn and Orchestra and the Mass in D. It was the latter's performance in London's Albert Hall in 1893 that helped her gain recognition as a serious composer. Her opera The Wreckers is considered by some critics to be the "most important English opera composed during the period between Purcell and Britten". Her best known work, she composed it to a French libretto by Henry Brewster. It premiered in 1906. In 2022 it received its first professional production in its original French text at the Glyndebourne Festival Opera. It was also performed at the BBC Proms, where its prelude or overture was presented 28 times between 1913 and 1994.

Another of her operas, Der Wald, mounted in 1903, was, for more than a century, the only opera by a woman composer ever produced at New York's Metropolitan Opera (until Kaija Saariaho's L'Amour de loin in December 2016).

On 28 May 1928, the nascent BBC broadcast two concerts of Smyth's music, marking her "musical jubilee", The first comprised chamber music, the second, conducted by Smyth herself, choral works. Otherwise, recognition in England came somewhat late for Smyth, wrote the conductor Leon Botstein at the time he conducted the American Symphony Orchestra's US premiere of The Wreckers in New York on 30 September 2007:

On her seventy-fifth birthday in 1934, under Beecham's direction, her work was celebrated in a festival, the final event of which was held at the Royal Albert Hall in the presence of the Queen. Heartbreakingly, at this moment of long-overdue recognition, the composer was already completely deaf and could hear neither her own music nor the adulation of the crowds.

After her release from prison, Smyth composed her final major work, the hour-long vocal symphony The Prison, setting a text by Henry Bennett Brewster. It was first performed in 1931. The first recording was issued by Chandos in 2020. Smyth’s composing and conducting career came to a premature end before the 1920s as she started to develop hearing loss, which eventually led to her becoming completely deaf. However, she found a new interest in literature and, between 1919 and 1940, she published ten highly successful, mostly autobiographical, books.

=== Critical reception ===
Overall, critical reaction to her work was mixed. She was alternately praised and panned for writing music that was considered too masculine for a "lady composer", as critics called her. Though Smyth’s four movement Serenade earned her orchestral and public debut in England, she had to use the pseudonym E.M. Smith to avoid biased criticism. Eugene Gates writes that:

Smyth's music was seldom evaluated as simply the work of a composer among composers, but as that of a "woman composer". This worked to keep her on the margins of the profession, and, coupled with the double standard of sexual aesthetics, also placed her in a double bind. On the one hand, when she composed powerful, rhythmically vital music, it was said that her work lacked feminine charm; on the other, when she produced delicate, melodious compositions, she was accused of not measuring up to the artistic standards of her male colleagues.

Other critics were more favourable: "The composer is a learned musician: it is learning which gives her the power to express her natural inborn sense of humour... Dr. Smyth knows her Mozart and her Sullivan: she has learned how to write conversations in music... [The Boatswain's Mate] is one of the merriest, most tuneful, and most delightful comic operas ever put on the stage."

== Involvement with the suffrage movement ==
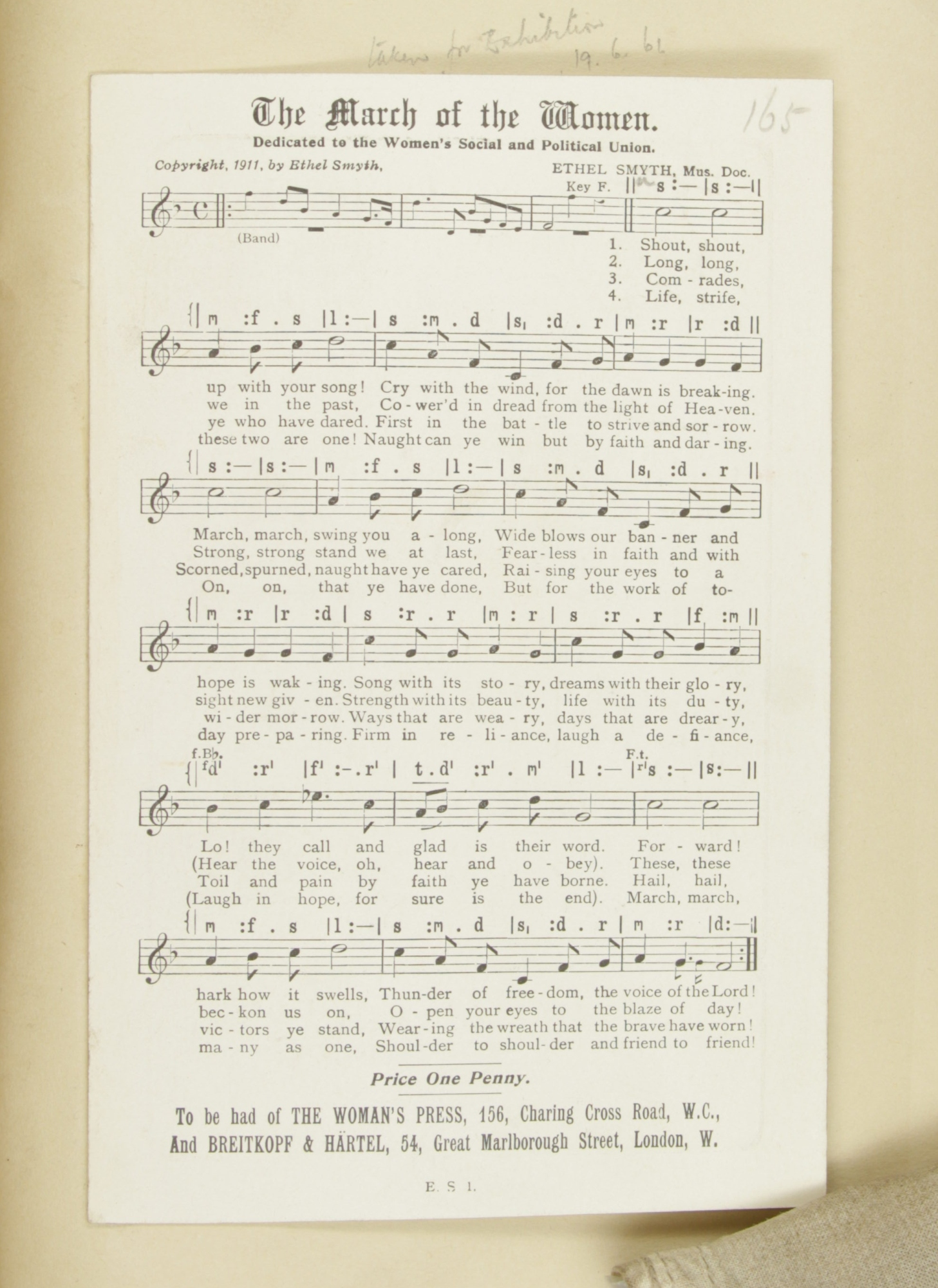
Smyth's "The March of the Women"

In 1910, Smyth joined the Women's Social and Political Union (WSPU), which agitated for women's suffrage, giving up music for two years to devote herself to the cause. Smyth argued in her memoirs that the disadvantages that women face in music stem from the lack of a political vote or voice. She developed a very close relationship with the charismatic leader of the WSPU, Emmeline Pankhurst, and accompanied her on many occasions. Soon after, Smyth composed her most famous, "The March of the Women" (1911) to words by Cicely Hamilton. The text was used to inspire women to unite and free themselves from patriarchal rule. This eventually became the anthem of the WSPU and the suffragette movement.

Smyth is credited with teaching Emmeline Pankhurst how to throw stones in 1912. After further practice aiming stones at trees near the home of fellow suffragette Zelie Emerson, Pankhurst called on WSPU members to break a window of the house of any politician who opposed votes for women. Smyth was one of the 109 members who responded to Pankhurst's call, asking to be sent to attack the home of Colonial Secretary Lewis Harcourt, who had remarked that if his wife's beauty and wisdom was present in all women, they would have already won the vote.

Smyth stood half the bail for Helen Craggs, who had been caught on the way to carry out the arson of the leading politician's home. During the stone-throwing, Pankhurst and 100 other women were arrested, and Smyth served two months in Holloway Prison. When Thomas Beecham, her proponent-friend, went to visit her there, he found suffragettes marching in the quadrangle and singing, as Smyth leaned out of a window conducting the song with a toothbrush.

In her book, Female Pipings in Eden, Smyth said her prison experience was of being "in good company" of united women "old, young, rich, poor, strong, delicate", putting the cause they were imprisoned for before their personal needs. Smyth revealed that the prison was infested with cockroaches, even in the hospital ward. She was released early, due to a medical assessment that she was mentally unstable and hysterical. Smyth gave written evidence in the November trial of Pankhurst and others for inciting violence, stating that she (Smyth) had freely engaged in activism. She continued to correspond with Pankhurst, and heard of her getting lost trying to find the safe house provided for her to avoid re-arrest in Scotland.

Smyth strongly disagreed with the support Pankhurst and her daughter Christabel gave to the war effort in 1914, but she did train as a radiographer in Paris. Her fractious friendship with Christabel ended in 1925, and Smyth conducted the Metropolitan Police Band at the unveiling of the statue to Pankhurst in London in 1930.

== Personal life ==
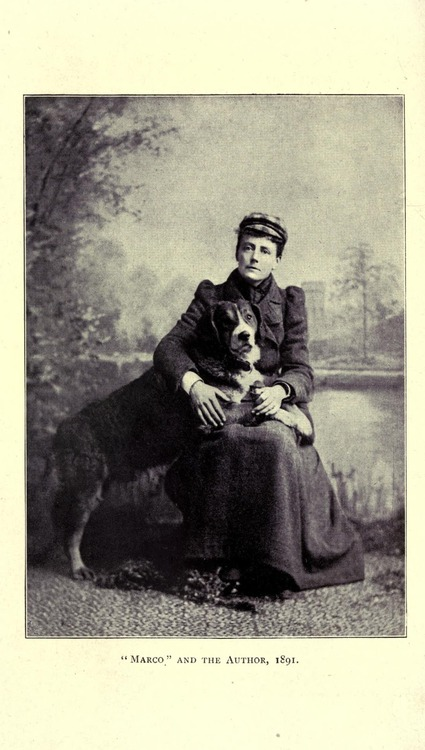
Smyth and her dog, Marco, 1891

While studying under Heinrich von Herzogenberg, Ethel met someone who would become a close friend and mentor: Heinrich’s wife, Elisabeth “Lisl” von Herzogenberg, the subject of Smyth’s unfinished musical character-portrait for solo piano, “Aus der Jugendzeit!! E. v. H.”. During their friendship, Lisl introduced her to the husband of her sister Julia, Henry Bennet Brewster (“H. B.”, “Harry”) who would become a published author of philosophy and the librettist of some of her operas. In her relationship with Henry, consisting in-part of many thousands of letters sent between the pair, a love triangle formed between the two of them and Harry’s wife, Julia.

According to Ethel, the marriage between Harry and Julia was, by design, flimsy and dissolvable, and thus Harry sought a harmonious dissolution of their union so that he may pursue a relationship with Ethel. It is clear that Harry supported this idea, and in letters written near the time of Julia’s death, he expressed a distaste for monogamy and frustration as to its insistence. It is likely, however, that Julia did not fully agree to this weakened matrimonial bond and thus resisted the attempts made by her husband for a mutual divorce, and when this drama became more public, it substantially harmed Ethel’s relationship with the Herzogenberg family. Ethel’s relationships with Lisl and Julia would notably not be restored before their deaths in 1892 and 1895 respectively. In contrast, however, she remained close to Harry up until his death in 1908. In 1884, at the height of this love triangle debacle, Ethel spoke about how the “best happiness” that she narrowly missed (regarding a relationship with Harry) significantly impacted her ability to write music, as she says that she composes best when she is happiest.

She would later be granted her wish when, after a time of low correspondence with Harry, and after the sudden death of Lisl in 1892, she decided that she would forsake her inhibitions and her concern for Julia (at some point Harry and Julia did dissolve their marriage, though it’s unclear when) and pursue a full relationship with Harry. This relationship would become central to her life and would inspire many of her creative works, though for a time (including the entire time before Lisl’s death), the pair abstained entirely from a sexual relationship, constraining it solely to sensual and romantic letters sent between the two. Ethel, herself, described how she did not feel the need for sexual pleasure because she felt that her musical career satisfied the same desire in a more dignified and self-controlled way. Over time, however, the letters sent between them suggested a heightened desire for a physical consummation of their relationship, and in 1895 they pursued a long-lasting unmarried sexual relationship vividly described in their many letters of correspondence.

Although Ethel had a serious physical relationship with Harry, she placed a higher emphasis on personal relationship when it comes to romance, and thus felt a closer kinship to women. She wrote to him in 1892: "I wonder why it is so much easier for me to love my own sex more passionately than yours. I can't make it out, for I am a very healthy-minded person", describing her inability to become emotionally attracted to nearly any man other than him. For this reason, and for the distaste for monogamy that they both seemed to share, during her relationship with Harry and after his death, Smyth had several passionate affairs, most of them with women. Smyth was at one time in love with the married suffragette Pankhurst. At the age of 71, she fell in love with writer Virginia Woolf – herself having worked in the women's suffrage movement – who, both alarmed and amused, said it was "like being caught by a giant crab", but the two became friends. Smyth's relationship with Violet Gordon-Woodhouse is depicted satirically in Roger Scruton's 2005 opera, Violet. Additionally, she met Willie Wilde, the brother of Oscar Wilde, during a trip to Ireland. They became engaged on the return railway journey from Holyhead to Euston, but she broke it off within three weeks.

In recognition of her work as a composer and writer, Smyth was made a Dame Commander of the Order of the British Empire (DBE) in 1922, becoming the first female composer to be awarded a damehood. Smyth received honorary doctorates in music from the universities of Durham and Oxford. She died in Woking in 1944 at the age of 86.

Smyth was actively involved in sport throughout her life. In her youth, she was a keen horse-rider and tennis player. She was a passionate golfer and a member of the ladies' section of Woking Golf Club, near where she lived. After she died and was cremated, her ashes were, as she had requested, scattered in the woods neighbouring the club by her brother Bob. Her musical executor was the composer and musicologist Kathleen Dale, a close neighbour.

== Representations and legacy ==
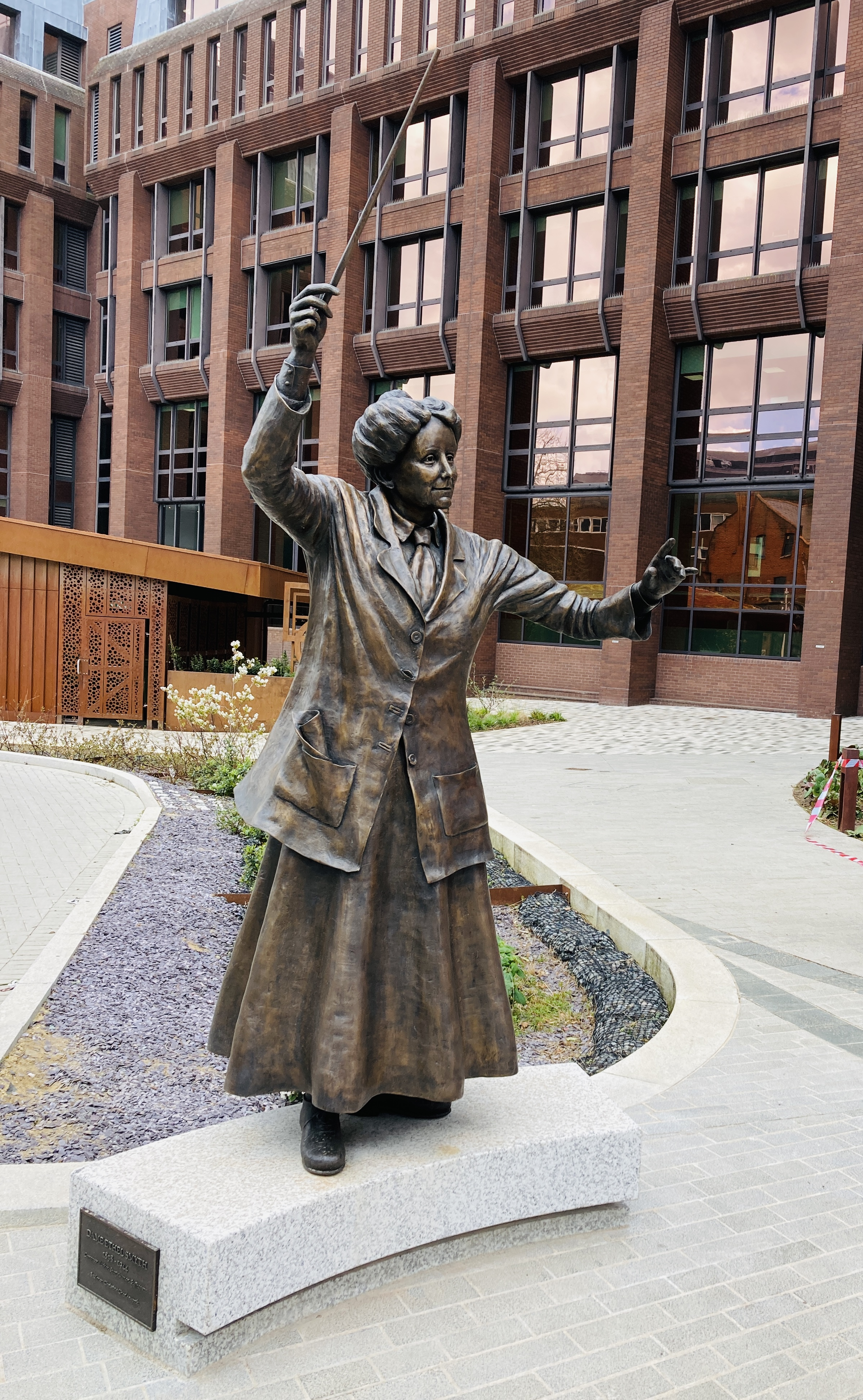
Statue of Smyth unveiled in Duke's Court Plaza, Woking, in 2022

Ethel Smyth featured, under the name of Edith Staines, in E. F. Benson's Dodo books (1893–1921), decades before the quaint musical characters of his more famous Mapp and Lucia series. She "gleefully acknowledged" the portrait, according to Prunella Scales. She was later a model for the fictional Dame Hilda Tablet in the 1950s radio plays of Henry Reed.

In "Recomposing Her History: The Memoirs and Diaries of Ethel Smyth" by Amanda Harris she speaks deeper on Smyth’s memoirs and how she resisted a male-dominated culture in the music world of the time. In these memoirs she also breaks away from the term “Lady Composer” pushing for a world of representation at a level of “composer amongst composers’.”

Smyth also addresses this dilemma in “Female Piping in Eden” where she speaks on how the female element of music is implicit to the male element establishing the importance of both and the need for more representation for women in the music world.

Both of these works play a crucial role in the commentary on societal and institutional changes that were needed and challenged in this era, and the role Smyth played in creating valuable insight not only through commentary but also through music that pushed her to a level of “composer amongst composers’.”

She was portrayed by Maureen Pryor in the 1974 BBC television film Shoulder to Shoulder.

Judy Chicago's monumental work of feminist art, The Dinner Party, features a place setting for Smyth.

Since 2018, the actress and singer, Lucy Stevens, has portrayed Ethel Smyth on stage at various venues in Britain.

In 2021, Smyth posthumously received a Grammy Award for Best Classical Vocal Solo based on the recording of The Prison by conductor James Blachly and soloists Sarah Brailey and Dashon Burton, members of Experiential Orchestra. Their rendition was released in August 2020 to coincide with the 100th anniversary of the Nineteenth Amendment, which gave women the right to vote in the United States.

In March 2022, in recognition of International Women's Day, a larger-than-size statue by Christine Charlesworth of Smyth conducting was unveiled in Duke's Court Plaza, Woking, by the Mayor of Woking, Cllr Liam Lyons, with invited guests who included members of Smyth's family as well as academics and councillors. Charlesworth described her sculpture as:

Ethel stands, wearing her usual tweed skirt, enthusiastically conducting passers-by with her over-sized baton, as presented to her at the Royal Albert Hall by Emeline Pankhurst.
Her jacket is half open, her arms are beating out the time and her eyes are full of concentration as she battles with her hearing loss, which went completely in her 50's.
Also detailed in her pocket is a sheaf of paper which could be ideas for a new opera, or maybe notes for a new book, as well as sketches and polemical essays.

== Literary works ==
=== Writings ===
- Impressions That Remained: Memoirs (1919) Vol. 1 · Vol. 2
- Streaks Of Life (1921)
- A Three-Legged Tour in Greece (March 24 – May 4, 1925) (1927)
- A Final Burning of Boats, etc. (1928)
- Female Pipings in Eden (1933)
- Beecham and Pharaoh (1935)
- As Time Went On ... (1936)
- Inordinate (?) Affection: A Story for Dog Lovers (1936)
- Maurice Baring (1938), a memoir of Maurice Baring
- What Happened Next (1940)
- The Memoirs of Ethel Smyth (1987), abridged and edited by Ronald Crichton. Available on 14-day loan at Archive.org (free registration required)

== Recordings ==
- The Boatswain's Mate. Nadine Benjamin, Rebecca Louise Dale, Edward Lee, Ted Schmitz, Jeremy Huw Williams, Simon Wilding, Mark Nathan, Lontano Ensemble, c. Odaline de la Martinez. Retrospect Opera RO001 (2016, two CDs).
- Cello Sonata in C minor. Friedemann Kupsa cello, Anna Silova piano; Lieder und Balladen, Opp. 3 & 4. Three Moods of the Sea. Maarten Koningsberger baritone, Kelvin Grout piano. TRO-CD 01417 (1997).
- Cello Sonata in A minor. Lionel Handy cello, Jennifer Hughes piano: Lyrita SRCD412 (2023).
- Complete Piano Works. Liana Șerbescu. CPO 999 327-2 (1995).
- Concerto for Violin, Horn and Orchestra. BBC Philharmonic, c. Odaline de la Martinez. Chandos Chan 9449 (1996).
- Double Concerto in A for violin, horn and piano. Renate Eggebrecht violin, Franz Draxinger horn, Céline Dutilly piano; Four Songs for mezzo-soprano and chamber ensemble (1907): Melinda Paulsen mezzo, Ethel Smyth ensemble; Three Songs for mezzo-soprano and piano (1913): Melinda Paulsen mezzo, Angela Gassenhuber piano. TRO-CD 01405 (1992).
- Entente Cordiale. Retrospect Opera fundraising campaign for future recording, 2024.
- Fete Galante: A Dance Dream. Charmian Bedford (soprano), Carolyn Dobbin (mezzo soprano), Mark Milhofer (tenor), Alessandro Fisher (tenor), Felix Kemp (baritone), Simon Wallfisch (baritone), Lontano Ensemble/Odaline de la Martinez. Retrospect Opera RO007 (2019).
- Mass in D, March of the Women, Scene from The Boatswain's Mate. Eiddwen Harrhy, The Plymouth Music Series, Philip Brunelle. Virgin Classics VC 7 91188-2 (1991).
- Mass in D. Philharmonia Chor Stuttgart, Württembergische Philharmonie Reutlingen, Helmut Wolf, LC 04480 (1997)
- Piano Trio in D minor. Neave Trio, Chandos CHAN20238 (2024)
- The Prison. Sarah Brailey, Dashon Burton, soloists; Experiential Orchestra and Chorus; James Blachly, Conductor. Steven Fox, Chorus Master, Blanton Alspaugh and Soundmirror, producer. Chandos Records (2020).
- Serenade in D major. BBC Philharmonic, c. Odaline de la Martinez. Chandos Chan 9449 (1996).
- Serenade in D major. On 'Lauter!', Ensemble reflektor. Solaire SOL1017 (2024).
- String Quartet in C minor. Maier Quartet. DB Productions, DBCD197 (2020).
- String Quartet in E minor, String Quintet in E Major, Op. 1. Mannheimer Streichquartett and Joachim Griesheimer. CPO 999 352-2 (1996).
- String Trio in D major. Trio d’Iroise. Solaire SOLD004 (2025)
- Suite for String Orchestra, Südwestdeutsches Kammerorchester Pforzheim, conducted by Douglas Bostock. CPO 555 457-2 (2022).
- Violin Sonata in A minor, Op. 7, Cello Sonata in A minor, Op. 5, String Quintet in E major, Op. 1, String Quartet in E minor. Renate Eggebrecht, violin, Friedemann Kupsa cello, Céline Dutilly piano, Fanny Mendelssohn Quartet. TRO-CD 01403 (2012, two CDs).
- Violin Sonata in A minor, Op. 7. Annette-Barbara Vogel, violin, Durval Cesetti, piano. Toccata TOCN0013 (2021).
- Der Wald. Natalya Romaniw, Claire Barnett-Jones, Robert Murray, Andrew Shore, Morgan Pearce, Matthew Brook; BBC Singers, BBC Symphony Orchestra, conducted by John Andrews (2023).
- The Wreckers. Anne-Marie Owens, Justin Lavender, Peter Sidhom, David Wilson-Johnson, Judith Howarth, Anthony Roden, Brian Bannatyne-Scott, Annemarie Sand. Huddersfield Choral Society, BBC Philharmonic, c. Odaline de la Martinez. Conifer Classics (1994). (Re-released in 2018 by Retrospect Opera, RO004).

== See also ==
- Norah Smyth, Ethel Smyth's niece, a notable suffragette
- List of suffragists and suffragettes
- List of Bloomsbury Group people
