= Dimitri Nicolau =

Greek-Italian composer, stage director, conductor, musicologist, writer and professor

- Born: 21 October 1946; Keratea, Greece
- Died: 29 March 2008 (aged 61) Rome, Italy
- Occupation: Composer

Dimitri Nicolau (21 October 1946 in Keratea, Greece - 29 March 2008 in Rome, Italy) was a composer, stage director, conductor, musicologist, writer and professor. He was born in Keratea, Greece and became a naturalized citizen of Italy. He began to compose and perform his compositions publicly in 1959. His catalogue today comprises more than 290 compositions- 5 symphonies, 10 string quartets, 3 lyric operas, chamber music, concerts, strassenmusik, vocal compositions, music for Plectra, sax music and cantatas.

He frequented the faculty of Modern Letters in Rome University. Fundamental for his artistic formation is the relationship with the theory and the Collective Analysis of Massimo Fagioli. He dedicated several years to didactic activity as a teacher of stage song, vocal theatrical technique and as a composer of original music at the Institute of Ancient Drama (INDA) of Syracuse, the Theatrical Academy of Calabria, the Theater Calabria, etc.

== Reviews ==
- Dimitri Nicolau with his composition "La melodia ritrovata" opus 41 (1975) it not only shows us to have a lot of new and original ideas but also to know how to write them. A really important composition of the recent years. The author succeeds in attracting the attention and the interest of the listener always maintaining an own independence and identity from schools, fashions of vanguard and taboo. Amfion - TA NEA 16 November 1985
- "Let us state, with joy, that D.Nicolau's chamber opera "Music Lesson" ( Lezione di musica opus 43) approaches perfection, musically and theatrically, at the same time ..." commented the italian musicologist on "l'Unità" E. Valente.
- "Nyctes" by D.Nicolau, 1st Prize of the II "S. Behrend" Competitions, immobilized us for almost half an hour, breathlessly. Timbre, sudden interruptions, melodies, intensities, all together made up a unified whole, with the instruments, without interruption. An [sic?] the end, a true explosion of the numerous public" comments the musicologist G. Hoffmann.
- in his music Dimitri Nicolau, surprisingly a prolific author uses with extreme skill the peculiar characteristics of every instrument (included the voice) and often with not ever usual executive techniques and always with great originality of timbrical combinations. Parallelly numerous compositions introduce an intense theatricality and inherent dramaturgy. Another fundamental element in its compositions is the particular one and always personal use of the Greek and Mediterranean area popular music: original inseparable melodies from a rich, varied and asymmetrical rhythm and above all an absolute originality in the harmonic tensions so much to be able to say and without fear of denial that really finds us of front to a real personal style, rare fact in the panorama of the music to us contemporary. Its search for the new one is always fruit of solid and deep knowledge of the instruments that uses is on the plan of the techniques that on the plan of the final emotional result (never with pretension or striving for effect or for exhibition) and ends up with works integrated, full of content, attractive, but also accessible, in spite of their originality, to the listener. A valuable precious element to the music of Nicolau–often missing in international contemporary music - is humor: light, playful, unobtrusive, sometimes dionysiac. This doesn't mean that Nicolau doesn't cultivate with depth, consistency and proper coherence the dramatic level, tragic and to ample breath her where it feels the demand. Jannis G. Papaioànnou
