= University of Music Franz Liszt Weimar =

Music school in Weimar, Germany

Coordinates: 50°58′42″N 11°19′54″E

Hochschule für Musik Franz Liszt Weimar
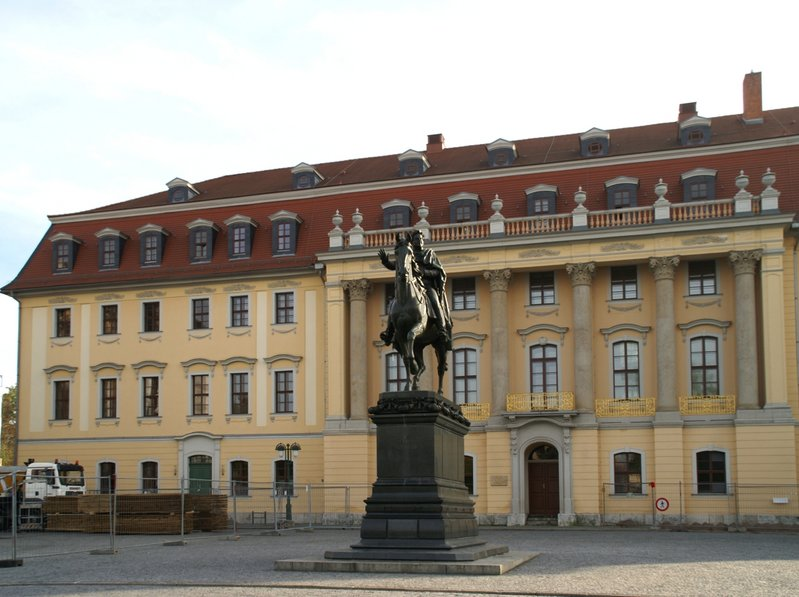
- Main building on Platz der Demokratie
- Type: Public
- Established: 1872
- President: Anne-Kathrin Lindig
- Students: 950
- Location: Weimar, Thüringen, Germany

The University of Music Franz Liszt Weimar (in German: Hochschule für Musik Franz Liszt Weimar) is an institution of music in Weimar, Germany.

== The Hochschule ==
Franz Liszt, who spent a great deal of his life in Weimar, encouraged the founding of a school in 1835 for the education of musicians in orchestral instruments. It was his student Carl Müllerhartung who realized Liszt's dream, founding the university on 24 June 1872.

=== Campus ===
The university is located in several different buildings in the centre of Weimar.

=== Courses ===
The university offers courses in all musical disciplines, including composition, conducting, jazz, musical theatre and pedagogy at undergraduate and postgraduate level.

== People ==
=== Some notable former students ===
- David Afkham (conductor)
- Justus Eichhorn (pianist)
- Marie Jacquot (conductor)
- Aljoša Jurinić (pianist)
- Andreas Bauer Kanabas (bass)
- Tatyana Ryzhkova (classical guitarist)
- Wolfgang Unger (choral conductor)
- Lorenzo Viotti (conductor)
- Ekkehard Wlaschiha (baritone)
- Sylke Zimpel (composer and choral conductor)

=== Some notable present and former staff ===
- Waldemar von Baußnern
- Ricardo Gallen
- Gunter Kahlert
- Erhard Mauersberger
- Dorothee Mields
- Robin Minard
- Michael Obst
- Nicolás Pasquet
- Jürgen Rost
- Monika Rost
- Manfred Schmitz
- Klaus Storck
- Richard Wetz

== See also ==
- Music schools in Germany
