= Wolfram Lorenzen =

German pianist (died 2020)

Wolfram Lorenzen (1951/1952 – 15 June 2020) was a German pianist.

== Biography ==
Wolfram Lorenzen was born in Freiburg im Breisgau, Baden-Württemberg, West Germany. He studied with Klaus Linder, Ludwig Hoffmann, Paul Badura-Skoda and participated in masterclasses held by Wilhelm Kempff, among others. He has won many important international music competitions (Monza, Vercelli, Senigalla a.o.).

In 1982 he was awarded first prize at the Sixth International Piano Competition in Montevideo, Uruguay. Since then, numerous concert tours have led him to all countries over the world.

He appeared with well-known orchestras and renowned conductors, performing seventy different piano concertos as well as an extensive solo repertoire and some four hundred chamber music works.

Wolfram Lorenzen was a regular guest in the broadcasting studios of German-speaking countries and regions as well as at many festivals.

He collaborated for many years with both the clarinetist Sabine Meyer and the flutist Peter-Lukas Graf. Together with the violinist Renate Eggebrecht and the Fanny Mendelssohn Quartet, Lorenzen recorded the Max Reger Chamber Music Edition on three CDs. In 1998 he presented the world premiere CD recording of the autograph fair copy of the piano cycle Das Jahr ("The Year") by Fanny Mendelssohn Hensel.

Two CD recordings with works by Robert Schumann and Clara Schumann were released in 2006 and 2010.

He died on 15 June 2020 at the age of 68.

== Recordings ==
- Robert Schumann, Faschingsschwank op. 26, Fantasiebilder op. 12, Symphonische Etüden op. 13, 2006. Abegg Variations op. 1, Novelettes op. 21, 2010.
- Clara Schumann, Sonata g-minor (1841), 2010
- Fanny Mendelssohn-Hensel, "Das Jahr", 12 Character Pieces for Fortepiano after the illustrated fair copy of 1842, Piano pieces in C major and A flat major, 1998
- Max Reger, Violin Sonata op. 72 (Renate Eggebrecht, violin), Piano Quintet op. 64, Piano Trio op. 102, Piano Quartets opp. 113 und 133 (Fanny Mendelssohn Quartet), 1996–98
- Max Reger, Concerto for Piano and Orchestra op. 114, Sinfonieorchester St. Gallen, Conductor Reinhard Petersen (1910)
- Max Reger, Sonatinas op. 89 no. 1 & 3 (1905-1908), Five Humoresques op. 20 (1898), Variations and Fugue on a Theme by Joh. Seb. Bach op. 81 (1904), 2010
- Béla Bartók, Rhapsody for Piano and Orchestra op. 1 (1904), Radio-Sinfonieorchester Stuttgart des SWR, Conductor Jiri Starek, 2010
- Felix Mendelssohn Bartholdy, Capriccio brillant for Piano and Orchestra op. 22 (1832), Radio-Sinfonieorchester Stuttgart des SWR, Conductor Ernest Bour, 2010
