= List of compositions by Ethel Smyth =

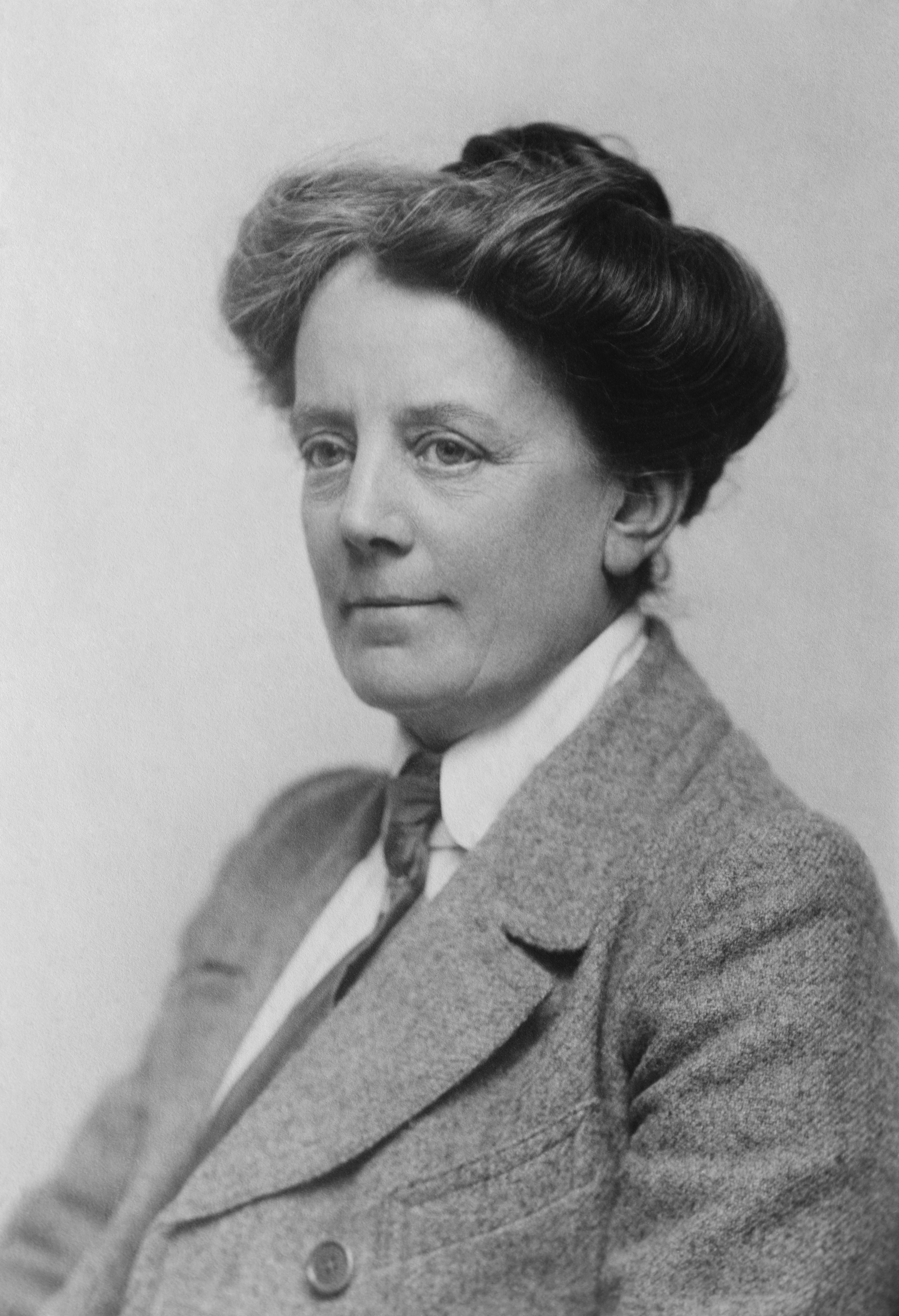
Ethel Smyth in 1922

This is a list of compositions by Ethel Smyth (1858–1944). Works are listed within each genre by year of composition, or if the year of composition is not known by year of publication or first performance. For operas and some other notable works the date and theatre of first performance is also given.

== Opera ==
- Fantasio (1892–94), comic opera in 2 acts by Henry Bennet Brewster and Smyth after Alfred de Musset (24 May 1898, Hoftheater, Weimar)
- Der Wald (1899–1901), opera in 1 act by Henry Brewster and Smyth (9 April 1902, Königliches Opernhaus, Berlin)
- The Wreckers (1902–04), opera in 3 acts by Henry Brewster and Smyth (11 November 1906, Neues Theater, Leipzig)
- The Boatswain's Mate (1913–14), comic opera in 1 act by Smyth after W. W. Jacobs (28 January 1916, Shaftesbury Theatre, London)
- Fête galante (1921–22), opera ("Dance-Dream") in 1 act by Smyth and Edward Shanks after Maurice Baring (4 June 1923, Birmingham Repertory Theatre)
- Entente cordiale (1923–24), comic opera in 1 act by Smyth (20 October 1926, Theatre Royal, Bristol)

== Ballet ==
- Fête galante (concert version 26 November 1932, Philharmonic Hall, Liverpool), adapted from the opera

== Choral ==
=== Religious ===
- Mass in D (1891) (18 January 1893, Royal Albert Hall)
- Five Sacred Part-Songs Based on Chorale Tunes (1882–84)
  1. "Komm, süßer Tod", on Bach's song
  2. "Kein Stündlein geht dahin"
  3. "Gib dich zufrieden und sei stille"
  4. "O Traurigkeit, o Herzeleid"
  5. "Erschienen ist der herrlich Tag", on the hymn by Nikolaus Herman
- The Song of Love, Op. 8 (1888), cantata by Smyth after the Song of Songs
- Wedding Anthem for choir and organ (c. 1900)

=== Secular ===
- We Watched her Breathing through the Night (1876), part song by Thomas Hood
- A Spring Canticle (or Wood Spirits' Song) for choir and orchestra (published 1903), re-arrangement from Der Wald
- Hey Nonny No for choir and orchestra (1910), anon.
- Sleepless Dreams for choir and orchestra (1910), by Dante Gabriel Rossetti
- Songs of Sunrise (1910)
  1. "Laggard Dawn" for choir, by Smyth
  2. "1910" for choir and optional orchestra, by Smyth
  3. "The March of the Women" for choir and optional orchestra, by Cicely Hamilton
- Dreamings (1920), part song by Patrick MacGill
- Soul's Joy (published 1923), madrigal by John Donne, re-arrangement from Fête galante
- The Prison (1929–30), cantata for soprano, bass, choir and orchestra, by Smyth after Henry Brewster (19 February 1931, Usher Hall, Edinburgh)

== Orchestral ==
- Overture to Shakespeare's Antony and Cleopatra (1889) (18 October 1890, The Crystal Palace, London)
- Serenade in D (1889) (26 April 1890, The Crystal Palace, London)
- Suite for Strings, Op. 1A (published 1891), re-arrangement from String Quintet in E, Op. 1
- On the Cliffs of Cornwall (first performed 1908), re-arrangement of prelude from The Wreckers
- Four Short Chorale Preludes for Strings and Solo Instruments (published c. 1913), re-arrangement of Short Chorale Preludes for organ
  1. "Du, o schönes Weltgebäude!"
  2. "O Traurigkeit, o Herzeleid"
  3. "Erschienen ist der herrlich Tag"
  4. "Schwing dich auf zu deinem Gott"
- Fête galante (first performed 1924), suite adapted from the opera
- Intermezzo (Mid Briars and Bushes) (first performed 1924), re-arrangement from The Boatswain's Mate
- Two Interlinked French Folk Melodies (published 1929), re-arrangement of intermezzo from Entente cordiale
- Two Orchestral Preludes (1929–30), re-arrangement from The Prison
- Entente cordiale (first performed 1925), suite adapted from the opera

== Concertante ==
- Concerto for violin and horn in A (1926)

== Chamber music ==
=== String quartets ===
- String Quartet No. 1 in A minor (1878), 1 movement
- String Quartet No. 2 in D minor (1880)
- String Quartet No. 3 in C minor (1881)
- String Quartet No. 4 in E♭ major (1882–84)
- String Quartet No. 5 in C major (1886–88)
- String Quartet No. 6 in E minor (1902–12)

=== String quintets ===
- String Quintet in B minor (1882–84), 2 movements (incomplete)
- String Quintet in E, Op. 1 for 2 violins, viola and 2 cellos (1883)

=== Trios ===
- Trio for violin, cello and piano in D minor (1880)
- String Trio in D (1887)
- Trio for violin, horn and piano in A (published 1928), re-arrangement from Concerto for violin and horn in A

=== Other ===
- Sonata for cello and piano in C minor (1880)
- Sonata for cello and piano in A minor, Op. 5 (1887)
- Sonata for violin and piano in A minor, Op. 7 (1887)
- Variations on Bonny Sweet Robin (Ophelia's Song) for flute, oboe and piano (1927)
- Two Interlinked French Folk Melodies for flute, oboe and piano, re-arrangement from intermezzo of Entente cordiale

== Piano ==
- Sonata No. 1 in C (1877)
- Sonata No. 2 (Geistinger) in C♯ minor (1877)
- Sonata No. 3 in D (1877), 2 movements
- Aus der Jugenzeit!! in E minor (1877–80)
- Four-part Dances (1877–80)
- Two-part Invention in D (1877–80)
- Two-part Suite in E (1877–80)
- Variations on an Original Theme (of an Exceedingly Dismal Nature) in D♭ (1878)
- Prelude and Fugue in C (1878–84)
- Prelude and Fugue in F♯ (1880)
- Prelude and Fugue for Thin People (c. 1883)
- Suite for piano four hands (published 1891), re-arrangement of Suite for Strings, Op. 1A
- The March of the Women (1914), re-arrangement of the song
- Canons (undated)

== Organ ==
- Fugue à 5 (1882–84)
- Short Chorale Preludes (1882–84)
  1. "Du, o schönes Weltgebäude!"
  2. "O Gott du frommer Gott"
  3. "Schwing dich auf zu deinem Gott"
  4. "Erschienen ist der herrlich Tag"
  5. Prelude and Fugue on "O Traurigkeit, o Herzeleid"
- Study on "O wie selig seid ihr doch, ihr Frommen" (1882–84)
- Prelude on a Traditional Irish Air (1938)

== Brass ==
- Hot Potatoes (1930), fanfare

== Songs ==
- Lieder und Balladen with piano, Op. 3 (c. 1877)
  1. "Vom Berge" anon.
  2. "Der verirrte Jäger" by Joseph Freiherr von Eichendorff
  3. "Bei einer Linde" by Joseph Freiherr von Eichendorff
  4. "Es wandelt was wir schauen" by Joseph Freiherr von Eichendorff
  5. "Schön Rohtraut" by Eduard Mörike
- Lieder with piano, Op. 4 (c. 1877)
  1. "Tanzlied" by Georg Büchner
  2. "Schlummerlied" by Ernst von Wildenbruch
  3. "Mittagsruh" by Joseph Freiherr von Eichendorff
  4. "Nachtreiter" by Klaus Groth
  5. "Nachtgedanken" by Paul Heyse
- Eight songs (c. 1877)
- Nine Rounds (1878–84)
- Four Songs with chamber ensemble (1907)
  1. "Odelette" by Henri de Régnier
  2. "La danse" by Henri de Régnier
  3. "Chrysilla" by Henri de Régnier
  4. "Ode anacréontique" by anon. translated Leconte de Lisle
- "The March of the Women" with optional piano (1910), by Cicely Hamilton
- Three Moods of the Sea with orchestra (1913), by Arthur Symons
  1. "Requies"
  2. "Before the Squall"
  3. "After Sunset"
- Three Songs (1913)
  1. "The Clown" with piano, by Maurice Baring
  2. "Possession" with piano, by Ethel Carnie Holdsworth
  3. "On the Road: a marching tune" with orchestra, by Ethel Carnie Holdsworth
