= Entente cordiale (disambiguation) =

The Entente cordiale was a set of agreements between France and the United Kingdom.

Entente cordiale may also refer to:

== Drama ==
- Entente cordiale (film), 1939 French film
- Entente cordiale, an episode of French TV drama Kaamelott
- Entente Cordiale, an episode of British radio sitcom Hut 33
- Entente Cordiale, an episode of British TV drama Bergerac
- Entente Cordiale, an episode of British TV drama Beryl's Lot
- Entente Cordiale, an episode of British TV drama Special Branch
- Entente Cordiale, an episode of British TV sitcom The Likely Lads

== Music ==
- Entente Cordiale (opera), opera by Ethel Smyth
- Entente cordiale, composition for piano and orchestra by Alexandre Rabinovitch-Barakovsky

== Transport ==
- Entente Cordiale, a French ship wrecked in 1917
- Entente Cordiale, trainset built for Regional Eurostar

== See also ==
- Entente Cordiale Scholarships
