= Mass in D (Smyth) =

- by Ethel Smyth
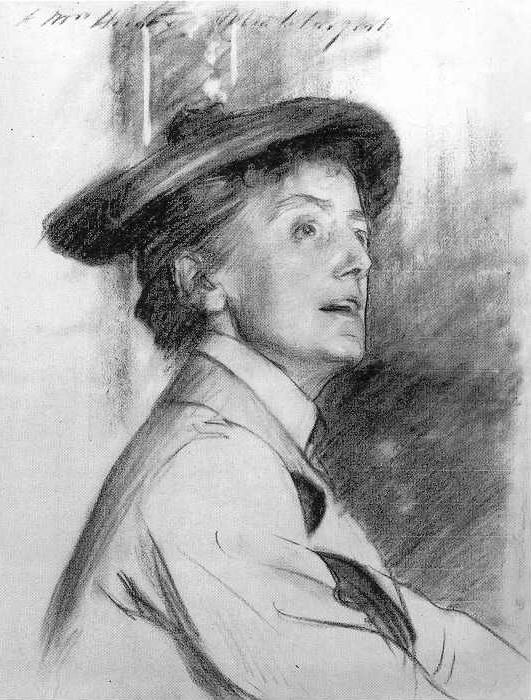
- Drawing of Ethel Smyth, singing and playing, by John Singer Sargent (1901)
- Text: mass ordinary
- Language: Latin
- Composed: 1891
- Performed: 18 January 1893: Royal Albert Hall
- Vocal: SATB choir and soloists
- Instrumental: orchestra

The Mass in D by Ethel Smyth is a setting of the mass ordinary for vocal soloists, choir and orchestra, first performed in 1893.

== Background ==
Smyth composed the Mass following a renewal of her High Anglican belief, stimulated by reading a copy of The Imitation of Christ, by Thomas à Kempis, while she was ill in Munich on Christmas Eve 1889. The book belonged to her Catholic friend Pauline Trevelyan, to whom Smyth dedicated the Mass. She composed much of it while a guest of Empress Eugénie at Cape Martin, near Monaco, in the summer of 1891.

Eugénie was also a friend of Queen Victoria. In October 1891, Smyth was staying with Eugénie on the estate of Balmoral Castle when the Queen paid a visit. Smyth gave a rendition at the piano of two movements of the Mass, and the Queen invited her to the castle where she gave another, longer rendition. Alfred, Duke of Edinburgh subsequently asked the Royal Choral Society to schedule the premiere. This took place on 18 January 1893 in the Royal Albert Hall, conducted by Joseph Barnby. The soloists were Esther Palliser, Belle Cole, Ben Davies and Robert Watkin-Mills.

The reception in the Albert Hall was enthusiastic, as were some reviews: J. A. Fuller Maitland praised the work's structure and rich orchestration. George Bernard Shaw wrote that the Mass was a sign of the rise of woman composers, though he called the work "the light literature of church music". Smyth was stung by what she saw as the patronising attitude of many reviewers towards a female composer.

After composing the Mass, her religious belief faded. She turned to opera, following the advice of conductor Hermann Levi, who praised her aptitude for dramatic composition when she showed him the Mass in Munich. After composing her first opera, Fantasio, she travelled around Europe during the mid-1890s seeking to arrange a premiere for it, and also a further performance of the Mass. In fact, the Mass was not performed again anywhere until 1924. Smyth blamed this on prejudice against female composers.

== Revivals ==
=== England ===
The Mass was revived on 7 February 1924 by the Birmingham Festival Choral Society, conducted by Adrian Boult. Its success prompted the arrangement of another performance on 8 March 1924 at Queen's Hall in London. George Bernard Shaw now thought the Mass "magnificent". In the years following, it was performed a number of times. In 1934 a performance of the Mass conducted by Thomas Beecham, attended by Queen Mary, was the culmination of the Festival Concerts celebrating Smyth's 75th birthday.

==== Modern English Revivals ====
After the U.S. premiere in 1980, there were then several UK performances, including one at Charterhouse School Chapel, a BBC broadcast in December 1985, and a 1993 performance at the Queen Elizabeth Hall conducted by Odaline de la Martinez.

In 2018 there was a performance at the Three Choirs Festival in Hereford Cathedral. A new recording by the BBC Symphony Orchestra, BBC Symphony Chorus and soloists conducted by Sakari Oramo was released in 2019, followed in 2022 by a live performance from the same performers at the BBC Proms - a concert billed as 'the first Proms performance since the composer's own lifetime'.

=== United States ===
The Mass received its United States premiere in a performance in Minneapolis conducted by Philip Brunelle on 4 May 1980, sparking a modern revival. Brunelle subsequently recorded the work. Its U.S. East Coast premiere came in a performance on 23 January 1993 by the Monmouth Civic Chorus conducted by Mark Shapiro, and its New York City premiere in Carnegie Hall on 14 April 2013 in a performance by The Cecilia Chorus of New York, again conducted by Shapiro. The Cathedral Choral Society and Baltimore Symphony Orchestra under the baton of Steven Fox performed the Washington D.C. premiere of Smyth's Mass in D on March 16, 2025 at the National Cathedral.

=== Australia ===
The Mass in D Australian premiere was performed on the 9th of October 2022, by the Camberwell Chorale, conducted by Douglas Heywood OAM.

== Structure ==
=== Instrumentation ===
Smyth's Mass in D Major is scored for 2 flutes, 2 oboes, 2 clarinets, 2 bassoons, contrabassoon, 4 horns, 2 trumpets, 3 trombones, bass tuba, timpani, percussion, organ, and strings. Her manuscript calls for "strings as usual," by which she means parts for first and second violins, violas, cellos, and basses.

The work is divided into six parts.

This was the concert order in 1893 and 1924. Although the score was printed with the movements ordered as in Catholic liturgy, with the Gloria coming second, it included a note stating Smyth's preference for the Gloria to be performed last. Anglican services of the time had the Gloria at the end, but Smyth later wrote that her only reason for it was to finish triumphantly. According to musicologist Donald Tovey, the joyful mood sustained in the Gloria is an example of the close attention which Smyth paid to matching the music to the religious meaning of every part of each movement's text.

The Mass remains almost entirely in D minor or D major throughout.

=== Kyrie ===
The Kyrie starts with the bass section entering softly, joined successively by the other sections, and builds to a choral climax, which then subsides.

=== Credo ===
Chorus and orchestra also dominate in the Credo, with a fugal "Crucifixus", short fugal sections at "Dominum et vivificantem", and ending with a fugal "et vitam venturi".

=== Sanctus ===
The Sanctus starts with alto solo, joined by the soprano and alto sections, who continue in the lyrical "pleni sunt coeli", leading into a climax, with an eight-part chorus for the "Hosanna".

=== Benedictus ===
The Benedictus, for soprano solo and the soprano and alto sections, is soaring and melodious. There is a contrapuntal theme for cor anglais, and a trumpet joins the solo at the "Hosanna".

=== Agnus Dei ===
The Agnus Dei is for tenor solo and chorus.

=== Gloria ===
The Gloria starts with an orchestral outburst and then a change in time signature at "et in terra pax", where what Tovey calls a "radiant melody" is taken up first by the tenor solo and then by the other parts. This is succeeded by a number of further themes.
