= David Randolph =

- Born: David Rosenberg; December 21, 1914; Manhattan, New York City, New York, United States
- Died: May 12, 2010 (aged 95)
- Occupations: Conductor, Music educator, Radio host

David Randolph (December 21, 1914 – May 12, 2010) was an American conductor, music educator and radio host. He is best known as the music director from 1965 through 2010 of the St. Cecilia Chorus (known now as The Cecilia Chorus of New York) and as the host of Music for the Connoisseur, later known as The David Randolph Concerts, a WNYC classical music radio program nationally syndicated in the United States.

The author and neurologist Oliver Sacks wrote of him:

His passion for the every aspect of the music was evident. He often gave historical glosses on a particular instrument or musical theme, and he never omitted to say that Handel drew much of his most beloved “religious” music from the bawdy Italian love songs of his time. There was no such thing as “religious” music, Randolph felt, any more than there was “military” music or “love” music; there was only music put to different uses, in different contexts. This was a point which he brought out with great eloquence in his beautiful book, This Is Music: A Guide to the Pleasure of Listening, and he would often mention it before a performance of his annual Christmas Oratorio or the great Passions he conducted at Easter. He would mention it, too, when conducting his favorite Requiem Masses by Brahms, Verdi, or Berlioz—all of whom, he would remind the audience, were atheists (as he himself was). The religious imagination, he felt, was a most precious part of the human spirit, but he was convinced that it did not require particular religious beliefs, or indeed any religious belief.

== Biography ==
David Randolph was born David Rosenberg in Manhattan on December 21, 1914 to Morris Rosenberg and Elsie Goodman. He changed his surname to Randolph after graduating from high school.

== Links ==
As part of its regular efforts to document living treasures of the New York performing arts community, the Rodgers and Hammerstein Archives of the New York Public Library recorded a 100-minute video oral history interview with the 95-year David Randolph (in conversation with Gerald Greland) on March 25, 2010, which would turn out to be his final interview before he succumbed to illness. The Library's Rodgers and Hammerstein Archives of Recorded Sound houses a collection of sound recordings of Mr. Randolph with the St. Cecilia Chorus; and the Library also contains an archive of his papers.
