= Robert Watkin-Mills =

Robert Watkin-Mills in about 1905

Robert Watkin-Mills (March 4, 1849 – December 10, 1930) was an English bass-baritone concert singer of the late Victorian era who in his later career moved to Canada. An early recording artist, he recorded selections from the works of Schumann, Handel, Wagner, Gounod and Mendelssohn for Pathé Records (1903) and Odeon Records (1907-8).

== Early life and career ==
Born in Painswick in Gloucestershire, he was the son of Mary Watkins (born 1817) and Thomas Mills (1819 – 1883). In 1869 he married Elizabeth Hore (1850-after 1891). Robert Watkin-Mills studied singing with Samuel Sebastian Wesley in Gloucestershire, Edwin Holland in London, and Federico Blasco in Milan. He made his professional singing debut at The Crystal Palace in May 1884 in a concert with Sims Reeves. In 1886, he sang the role of the Forester in the premiere of Arthur Sullivan's cantata The Golden Legend at the triennial Leeds Festival. He also sang in the 1893 premiere of Ethel Smyth's Mass in D at the Royal Albert Hall. He had a successful career in Great Britain, the United States (he returned almost every year from 1894), and in Australia from 1904 to 1905. In Canada he appeared with the Montreal Philharmonic Society and other musical societies, specialising in the concert platform and in oratorio, especially in such works as Handel's Messiah and Judas Maccabaeus.

Robert Watkin-Mills in 1895

He sang in The Proms every year from 1895 to 1898 in works including Die Meistersinger von Nürnberg, Tannhäuser, and Acis and Galatea. In November 1900, Henry Wood engaged him for his uncut performance at Nottingham of the first two acts of Tannhäuser (introducing the Paris version of the Venusberg scene for the first time in England), along with Robert Radford and others.

== Move to Canada ==
In 1914 Watkin-Mills moved permanently to Winnipeg in Canada where he became choirmaster of the Broadway Methodist Church and helped set-up the Men's Music Club, of which he was President from 1917 to 1919. He married Elsie Cantell, a singer and organist, in 1919, and in 1922 the couple moved to Toronto where they opened a vocal studio and were appointed choirmaster and organist of Knox Church.

Watkin-Mills made his final appearance on the concert platform aged 77 in Handel's Messiah at St Paul's Church in Toronto. On his death in December 1930 The Musical Times said of him, "Though his name does not ring in history and reminiscence as do those of a few of his contemporaries, he was a full member of that band of oratorio singers who were the pride of musical England in the Victorian age." He was buried in Mount Pleasant Cemetery in Toronto, where his students paid for his memorial.

On brief returns to England, Watkin-Mills made records for Pathé Records (1903) and Odeon Records (1907-8), including works by Schumann, Handel, Wagner, Gounod and Mendelssohn.
