= Monmouth Civic Chorus =

Community chorus in Monmouth County, New Jersey

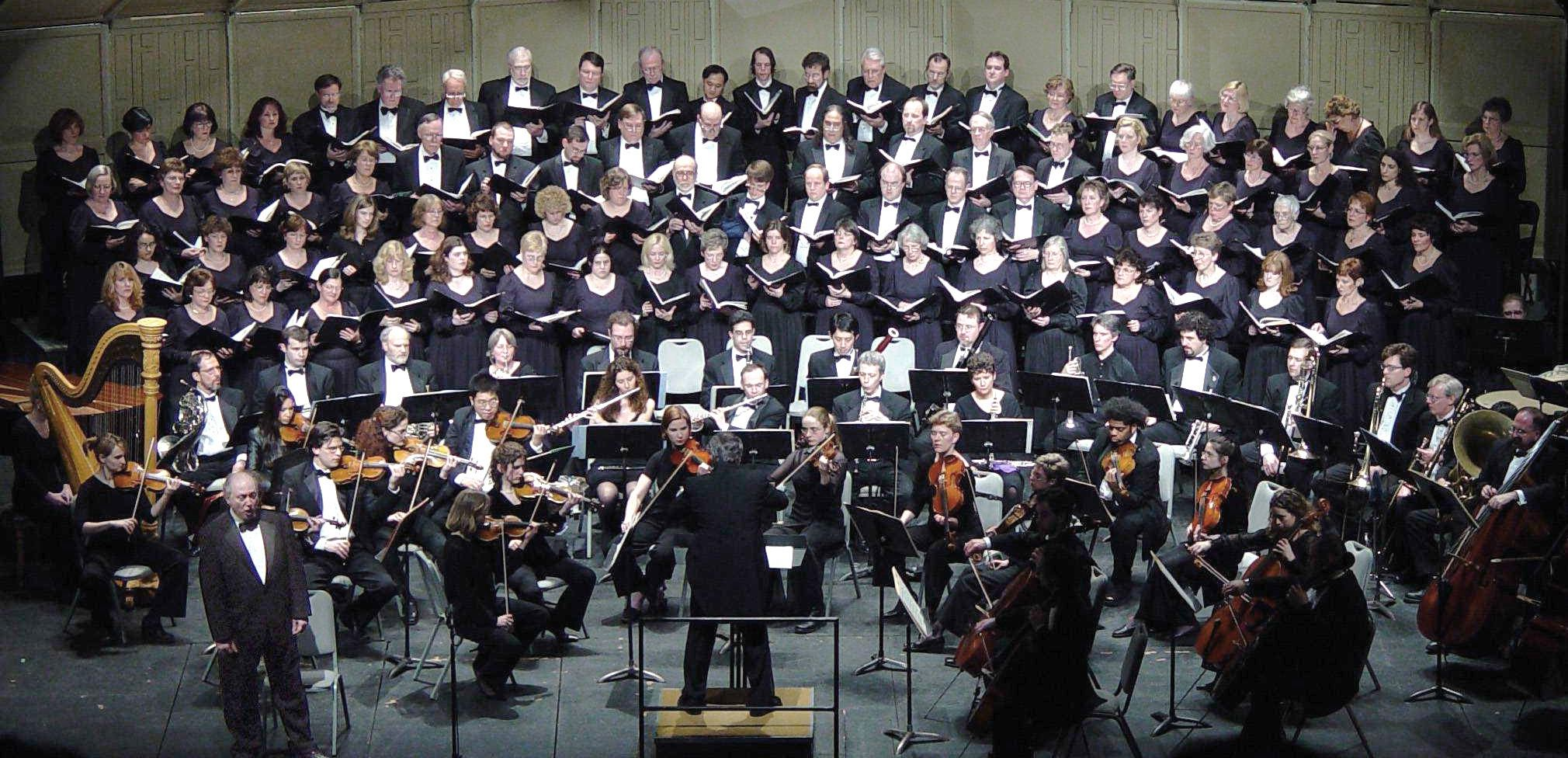
Monmouth Civic Chorus in concert at the Count Basie Center for the Arts, Red Bank, New Jersey (2003)

Monmouth Civic Chorus is a community chorus in Monmouth County, New Jersey, USA. Monmouth Civic Chorus was established in 1949 and draws its members primarily from the Monmouth County community. Its performances encompass choral classics, premieres, rare and contemporary music, musical theater, opera, and operetta. Monmouth Civic Chorus has performed on tour in Europe and the Mid-Atlantic region of the United States.

In addition to concerts, Monmouth Civic Chorus offers community outreach performances and awards vocal scholarships to high school seniors of outstanding vocal promise.

== History ==
William Gordon Pagdin founded Monmouth Civic Chorus in 1949. The Gilbert and Sullivan operetta The Pirates of Penzance was the Chorus's first performance in May 1950 at the Carlton Theater (now the Count Basie Center for the Arts) in Red Bank, New Jersey.

Monmouth Civic Chorus's second performance, in January 1951 was Messiah (Handel). Monmouth Civic Chorus continued to perform Gilbert and Sullivan as well as sacred works under the direction of its founder until 1962.

Felix Molzer became Monmouth Civic Chorus director in 1962, the same year he founded the Monmouth Conservatory of Music. In his native Vienna, he sang in the Vienna Boys' Choir as a child and became its director. He added to the Monmouth Civic Chorus operetta repertoire and expanded its concert performances to new stages, among them the then-Garden State Arts Center with the New Jersey Symphony Orchestra conducted by Henry Lewis.

William R. Shoppell, Jr. became Monmouth Civic Chorus's director in 1973. Shoppell was also District Music Supervisor for the Freehold Regional High School District, cantor at Monmouth Reform Temple, and Director of Music at Point Pleasant Presbyterian Church. Under his direction the Monmouth Civic Chorus performance schedule grew from a classical concert in the fall and a staged musical in the spring to three concerts plus a stage show. In addition to Gilbert and Sullivan, the stage repertoire expanded to include American musical theater.

Monmouth Civic Chorus began touring out of state under Shoppell's direction in 1981, which led to a performing tour of Austria and Germany in 1984. European tours were continued under subsequent directors.

Upon Shoppell's retirement in 1991, Dr. Mark Shapiro was appointed artistic director. Under his direction, Monmouth Civic Chorus recorded two CDs, increased its repertoire of new music and premieres, and performed original concert presentations of traditional music. Monmouth Civic Chorus received the ASCAP/Chorus America Alice Parker Award for the March 2007 world premiere of contemporary composer Jorge Martin's Stronger Than Darkness, an adaptation of his opera Before Night Falls, based on the memoir by Cuban dissident Reinaldo Arenas.

Dr. Ryan James Brandau was appointed Monmouth Civic Chorus artistic director beginning with the 2012-13 season, upon the departure of Dr. Shapiro, who became the music director of The Cecilia Chorus of New York. Dr. Brandau's arrangements are featured in the Monmouth Civic Chorus holiday concert performed annually in December, and on its CD, A Merry Little MCC Christmas, released in 2014. Dr. Brandau prepared Monmouth Civic Chorus for a performance of Mahler's 8th Symphony by invitation at Carnegie Hall with the Canterbury Choral Society in November 2017.

Kevin Vondrak was appointed artistic director beginning with the 2026-27 season, after Dr. Brandau's departure. Vondrak is also the associate conductor of The Crossing, based in Philadelphia.

== Repertoire ==
The repertoire since 1992 is listed on the chorus' website.

== Premieres ==
Monmouth Civic Chorus has performed regional and world premieres, including:

- Bound for Glory by Rollo Dillworth, with the Canterbury Choral Society, November 2017, world premiere at Carnegie Hall
- Brooklyn Bones by Alvin Singleton, text by Patricia Hampl, and The Wallabout Martyrs by Gilda Lyons, text by Walt Whitman; March 2011, world premieres
- Golden Gate, a contemporary musical by Richard Pearson Thomas and Joe Calarco, May 2008, world premiere of semi-staged version
- I Sing the Body Electric by Brooklyn-based composer and conductor Vince Peterson, April 2010, dedicated to Dr. Mark Shapiro
- Sécheresses (Droughts) by Francis Poulenc, June 2003, world premiere of English translation by Dr. Mark Shapiro
- Sphaera (Bubble) by French composer Guillaume Connesson, May 2009, North American premiere
- Stronger Than Darkness, a Cuban-American concert opera by Jorge Martin, March 2007, world premiere of concert version

== Original Presentations and Commissions ==
Monmouth Civic Chorus has performed original concert presentations and commissioned works, including:

- A Song Together by Ryan James Brandau, commissioned in honor of Monmouth Civic Chorus's 75th anniversary, March 2024
- Vespers Fusion concert, May 2015, integrating selections from Monteverdi's Vespro della Beata Vergine and Mozart's Vesperae solemnes de confessore (Mozart) into one performance
- I Have a Dream concert, March 2013, honoring the 50th anniversary of Dr. Martin Luther King, Jr.'s iconic speech, and the 150th anniversary of the Emancipation Proclamation, through music, historical readings, and dramatic re-enactment
- Lincoln Bicentennial Tribute concert, February 2009, featuring songs, narrative, skits, and quotes by Abraham Lincoln
- Concert portraits of the lives and works of great artists, with dramatic skits and readings, including William Shakespeare, Johann Sebastian Bach, Johannes Brahms, and Franz Liszt
- Fill My Dreams, Stir My Soul by Paul Siskind, June 2001, based on Monmouth Civic Chorus's student poetry contests with the winning poems set to music and performed by Monmouth Civic Chorus, supported a grant from the Geraldine R. Dodge Foundation
- Annual holiday concerts in December, combining traditional music, new arrangements of well-known carols by Dr. Brandau and other contemporary composers, selections from choral classics, and poetry readings

Monmouth Civic Chorus commissioned Artistic Director Dr. Ryan James Brandau to compose a new work in honor of the Chorus's 75th anniversary. The work will be performed in March 2024.

== Rare and Contemporary Music ==
Rare and contemporary music performed by Monmouth Civic Chorus includes:

- Mark Adamo, No. 10: The Supreme Virtue
- Dominick Argento, Peter Quince at the Clavier and Jonah and the Whale
- Samuel Barber, Prayers of Kierkegaard
- John Corigliano, Fern Hill
- Ēriks Ešenvalds, Only In Sleep, Stars
- Ola Gjeilo, Luminous Night of the Soul
- Leoš Janáček, Otcenas (Our Father)
- Ulysses Kay, Song of Jeremiah
- Trond Kverno, Missa in Sono Tubae (Mass with the Sound of Brass)
- Morten Lauridsen, Lux Aeterna (Eternal Light), O Magnum Mysterium and Dirait-on
- Franz Liszt, A Munka Hymnusza (Workers' Chorus)
- Zdeněk Lukáš, Requiem
- Kirke Mechem, Las Americas Unidas (The United Americas)
- Peter Mennin, Symphony No. 4, The Cycle
- Paul Moravec, Songs of Love and War
- Carl Nielsen, Springtime on Funen
- Tarik O'Regan, Triptych
- Vincent Persichetti, Mass
- Rosephanye Powell, Non Nobis, Domine and The Cry of Jeremiah
- Roger Sessions, Mass
- Dame Ethel Smyth, Mass in D
- Igor Stravinsky, Les Noces (The Wedding)
- Brandon Waddles, Ride Up in the Chariot

== Musical theater ==
- Fully staged performances of musical theater classics by Gilbert and Sullivan, Frank Loesser, Rodgers and Hammerstein, Lerner and Loewe, and George Gershwin & Ira Gershwin
- Golden Gate, book by Joe Calarco, music by Richard Pearson Thomas, May 2008
- Ragtime, book by Terrence McNally, lyrics by Lynn Ahrens, music by Stephen Flaherty, October 2009
- Titanic, book by Peter Stone, lyrics by Maury Yeston, October 2011
- Leonard Bernstein centennial performance, April 2018, semi-staged selections from Candide, Mass, On the Town, and West Side Story
- Original musical revues sampling a variety of composers, such as American Folk, May 2010, and American Songbook, March 2014

== Opera and operetta ==
- Goyescas by Enrique Granados
- The Bartered Bride by Bedrich Smetana
- The Magic Flute by Wolfgang Amadeus Mozart
- The Merry Widow by Franz Lehar
- Turandot by Giacomo Puccini
- Stronger Than Darkness by Jorge Martin, March 2007, world premiere of concert version of his opera Before Night Falls

== Choral Classics ==
Among the choral classics performed by Monmouth Civic Chorus are:

- Johann Sebastian Bach, Christmas Oratorio, Magnificat, Mass in B Minor, St. Matthew Passion
- Ludwig van Beethoven, Choral Fantasy, Mass in C, Missa Solemnis, Ode to Joy
- Hector Berlioz, Requiem
- Leonard Bernstein, Chichester Psalms
- Ernest Bloch, Sacred Service
- Johannes Brahms, Alto Rhapsody, Ein Deutsches Requiem (A German Requiem)
- Anton Bruckner, Mass in E Minor, Mass in F Minor, Te Deum
- Maurice Duruflé, Requiem
- Antonín Dvořák, Stabat Mater, Te Deum
- Gabriel Fauré, Cantique de Jean Racine, Requiem
- George Frideric Handel, Israel in Egypt, Judas Maccabeus, Messiah
- Joseph Haydn, The Creation, Mass in D Minor (Lord Nelson Mass) at Saint Thomas Church (Manhattan), Missa Cellensis, The Seasons
- Zoltán Kodály, Missa Brevis
- Gustav Mahler, Symphony No. 8 (Symphony of a Thousand), at Carnegie Hall
- Felix Mendelssohn, Elijah
- Wolfgang Amadeus Mozart, Coronation Mass, Grand Mass in C Minor, Missa Brevis (Sparrow Mass) at Saint Thomas Church (Manhattan), Requiem, Te Deum, Solemn Vespers
- Carl Orff, Carmina Burana
- Francis Poulenc, Gloria, Mass in G, Stabat Mater
- Giacomo Puccini, Messa di Gloria, at the Basilica of the National Shrine of the Immaculate Conception, Washington, DC
- Sergei Rachmaninoff, Vespers (All-Night Vigil)
- Gioachino Rossini, Stabat Mater
- John Rutter, Gloria, Requiem at Carnegie Hall
- Franz Schubert, Mass in A Flat, Mass in E Flat, Mass in G
- Ralph Vaughan Williams, Dona Nobis Pacem, Hodie, Sea Symphony
- Giuseppe Verdi, Four Sacred Pieces, Requiem
- Antonio Vivaldi, Gloria
- William Walton, Belshazzar's Feast

== Guest artists ==
Guest artists featured in Monmouth Civic Chorus concerts and solo recitals include mezzo-soprano Sasha Cooke, mezzo-soprano Barbara Dever, bass-baritone Ryan Speedo Green, and soprano Angela Meade, who have all performed leading roles at the Metropolitan Opera. Eric Einhorn, a director at the Metropolitan Opera and many other stages, directed Monmouth Civic Chorus in the premiere of Golden Gate, a musical by Richard Pearson Thomas and Joe Calarco. Tony winner Victoria Clark led a master class for musical theater singers to benefit Monmouth Civic Chorus in 2009.

== Collaborative performances ==
Monmouth Civic Chorus has collaborated with orchestras, choruses, musical theater companies, and dance companies, including:

- Cabaret for Life, Ragtime by Stephen Flaherty and Lynn Ahrens, October 2009; Titanic by Maury Yeston and Peter Stone, October 2011; Leonard Bernstein Centennial April 2017; at Axelrod Performing Arts Center, Deal, NJ
- Canterbury Choral Society, Symphony #8 by Gustav Mahler, November 2017, at Carnegie Hall, New York, NY
- Cathedral Symphony Orchestra, December 1985, at the Cathedral Basilica of the Sacred Heart, Newark, NJ
- Manhattan Philharmonic, May 1989, November 1990 and May 1991, at Carnegie Hall
- Monmouth Conservatory of Music Children's Opera Chorus, April 1997 and June 2000
- Monmouth Symphony Orchestra, March 1994
- New Jersey Bach Festival Orchestra, December 1993, Messiah by Georg Frederic Handel, at the Cathedral Basilica of the Sacred Heart, Newark, NJ
- New Jersey Chamber Singers Children's Chorus, June 2001
- New Jersey Gay Men's Chorus, December 2007
- New Jersey Symphony Orchestra, November 2001, at the New Jersey Performing Arts Center, Newark, NJ
- New Jersey Youth Chorus, December 2017
- Raritan Valley Youth Chorale, June 1994
- Roxey Ballet, Carmina Burana: A Scenic Cantata by Carl Orff, April 2019, at Axelrod Performing Arts Center
- Westfield Symphony Orchestra (now New Jersey Festival Orchestra), Nai-Ni Chen Dance Company, and New York City Opera, Turandot by Giacomo Puccini, September 2006, at the Garden State Arts Center (now PNC Bank Arts Center), Holmdel, NJ

== Awards ==
Monmouth Civic Chorus has received the following awards:

- 2020-21 American Prize in Virtual Performance for Artists Performing Remotely, Community Division, Semi-Finalist
- 2018-19 American Prize Ernst Bacon Memorial Award for the Performance of American Music, Community Choral Division, tied for third place, for Fern Hill by John Corigliano, March 2018 at Our Lady Star of the Sea, Long Branch, NJ, with guest soloist Kate Maroney, mezzo-soprano
- 2010 Spinnaker Award for Arts and Culture from the Eastern Monmouth Area Chamber of Commerce
- 2008 ASCAP/Chorus America Adventurous Programming Award, awarded to one North American chorus annually for programming significant recently composed music that expands the mission of the chorus and challenges the chorus's audience in a new way.

Monmouth Civic Chorus Artistic Directors have also received awards:

- Artistic Director Ryan James Brandau won multiple American Prize awards: Winner, 2021 American Prize in Choral Performance, Community Division; Winner, 2021 Ernst Bacon Memorial Award for the Performance of American Music, Community Ensemble Division; and 3rd Place, 2021 American Prize for Choral Conducting, Community Chorus Division. He received the Monmouth Arts 2021 Education Award for Community Champion of the Arts.
- Artistic Director Emeritus Mark Shapiro won a Chorus America/ASCAP Programming Award six times: the Alice Parker Award with Monmouth Civic Chorus in 2008 and Cecilia Chorus in 2015, and the Adventurous Programming Award with Cantori New York in 1997, 2000, 2010, and 2018.

== Recordings ==
Monmouth Civic Chorus has produced three recordings on CD:

- A Merry Little MCC Christmas, released November 2014
- An MCC Christmas, well-known holiday carols (sold out)
- Grace Notes, selections from choral classics

== Community outreach and scholarships ==
Small ensembles of Monmouth Civic Chorus members perform at senior communities, private parties, and local events such as Red Bank Holiday Harmonies and Belmar Winterfest. Since 1985, Monmouth Civic Chorus has awarded more than $85,000 to over 110 New Jersey high school seniors of outstanding vocal promise. Many winners go on to study music and some have returned to sing with the chorus.

== Tours ==
Monmouth Civic Chorus has performed on tour in numerous European countries. Highlights include singing in St. Peter's Basilica at the Vatican in Rome, the Duomo di Santa Maria del Fiori in Florence, St. Stephen's Cathedral in Vienna, the home of Edvard Grieg in Norway, and St. Patrick's Cathedral in Dublin. Tours under the direction of William R. Shoppell, Jr. took Monmouth Civic Chorus to Austria and Germany in 1984, the British Isles in 1987, and to Austria, Switzerland and Italy in 1990. Monmouth Civic Chorus toured Central Europe in 1993, directed by Dr. Shapiro, and Scandinavia in 1996, under the baton of then-Assistant Conductor Steven Russell. Dr. Brandau led the chorus on tours of the Republic of Ireland in 2015, the Baltic States in 2018, and of Northern Italy and Austria in 2023.

== Organizational structure ==
Monmouth Civic Chorus is an auditioned volunteer adult mixed chorus of approximately 100 members. Monmouth Civic Chorus is a not-for-profit organization with no office and no paid administrative staff. All administrative aspects of running the chorus are performed by volunteers. The elected board of directors, consisting largely of singing members, is responsible for developing and implementing the long-range plan, overseeing the group's fiscal health and grant compliance, responding to the needs of the director and members, and maintaining productive relationships with the audience and community.

Monmouth Civic Chorus programs are made possible in part by funds from Monmouth Arts, a partner agency of the New Jersey State Council on the Arts, and the Monmouth County Board of County Commissioners. Additional funding is received from individual and corporate donors, foundation grants and matching gifts. Monmouth Civic Chorus has an Endowment Fund as a permanent income source, and a Sostenuto Society for donors who have included the chorus in their estate planning.

Monmouth Civic Chorus is a member of Chorus America and the New Jersey Choral Consortium.
