= The March of the Women =

Song, UK women's suffrage anthem

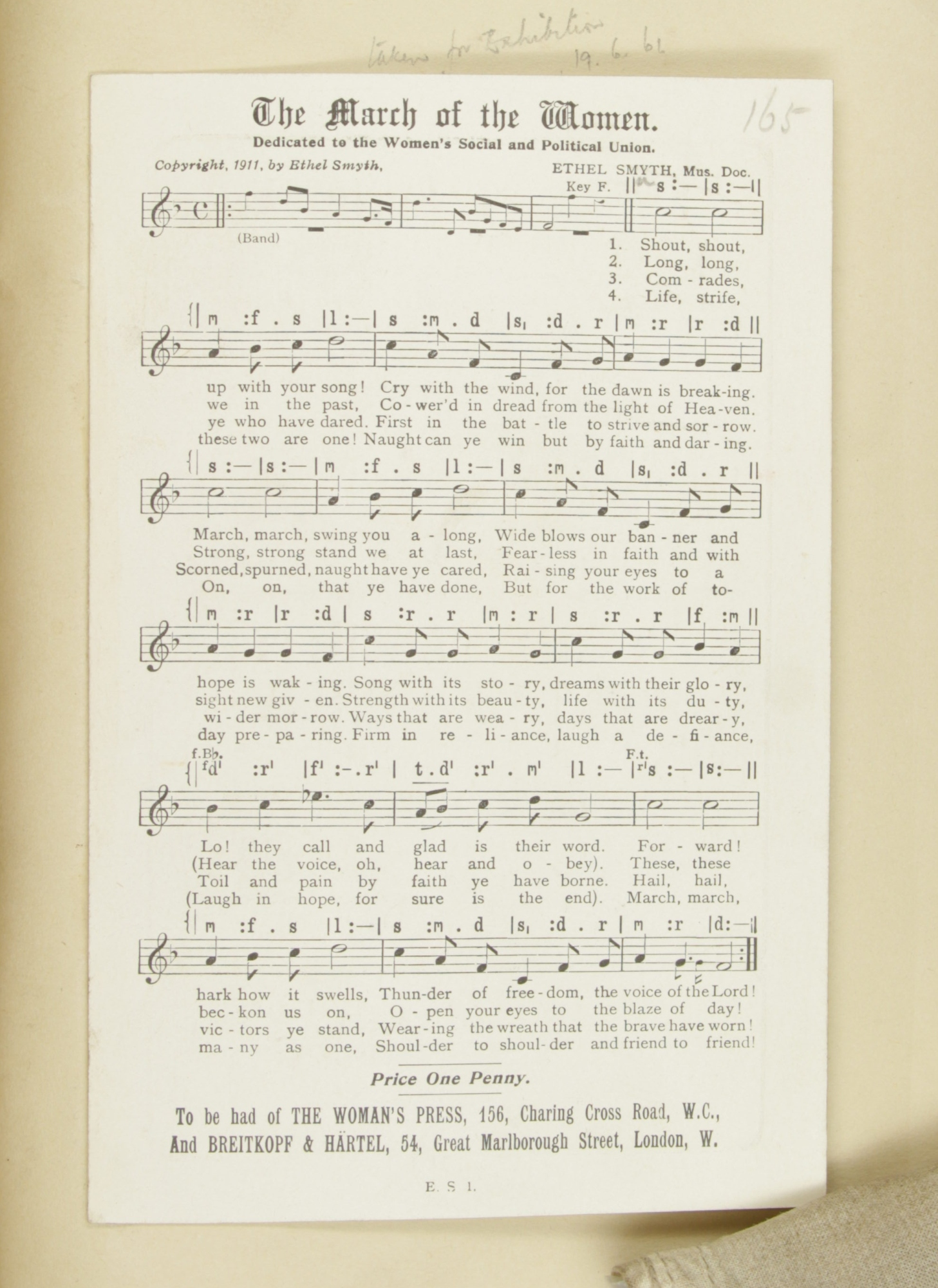
Ethel Smyth March of the Women

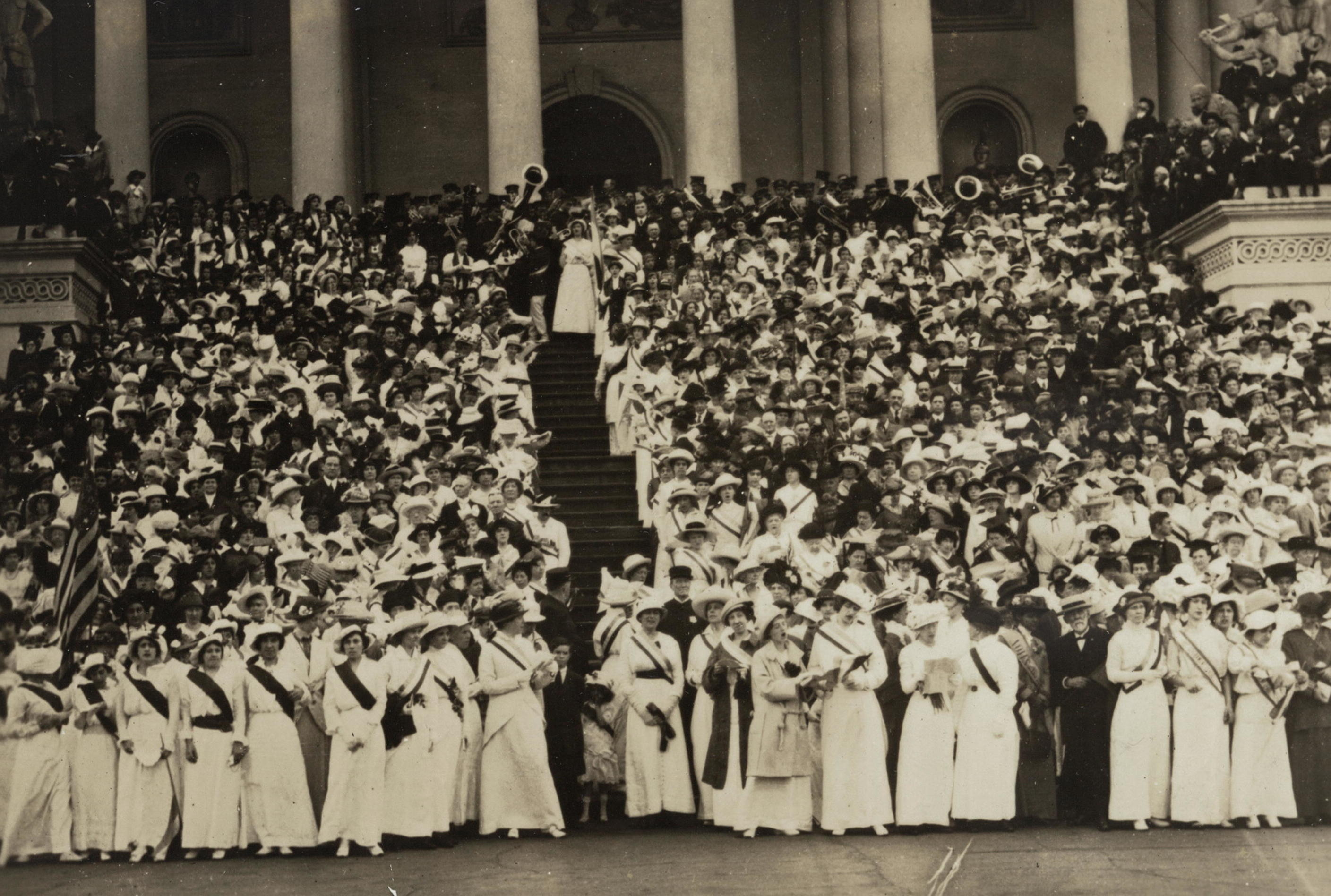
Congressional Union for Woman Suffrage petitioners on the steps of the United States Capitol, 9 May 1914. Those in the front line are singing "The March of the Women".

"The March of the Women" is a song composed by Ethel Smyth in 1910, to words by Cicely Hamilton. It became the official anthem of the Women's Social and Political Union (WSPU) and more widely the anthem of the women's suffrage movement throughout the United Kingdom and elsewhere. Activists sang it not only at rallies but also in prison while they were on hunger strike. Smyth produced a number of different arrangements of the work.

== Composition ==
Ethel Smyth composed the song in 1910, as a unison song with optional piano accompaniment, with words by Cicely Hamilton. Smyth based the melody on a traditional tune she had heard in Abruzzo, Italy. She dedicated the song to the WSPU. In January 1911, the WSPU's newspaper, Votes for Women, described the song as "at once a hymn and a call to battle".

== Performances ==
"The March of the Women" was first performed on 21 January 1911, by the Suffrage Choir, at a ceremony held on Pall Mall, London, to celebrate a release of activists from prison. Emmeline Pankhurst introduced the song as the WSPU's official anthem, replacing "The Women's Marseillaise". The latter song was a setting of words by WSPU activist Florence Macaulay to the tune of La Marseillaise.

On 23 March 1911 the song was performed at a rally in the Royal Albert Hall. Smyth was ceremonially presented with a baton by Emmeline Pankhurst, and proceeded to conduct the whole gathering in singing it. Smyth was active in promoting the performance of the song throughout the WSPU's membership. It became the anthem of the women's suffrage movement throughout the United Kingdom.

A famous rendering of it took place in 1912, at Holloway Prison, after many women activists were imprisoned as a result of a window-smashing campaign. Smyth's part in this had been to break the window of Lewis Harcourt, the Secretary of State for the Colonies. The conductor Thomas Beecham visited Smyth in prison and reported that he found the activists in the courtyard "...marching round it and singing lustily their war-chant while the composer, beaming approbation from an overlooking upper window, beat time in almost Bacchic frenzy with a toothbrush."

While imprisoned in April 1913, Emmeline Pankhurst undertook a hunger strike which she did not expect to survive. She told Smyth that at night she would feebly sing "The March of the Women" and another of Smyth's compositions, "Laggard Dawn".

The march was also used during a large demonstration of American suffragists rallying in Washington, D.C., on May 9, 1914. The Congressional Union for Woman Suffrage sent delegates to march up the Capitol building stairs and present a petition to the U.S. Congress and accompanied by a 1,000 singer chorus.

== Arrangements ==
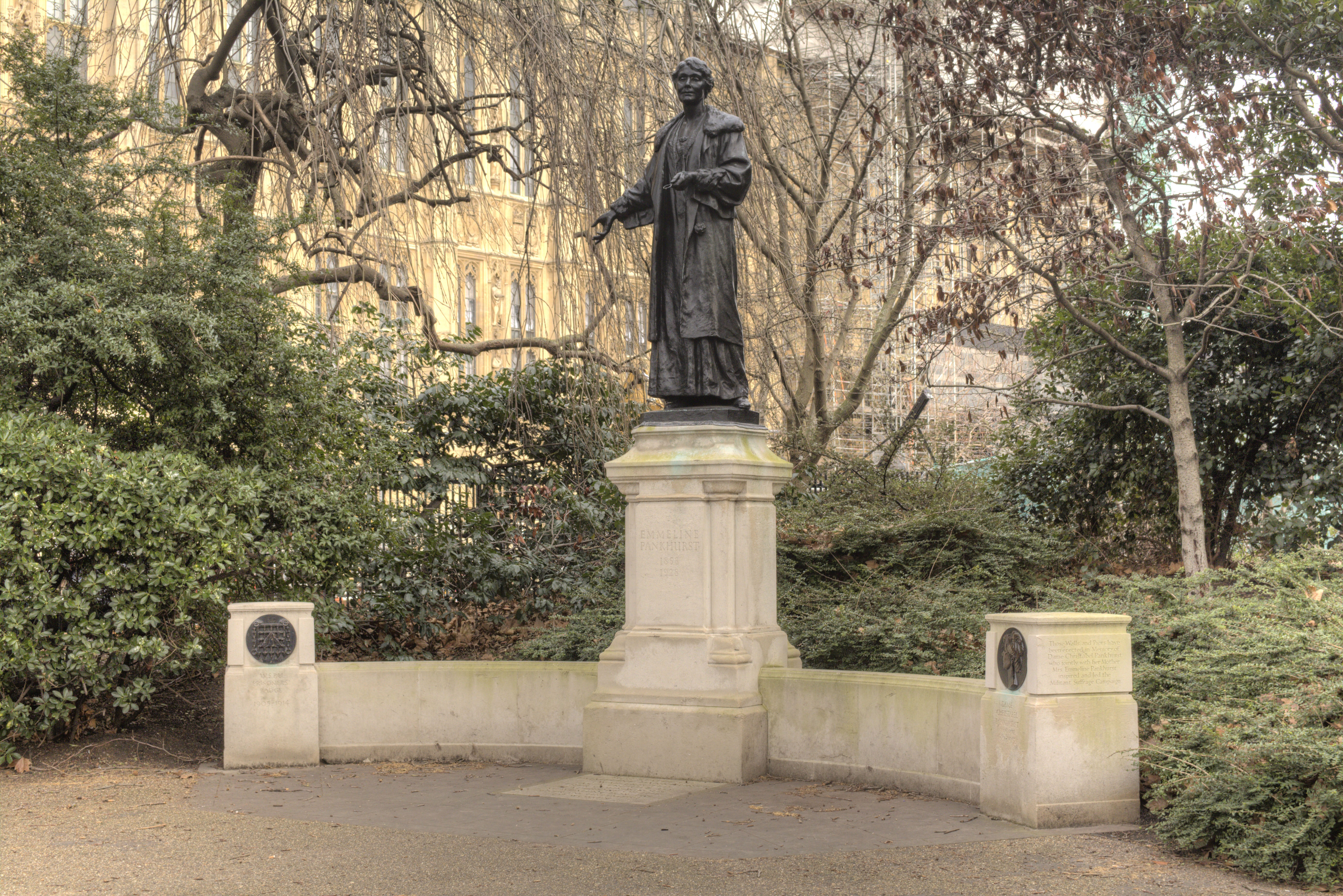
Emmeline Pankhurst's statue, now the Pankhurst Memorial, unveiled in 1930 as Smyth conducted "The March of the Women"

Smyth arranged the work several times. A version for choir and optional orchestra was included in Songs of Sunrise, a collection of three songs premiered on 1 April 1911 at the Queen's Hall, London. The other two songs in the collection were "Laggard Dawn" and "1910". An arrangement of "The March of the Women" for solo piano appeared in 1914 in King Albert's Book, a fund-raising publication for Belgian relief. On 6 March 1930, Smyth conducted a version of the march for military band, on the occasion of the unveiling of a statue to memorialize Emmeline Pankhurst in Victoria Tower Gardens. The ceremony was presided over by Stanley Baldwin, and the performance was by the band of the Metropolitan Police.

The tune of "The March of the Women" also appears in the overture of Smyth's opera The Boatswain's Mate.

== Cover art ==
The cover art for The March of the Women was designed by artist and dancer Margaret Morris.

== See also ==
- List of compositions by Ethel Smyth
- Music and women's suffrage in the United States
- Art in the women's suffrage movement in the United States

== Sources ==
- Bennett, Jory (1987). Crichton, Ronald (ed.). The Memoirs of Ethel Smyth: Abridged and Introduced by Ronald Crichton, with a list of works by Jory Bennett. Harmondsworth: Viking. ISBN 0-670-80655-2.
- Collis, Louise (1984). Impetuous Heart: the Story of Ethel Smyth. London: W. Kimber. ISBN 978-0-7183-0543-7.
- Crawford, Elizabeth (2001). The Women's Suffrage Movement: a Reference Guide, 1866–1928. London: Routledge. ISBN 0-415-23926-5.
- Florey, Kenneth (2013). Women's Suffrage Memorabilia: An Illustrated History. McFarland & Company, Inc. ISBN 9780786472932.
- Fuller, Sophie (1994). Pandora Guide to Women Composers. London: Pandora. ISBN 0-04-440897-8.
- Norris, Geoffrey (31 July 2008). "Ethel Smyth from prison to the Proms". The Daily Telegraph.
- Purvis, June (2002). Emmeline Pankhurst: a Biography. London: Routledge. ISBN 0-415-23978-8.
- St John, Christopher (1959). Ethel Smyth: a Biography. London: Longmans.
