= Fête Galante (Smyth) =

- Opera by Ethel Smyth
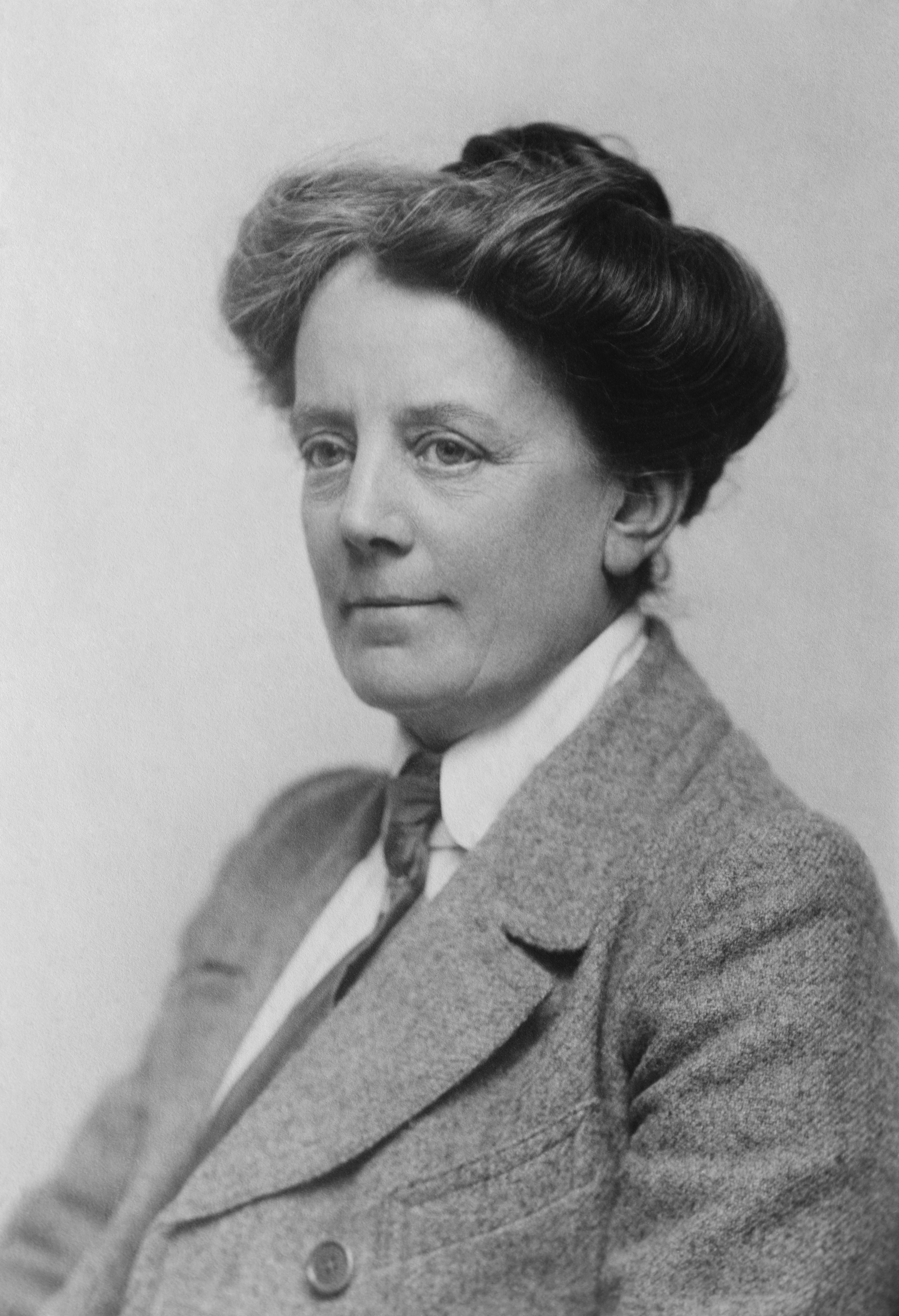
- Ethel Smyth in 1922
- Librettist: Ethel Smyth; Edward Shanks
- Language: English
- Based on: "Fête Galante", short story by Maurice Baring
- Premiere: 4 June 1923; Birmingham Repertory Theatre

Fête Galante is an opera in one act composed by Ethel Smyth to an English-language libretto by Smyth and Edward Shanks based on Maurice Baring's 1909 short story of the same name. It is a tale of late night fête galante involving aristocrats and a commedia dell'arte troupe where jealousy, desire, and multiple masquerades end in the death of one of the characters. Described by the composer as a "Dance-dream", the opera premiered on 4 June 1923 at the Birmingham Repertory Theatre.

== Background ==
Fête Galante was the fifth of Smyth's six operas and marked a return to the genre after a seven-year gap. World War I had forced the cancellation of several performances of her works in Europe, and especially Germany where three of her earlier operas were first performed. After The Boatswain's Mate premiered in 1916, she concentrated her efforts on the women's suffrage movement and on her writing, producing two books of memoirs. During that time, she was suffering from depression, the onset of deafness, and a loss of confidence in her abilities as a composer.

After finishing her first volume of memoirs, Impressions That Remained, in 1919 she approached her friend Maurice Baring for permission to set his short story "Fête Galante" as an opera, hoping that it would tempt her back into composing. He initially refused, but three months later gave his approval. By that time, her enthusiasm for composition had waned and she began work on her second volume of memoirs, Streaks of life. However, she returned to the project in 1921 when she received a commission from the British National Opera Company. It was her first (and only) commissioned opera.

The libretto was written by Smyth and the war poet Edward Shanks and closely follows Baring's story of a late night fête galante in which the Pierrot is hanged by a jealous king. Like Fantasio, Smyth's earlier comic opera, Fête Galante involves mistaken identity and disguise, but is a much darker tale. Its title and themes of aristocratic open-air festivity, masquerade and commedia dell'arte harked back to the operas of Rameau and Lully but were also echoed in the neoclassical works of Smyth's contemporaries Debussy, Busoni, and Stravinsky. Smyth composed Fête Galante in a neoclassical style, incorporating baroque dances and a madrigal set to a poem by John Donne. It was to be her only foray into that idiom.

== Roles ==
Role	Voice
The King	Baritone
The Queen	Mezzo-soprano
The Lover	Tenor
Columbine	Light Soprano
Pierrot	Light Baritone
Pantaloon	silent
Harlequin	Light tenor
4 Puppet Voices	SATB
Courtiers, Guests, Satyrs, Bacchantes, Etc.

== Recordings ==
A complete recording of Fête Galante by Retrospect Opera was released in November 2019. It is conducted by the renowned Smyth interpreter and champion, Odaline de la Martinez.
