= Odaline de la Martinez =

Cuban and American musician (born 1949)

Odaline de la Martinez (born 31 October 1949) is a Cuban and American composer and conductor, currently residing in the UK. She is the artistic director of Lontano, a London-based contemporary music ensemble which she co-founded in 1976 with New Zealander flautist Ingrid Culliford, and was the first woman to conduct at the BBC Promenade Concerts (the Proms) in 1984. As well as frequent appearances as a guest conductor with leading orchestras throughout Great Britain, including all the BBC orchestras, she has conducted several leading ensembles around the world, including the Ensemble 2e2m in Paris; the New Zealand Symphony Orchestra; the Australian Youth Orchestra; the OFUNAM and the Camerata of the Americas in Mexico; and the Vancouver Chamber Orchestra. She is also known as a broadcaster for BBC Radio and Television and has recorded extensively for several labels.

== Biography ==
Odaline de la Martinez was born in 1949 in Matanzas and grew up in Jovellanos, a cane-sugar manufacturing town in the same province. After the Bay of Pigs Invasion in 1961 her parents decided to send her and her sister to live with their aunt and uncle in the United States. She enrolled at Tulane University, New Orleans, where she studied both music and mathematics, graduating summa cum laude in 1972 and receiving several awards upon graduation - a Marshall Scholarship from the British government, and a Danforth and Watson Fellowships - which allowed her to continue her studies at the Royal Academy of Music, where she studied composition with Paul Patterson and piano with Else Cross and where she founded Lontano Ensemble in 1976 with Ingrid Culliford. With Lontano she conducted the premiere of Judith Weir's The Consolations of Scholarship at the University of Durham in 1985 (subsequently recording it with Linda Hirst in 1989).

Martinez received her MMus in composition from the University of Surrey in 1977, where she studied with Reginald Smith Brindle. This was followed by composer awards from the American National Endowment for the Arts (1979) and a Guggenheim Fellowship (1980), supporting the composition of her first opera Sister Aimee: An American Legend (1984), with a libretto by John Whiting. Sister Aimme was premiered at Tulane University in 1984, followed by two other productions at the Royal College of Music (1987) and in Marin County College, California, in 1995.

In the 1980s, Odaline de la Martinez had a weeknight show on BBC Radio Three. The show was engaging, an education in new music.

In 1984 Martinez became the first woman to conduct at a BBC Promenade Concert at the Royal Albert Hall. In 1987 she was awarded the Villa Lobos medal from the Brazilian government for her championing of the music of Heitor Villa Lobos and other Brazilian composers. Her continuing commitment to showcase the music of Latin America for UK and European audiences led her in 1989 to co-direct with Eduardo Mata VIVA! - a festival of Latin-American music - at London's South Bank Centre. In 1990 she was made a fellow of the Royal Academy of Music and in 1992 she founded LORELT (Lontano Records Limited) with the intent of promoting the work of living composers and women and Latin American composers from all periods. The label has since released over 30 CDs to critical acclaim.

In the summer of 1994 Martinez conducted the BBC Proms premiere of Ethel Smyth's The Wreckers, later released on CD by Conifer Records. A CD recording of Smyth's orchestral music for Chandos Records followed, and in 2016 the first complete recording of The Boatswain's Mate. A project for a complete recording of Smyth's Fête Galante, by Retrospect Opera, was announced in August 2016.

After a gap of almost 10 years, Martinez began composing again. First, music to a radio play commissioned by BBC Radio 4 (1998), followed by the Hansen Variations for Piano (1999) - commissioned by the Music Department of Tulane University. In 2008 she completed her second opera, Imoinda, with a libretto by Joan Anim-Addo about slavery and the beginning of the Afro-Caribbean culture.

In the autumn of 2006 together with Lontano Ensemble she founded the London Festival of American Music aiming to introduce UK audiences to a broader spectrum of works from contemporary American and US-based composers, and it has continued to be celebrated biennially since then. Several major works have received their UK premieres there, including works by John Harbison, Marjorie Merryman, Daniel Asia, Peter Child and Roberto Sierra.

== List of compositions ==
=== Operas ===
==== Sister Aimee: An American Legend (1978–1983) [90'] ====
Mezzo Soprano, Tenor, Baritone, SATB Chorus, Strings, Brass Quintet

Premiered at Tulane University in April 1984 to celebrate the university's 150th anniversary. The UK premiere was held at the Royal College of Music in London in June 1987, and the work was also performed at Marin County College, California in 1995.

==== Imoinda: A Story of Love and Slavery (2006–2018) [1h 45'] ====
Complete trilogy premiered in February–March 2019 at The Warehouse, London, as part of the 7th London Festival of American Music. The operas can be performed individually or as one.

===== Part I: Imoinda (2006) [45'] =====
Soprano, Mezzo-Soprano, 2 Tenors, Baritone, Mixed Voice ensemble SATB, Strings, 4 Percussionists

A video of selected scenes from Imoinda was filmed in 2015 with an Opera America Grant for Female Composers.

===== Part II: The Crossing (2013) [28'] =====
Soprano, Tenor, SATB Chorus, Strings, 3 Percussionists

Commissioned and premiered by Tulane University in 2014 with the Xavier University Choir and soloists of the Louisiana Philharmonic. The UK premiere was held in November 2014 at the 6th London Festival of American Music, performed by Eclectic Voices and Lontano Ensemble.

===== Part III: Plantation (2018) [37'] =====
Soprano, Mezzo-Soprano, Tenor, SATB Ensemble, Strings, 4 Percussionists

Premiered at the 7th London Festival of American Music in 2019 by the Lontano Ensemble, soloists and Festival vocal ensemble.

=== Chamber music ===
==== Litanies (1981) ====
Harp, Flute, String Trio

Premiered by Lontano at the Wigmore Hall in London, 1981, and broadcast by the BBC. Premiered in the US by the Pittsburgh New Music Ensemble. Also performed as part of the Irish Lontano tour in 1987.

==== Suite for Cello and Cor Anglais (1982) ====
Cello, Cor Anglais

Commissioned and premiered by the McGrath duo at St George's Hanover Square in London in June 1982.

==== Canciones (1983) ====
Voice, Percussion, Piano

Commissioned and premiered by Janis Kelly and Simon Limbrick with Timothy Barrett at the Wigmore Hall in May 1983. Toured with Lontano for Eastern Arts (UK), in Canada, and broadcast by the CBC.

==== String Quartet (1984) ====
String Quartet

Commissioned by the Roth Quartet with funds from The Arts Council of Great Britain and premiered by them at the Purcell Room in January 1985.

==== Cantos de amor (1985) ====
Soprano, Violin, Viola, Cello, Piano

Commissioned by Chester Festival and premiered by Domus in July 1985. Subsequently, performed by Lontano at the Akademie der Bildenden Kunste Berlin and at St John's Smith Square in London. US premiere held at Merkin Hall in New York City in 1990.

=== Choral works (a capella) ===
==== Misa breve afrocubana (1975) ====
Soprano, Alto, Tenor, Bass

Revised version of an earlier work. Originally premiered by the Choir of Palo Verde High School in Tucson, Arizona in 1966. The revised version was performed by the Choir of the Royal Academy of Music, London, conducted by Michael Procter in 1975.

==== A las cinco de la tarde (1972/2018) ====
3 Sopranos, 2 Altos, 2 Tenors, 3 Basses

Based on a poem of the same title by Federico García Lorca. Performed by the Choir of the Royal Academy of Music, London, 1972, conducted by Michael Procter, and revised in 2018.

==== O Absalom (1977) ====
Countertenor, 2 Tenors, Baritone, Bass

Premiered by the Michael Procter Consort at the Seven Oaks Festival in May 1977.

==== Two American Madrigals (1978) ====
Choir

On two poems by Emily Dickinson. Commissioned for the Cork International Choral and Folk Dance Festival in 1978 by the Ruth Drady Memorial Trust, and premiered by the Oxford Schola Cantorum. Recorded by the BBC Singers for BBC Radio 3.

=== Choral works (with ensemble) ===
==== Psalmos (1977) ====
Soprano, Alto, Tenor, Bass, Brass Quintet, Timpani, Electric Organ

Premiered at Western Washington University in November 1977. UK premiere held at St John's Smith Square in London by the choir of the University of Surrey.

=== Choral works (with string orchestra) ===
==== The Crossing (2013) [28'] ====
Soprano, Tenor, SATB Chorus, Strings, 3 Percussionists

From the opera, Imoinda. Commissioned and premiered by Tulane University in 2014, with Xavier University Choir and soloists of the Louisiana Philharmonic. UK premiere held in November 2014 at the 6th London Festival of American Music, performed by Eclectic Voices and Lontano.

=== String orchestra ===
==== Five Russian Songs (1987) ====
Soprano, String Orchestra

Commissioned by the Covent Garden Festival with funds from London Arts and premiered by the London Chamber Symphony in September 1987.

=== Orchestra ===
==== Suite from 'Imoinda' (2018) ====
2 fls, 2 obs, 2cls, 2 bsn, 2 hns, 4 percs, strings

Funded with a grant from the Cintas Foundation.

=== Solos and duos ===
==== Little Piece (1975) [3'] ====
Solo flute

Premiered by Judith Pearce at Dartington Summer School in 1976. Performed in Israel and broadcast in New Zealand by Ingrid Culliford.

==== EOS for Solo Organ (1976) ====
Organ, Assistant

Premiered by Susan Heath at St Bride's Church, London and performed at Coventry Cathedral.

==== After Sylvia (1976) ====
Soprano, Piano

On poems by Sylvia Plath. Premiered at the ISME Festival in Montreaux, Switzerland. Broadcast by the BBC. Performed and broadcast in Romania and Belgrade, Yugoslavia. US Premiere held in 2018 at the University of Illinois, Urbana-Champaign. Also performed in 2019 at Florida International University, Miami, and by North/South Consonance at Christ & St Stephen's Church in New York City.

==== A Moment’s Madness (1977) ====
Flute, (Inside the) Piano

Premiered at Carnegie Recital Hall, New York, by Lyn McLarin and Jonathan Rutherford in November 1977. UK Premiere at the Purcell Room by Ingrid Culliford. Broadcast by Radio Beograd.

==== Improvisations (1977) ====
Solo Violin

Premiered in October 1978 at the Istanbul Arts Festival. UK premiere at a SPNM concert in 1980 by Irvine Arditi.

==== Color Studies (1978) ====
Solo Piano

Commissioned by Eleanor Alberga with funds from the Arts Council of England and premiered by her at Southbank Centre's Purcell Room, London.

==== Asonancias (1982) ====
Solo Violin

Commissioned by Sophie Langdon and premiered by her at the Purcell Room in London. Broadcast by the BBC World Service and BBC Radio 3.

==== Hansen Variations (1999) ====
Solo Piano

Commissioned by the Music Department of Tulane University and premiered there by Daniel Weilbaecher Jr. that year.

=== Electronic works ===
==== Hallucination (1975) ====
Electronic Tape

Premiered at the Salzburg Seminar for Contemporary American Music in April 1976.

==== Visions and Dreams (1977-78) ====
Electronic Tape

Premiered at the University of Hawaii and performed at the 1978 International Computer Music Conference of Chicago, and at various American universities.

==== Lamento (1979) ====
Soprano, Mezzo-Soprano, Tenor, Bass (all amplified), Tape

Premiered by Electric Phoenix at St John's Smith Square in London in 1979, and performed in Holland and at the University of York.

==== Three Pieces for Percussion and Electronics (1980) ====
Percussion, Tape Delay

Commissioned and premiered by James Wood, with funds provided by the Eastern Arts Association, at the Wells-on-Sea Arts Centre, and performed again at the Purcell Room, London.

=== Early works ===
==== Five Imagist Songs (1974) ====
Soprano, Clarinet, Piano

Premiered at the Kelso Festival in Scotland by soprano, Sarah Mosely, and clarinetist, Rory Allam, with the composer at the piano.

==== Phasing (1975) ====
Chamber Orchestra, Flute, Oboe, Clarinet, Bassoon, Divided Strings

Premiered by the Manson Ensemble at the RAM. Also performed at the Zagreb Music Biennale and at the University of Surrey.
