= The Cecilia Chorus of New York =

The Cecilia Chorus of New York, formerly known as the St. Cecilia Chorus, is an avocational chorus and nonprofit organization based in New York City.

With a membership of approximately 180 singers, the chorus performs twice annually at Carnegie Hall with a professional orchestra and soloists, as well as at other New York–area venues.

== History ==
=== Early years ===
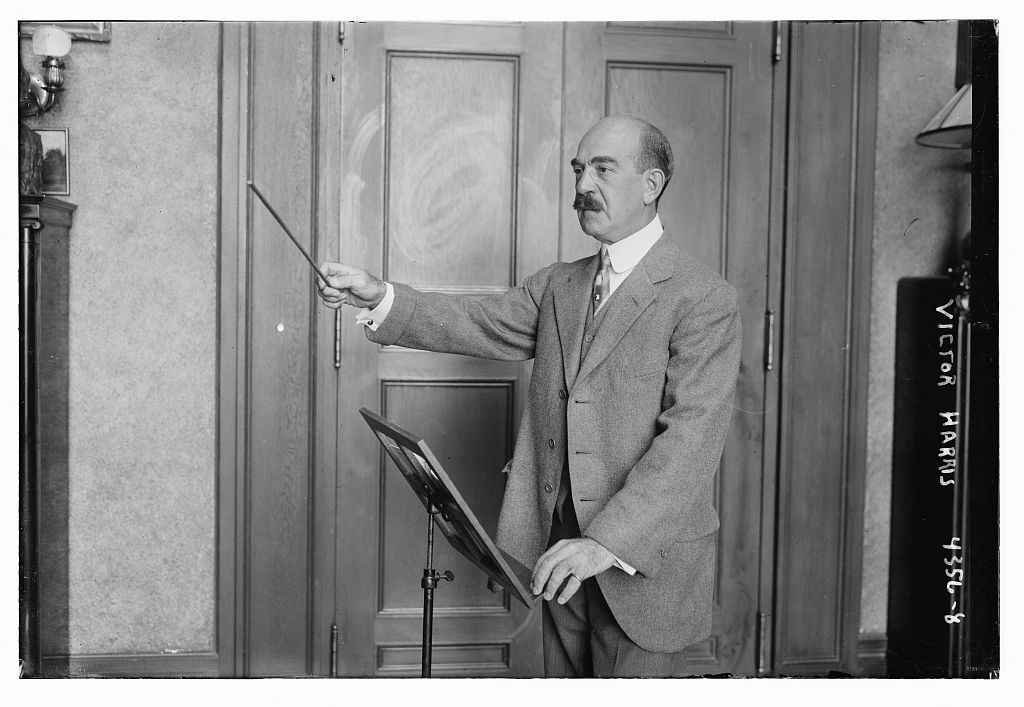
Victor Harris

A secular, unaffiliated organization, the Chorus was founded in 1906 as a women's chorus. Its nucleus formed in 1900 when a small group of women began meeting to sing together at each other's Manhattan homes on Tuesday mornings. The principal organizers were Susan Warren and Mrs. Henry Burden; the pianist and leader was Elliot Schenck. Warren, Burden and their colleagues established an all-women's chorus which they named the Tuesday Morning Singing Club. Membership was by invitation only, and rehearsals were held at the Waldorf Astoria Hotel. In 1906, the Tuesday Morning Singing Club invited Metropolitan Opera coach Victor Harris to be their conductor. Harris accepted on the conditions that rehearsals be held at his studio and that the musical work be in earnest. Thus was the "Saint Cecilia Club" founded in 1906. Under Harris's leadership the Saint Cecilia Club grew rapidly to become a prominent choral organization in New York City.

In 1922, while still a women's group (as it remained until 1965), the Chorus won significant attention when it appeared with The Philharmonic Society of New York under Willem Mengelberg in the first New York performance of Mahler's Symphony No. 3. During this period, the Chorus gave several dozen world and U.S. premieres, by composers including Amy Beach, Deems Taylor, and Virgil Thomson.

Harris continued as the Chorus's Music Director until 1936; he was succeeded by Léon Barzin (1936–37), Willard Sektberg (1937–42), Hugh Ross (1942–195?), David Buttolph (195?–1965), David Randolph (1965–2010) and Mark Shapiro (since 2011).

=== David Randolph ===
In 1965, when David Buttolph resigned, Chorus members recalled that they had enjoyed working with David Randolph when he substituted at a rehearsal in October 1959. The Chorus tapped Randolph to become their sixth music director; he continued in this role until his death in 2010. Under Randolph's direction, the Chorus grew in size and ability, and in 1969 performed its first concert in Carnegie Hall. In addition to its twice-yearly Carnegie Hall concerts, some of which were broadcast live on WNYC Radio, Randolph led the Chorus in other major venues, including Lincoln Center's Avery Fisher Hall (now David Geffen Hall).

In April 1981, prompted by the popularity of the Broadway play Amadeus, the Chorus performed a program in Carnegie Hall featuring the U.S. premiere of Antonio Salieri's Mass No. 1 juxtaposed with Mozart's Great Mass in C minor. The program was broadcast on WNYC. Amadeus author Peter Shaffer attended and spoke from the stage.

In December 1986, also in Carnegie Hall, the Chorus gave the North American premiere of Oratorium nach Bildern der Bibel by Fanny Mendelssohn, sister of Felix Mendelssohn.

During his 37 years with The Masterwork Chorus, Randolph specialized in conducting Handel's Messiah. These performances became a seasonal tradition in New York City. In 1995, Randolph directed the St. Cecilia Chorus in its first performances of Messiah. The two performances at Carnegie Hall were notably successful. By popular demand the work was brought back for two performances on December 20, 1997, and for performances led by Randolph in 2005 and 2008, and by his successor Mark Shapiro in 2011, 2013, 2015 and subsequently.

In 1993, members of the Chorus made a recording with Liza Minnelli for the benefit of AIDS research. In 1996, a small group of Chorus members appeared as Christmas carolers in The Preacher's Wife, a major motion picture starring Whitney Houston and Denzel Washington.

During Randoph's tenure, the Chorus also performed under other conductors including Lukas Foss, John Alldis, John Nelson, Romano Gandolfi [it] (La Scala), Peter Tiboris, and Eve Queler (Opera Orchestra of New York).[3]

=== Mark Shapiro ===
In July 2011, after a national search, Mark Shapiro was appointed the seventh music director of the Chorus. In 2012, to more clearly represent its secular, unaffiliated mission, the Chorus changed its name to The Cecilia Chorus of New York.

Under Shapiro, the Chorus, while maintaining its engagement with standard repertoire, embarked on a new path of commissioning and premiering works at Carnegie Hall as well as other venues. Concurrently, the Chorus revitalized its commitment to showcasing neglected masterpieces from the past. Commissioned composers have included The Brothers Balliett, Jonathan Breit, Tom Cipullo, Raphael Fusco and Zaid Jabri. The Chorus's performance of Tom Cipullo's Credo for a Secular City (2014) was honored in 2015 with the Chorus America/ASCAP Alice Parker Award.

Other notable accomplishments include the long-delayed New York premieres, both in Carnegie Hall, of two major works by Dame Ethel Smyth: the Mass in D (1891), which the Chorus performed in 2013, and The Prison (1930), which the Chorus performed in 2018. In 2012 the Chorus presented a rare revival of The Christmas Story (1949) by neglected American composer Peter Mennin, a former president of The Juilliard School, and a Marian Trilogy by early Baroque composer Isabella Leonarda. In 2018, the Chorus gave the North American premiere of the Messe Romane by Thierry Escaich. The Chorus's 2019 performance of a program in tribute to Walt Whitman, including a premiere by Jorge Martín and music by the neglected nineteenth century American composer John Knowles Paine, was broadcast on the public radio series "Pipe Dreams."

In March 2020, on the eve of the COVID-19 pandemic that ravaged New York City as well as many other localities, the Chorus performed The Belshazzar Project, a curated evening in five languages of settings of the Belshazzar story from The Book of Daniel ("You are weighed in the balance, and found wanting."). Composers included Alexandre Guilmant, G. F. Handel, Arseny Koreshchenko, Gioacchino Rossini and Robert Schumann, as well as Johnny Cash, Penny Prince and Harold Rome. The program additionally featured spoken texts by Byron, Dickinson and others, which were read by actor Kathleen Chalfant.

== Repertoire ==
Below is a list of performances since 1966.

Performances from 2011 and later conducted by Mark Shapiro, unless otherwise indicated.

Performances from 1966 through 2010 conducted by David Randolph, unless otherwise indicated.

Composer	Work	Performance date	Venue
Ames, David	"Ode for St. Cecilia's Day" (world premiere)	March 4, 2001	Church of the Heavenly Rest
Bach, CPE	Magnificat	December 6, 2006	Carnegie Hall
Bach, JCF	Wachet auf, ruft uns die Stimme	December 10, 2016	Carnegie Hall
Bach, JE	Meine Seele erhebet den Herren	December 10, 2016	Carnegie Hall
Bach, JS	Cantata No. 4, "Christ lag in Todesbanden"	April 16, 1977	Carnegie Hall
	Cantata No. 8, "Liebster Gott"	Mar 5, 1995	Church of the Heavenly Rest
	Cantata No. 21, "Ich hatte viel Bekümmernis"	February 25, 2007	Church of the Heavenly Rest
	Cantata No. 50, "Nun ist das Heil"	March 13, 1967	The Town Hall
	Cantata No. 104, "Du Hirte Israel, höre"	February 28, 1966	Hunter College
	Cantata No. 106, "Gottes Zeit"	January 17, 1971	Riverside Church
		March 27, 1971	Carnegie Hall
	Cantata No. 140, "Wachet auf"	March 18, 1968	The Town Hall
	Cantata No. 147, "Herz und Mund"	April 19, 1975	Carnegie Hall
	Christmas Oratorio	December 16, 1973	Carnegie Hall
		December 17, 1977	Carnegie Hall
		December 20, 1980	Carnegie Hall
		December 21, 1985	Carnegie Hall
		December 16, 1988	Carnegie Hall
		December 22, 1990	Carnegie Hall
		December 9, 1993	Carnegie Hall
		December 20, 1996	Carnegie Hall
		December 23, 2001	Carnegie Hall
		December 10, 2004	Carnegie Hall
		December 7, 2007	Carnegie Hall
		December 23, 2010	Carnegie Hall
			Patrick Gardner, conductor
		December 9, 2017	Carnegie Hall
	Magnificat, BWV 243	March 2, 1970	Carnegie Hall
		December 17, 1982	Carnegie Hall
		December 7, 2002	Carnegie Hall
		December 10, 2016	Carnegie Hall
	Mass in B minor	April 7, 1979	Carnegie Hall
		April 6, 1984	Carnegie Hall
		April 20, 1990	Carnegie Hall
		May 12, 2000	Carnegie Hall
		May 8, 2010	Carnegie Hall
			Patrick Gardner, conductor
	Passion According to St. John	March 25, 1972	Carnegie Hall
		April 10, 1992	Carnegie Hall
	Passion According to St. Matthew	April 4, 1987	Carnegie Hall
		May 14, 2004	Carnegie Hall
Balliett, Brad & Doug	Oedipus the King (world premiere)	March 12, 2017	Church of the Holy Trinity
Beach, Amy	The Chambered Nautilus	January 21, 1908	The Waldorf Astoria (Premiere)
			Victor Harris, conductor
		1931	
Beethoven	Choral Fantasy	April 25, 1976	Avery Fisher Hall, Lincoln Center
		May 2, 2015	Carnegie Hall
	Elegischer Gesang	April 8, 1978	Carnegie Hall
	Fidelio (Finale)	May 2, 2015	Carnegie Hall
	Mass in C Major	March 2, 1970	Carnegie Hall
		December 16, 1983	Carnegie Hall
		March 5, 2000	Church of the Heavenly Rest
		February 22, 2009	Church of the Heavenly Rest
			Patrick Gardner, conductor
		May 2, 2015	Carnegie Hall
	Missa solemnis	May 7, 1988	Carnegie Hall
		May 22, 1988	Carnegie Hall
			Lukas Foss, conductor
		April 25, 1998	Carnegie Hall
		May 6, 2016	Carnegie Hall
	Opferlied	April 8, 1978	Carnegie Hall
	Symphony No. 9 ("Choral")	March 12, 1989	Carnegie Hall
			Lukas Foss, conductor
		May 12, 2001	Carnegie Hall
		April 28, 2006	Carnegie Hall
Berlioz	Messe Solennelle	March 2, 2003	Church of the Heavenly Rest
	Requiem	May 10, 1991	Carnegie Hall
		April 20, 1996	Carnegie Hall
	Te Deum	March 2, 1986	St. George's Church
		March 30, 1986	Carnegie Hall
			John Nelson, conductor
Bernstein	Chichester Psalms	January 17, 1971	Riverside Church
		February 10, 1989	Stephen Wise Synagogue
		February 26, 1989	St. Bartholomew's Church
		March 12, 1989	Carnegie Hall
			Lukas Foss, conductor
		February 24, 2008	Church of the Heavenly Rest
Billings	David's Lamentation	March 18, 1968	The Town Hall
Brahms	Gesang der Parzen	May 7, 2005	Carnegie Hall
	Nänie	January 16, 1972	Riverside Church
		April 30, 1999	Carnegie Hall
		May 7, 2005	Carnegie Hall
		April 25, 2014	Carnegie Hall
	Requiem	April 25, 1976	Avery Fisher Hall, Lincoln Center
		May 2, 1976	St. George's Church
		April 29, 1989	Carnegie Hall
		April 30, 1999	Carnegie Hall
		May 7, 2005	Carnegie Hall
		May 6, 2017	Carnegie Hall
	Schicksalslied	April 11, 1980	Carnegie Hall
		April 30, 1999	Carnegie Hall
		April 18, 2009	Carnegie Hall
Breit, Jonathan	Der Zippelfagottist	December 10, 2016	Carnegie Hall
Bruckner	Christus Factus Est	January 17, 1971	Riverside Church
	Mass in E minor	May 14, 1983	Carnegie Hall
	Missa solemnis	March 6, 1994	Church of the Heavenly Rest
	Te Deum	April 25, 2014	Carnegie Hall
Byrd, William	Sing Joyfully	March 1, 2015	Church of the Holy Trinity
Cipullo, Tom	Credo for a Secular City	April 25, 2014	Carnegie Hall
Charpentier	"Midnight Mass" for Christmas Eve	December 15, 1979	Carnegie Hall
Cherubini	Requiem in C minor	March 3, 1985	St. George's Church
		February 11, 1996	Church of the Heavenly Rest
Corigliano	Fern Hill	March 13, 1967	The Town Hall
Duruflé	Requiem	May 17, 1981	Church of the Holy Trinity
		February 25, 1990	St. Bartholomew's Church
		February 24, 2008	Church of the Heavenly Rest
Dvorák	Requiem	March 1, 1987	St. George's Church
		June 12, 1990	Carnegie Hall
			Will Kessling, conductor
		May 12, 1995	Carnegie Hall
	Te Deum	March 7, 1993	Church of the Heavenly Rest
Elgar	The Music Makers	May 12, 2001	Carnegie Hall
Escaich, Thierry	Messe Romane	March 3, 2018	Church of the Holy Trinity
Fauré	Cantique de Jean Racine	March 2, 1970	Carnegie Hall
		April 27, 1974	Carnegie Hall
		May 20, 1984	St. George's Church
		March 9, 1997	Church of the Heavenly Rest
		May 22, 2011	Church of the Heavenly Rest
			Gerald Greland, conductor
		March 3, 2018	Church of the Holy Trinity
	Madrigal	March 9, 1997	Church of the Heavenly Rest
	Pavane	March 9, 1997	Church of the Heavenly Rest
		May 22, 2011	Church of the Heavenly Rest
			Gerald Greland, conductor
	Requiem	January 28, 1973	Riverside Church
		May 20, 1984	St. George's Church
		June 21, 1988	Avery Fisher Hall
			Peter Tiboris, conductor
		March 9, 1997	Church of the Heavenly Rest
		March 13, 2005	Church of the Heavenly Rest
		May 22, 2011	Church of the Heavenly Rest
			Gerald Greland, conductor
Finzi, Gerald	For St. Cecilia	December 8, 2000	Carnegie Hall
	In Terra Pax: A Christmas Scene	December 8, 2000	Carnegie Hall
Fusco, Raphael	Divis Cetera: an Ode from Mount Soracte	December 22, 2012	Carnegie Hall
Gabrieli	Jubilate Deo	December 15, 1979	Carnegie Hall
Gibbons, Orlando	Hosanna to the Son of David	March 1, 2015	Church of the Holy Trinity
	O Clap Your Hands Together	March 1, 2015	Church of the Holy Trinity
Gounod	Messe Solennelle	May 17, 1992	St. Bartholomew's Church
		March 7, 1999	Church of the Heavenly Rest
		February 26, 2006	Church of the Heavenly Rest
	Requiem	March 3, 2018	Church of the Holy Trinity
Handel	Acis and Galatea	February 28, 1966	Hunter College
	Coronation Anthems	December 13, 1975	Carnegie Hall
	Dettingen Te Deum	Dec 15, 1989	Carnegie Hall
	Dixit Dominus	December 15, 1979	Carnegie Hall
		December 20, 1991	Carnegie Hall
	Israel in Egypt	April 7, 1973	Carnegie Hall
		April 4, 1982	Ft. Hamilton, Brooklyn
		April 17, 1982	Carnegie Hall
		December 7, 1999	Carnegie Hall
	Judas Maccabaeus	December 15, 1974	Carnegie Hall
		December 16, 1984	Stephen Wise Synagogue
		December 19, 1984	Carnegie Hall
	Messiah	Dec 23, 1995, 2:30	Carnegie Hall
		Dec 23, 1995, 8:00	Carnegie Hall
		Dec 20, 1997, 2:30	Carnegie Hall
		Dec 20, 1997, 8:00	Carnegie Hall
		December 10, 2005	Carnegie Hall
		December 13, 2008	Carnegie Hall
		December 9, 2011	Carnegie Hall
		December 13, 2013	Carnegie Hall
		December 15, 2013	Tilles Center
		December 12, 2015	Carnegie Hall
		December 13, 2015	Tilles Center
	Solomon	December 19, 1976	Carnegie Hall
Haydn, Joseph	Die Beredsamkeit	September 22, 1994	Weill Recital Hall, Carnegie Hall
	Mass No. 5 in C, "Cäcilianmesse"	April 19, 1975	Carnegie Hall
		January 22, 1982	Carnegie Hall
		December 20, 1991	Carnegie Hall
	Mass No. 9 in B Flat "Paukenmesse"	March 31, 1969	Carnegie Hall
	Mass No. 10 in B Flat "Heiligmesse"	April 8, 1978	Carnegie Hall
	Mass No. 11 in D minor, "Nelsonmesse"	February 28, 1966	Hunter College
		March 6, 1988	St. George's Church
	Mass No. 12 in B Flat, "Theresienmesse"	December 6, 2003	Carnegie Hall
	Mass No. 13 in B Flat, "Schöpfungsmesse"	March 3, 2002	Church of the Heavenly Rest
	Te Deum	December 16, 1983	Carnegie Hall
		March 3, 1985	St. George's Church
Haydn, Michael	Requiem	March 3, 2002	Church of the Heavenly Rest
Honegger	King David	December 11, 1987	Carnegie Hall
			Martin Bookspan, narrator
		January 29, 1988	Stephen Wise Synagogue
Hummel	Mass in B flat	December 10, 2009	Carnegie Hall
Isenberg, Rex	Messiahs False and True	March 6, 2016	Church of the Holy Trinity
Jabri, Zaid	A Garden Among the Flames (world premiere)	May 6, 2017	Carnegie Hall
Kay	"Allelulia, Give Ear" (from Choral Triptych)	March 2, 1970	Carnegie Hall
Kodály	Missa Brevis	March 10, 1991	St. Bartholomew's Church
	Te Deum	January 16, 1972	Riverside Church
		April 29, 1989	Carnegie Hall
Lassus	Echo Song	Sep 22,1994	Weill Recital Hall, Carnegie Hall
	Mon Coeur	March 18, 1968	the Town Hall
		Sep 22,1994	Weill Recital Hall, Carnegie Hall
Lauridsen, Morten	Lux Aeterna	April 9, 2011	Carnegie Hall
Leonarda, Isabella	Two Motets	December 22, 2012	Carnegie Hall
Mendelssohn, Fanny	Oratorium Nach Bildern der Bibel	December 20, 1986	Carnegie Hall
Mendelssohn, Felix	Die erste Walpurgisnacht	April 11, 1980	Carnegie Hall
		April 29, 1994	Carnegie Hall
		May 4, 2007	Carnegie Hall
	Elijah	March 23, 1986	Stephen Wise Synagogue
		April 5, 1986	Carnegie Hall
		December 19, 1992	Carnegie Hall
		January 22, 1993	Stephen Wise Synagogue
	Kyrie	November 4, 1978	Carnegie Hall
		January 21, 1979	St. George's Church
	Lauda Sion	March 5, 2000	Church of the Heavenly Rest
	Symphony No. 2, "Lobgesang"	December 17, 1982	Carnegie Hall
		December 8, 2000	Carnegie Hall
Mennin, Peter	The Christmas Story	December 22, 2012	Carnegie Hall
Monteverdi	Lasciatemi morire	March 18, 1968	The Town Hall
Mozart	Ave Verum Corpus	December 13, 1975	Carnegie Hall
	"Coronation" Mass, K. 317	December 13, 1975	Carnegie Hall
		December 16, 1983	Carnegie Hall
		February 22, 2009	Church of the Heavenly Rest
			Patrick Gardner, conductor
	"Great" Mass in C minor, K. 427	March 27, 1971	Carnegie Hall
		April 10, 1981	Carnegie Hall
		December 15, 1989	Carnegie Hall
		December 11, 1998	Carnegie Hall
		December 6, 2003	Carnegie Hall
		December 10, 2009	Carnegie Hall
	Misericordias Domini, K. 222	April 8, 1978	Carnegie Hall
	Regina Coeli	April 10, 1981	Carnegie Hall
	Requiem	March 13, 1967	The Town Hall
		May 14, 1983	Carnegie Hall
		December 11, 1998	Carnegie Hall
		December 7, 2002	Carnegie Hall
		December 6, 2006	Carnegie Hall
		April 9, 2011	Carnegie Hall
		May 11, 2018	Carnegie Hall
	Te Deum	January 28, 1973	Riverside Church
	Vesperae solemnes de confessore, K. 339	March 31, 1969	Carnegie Hall
		April 8, 1978	Carnegie Hall
		March 6, 1994	Church of the Heavenly Rest
		February 26, 2006	Church of the Heavenly Rest
		February 26, 2012	Church of the Heavenly Rest
Orff	Carmina Burana	April 29, 1994	Carnegie Hall
		April 27, 2002	Carnegie Hall
		May 4, 2007	Carnegie Hall
Pergolesi	Magnificat	April 16, 1977	Carnegie Hall
Pinkham, Daniel	Christmas Cantata	December 15, 1979	Carnegie Hall
Poulenc	Gloria	December 15, 1994	Carnegie Hall
		March 13, 2005	Church of the Heavenly Rest
		December 13, 2014	Carnegie Hall
Puccini	Edgar	October 8, 1977	Brooklyn College
			Eve Queler, conductor
	Messa di Gloria	March 22, 1980	Bridgeport, CT
			Harrison Valente, conductor
		April 11, 1980	Carnegie Hall
		May 17, 1992	St. Bartholomew's Church
		February 29, 2004	Church of the Heavenly Rest
Purcell	Praise the Lord, O Jerusalem	March 31, 1969	Carnegie Hall
Rachmaninoff	The Bells	April 27, 2002	Carnegie Hall
Randolph, David	Andante for Strings	December 8, 2000	Carnegie Hall
		April 9, 2011	Carnegie Hall
Rutter	Gloria	May 2, 1997	Carnegie Hall
Saint-Saëns	Requiem	March 7, 1999	Church of the Heavenly Rest
Salieri	Grand Mass No. 1 in D	April 10, 1981	Carnegie Hall
		May 17, 1981	Church of the Holy Trinity
Schubert	Mass No. 5 in A flat	December 20, 1986	Carnegie Hall
		March 4, 2001	Church of the Heavenly Rest
	Mass No. 6 in E flat	March 18, 1968	The Town Hall
		April 16, 1977	Carnegie Hall
		March 8, 1998	Church of the Heavenly Rest
		February 21, 2010	Church of the Heavenly Rest
	Stabat Mater	March 5, 1995	Church of the Heavenly Rest
		February 25, 2007	Church of the Heavenly Rest
		February 26, 2012	Church of the Heavenly Rest
Smyth, Dame Ethel	Mass in D (New York premiere)	April 14, 2013	Carnegie Hall
	The Prison	May 11, 2018	Carnegie Hall
Tallis	Spem in Alium	November 4, 1978	Carnegie Hall
			John Alldis, conductor
Taylor, Deems	Highwayman	1931	
Tchaikovsky	scenes from The Maid of Orleans	April 14, 2013	Carnegie Hall
Tomkins, Thomas	When David Heard	March 1, 2015	Church of the Holy Trinity
Telemann	Wie ist dein Name so gross	March 27, 1971	Carnegie Hall
Tye, Christopher	Give Almes of Thy Goods	March 1, 2015	Church of the Holy Trinity
Vaughan Williams	Dona Nobis Pacem	February 26, 1989	St. Bartholomew's Church
		April 28, 2006	Carnegie Hall
	Hodie	December 15, 1994	Carnegie Hall
		December 13, 2014	Carnegie Hall
	Hodie (two movements)	March 1, 2015	Church of the Holy Trinity
	Mass in G minor	April 27, 1974	Carnegie Hall
		March 10, 1991	St. Bartholomew's Church
	Serenade to Music	November 4, 1978	Carnegie Hall
			John Alldis, conductor
		January 21, 1979	St. George's Church
	Symphony No. 1, A Sea Symphony	May 16, 1985	Carnegie Hall
		May 2, 1997	Carnegie Hall
		April 18, 2009	Carnegie Hall
	Toward the Unknown Region	April 25, 2014	Carnegie Hall
Verdi	Requiem	March 20, 1983	Park Ave. Christian Church
		April 9, 1983	Bridgeport, CT
			Romano Gandolfi, conductor
		April 17, 1993	Carnegie Hall
		May 2, 2003	Carnegie Hall
		May 2, 2008	Carnegie Hall
		April 21, 2012	Carnegie Hall
	Stabat Mater	May 16, 1985	Carnegie Hall
	Te Deum	May 16, 1985	Carnegie Hall
Vivaldi	Dixit Dominus	January 22, 1982	Carnegie Hall
		February 25, 1990	St. Bartholomew's Church
	Gloria	April 27, 1974	Carnegie Hall
		February 29, 2004	Church of the Heavenly Rest
		December 22, 2012	Carnegie Hall
	Magnificat	December 13, 1975	Carnegie Hall
		March 6, 1988	St. George's Church
Walton	Coronation Te Deum	November 4, 1978	Carnegie Hall
Weelkes, Thomas	Gloria in Excelsis Deo	March 1, 2015	Church of the Holy Trinity
Zelenka	Missa Dei Patris	March 7, 1993	Church of the Heavenly Rest
Zimmermann, H. W.	Psalmkonzert	March 31, 1969	Carnegie Hall
		April 27, 1974	Carnegie Hall
