= Edward Shanks =

English writer and poet (1892–1953)

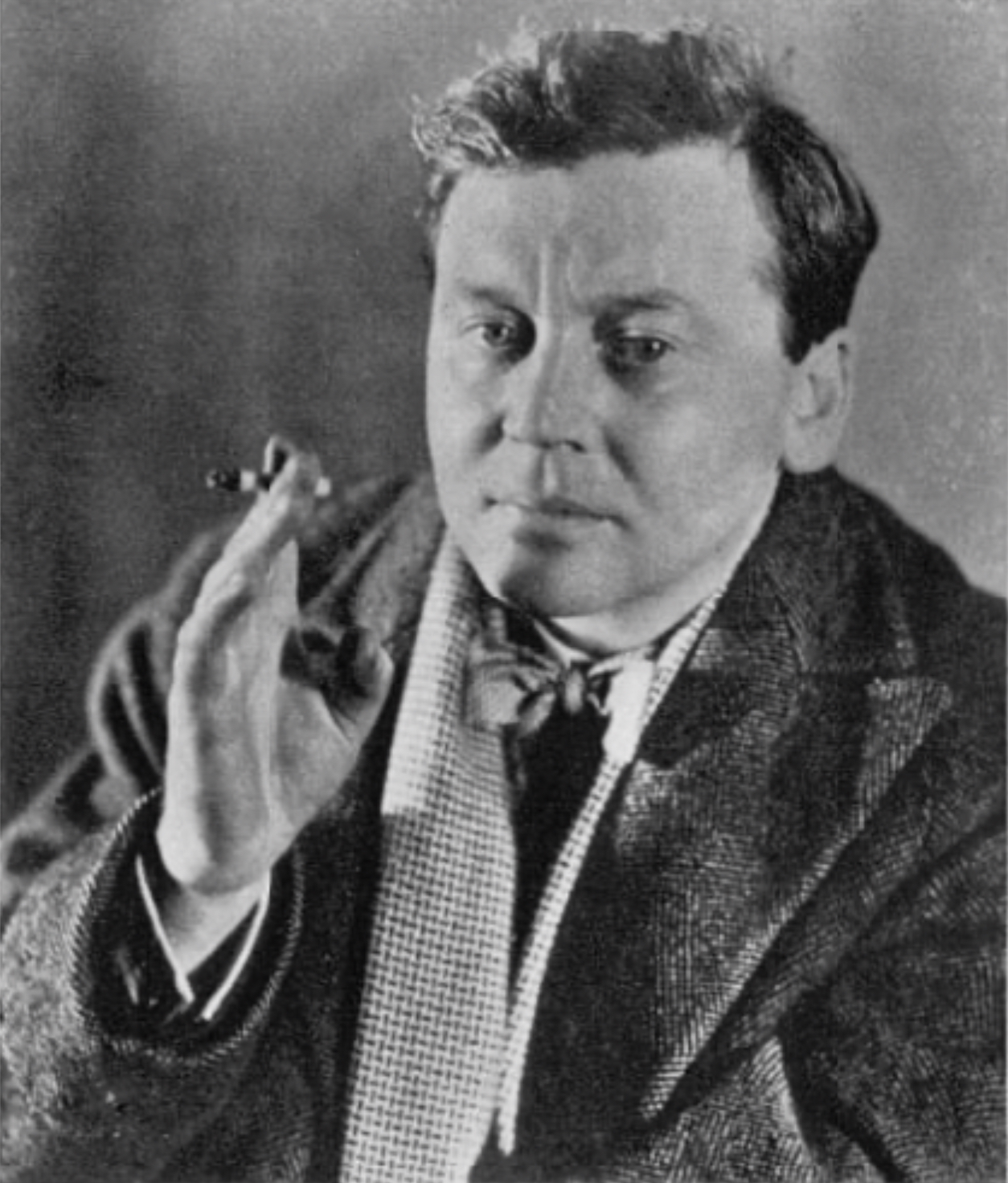
The Bystander, 1934

Edward Richard Buxton Shanks (11 June 1892 – 4 May 1953) was an English writer, known as a war poet of World War I, then as an academic and journalist, and literary critic and biographer. He also wrote some science fiction.

He was born in London, and educated at Merchant Taylors' School and Trinity College, Cambridge. He passed his B.A. in history in 1913. He was editor of Granta from 1912 to 1913. At Cambridge, Shanks befriend the poet Rupert Brooke. He served in World War I with the British Army in France, but was invalided out in 1915, and did administrative work until war's end. During this time, Shanks came into contact with Edward Marsh, who promoted Shanks' poetry in his Georgian Poetry anthologies.

He was later a literary reviewer, working for the London Mercury (1919–22) and for a short while a lecturer at the University of Liverpool (1926). He was the chief leader-writer for the Evening Standard from 1928 to 1935.

The People of the Ruins (1920) was a science-fiction novel by Shanks, in which a man wakes after being put into suspended animation in 1924, to discover a devastated Britain 150 years in the future. The People of the Ruins has an anti-communist subtext (the future 2074 is devastated by Marxist revolutionaries).

== Awards and honors ==
He was the first recipient of the Hawthornden Prize in 1919, for his collection The Queen of China and Other Poems.

== Works ==
- Songs (1915) poems
- Hilaire Belloc, the man and his work (1916) with C. Creighton Mandell
- Poems (1916)
- The Queen of China and Other Poems (1919) poems
- The Old Indispensables (1919) novel
- The People of the Ruins (1920) novel Text at Project Gutenberg Australia
- The Island of Youth and Other Poems (1921) poems
- The Richest Man (1923) novel
- First Essays on Literature (1923) criticism
- Fête Galante (1923) opera libretto
- Bernard Shaw (1924) criticism
- The Shadowgraph and Other Poems (1925)
- Collected Poems (1900–1925) (1926)
- The Beggar's Ride (1926) drama
- Second Essays on Literature (1927) criticism (W. Collins Sons & Co. Ltd., London)
- Queer Street (1933)
- The Enchanted Village (1933) (A sequel "Queer Street", however, this one more uncommon)
- Poems 1912–1932 (1933)
- Tom Tiddler's Ground (1934)
- Old King Cole (1936) novel
- Edgar Allan Poe (1937)
- My England (1939)
- Rudyard Kipling – A Study in Literature and Political Ideas (1940)
- Poems 1939–1952 (1953)
