= Entente Cordiale (opera) =

- Comic opera by Ethel Smyth
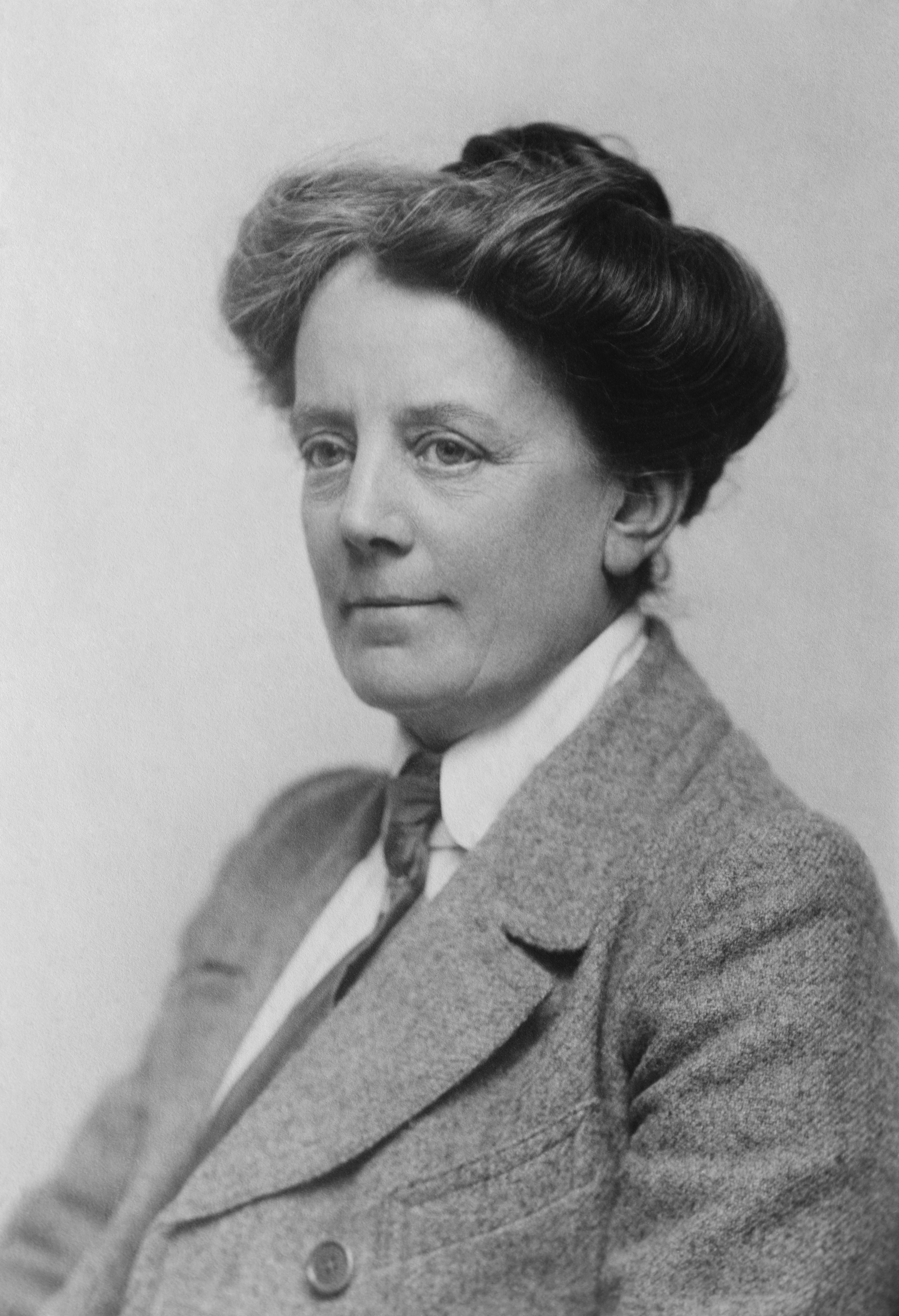
- Ethel Smyth in 1922
- Librettist: Ethel Smyth
- Language: English
- Premiere: 22 July 1925; Royal College of Music, London

Entente Cordiale is a comic opera in one act by Ethel Smyth with an English-language libretto by Smyth, who describes the work as "a post-war comedy in one act (founded on fact)". It was first performed by students at the Royal College of Music in London on 22 July 1925.

== Background and performance history ==
Entente Cordiale was Smyth's sixth and last opera. The title is a reference to the Entente Cordiale, a series of 1904 cooperation agreements between Britain and France, although the opera itself is set at the end of World War I. The plot revolves around the farcical consequences of a British soldier's imperfect understanding of French. The idea came from a story recounted to her over dinner by Oscar Wilde's friend and mentor Robert Ross.

The opera was composed between 1923 and 1924 and was first performed by students at the Royal College of Music on 22 July 1925. The performance, conducted by the composer, was also broadcast on BBC Radio. Smyth's earlier opera Fête Galante was also performed.

Its first fully staged public performance was at the Theatre Royal, Bristol on 20 October 1926, with the City of Birmingham Orchestra conducted by Smyth. This took place during a one-off festival of opera at the Theatre Royal, organised by Philip Napier Miles. For the Bristol run, Smyth made some minor cuts to the opera. The audience gave it a warm reception.

The work is laced with First World War military slang and numerous bugle calls. Reviews in The Times criticised much in the opera for being reminiscent of a military concert party. However, they praised the instrumental music, especially the intermezzo, and also the choruses at the wives' arrival and at the final dramatic climax.

The intermezzo and overture from the opera were given their first concert performances on 3 October 1925 in the Proms at the Queen's Hall, London, and the intermezzo was performed again in the 1926 Proms. An orchestral suite adapted by Smyth from the opera was premiered in early 1935, during the 1934 Proms winter season. Smyth also made several arrangements of the intermezzo, for various instrumental combinations, as Two Interlinked French Folk Melodies. Under this title, it featured in the 1958 Last Night of the Proms. Writing in 1959, Kathleen Dale described it as a very popular concert piece. It was also recorded in 2003 by the City of Prague Philharmonic Orchestra for the album Entente Cordiale: Light Classics (White Line #2147).

== Roles and premiere cast ==
- Jeanne Arcot – Gwyneth Edwards
- Emma Iggins – Winifred Burton
- Erb Iggins – Robert Gwynne
- Bill Baylis – Dunstan Hart
- Charles Arcot – Charles Draper

== Synopsis ==
Place: A small town in northern France
Time: 1919

The Adjutant sends Erb Iggins to the market to buy provisions for the battalion, ordering him to get signed receipts. Erb, who speaks terrible French, tries to buy a chicken from Jeanne Arcot, but she refuses to sign the receipt as her husband Charles has warned her never to sign anything. Hoping that a written explanation in French will persuade her, Erb goes with Bill Baylis to ask the town's notary public to provide one.

A group of soldiers' wives, including Emma Iggins, arrives unexpectedly from England. Emma finds Erb with Bill as they emerge from the notary's house with a French document. Erb gives it to Jeanne, who reveals he has just signed a marriage contract. Jeanne exults, Erb is terrified, and Emma and Charles are infuriated. The Adjutant restores order. Marital harmony is re-established after Jeanne explains her apparent delight was only a joke, and Bill realises that Erb confused the notary by insistently mispronouncing poulet ("chicken") as "pool", which sounded like a term of endearment (poule).
