= Fantasio (Smyth) =

Opera by Ethel Smyth

- Opera by Ethel Smyth
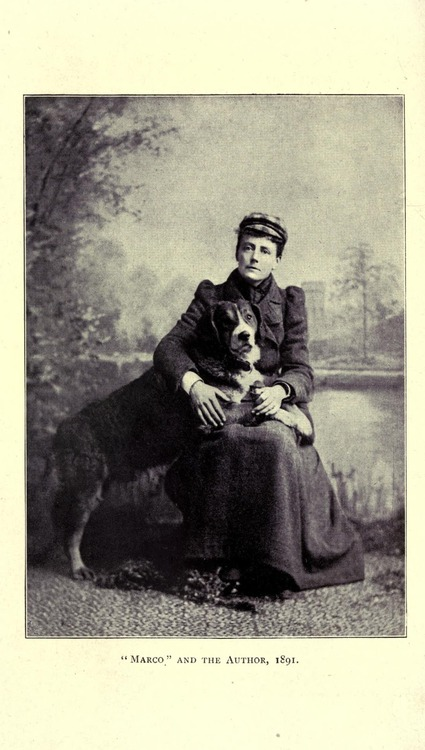
- Ethel Smyth in 1891
- Librettist: Ethel Smyth; Henry Bennet Brewster
- Language: German
- Based on: Fantasio, play by Alfred de Musset
- Premiere: 24 May 1898; Deutsches Nationaltheater, Weimar

Fantasio is an opera in two acts composed by Ethel Smyth. The German-language libretto was written by Smyth and Henry Bennet Brewster. Described in the libretto as a phantastische Comödie (fantastic comedy), it was based on Alfred de Musset's 1834 play of the same name. The opera premiered at the Deutsches Nationaltheater in Weimar on 24 May 1898.

== Performance history ==
Smyth turned to composing opera on the advice of conductor Hermann Levi, who praised her aptitude for dramatic composition when she showed him her Mass in D in Munich. The idea of adapting a play by Alfred de Musset came from her friend Empress Eugénie.

From 1894, Smyth made frequent trips around Europe trying to arrange a premiere for Fantasio. She received a string of rejections, but conductor Felix Mottl at Karlsruhe became interested. It was eventually staged at Weimar thanks to support from Mottl, who wrote to the Weimar conductor Bernhard Stavenhagen, and from Charles Alexander, Grand Duke of Saxe-Weimar-Eisenach and Baroness Olga Meyendorff. However, the reviews were poor. The correspondent for the Musikalisches Wochenblatt described it as a mediocre production with the exception of the leading roles. Although many noted the difficulty of her score and some felt she had tried to be too clever, using heavy and complicated techniques where lightness and simplicity would have been more appropriate, Smyth's claims of praise for her orchestration are corroborated by the reviews. In 1901 Mottl conducted it at Karlsruhe, but it was not revived again. Smyth later acknowledged that the libretto was weak and out of kilter with the tempestuous music, but thought that the experience had been valuable for her subsequent operatic career.
