= Gymnastics at the 2015 European Games – Women's trampoline =

Women's trampoline at the 2015 European Games
- Venue: National Gymnastics Arena
- Date: 17, 21 June
- Competitors: 23 from 13 nations
- Winning score: 54.335

Medalists
gold medal	Yana Pavlova	Russia
silver medal	Kat Driscoll	Great Britain
bronze medal	Hanna Harchonak	Belarus

The women's trampoline competition at the 2015 European Games was held at the National Gymnastics Arena on 17 and 21 June 2015.

== Qualification ==
The top six gymnasts with one per country advanced to the final.

Rank	Gymnast	Routine 1	Routine 2	Total	Qual.
1	Hanna Harchonak (BLR)	47.795	53.980	101.775	Q
2	Yana Pavlova (RUS)	47.205	54.320	101.525	Q
3	Tatsiana Piatrenia (BLR)	47.235	53.925	101.160	
4	Sviatlana Makshtarova (AZE)	47.515	52.855	100.370	Q
5	Kat Driscoll (GBR)	46.740	52.725	99.465	Q
6	Anna Kornetskaya (RUS)	46.320	52.030	98.350	
7	Nataliia Moskvina (UKR)	45.230	52.965	98.195	Q
8	Marine Jurbert (FRA)	46.335	51.585	97.920	Q
9	Claudia Prat (ESP)	45.895	51.780	97.675	R1
10	Leonie Adam (GER)	45.795	51.675	97.470	R2
11	Ana Rente (POR)	44.760	51.125	95.885	
12	Lila Kasapoglou (GRE)	45.115	50.455	95.570	
13	Fanny Chilo (SUI)	45.790	49.145	94.935	
14	Sabina Zaitseva (AZE)	44.085	49.600	93.685	
15	Beatriz Martins (POR)	44.275	49.300	93.575	
16	Tamari Kakashvili (GEO)	43.405	48.120	91.525	
17	Paraskevi Angelousi (GRE)	42.655	45.210	87.865	
18	Maryna Kyiko (UKR)	47.080	36.350	83.430	
19	Joëlle Vallez (FRA)	44.270	19.425	63.695	
20	Simona Ivanova (BUL)	9.410	48.565	57.975	
21	Valeriya Yordanova (BUL)	43.005	14.860	57.865	
22	Sylvie Wirth (SUI)	41.420	0.000	41.420	
23	Laura Gallagher (GBR)	8.940	11.285	20.225	

== Final ==
Rank	Gymnast	D Score	E Score	ToF Score	Penalty	Total
1st place, gold medalist(s)	Yana Pavlova (RUS)	14.800	23.700	15.835		54.335
2nd place, silver medalist(s)	Kat Driscoll (GBR)	14.400	23.700	15.810		53.910
3rd place, bronze medalist(s)	Hanna Harchonak (BLR)	13.100	24.000	16.465		53.565
4	Nataliia Moskvina (UKR)	14.400	23.400	15.400		53.200
5	Sviatlana Makshtarova (AZE)	13.800	22.800	15.995		52.595
6	Marine Jurbert (FRA)	13.100	22.800	15.385		51.285
