= Gymnastics at the 2015 European Games – Women's synchronized trampoline =

Women's synchronized trampoline at the 2015 European Games
- Venue: National Gymnastics Arena
- Date: 19, 21 June
- Competitors: 20 from 10 nations
- Winning score: 46.400

Medalists
gold medal	Anna Kornetskaya; Yana Pavlova	Russia
silver medal	Marine Jurbert; Joëlle Vallez	France
bronze medal	Beatriz Martins; Ana Rente	Portugal

The women's synchronized trampoline competition at the 2015 European Games was held at the National Gymnastics Arena on 19 and 21 June 2015.

== Qualification ==
Rank	Gymnast	Nation	Routine 1	Routine 2	Total	Qual.
1	Maryna Kyiko; Nataliia Moskvina	Ukraine	39.000	47.700	86.700	Q
2	Marine Jurbert; Joëlle Vallez	France	38.800	45.900	84.700	Q
3	Anna Kornetskaya; Yana Pavlova	Russia	38.500	46.200	84.700	Q
4	Hanna Harchonak; Tatsiana Piatrenia	Belarus	39.100	45.000	84.100	Q
5	Kat Driscoll; Laura Gallagher	Great Britain	40.000	43.800	83.800	Q
6	Beatriz Martins; Ana Rente	Portugal	38.300	44.700	83.000	Q
7	Simona Ivanova; Valeriya Yordanova	Bulgaria	37.300	42.200	79.500	R1
8	Paraskevi Angelousi; Lila Kasapoglou	Greece	35.700	41.300	77.000	R2
9	Sviatlana Makshtarova; Sabina Zaitseva	Azerbaijan	38.900	4.900	43.800	
10	Fanny Chilo; Sylvie Wirth	Switzerland	18.000	9.100	27.100	

== Final ==
Rank	Gymnast	Nation	D Score	E Score	S Score	Pen	Total
1st place, gold medalist(s)	Anna Kornetskaya; Yana Pavlova	Russia	11.400	16.400	18.600		46.400
2nd place, silver medalist(s)	Marine Jurbert; Joëlle Vallez	France	10.300	16.300	18.000		44.600
3rd place, bronze medalist(s)	Beatriz Martins; Ana Rente	Portugal	11.300	15.200	18.000		44.500
4	Hanna Harchonak; Tatsiana Piatrenia	Belarus	13.100	16.400	14.600		44.100
5	Kat Driscoll; Laura Gallagher	Great Britain	9.600	17.400	16.200		43.200
6	Maryna Kyiko; Nataliia Moskvina	Ukraine	4.900	6.200	7.200		18.300
