= Gymnastics at the 2016 Summer Olympics – Women's trampoline =

Women's trampoline at the Games of the XXXI Olympiad
- Venue: Arena Olímpica do Rio
- Date: 12 August 2016
- Competitors: 16 from 13 nations
- Winning score: 56.465

Medalists
1st place, gold medalist(s)		Rosannagh MacLennan	Canada
2nd place, silver medalist(s)		Bryony Page	Great Britain
3rd place, bronze medalist(s)		Li Dan	China

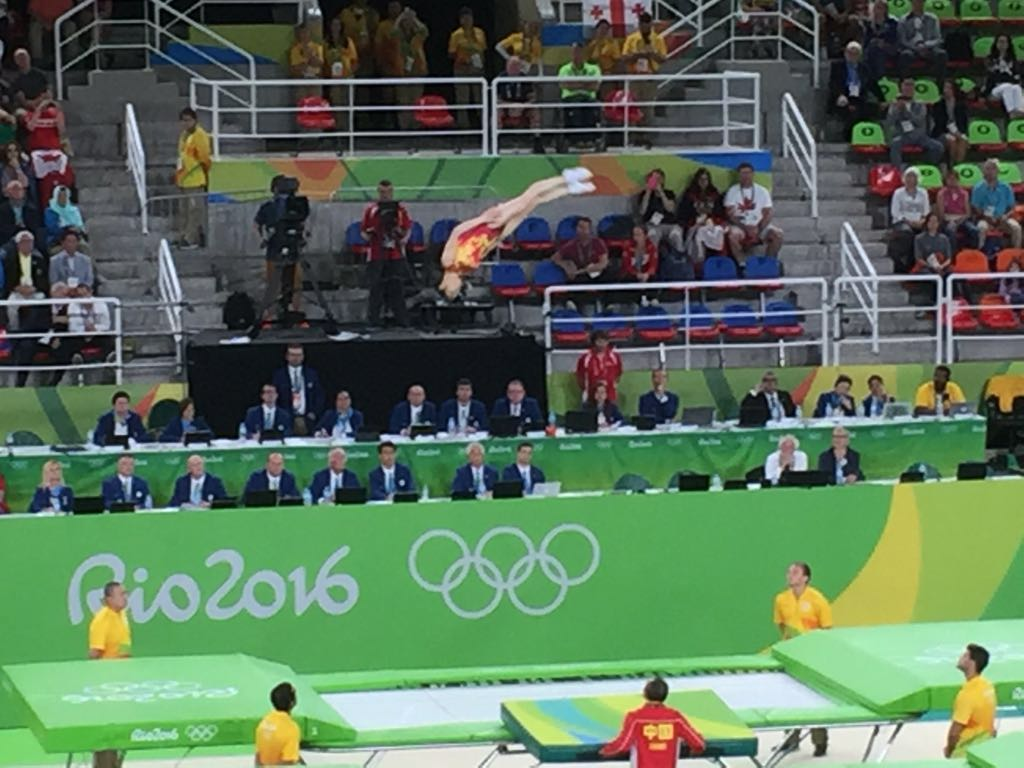
Rio 2016 Summer Olympics

The Women's trampoline competition at the 2016 Summer Olympics was held on 12 August, at the Arena Olímpica do Rio, Rio de Janeiro, Brazil.

== Competition format ==
The competition had rounds: qualification and final. In qualification, the gymnasts performed two routines: compulsory and voluntary. Scores for the two were summed, and the best eight gymnasts moved on to the final. The final consisted of a single routine, with qualification scores not carrying over.

== Schedule ==
All times are local (UTC−3)

Date	Time	Round
Friday, 12 August 2016	14:03	Qualifications
Friday, 12 August 2016	15:42	Finals

== Results ==
=== Qualification ===
Position	Athlete	Compulsory	Voluntary	Total	Notes
1	Tatsiana Piatrenia (BLR)	47.850	56.665	104.515	Q
2	Li Dan (CHN)	48.075	56.000	104.075	Q
3	Rosannagh MacLennan (CAN)	47.490	55.640	103.130	Q
4	He Wenna (CHN)	48.000	55.095	103.095	Q
5	Kat Driscoll (GBR)	46.950	53.345	100.295	Q
6	Hanna Harchonak (BLR)	47.540	52.735	100.275	Q
7	Bryony Page (GBR)	47.550	52.525	100.075	Q
8	Luba Golovina (GEO)	47.080	51.205	98.285	Q
9	Yana Pavlova (RUS)	46.940	51.120	98.060	
10	Leonie Adam (GER)	45.355	52.530	97.885	
11	Ana Rente (POR)	45.220	52.665	97.885	
12	Ekaterina Khilko (UZB)	46.570	50.955	97.525	
13	Rana Nakano (JPN)	44.580	52.195	96.775	
14	Marine Jurbert (FRA)	46.445	50.315	96.760	
15	Nicole Ahsinger (USA)	45.250	50.205	95.455	
16	Nataliia Moskvina (UKR)	46.030	17.300	63.330	

=== Final ===
Position	Athlete	Difficulty	Execution	Flight	Total
1st place, gold medalist(s)	Rosannagh MacLennan (CAN)	15.000	25.200	16.265	56.465
2nd place, silver medalist(s)	Bryony Page (GBR)	14.400	25.500	16.140	56.040
3rd place, bronze medalist(s)	Li Dan (CHN)	15.000	24.900	15.985	55.885
4	He Wenna (CHN)	15.200	24.000	16.370	55.570
5	Tatsiana Piatrenia (BLR)	14.600	24.300	15.750	54.650
6	Kat Driscoll (GBR)	14.400	23.400	15.845	53.645
7	Luba Golovina (GEO)	14.400	21.300	15.310	51.010
8	Hanna Harchonak (BLR)	1.500	2.400	1.800	5.700
