= 2013 Trampoline World Championships =

The 29th Trampoline World Championships was held at the Armeets Arena in Sofia, Bulgaria, from November 7–10, 2013.

== Medal summary ==
=== Medal table ===
| Rank | Nation | Gold | Silver | Bronze | Total |
|---|---|---|---|---|---|
| 1 | China | 4 | 4 | 2 | 10 |
| 2 | Great Britain | 3 | 1 | 4 | 8 |
| 3 | United States | 3 | 1 | 0 | 4 |
| 4 | Russia | 2 | 5 | 3 | 10 |
| 5 | Canada | 1 | 3 | 0 | 4 |
| 6 | Japan | 1 | 0 | 0 | 1 |
| 7 | Australia | 0 | 0 | 1 | 1 |
| 7 | Belarus | 0 | 0 | 1 | 1 |
| 7 | Denmark | 0 | 0 | 1 | 1 |
| 7 | Portugal | 0 | 0 | 1 | 1 |
| 7 | Ukraine | 0 | 0 | 1 | 1 |
| Totals (11 entries) | | 14 | 14 | 14 | 42 |

=== Results ===
| Event | Gold | Silver | Bronze |
|---|---|---|---|
Men
| Individual Trampoline | Dong Dong (CHN) | Tu Xiao (CHN) | Sergei Azarian (RUS) |
| Synchro | Japan (JPN); Manabu Yamaguchi; Yasuhiro Ueyama | Russia (RUS); Mikhail Melnik; Sergei Azarian | Denmark (DEN); Peter Jensen; Christian Andersen |
| Trampoline Team | China (CHN); Tu Xiao; Dong Dong; Gao Lei; He Yuxiang | Russia (RUS); Mikhail Melnik; Sergei Azarian; Dmitry Ushakov; Nikita Fedorenko | Australia (AUS); William Morris; Blake Gaudry; Ty Swadling |
| Double Mini | Mikhail Zalomin (RUS) | Alexander Renkert (USA) | Bruno Nobre (POR) |
| Double Mini Team | United States (USA); Alexander Renkert; Ryan Roberts; Austin White; Austin Nacey | Canada (CAN); Dennis Oppenlander; Denis Vachon; Keegan Soehn; Jonathon Schwaiger | Great Britain (GBR); Peter Cracknell; Matthew Swaffer; Nathaniel Scott; Rhys Gray |
| Tumbling | Kristof Willerton (GBR) | Tagir Murtazaev (RUS) | Grigory Noskov (RUS) |
| Tumbling Team | Russia (RUS); Tagir Murtazaev; Alexander Bezyulev; Grigory Noskov; Alexander Mironov | China (CHN); Liu Longji; Yang Song; Zhang Luo; Lin Qite | Great Britain (GBR); Daniel Lannigan; Greg Townley; Kristof Willerton; Abdullah Izzidien |
Women
| Individual Trampoline | Rosie MacLennan (CAN) | Zhong Xingping (CHN) | Li Dan (CHN) |
| Synchro | Great Britain (GBR); Kat Driscoll; Amanda Parker | China (CHN); Li Dan; Zhong Xingping | Ukraine (UKR); Diana Kliuchnyk; Nataliia Moskvina |
| Trampoline Team | Great Britain (GBR); Emma Smith; Laura Gallagher; Kat Driscoll; Bryony Page | Canada (CAN); Samantha Smith; Samantha Sendel; Rosie MacLennan | Belarus (BLR); Hanna Harchonak; Sviatlana Makshtarova; Tatsiana Piatrenia; Maryia Lon |
| Double Mini | Kristle Lowell (USA) | Svetlana Balandina (RUS) | Jasmin Short (GBR) |
| Double Mini Team | United States (USA); Erin Jauch; Tristan van Natta; Kristle Lowell; Shelby Gill | Canada (CAN); Corissa Boychuk; Tamara O'Brien; Alexandria Giesbrecht; Pamela Kriangkum | Russia (RUS); Anastasiia Ignateva; Polina Troianova; Svetlana Balandina; Daria Romanova |
| Tumbling | Jia Fangfang (CHN) | Lucie Colebeck (GBR) | Chen Lingxi (CHN) |
| Tumbling Team | China (CHN); Jia Fangfang; Chen Lingxi; Cai Qizi; Zhang Yuanyuan | Russia (RUS); Victoria Danilenko; Ekaterina Gaas; Anastasiia Isupova; Anzhelika Soldatkina | Great Britain (GBR); Yasmin Taite; Rachael Letsche; Lucie Colebeck; Jennifer Dawes |

== Men's results ==
=== Individual Trampoline ===
Qualification

| Rank | Gymnast | Note |
|---|---|---|
| 1 | Tu Xiao (CHN) | |
| 2 | Dong Dong (CHN) | |
| 3 | Masaki Ito (JPN) | |
| 4 | Lei Gao (CHN) | |
| 5 | Uladzislau Hancharou (BLR) | |
| 6 | Mikhail Melnik (RUS) | |
| 7 | Sergei Azarian (RUS) | |
| 8 | Diogo Ganchinho (POR) | |
| 9 | Mikalai Kazak (BLR) | |
| 10 | Yasuhiro Ueyama (JPN) | |
| 11 | Peter Jensen (DEN) | |
| 12 | Yuxiang He (CHN) | |
| 13 | Ty Swadling (AUS) | |
| 14 | Luke Strong (GBR) | |
| 15 | Sebastien Martiny (FRA) | |
| 16 | Blake Gaudry (AUS) | |
| 17 | Bartlomiej Hes (POL) | |
| 18 | Logan Dooley (USA) | |
| 19 | Mickael Renault (FRA) | |
| 20 | Dmytro Byedyevkin (UKR) | |
| 21 | Steven Gluckstein (USA) | |
| 22 | Diogo Abreu (POR) | |
| 23 | Mykola Prostorov (UKR) | |
| 24 | Tengizi Koshkadze (GEO) | |
| 25 | Nikita Fedorenko (RUS) | |
| 26 | Tiago Lopes (POR) | |
| 27 | Kyle Soehn (CAN) | |
| 28 | Christopher Schuepferling (GER) | |
| 29 | Nicolas Schori (SUI) | |
| 30 | Sebastien St-Germain (CAN) | |
| 31 | Ricardo Santos (POR) | |
| 32 | Daniel Schmidt (GER) | |
| 33 | Cesar Rafael Prieto Angel (MEX) | |
| 34 | William Morris (AUS) | |
| 35 | Rick Nadler (GER) | |
| 36 | Yasen Ivanov (BUL) | |
| 37 | Bradley Hampson (GBR) | |
| 38 | Rafael Andrade (BRA) | |
| 39 | Lukasz Burdziak (POL) | |
| 40 | Joris Geens (BEL) | |
| 41 | Esaul Ceballos Cervera (MEX) | |
| 42 | Kayvon Arasteh (GBR) | |
| 43 | Simon Debacker (BEL) | |
| 44 | Ruslan Aghamirov (AZE) | |
| 45 | Daniel Alejandro Aguilar Briceno (MEX) | |
| 46 | Ioannis Toptidis (GRE) | |
| 47 | Aliaksei Shostak (USA) | |
| 48 | Jonas Nordfors (SWE) | |
| 49 | Lucas Adorno (ARG) | |
| 50 | Adam Sult (CZE) | |
| 51 | Natanael Camara Rodriguez (PUR) | |
| 52 | Tewfik Chikhi (ALG) | |
| 53 | Gurkan Mutlu (TUR) | |
| 54 | Zander Biewenga (RSA) | |
| 55 | Te Aroha Kierran Tuhi (NZL) | |
| 56 | Santiago Gabriel Marcano (VEN) | |
| 57 | Marc Pinol Berlandino (ESP) | |
| 58 | Zsolt Juhasz (HUN) | |
| 59 | Yoel Enrique Azuaje Garcia (VEN) | |
| 60 | Ahmed Rady Mostafa (EGY) | |
| 61 | Martin Pelc (CZE) | |
| 62 | Tetsuya Sotomura (JPN) | |
| 63 | Romain Legros (FRA) | |
| 64 | Jose Alberto Vargas Garcia (MEX) | |
| 65 | Anton Pryshchepau (BLR) | |
| 66 | Naim Ashhab (CZE) | |
| 67 | Manabu Yamaguchi (JPN) | |
| 68 | Dmitry Ushakov (RUS) | |
| 69 | Oliver Amann (GER) | |
| 70 | Matteo Campus (FRA) | |
| 71 | Keegan Soehn (CAN) | |
| 72 | Lukasz Tomaszewski (POL) | |
| 73 | Lukasz Jaworski (POL) | |
| 74 | Timoteus Karlsson (SWE) | |
| 75 | Christian Andersen (DEN) | |
| 76 | Seif Asser Sherif (EGY) | |
| 77 | Carlos Ramirez Pala (BRA) | |
| 78 | Ali Djaber Brahimi (ALG) | |
| 79 | Dmytro Sobakar (UKR) | |
| 80 | Maxim Van Zeijl (NED) | |
| 81 | Aleh Rabtsau (BLR) | |
| 82 | Martin Spatt (AUT) | |
| 83 | Bernardo Aquino (ARG) | |
| 84 | Maksym Volianskyi (UKR) | |
| 85 | Nikolaos Savvidis (GRE) | |
| 86 | Hassan Mohamed Elkady (EGY) | |
| 87 | Mans Aberg (SWE) | |
| 88 | Jeffrey Gluckstein (USA) | |
| 89 | Husanboy Jonibekov (UZB) | |
| 90 | Sebolai Offering Tlaka (RSA) | |

Final

The men's individual trampoline final was held on November 9.

| Rank | Gymnast | D Score | E Score | T Score | Pen. | Total |
|---|---|---|---|---|---|---|
| 1st place, gold medalist(s) | (China) Dong Dong | 17.100 | 25.200 | 18.495 | 0.000 | 60.795 |
| 2nd place, silver medalist(s) | (China) Tu Xiao | 17.100 | 25.200 | 18.280 | 0.000 | 60.580 |
| 3rd place, bronze medalist(s) | (Russia) Sergei Azarian | 17.300 | 23.700 | 17.900 | 0.000 | 58.900 |
| 4 | (Japan) Yasuhiro Ueyama | 16.600 | 24.300 | 17.545 | 0.000 | 58.745 |
| 5 | (Portugal) Diogo Ganchinho | 17.100 | 24.000 | 17.200 | 0.000 | 58.300 |
| 6 | (Japan) Masaki Ito | 16.600 | 23.400 | 18.035 | 0.000 | 58.035 |
| 7 | (United States) Logan Dooley | 16.000 | 23.100 | 16.760 | 0.000 | 55.860 |
| 8 | (Belarus) Uladzislau Hancharou | 7.900 | 9.600 | 7.295 | 0.000 | 24.795 |

=== Synchro ===
The men's synchro event was held on November 10.

| Position | Team | D Score | E Score | S Score | Pen. | Total |
|---|---|---|---|---|---|---|
| 1st place, gold medalist(s) | Japan; Manabu Yamaguchi; Yasuhiro Ueyama | 16.200 | 16.000 | 17.000 | 0.000 | 49.200 |
| 2nd place, silver medalist(s) | Russia; Mikhail Melnik; Sergei Azarian | 16.000 | 16.000 | 16.000 | 0.000 | 48.000 |
| 3rd place, bronze medalist(s) | Denmark; Peter Jensen; Christian Andersen | 14.800 | 14.900 | 18.200 | 0.000 | 47.900 |
| 4 | Canada; Keegan Soehn; Kyle Soehn | 14.800 | 14.900 | 14.600 | 0.000 | 44.300 |
| 5 | Portugal; Diogo Abreu; Tiago Lopes | 8.200 | 7.200 | 6.200 | 0.000 | 21.600 |
| 6 | Belarus; Uladzislau Hancharou; Mikalai Kazak | 5.500 | 4.600 | 5.200 | 0.000 | 15.300 |
| 7 | China; Gao Lei; He Yuxiang | 3.600 | 3.500 | 3.600 | 0.000 | 10.700 |
| 8 | Australia; William Morris; Blake Gaudry | 2.000 | 1.600 | 2.000 | 0.000 | 5.600 |

=== Trampoline Team ===
The men's trampoline team final was held on November 8.

| Rank | Team | Score |
|---|---|---|
| 1st place, gold medalist(s) | China | 177.555 |
| 1st place, gold medalist(s) | Tu Xiao | 59.725 |
| 1st place, gold medalist(s) | Dong Dong | 57.890 |
| 1st place, gold medalist(s) | Gao Lei | 59.940 |
| 1st place, gold medalist(s) | He Yuxiang | – |
| 2nd place, silver medalist(s) | Russia | 171.180 |
| 2nd place, silver medalist(s) | Mikhail Melnik | 58.115 |
| 2nd place, silver medalist(s) | Sergei Azarian | 56.325 |
| 2nd place, silver medalist(s) | Dmitry Ushakov | 56.740 |
| 2nd place, silver medalist(s) | Nikita Fedorenko | – |
| 3rd place, bronze medalist(s) | Australia | 126.390 |
| 3rd place, bronze medalist(s) | William Morris | 16.995 |
| 3rd place, bronze medalist(s) | Blake Gaudry | 54.940 |
| 3rd place, bronze medalist(s) | Ty Swadling | 54.455 |
| 4 | Japan | 125.245 |
| 4 | Tetsuya Sotomura | 58.195 |
| 4 | Yasuhiro Ueyama | 11.625 |
| 4 | Masaki Ito | 55.424 |
| 4 | Manabu Yamaguchi | – |
| 5 | Portugal | 78.820 |
| 5 | Tiago Lopes | 17.190 |
| 5 | Diogo Abreu | 55.290 |
| 5 | Diogo Ganchinho | 6.340 |
| 5 | Ricardo Santos | – |

=== Double Mini ===
The men's double mini event was held on November 10.

| Position | Gymnast | D Score | E Score | Penalty | Score 1 | D Score | E Score | Penalty | Score 2 | Total |
|---|---|---|---|---|---|---|---|---|---|---|
| 1st place, gold medalist(s) | (Russia) Mikhail Zalomin | 10.800 | 27.900 | 0.000 | 38.700 | 10.000 | 29.100 | 0.000 | 39.100 | 77.800 |
| 2nd place, silver medalist(s) | (United States) Alexander Renkert | 9.600 | 27.000 | 0.000 | 36.600 | 8.400 | 28.200 | 0.000 | 36.600 | 73.200 |
| 3rd place, bronze medalist(s) | (Portugal) Bruno Nobre | 7.600 | 27.300 | 0.000 | 34.900 | 7.600 | 26.700 | 0.000 | 34.300 | 69.200 |
| 4 | (United Kingdom) Nathaniel Scott | 8.700 | 25.800 | 0.000 | 34.500 | 6.800 | 27.600 | 0.000 | 34.400 | 68.900 |
| 5 | (Portugal) Andre Lico | 10.300 | 27.900 | 0.000 | 38.200 | 5.900 | 20.400 | 0.000 | 26.300 | 64.500 |
| 6 | (United States) Austin Nacey | 5.900 | 20.100 | 0.000 | 26.000 | 9.600 | 27.000 | 0.000 | 36.600 | 62.600 |
| 7 | (South Africa) Sebolai Tlaka | 8.900 | 26.700 | 0.000 | 35.600 | 0.000 | 0.000 | 0.000 | 0.000 | 35.600 |
| 8 | (Brazil) Bruno Martini | 0.000 | 0.000 | 0.000 | 0.000 | | | | | 0.000 |

=== Double Mini Team ===
The men's double mini team final was held on November 9.

| Rank | Team | Score |
|---|---|---|
| 1st place, gold medalist(s) | United States | 110.200 |
| 1st place, gold medalist(s) | Alexander Renkert | 36.500 |
| 1st place, gold medalist(s) | Ryan Roberts | 36.800 |
| 1st place, gold medalist(s) | Austin White | 36.900 |
| 1st place, gold medalist(s) | Austin Nacey | – |
| 2nd place, silver medalist(s) | Canada | 107.800 |
| 2nd place, silver medalist(s) | Dennis Oppenlander | 35.900 |
| 2nd place, silver medalist(s) | Denis Vachon | 37.700 |
| 2nd place, silver medalist(s) | Keegan Soehn | 34.200 |
| 2nd place, silver medalist(s) | Jonathon Schwaiger | – |
| 3rd place, bronze medalist(s) | Great Britain | 106.500 |
| 3rd place, bronze medalist(s) | Peter Cracknell | 36.300 |
| 3rd place, bronze medalist(s) | Matthew Swaffer | 35.000 |
| 3rd place, bronze medalist(s) | Nathaniel Scott | 35.200 |
| 3rd place, bronze medalist(s) | Rhys Gray | – |
| 4 | Russia | 102.500 |
| 4 | Alexander Zebrov | 38.500 |
| 4 | Andrey Gladenkov | 24.400 |
| 4 | Mikhail Zalomin | 39.600 |
| 4 | Evgeny Chernoivanov | – |
| 5 | Portugal | 101.200 |
| 5 | Bruno Nobre | 24.400 |
| 5 | André Fernandes | 38.000 |
| 5 | André Lico | 38.800 |
| 5 | Tiago Lopes | – |

=== Tumbling ===
The men's tumbling event was held on November 10.

| Position | Gymnast | D Score | E Score | Penalty | Score 1 | D Score | E Score | Penalty | Score 2 | Total |
|---|---|---|---|---|---|---|---|---|---|---|
| 1st place, gold medalist(s) | (United Kingdom) Kristof Willerton | 10.900 | 27.300 | 0.000 | 38.200 | 9.100 | 27.600 | 0.000 | 36.700 | 74.900 |
| 2nd place, silver medalist(s) | (Russia) Tagir Murtazaev | 11.300 | 26.700 | 0.000 | 38.000 | 11.600 | 25.200 | 0.000 | 36.800 | 74.800 |
| 3rd place, bronze medalist(s) | (Russia) Grigory Noskov | 10.700 | 26.400 | 0.000 | 37.100 | 11.600 | 25.500 | 0.000 | 37.100 | 74.200 |
| 4 | (China) Lin Qite | 9.600 | 27.600 | 0.000 | 37.200 | 10.000 | 26.100 | 0.000 | 36.100 | 73.300 |
| 5 | (United States) Austin Nacey | 8.500 | 25.800 | 0.000 | 34.300 | 8.700 | 25.500 | 0.000 | 34.200 | 68.500 |
| 6 | (Canada) Vincent Lavoie | 8.800 | 25.500 | 0.000 | 34.300 | 8.200 | 25.800 | 0.000 | 34.000 | 68.300 |
| 7 | (China) Zhang Luo | 9.200 | 27.600 | 0.000 | 36.800 | 6.800 | 24.600 | 0.000 | 31.400 | 68.200 |
| 8 | (United Kingdom) Greg Townley | 6.400 | 24.300 | 0.000 | 30.700 | 9.900 | 26.700 | 0.000 | 36.600 | 67.300 |

=== Tumbling Team ===
The men's tumbling team final was held on November 9.

| Rank | Team | Score |
|---|---|---|
| 1st place, gold medalist(s) | Russia | 110.700 |
| 1st place, gold medalist(s) | Tagir Murtazaev | 37.000 |
| 1st place, gold medalist(s) | Alexander Bezyulev | 35.700 |
| 1st place, gold medalist(s) | Grigory Noskov | 38.000 |
| 1st place, gold medalist(s) | Alexander Mironov | – |
| 2nd place, silver medalist(s) | China | 109.900 |
| 2nd place, silver medalist(s) | Liu Longji | 37.200 |
| 2nd place, silver medalist(s) | Yang Song | 38.000 |
| 2nd place, silver medalist(s) | Zhang Luo | 34.700 |
| 2nd place, silver medalist(s) | Lin Qite | – |
| 3rd place, bronze medalist(s) | Great Britain | 106.400 |
| 3rd place, bronze medalist(s) | Daniel Lannigan | 32.800 |
| 3rd place, bronze medalist(s) | Greg Townley | 37.200 |
| 3rd place, bronze medalist(s) | Kristof Willerton | 36.400 |
| 3rd place, bronze medalist(s) | Abdullah Izzidien | – |
| 4 | Kazakhstan | 104.300 |
| 4 | Zukhriddin Imamov | 35.400 |
| 4 | Oleg Sapeshko | 34.400 |
| 4 | Rakhat Yedilbayev | 34.500 |
| 4 | Yuriy Kossaurov | – |
| 5 | United States | 102.300 |
| 5 | Garret Waterstradt | 32.600 |
| 5 | Alexander Renkert | 35.300 |
| 5 | Austin Nacey | 34.400 |

== Women's results ==
=== Individual Trampoline ===
Qualification

| Rank | Gymnast | Note |
|---|---|---|
| 1 | Wenna He (CHN) | |
| 2 | Rosannagh Maclennan (CAN) | |
| 3 | Xingping Zhong (CHN) | |
| 4 | Emma Smith (GBR) | |
| 5 | Tatsiana Piatrenia (BLR) | |
| 6 | Samantha Sendel (CAN) | |
| 7 | Katherine Driscoll (GBR) | |
| 8 | Dan Li (CHN) | |
| 9 | Nataliia Moskvina (UKR) | |
| 10 | Laura Gallagher (GBR) | |
| 11 | Hanna Harchonak (BLR) | |
| 12 | Bryony Page (GBR) | |
| 13 | Irina Kundius (RUS) | |
| 14 | Ana Rente (POR) | |
| 15 | Ekaterina Khilko (UZB) | |
| 16 | Anna Kornetskaya (RUS) | |
| 17 | Charlotte Drury (USA) | |
| 18 | Samantha Smith (CAN) | |
| 19 | Zita Frydrychova (CZE) | |
| 20 | Anna Kasparyan (UZB) | |
| 21 | Marine Jurbert (FRA) | |
| 22 | Maryia Lon (BLR) | |
| 23 | Ayano Kishi (JPN) | |
| 24 | Anna Tarnovska (UKR) | |
| 25 | Shaylee Dunavin (USA) | |
| 26 | Cristina Sainz Bernabeu (ESP) | |
| 27 | Camilla Gomes (BRA) | |
| 28 | Simone Scherer (SUI) | |
| 29 | Deana Parris (USA) | |
| 30 | Hayley Butcher (USA) | |
| 31 | Diana Kliuchnyk (UKR) | |
| 32 | Luba Golovina (GEO) | |
| 33 | Fanny Chilo (SUI) | |
| 34 | Justine Brodelet (BEL) | |
| 35 | Joana Di Carlo Conde Perez (BRA) | |
| 36 | Oceane Coudert (FRA) | |
| 37 | Gemma Samantha Zamudio Gomez (MEX) | |
| 38 | Joelle Vallez (FRA) | |
| 39 | Beatriz Martins (POR) | |
| 40 | Leonie Adam (GER) | |
| 41 | Lingling Liu (CHN) | |
| 42 | Tamari Kakashvili (GEO) | |
| 43 | Andrea Pinzon Tron (MEX) | |
| 44 | Yuna Sato (JPN) | |
| 45 | Lina Sjoeberg (SWE) | |
| 46 | Marianela Galli (ARG) | |
| 47 | Malak Nassif (EGY) | |
| 48 | Alejandra Fernandez Lomeli (MEX) | |
| 49 | Victoria Voronina (RUS) | |
| 50 | Sylvie Wirth (SUI) | |
| 51 | Olena Syvanych (UKR) | |
| 52 | Sviatlana Makshtarova (BLR) | |
| 53 | Kirsten Boersma (NED) | |
| 54 | Yana Pavlova (RUS) | |
| 55 | Giovanna Venetiglio Bastos Matheus (BRA) | |
| 56 | Silvia Saiote (POR) | |
| 57 | Kazuyo Minato (JPN) | |
| 58 | Mara Colombo (ARG) | |
| 59 | Sarah Eckes (GER) | |
| 60 | Hitomi Tomita (JPN) | |

Final

The women's individual trampoline event was held on November 10.

| Rank | Gymnast | D Score | E Score | T Score | Pen. | Total |
|---|---|---|---|---|---|---|
| 1st place, gold medalist(s) | (Canada) Rosannagh MacLennan | 15.400 | 24.600 | 16.285 | 0.000 | 56.285 |
| 2nd place, silver medalist(s) | (China) Zhong Xingping | 14.400 | 25.500 | 16.265 | 0.000 | 56.165 |
| 3rd place, bronze medalist(s) | (China) Li Dan | 15.000 | 24.900 | 16.245 | 0.000 | 56.145 |
| 4 | (Belarus) Hanna Harchonak | 13.100 | 25.200 | 15.950 | 0.000 | 54.250 |
| 5 | (Canada) Samantha Sendel | 15.200 | 22.800 | 15.560 | 0.000 | 53.560 |
| 6 | (Ukraine) Nataliia Moskvina | 14.000 | 21.600 | 15.265 | 0.000 | 50.865 |
| 7 | (United Kingdom) Kat Driscoll | 11.900 | 22.800 | 16.005 | 0.000 | 50.705 |
| 8 | (United Kingdom) Emma Smith | 2.000 | 2.700 | 1.745 | 0.000 | 6.445 |

=== Synchro ===
The women's synchro final was held on November 9.

| Position | Team | D Score | E Score | S Score | Pen. | Total |
|---|---|---|---|---|---|---|
| 1st place, gold medalist(s) | Great Britain; Kat Driscoll; Amanda Parker | 13.300 | 15.600 | 18.600 | 0.000 | 47.500 |
| 2nd place, silver medalist(s) | China; Li Dan; Zhong Xingping | 13.000 | 16.300 | 17.800 | 0.000 | 47.100 |
| 3rd place, bronze medalist(s) | Ukraine; Diana Kliuchnyk; Nataliia Moskvina | 13.100 | 15.000 | 18.600 | 0.000 | 46.700 |
| 4 | Belarus; Hanna Harchonak; Maryia Lon | 12.200 | 15.500 | 18.000 | 0.000 | 45.700 |
| 5 | Uzbekistan; Anna Kasparyan; Ekaterina Khliko | 13.100 | 15.000 | 17.200 | 0.000 | 45.300 |
| 6 | Russia; Anna Kornetskaya; Anastasia Velichko | 12.000 | 14.800 | 18.200 | 0.000 | 45.000 |
| 7 | United States; Charlotte Drury; Shaylee Dunavin | 2.900 | 3.000 | 3.400 | 0.000 | 9.300 |
| 8 | Canada; Samantha Sendel; Rosie MacLennan | 2.000 | 1.600 | 2.000 | 0.000 | 5.600 |

=== Trampoline Team ===
The women's trampoline team final was held on November 8.

| Rank | Team | Score |
|---|---|---|
| 1st place, gold medalist(s) | Great Britain | 164.845 |
| 1st place, gold medalist(s) | Emma Smith | 55.840 |
| 1st place, gold medalist(s) | Laura Gallagher | 55.280 |
| 1st place, gold medalist(s) | Kat Driscoll | 53.725 |
| 1st place, gold medalist(s) | Bryony Page | – |
| 2nd place, silver medalist(s) | Canada | 159.995 |
| 2nd place, silver medalist(s) | Samantha Smith | 52.540 |
| 2nd place, silver medalist(s) | Samantha Sendel | 52.955 |
| 2nd place, silver medalist(s) | Rosie MacLennan | 54.500 |
| 3rd place, bronze medalist(s) | Belarus | 158.450 |
| 3rd place, bronze medalist(s) | Hanna Harchonak | 51.960 |
| 3rd place, bronze medalist(s) | Sviatlana Makshtarova | 52.610 |
| 3rd place, bronze medalist(s) | Tatsiana Piatrenia | 53.880 |
| 3rd place, bronze medalist(s) | Mariya Lon | – |
| 4 | Ukraine | 131.430 |
| 4 | Olena Syvanych | 41.930 |
| 4 | Anna Tarnovska | 35.350 |
| 4 | Nataliia Moskvina | 54.150 |
| 4 | Diana Kliuchnyk | – |
| 5 | China | 113.520 |
| 5 | He Wenna | 55.780 |
| 5 | Zhong Xingping | 29.040 |
| 5 | Li Dan | 28.700 |
| 5 | Liu Lingling | – |

=== Double Mini ===
The women's double mini event was held on November 10.

| Position | Gymnast | D Score | E Score | Penalty | Score 1 | D Score | E Score | Penalty | Score 2 | Total |
|---|---|---|---|---|---|---|---|---|---|---|
| 1st place, gold medalist(s) | (United States) Kristle Lowell | 7.600 | 27.900 | 0.000 | 35.500 | 6.800 | 28.800 | 0.000 | 35.600 | 71.100 |
| 2nd place, silver medalist(s) | (Russia) Svetlana Balandina | 6.800 | 27.900 | 0.000 | 34.700 | 6.800 | 28.500 | 0.000 | 35.300 | 70.000 |
| 3rd place, bronze medalist(s) | (United Kingdom) Jasmin Short | 6.800 | 27.600 | 0.000 | 34.400 | 7.200 | 27.000 | 0.000 | 34.200 | 68.600 |
| 4 | (United States) Erin Jauch | 6.000 | 28.500 | 0.000 | 34.500 | 7.200 | 26.700 | 0.000 | 33.900 | 68.400 |
| 5 | (Canada) Corissa Boychuk | 5.600 | 28.500 | 0.000 | 34.100 | 6.800 | 27.300 | 0.000 | 34.100 | 68.200 |
| 6 | (Canada) Alexandria Giesbrecht | 6.400 | 26.400 | 0.000 | 32.800 | 5.600 | 28.200 | 0.000 | 33.800 | 66.600 |
| 7 | (Portugal) Mafalda Prazeres | 5.600 | 27.300 | 0.000 | 32.900 | 4.800 | 28.200 | 0.000 | 33.000 | 65.900 |
| 8 | (Brazil) Mariana Carvalho | 6.000 | 27.000 | 0.000 | 33.000 | 5.200 | 25.500 | 0.000 | 30.700 | 63.700 |

=== Double Mini Team ===
The women's double mini team final was held on November 9.

| Rank | Team | Score |
|---|---|---|
| 1st place, gold medalist(s) | United States | 104.400 |
| 1st place, gold medalist(s) | Erin Jauch | 36.000 |
| 1st place, gold medalist(s) | Tristan van Natta | 32.900 |
| 1st place, gold medalist(s) | Kristle Lowell | 35.500 |
| 1st place, gold medalist(s) | Shelby Gill | – |
| 2nd place, silver medalist(s) | Canada | 102.200 |
| 2nd place, silver medalist(s) | Corissa Boychuk | 34.200 |
| 2nd place, silver medalist(s) | Tamara O'Brien | 33.400 |
| 2nd place, silver medalist(s) | Alexandria Giesbrecht | 34.600 |
| 2nd place, silver medalist(s) | Pamela Kriangkum | – |
| 3rd place, bronze medalist(s) | Russia | 101.600 |
| 3rd place, bronze medalist(s) | Anastasiia Ignateva | 33.700 |
| 3rd place, bronze medalist(s) | Polina Troianova | 33.900 |
| 3rd place, bronze medalist(s) | Svetlana Balandina | 34.000 |
| 3rd place, bronze medalist(s) | Daria Romanova | – |
| 4 | Portugal | 99.300 |
| 4 | Joana da Silva Pereira | 33.700 |
| 4 | Mafalda Prazeres | 34.200 |
| 4 | Silvia Saiote | 31.300 |
| 4 | Ana Robalo | – |
| 5 | Great Britain | 98.800 |
| 5 | Gemma Osborne | 32.500 |
| 5 | Georgia Downing | 32.800 |
| 5 | Jasmin Short | 33.500 |

=== Tumbling ===
The women's individual tumbling final was held on November 10.

| Position | Gymnast | D Score | E Score | Penalty | Score 1 | D Score | E Score | Penalty | Score 2 | Total |
|---|---|---|---|---|---|---|---|---|---|---|
| 1st place, gold medalist(s) | (China) Jia Fangfang | 6.400 | 28.500 | 0.000 | 34.900 | 7.900 | 27.900 | 0.000 | 35.800 | 70.700 |
| 2nd place, silver medalist(s) | (United Kingdom) Lucie Colebeck | 7.200 | 26.400 | 0.000 | 33.600 | 6.500 | 27.300 | 0.000 | 33.800 | 67.400 |
| 3rd place, bronze medalist(s) | (China) Chen Lingxi | 6.400 | 27.600 | 0.000 | 34.000 | 6.300 | 26.700 | 0.000 | 33.000 | 67.000 |
| 4 | (Russia) Anastasiia Isupova | 6.500 | 26.400 | 0.000 | 32.900 | 6.500 | 25.500 | 0.000 | 32.000 | 64.900 |
| 5 | (Russia) Ekaterina Gaas | 6.100 | 26.100 | 0.000 | 33.200 | 6.200 | 26.100 | 0.000 | 32.300 | 64.500 |
| 6 | (United States) Yuliya Stankevich | 6.400 | 25.800 | 0.000 | 32.200 | 4.600 | 26.400 | 0.000 | 31.000 | 63.200 |
| 7 | (United Kingdom) Rachael Letsche | 7.100 | 26.400 | 0.000 | 33.500 | 1.900 | 27.600 | 0.000 | 29.500 | 63.000 |
| 8 | (Canada) Katelyn Verschoor | 3.900 | 24.600 | 0.000 | 28.500 | 4.700 | 25.500 | 0.000 | 30.200 | 58.700 |

=== Tumbling Team ===
The women's tumbling team final was held on November 9.

| Rank | Team | Score |
|---|---|---|
| 1st place, gold medalist(s) | China | 104.400 |
| 1st place, gold medalist(s) | Jia Fangfang | 36.100 |
| 1st place, gold medalist(s) | Chen Lingxi | 34.300 |
| 1st place, gold medalist(s) | Cai Qizi | 34.000 |
| 1st place, gold medalist(s) | Zhang Yuanyuan | – |
| 2nd place, silver medalist(s) | Russia | 99.600 |
| 2nd place, silver medalist(s) | Victoria Danilenko | 33.400 |
| 2nd place, silver medalist(s) | Ekaterina Gaas | 33.300 |
| 2nd place, silver medalist(s) | Anastasiia Isupova | 32.900 |
| 2nd place, silver medalist(s) | Anzhelika Soldatkina | – |
| 3rd place, bronze medalist(s) | Great Britain | 98.000 |
| 3rd place, bronze medalist(s) | Yasmin Taite | 31.600 |
| 3rd place, bronze medalist(s) | Rachael Letsche | 34.100 |
| 3rd place, bronze medalist(s) | Lucie Colebeck | 32.300 |
| 3rd place, bronze medalist(s) | Jennifer Dawes | – |
| 4 | Ukraine | 92.900 |
| 4 | Ruslana Petrenko | 30.500 |
| 4 | Darya Alyeksyeyeva | 31.000 |
| 4 | Kateryna Bayeva | 31.400 |
| 4 | Olena Orlova | – |
| 5 | Canada | 91.500 |
| 5 | Emily Smith | 32.200 |
| 5 | Jordan Sugrim | 30.000 |
| 5 | Katelyn Verschoor | 29.300 |
