= Blake Gaudry =

Australian trampoline gymnast

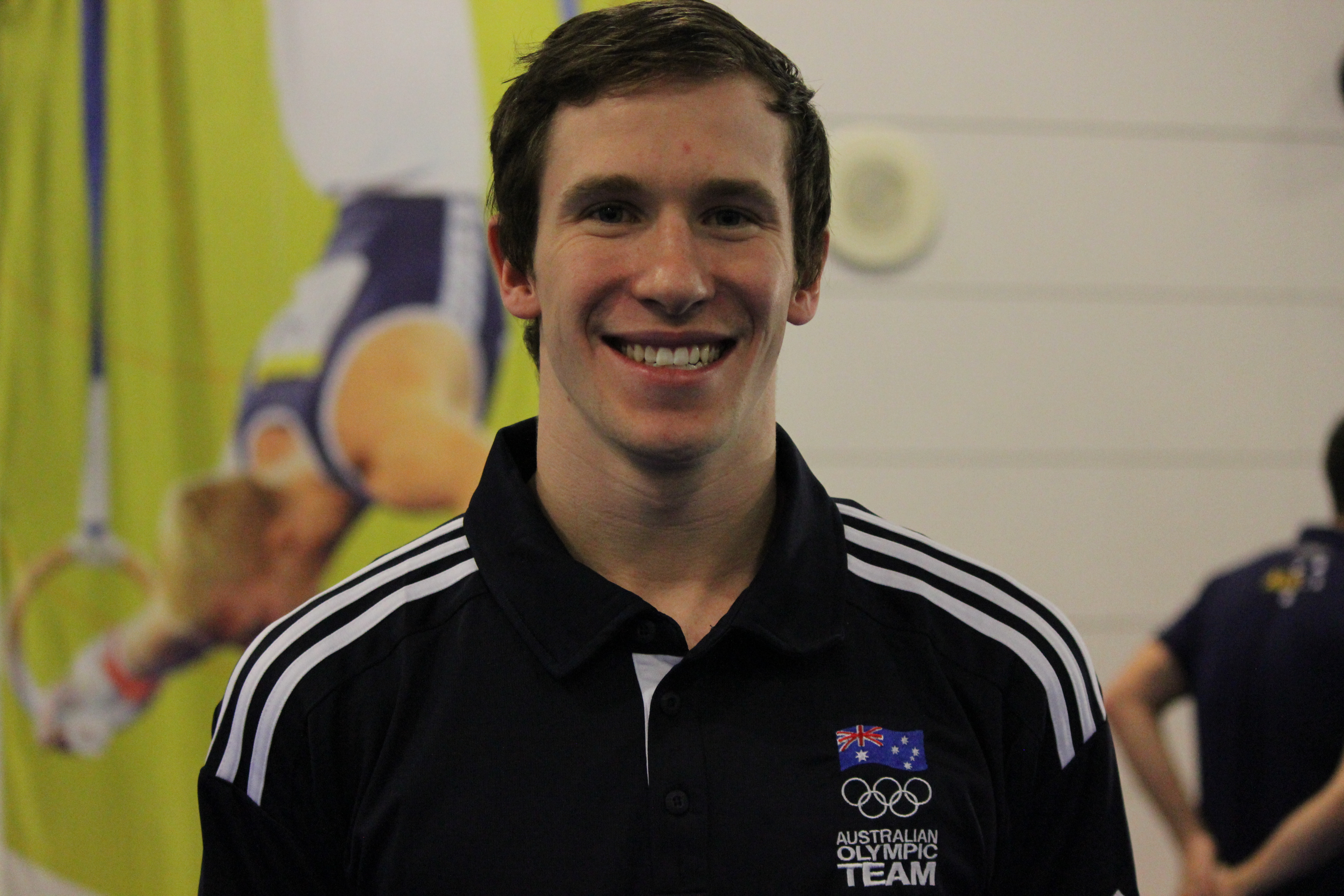
- Gaudry at the Australian Institute of Sport

Personal information
- Born: 29 November 1991 (age 34) Baulkham Hills, New South Wales.

Gymnastics career
- Discipline: Trampoline gymnastics
- Country represented: Australia
- Club: SASI/T-Jets
Medal record
Men's trampoline gymnastics
Representing Australia
World Championships
Bronze medal – third place	2013 Sofia	Team
Pacific Rim Championships
Gold medal – first place	2012 Everett	Synchro
Gold medal – first place	2012 Everett	Team
Bronze medal – third place	2014 Richmond	Synchro
Bronze medal – third place	2014 Richmond	Team

Blake Gaudry (born 29 November 1991) is an Australian trampoline gymnast. He was the Australian trampoline champion in 2009, 2010, 2012, 2013, 2014, 2015 and 2016, and the national champion in the synchro event in 2009, 2010, 2011, 2013 and 2014. He was selected to represent Australia at the 2012 and 2016 Summer Olympics in the event.

== Personal ==
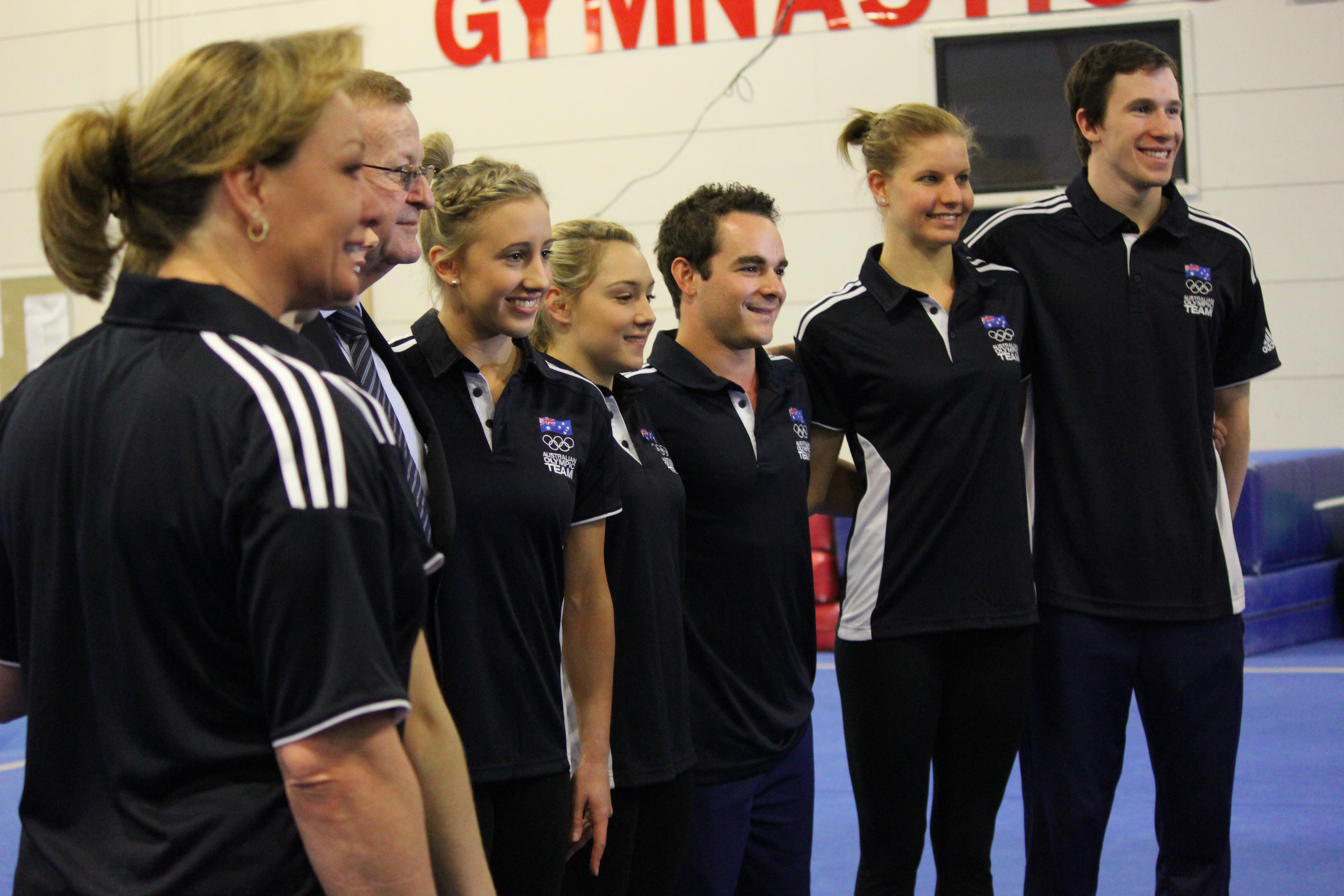
Gaudry with Olympic teammates and the AOC President John Coates.

Gaudry was born on 29 November 1991 in Baulkham Hills, New South Wales. He lived in Seven Hills, New South Wales for fifteen years, but considers Seaton, South Australia his hometown. His parents are Noreen and Brian. He has three sisters, Emma, Melissa and Rachel Gaudry.

== Trampoline ==
Gaudry started gymnastics in 2002 as a ten-year-old, and enjoys the thrill and adrenaline aspects of it. He has set a goal of earning a medal at the 2016 Summer Olympics. His first coach was Sarah Barnitt at the Castle Hill gymnastics club. While living in Seven Hills, he was coached by Michelle Olsen. Belinda Wakeham from Ryde RSL Trampoline Club then became his coach before Gaudry moved to Adelaide. He has been on scholarship for the trampoline at the South Australian Sports Institute in Adelaide for four years, where he is coached by Nikolay Zhuralev, trains at the State Aquatic Centre and represents the Institute and T-Jets in club competitions.

At the national level, Gaudry was the Australian champion in 2009, 2010 and 2012. In 2011, he finished seventh. In the 2007 Junior Australian championships, he finished eighth. He was the national champion in the synchro event in 2009, 2010, and 2011. Gaudry competed at the 2009, 2010 and 2011 World Championships where he finished 51st, 18th and 16th respectively. At the 2010 event, he also participated in the synchronised event with Ben Wilden; the team finished in 12th place. At the 2011 event, he was also part of the synchronised team that finished in 21st, with William Morris, and the Australian team which finished in 9th. At the 2012 Pacific Rim Championships he finished first in the synchro event.

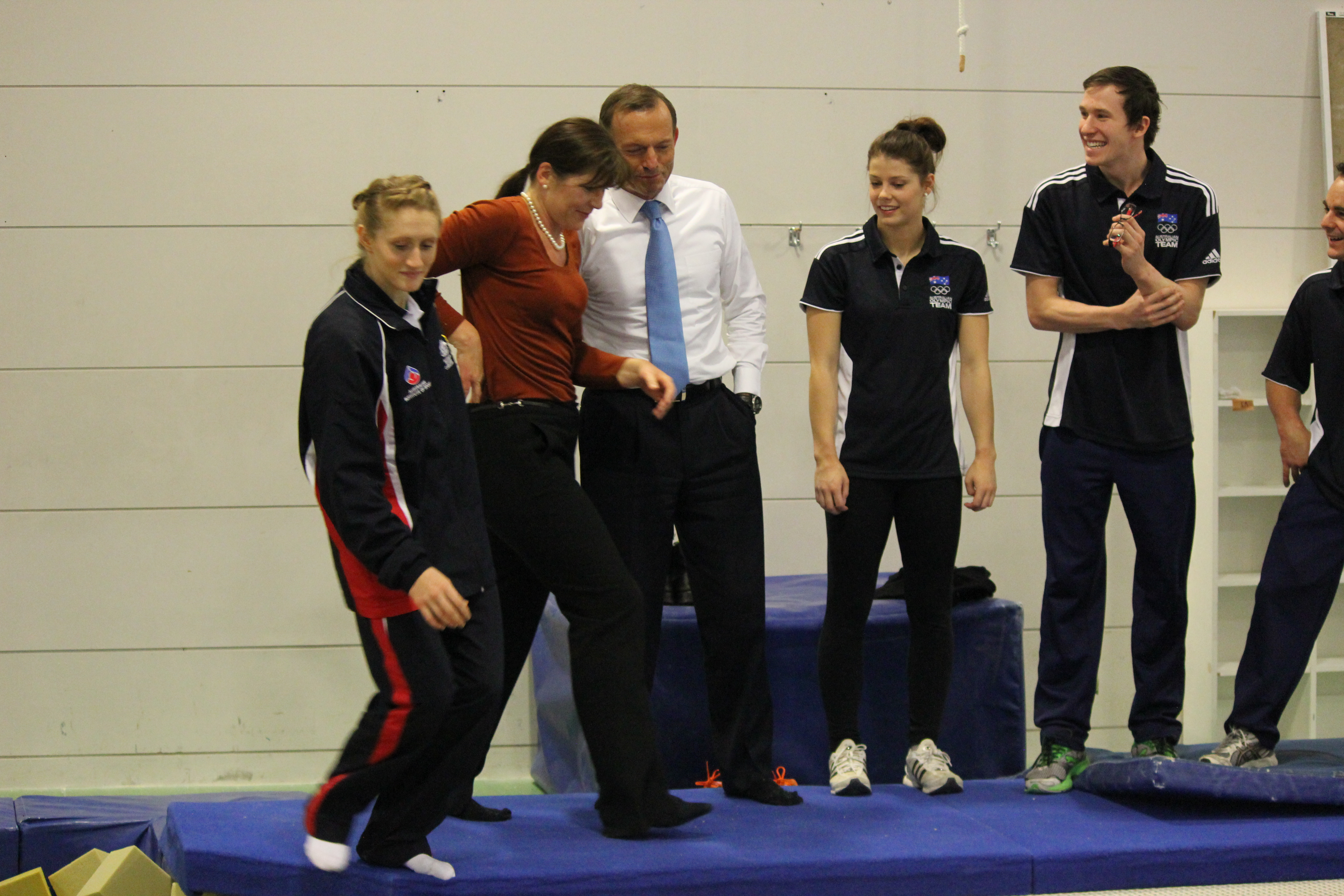
Gaudry with Olympic team mates, Tony Abbott and Kate Lundy at the Australian Institute of Sport.

In January 2012 at the Olympic Test event in London, his fifth-place finish earned Australia an Olympic spot. He then earned his own spot at the national championships in June.

Gaudry represented Australia at the 2012 Summer Olympics in men's trampoline, and was Australia's only trampoline competitor. His family had to pay A$240 a ticket to watch him in London as Gymnastics Australia was only able to secure two tickets per gymnast. Gaudry was chosen with 3 other Olympic athletes to meet Prince Charles and the Duchess of Cornwall at the beginning of the men's road cycling race at the 2012 London Olympics.

At the 2012 Summer Olympics, he finished in 13th place. In the process, he set a new personal best, and his routine set an Olympic record for highest degree of difficulty in a set routine with 49.260.

The 2013 World Championships saw the Australian men's team win a bronze medal, the first men's team medal since 1984. The team consisted of Gaudry, Ty Swadling and William Morris. As well as this, Gaudry finished 8th in the synchronised event (with Morris) and 20th in the individual event.

In 2014, he competed at the FIG World Championships, where he finished 50th in the individual, and in 27th in the synchronised event (with Jack Penny).

In 2015, he competed at the FIG World Championships, where he finished 14th in the individual, and Australia finished in 9th in the team event.

He qualified for the 2016 Olympics, and was again Australia's only representative in trampolining. He qualified through his performance at Aquece Test Event in Rio. Earlier in 2016, he won his seventh national title. At the Olympics, he again finished in 13th.

In 2017, he competed at the FIG World Championships, where he finished 29th in the individual, 12th in the synchronised event (with Dominic Clarke) and Australia finished in 6th in the team event.
