= Trampoline gymnastics at the 2017 World Games =

- Venue: Centennial Hall
- Dates: 24–26 July 2017
- Competitors: 78 from 22 nations

The trampoline gymnastics tournaments at the 2017 World Games in Wrocław were contested between 24 and 26 July. 78 trampoline gymnastics competitors, from 22 nations, participated in the tournament. The trampoline gymnastics competition took place at Centennial Hall in Lower Silesian Voivodeship. It served as a qualifying event for the 2020 Summer Olympics in Tokyo, Japan.

== Schedule ==
Q	Qualification	F	Final

Centennial Hall
Event↓/Date →	Monday 24		Tuesday 25		Wednesday 26	
Men's synchronized trampoline	Q	F				
Men's double mini-trampoline			Q	F		
Women's tumbling			Q	F		
Men's tumbling					Q	F
Women's synchronized trampoline					Q	F
Women's double mini-trampoline					Q	F

== Participating nations ==
The 78 trampoline gymnastics competitors, from 22 nations, participated in the tournament.

- Australia (4)
- Azerbaijan (3)
- Belgium (1)
- Brazil (1)
- Bulgaria (2)
- Canada (3)
- China (6)
- Denmark (1)
- France (3)
- Great Britain (4)
- Japan (4)
- Kazakhstan (1)
- Netherlands (2)
- New Zealand (1)
- Poland (2) (hosts)
- Portugal (7)
- Russia (9)
- South Africa (2)
- Spain (3)
- Sweden (1)
- Ukraine (6)
- United States (8)

== Medal table ==
Rank	Nation	Gold	Silver	Bronze	Total
1	China	3	0	0	3
2	United States	1	2	0	3
3	Russia	1	1	1	3
4	Ukraine	1	1	0	2
5	Azerbaijan	0	1	0	1
5	Canada	0	1	0	1
7	Great Britain	0	0	1	1
7	Japan	0	0	1	1
7	Netherlands	0	0	1	1
7	Portugal	0	0	1	1
7	Sweden	0	0	1	1
Totals (11 entries)		6	6	6	18

== Events ==
=== Men ===
Event	Gold	Silver	Bronze
Synchronized trampoline	China; Tu Xiao; Dong Dong	Ukraine; Mykola Prostorov; Dmytro Byedyevkin	Japan; Takato Nakazono; Yamato Ishikawa
Double mini-trampoline	Russia; Mikhail Zalomin	United States; Alexander Renkert	Portugal; Diogo Carvalho Costa
Tumbling	China; Zhang Luo	United States; Austin Nacey	Russia; Maxim Shlyakin

=== Women ===
Event	Gold	Silver	Bronze
Synchronized trampoline	Ukraine; Nataliia Moskvina; Svitlana Malkova	Azerbaijan; Sviatlana Makshtarova; Veronika Zemlianaia	Netherlands; Tara Fokke; Carlijn Blekkink
Double mini-trampoline	United States; Paige Howard	Canada; Tamara O'Brien	Sweden; Lina Sjöberg
Tumbling	China; Jia Fangfang	Russia; Anna Korobeinikova	Great Britain; Lucie Colebeck

== See also ==
- Gymnastics at the 2016 Summer Olympics
- Trampoline World Championships
