= Ayano Kishi =

Japanese trampoline gymnast

- Full name: Ayano Sakano
- Born: 29 October 1992 (age 34) Musashino, Japan
- Height: 154 cm (5 ft 1 in)

Gymnastics career
- Discipline: Trampoline gymnastics
- Country represented: Japan
- Head coach: Akiko Furu
Medal record
Women's trampoline gymnastics
Representing Japan
World Championships
Gold medal – first place	2019 Tokyo	Synchro
Silver medal – second place	2017 Sofia	Individual
Asian Games
Bronze medal – third place	2014 Incheon	Individual
Pacific Rim Championships
Silver medal – second place	2014 Richmond	Synchro
Bronze medal – third place	2014 Richmond	Team
Bronze medal – third place	2014 Richmond	Individual

Ayano Kishi (岸 彩乃, Kishi Ayano; born 29 October 1992) is a Japanese former trampoline gymnast. She is the 2019 World champion in the synchronized event and the 2017 World silver medalist in the individual event. She won a bronze medal at the 2014 Asian Games and represented Japan at the 2012 Summer Olympics.

== Gymnastics career ==
Kishi began trampoline gymnastics at five years old because of her father, who competed in national-level gymnastics competitions. Her younger brother is Daiki Kishi, who trained alongside her and went on to compete at the 2020 Summer Olympics.

At the 2011 World Championships, Kishi finished 19th in the individual qualification round. She then finished tenth at the 2012 Olympic Test Event and qualified for the 2012 Summer Olympics. There, she finished 14th in the qualifications and did not advance into the final.

Kishi won a bronze medal in the synchro event at the 2013 Loulé World Cup, competing with Yuna Sato. She did not qualify for the individual final at the 2013 World Championships, finishing 23rd. At the 2014 Pacific Rim Championships, she won a bronze medal in the individual event, behind Rosie MacLennan and Liu Lingling. She then represented Japan at the 2014 Asian Games and won the individual bronze medal behind China's Li Dan and Zhong Xingping. She did not qualify for the 2016 Summer Olympics.

At the 2017 World Championships, Kishi won a silver medal in the individual event, behind Tatsiana Piatrenia. This marked the first time Japan won a World medal in women's individual trampoline. She competed with Yumi Takagi in the synchro event at the 2019 Minsk World Cup and won a silver medal. They then won the gold medal at the Khabarovsk World Cup. At the 2019 World Championships, Kishi and Takagi won the gold medal.

After not being selected to compete at the 2020 Summer Olympics, Kishi announced her retirement and began coaching.
