= Gymnastics at the 2020 Summer Olympics – Men's trampoline =

Men's trampoline at the Games of the XXXII Olympiad
- Venue: Ariake Gymnastics Centre
- Date: 31 July 2021
- Competitors: 16 from 12 nations

Medalists
1st place, gold medalist(s)		Ivan Litvinovich	Belarus
2nd place, silver medalist(s)		Dong Dong	China
3rd place, bronze medalist(s)		Dylan Schmidt	New Zealand

The men's trampoline competition at the 2020 Summer Olympics took place on 31 July 2021 at the Ariake Gymnastics Centre.

== Schedule ==
All times are in Japan Standard Time (UTC+9)

Date	Time	Round
Saturday, 31 July 2021	13:00	Qualifications
Saturday, 31 July 2021	14:50	Finals

== Results ==
=== Qualification ===
Rank	Athlete	Nation	1st routine	2nd routine	Total	Notes
1	Ivan Litvinovich	Belarus	53.515	60.040	113.555	Q
2	Uladzislau Hancharou	Belarus	53.180	60.220	113.400	Q
3	Dylan Schmidt	New Zealand	52.415	59.705	112.120	Q
4	Dominic Clarke	Australia	52.130	59.550	111.680	Q
5	Dong Dong	China	52.275	59.375	111.650	Q
6	Daiki Kishi	Japan	52.205	59.335	111.540	Q
7	Andrey Yudin	ROC	51.770	59.475	111.245	Q
8	Dmitry Ushakov	ROC	49.795	59.690	109.485	Q
9	Ángel Hernández	Colombia	51.350	54.580	105.930	R1
10	Seif Sherif	Egypt	45.810	50.380	96.190	R2
11	Diogo Abreu	Portugal	52.135	41.285	93.420	
12	Mykola Prostorov	Ukraine	51.385	41.185	92.570	
13	Aliaksei Shostak	United States	51.165	30.985	82.150	
14	Gao Lei	China	52.245	10.575	62.820	
15	Ryosuke Sakai	Japan	38.935	23.315	62.250	
16	Allan Morante	France	14.590	6.490	21.080	

== Final ==
Rank	Name	Difficulty	Execution	Flight	Horizontal Displacement	Penalty	Total
1st place, gold medalist(s)	Ivan Litvinovich (BLR)	18.200	16.500	17.915	9.100		61.715
2nd place, silver medalist(s)	Dong Dong (CHN)	17.800	16.600	17.135	9.700		61.235
3rd place, bronze medalist(s)	Dylan Schmidt (NZL)	17.800	16.300	16.975	9.600		60.675
4	Uladzislau Hancharou (BLR)	17.900	16.300	17.365	9.000		60.565
5	Dmitry Ushakov (ROC)	17.100	16.500	17.100	8.900		59.600
6	Andrey Yudin (ROC)	17.800	15.200	16.735	8.500		58.235
7	Daiki Kishi (JPN)	17.300	14.900	16.915	8.700		57.815
8	Dominic Clarke (AUS)	7.400	6.600	7.255	3.700		24.955
