= 2016 European Trampoline Championships =

2016 European Championships
- Location: Valladolid, Spain
- Dates: 31 March to 3 April 2016

The 25th European Trampoline Championships were held in Valladolid, Spain, from March 31 – April 3, 2016.

== Medal summary ==
=== Medal table ===
Rank	Nation	Gold	Silver	Bronze	Total
1	Russia	7	7	1	15
2	Great Britain	3	2	5	10
3	Belarus	2	2	0	4
4	France	1	0	1	2
5	Sweden	1	0	0	1
6	Portugal	0	1	3	4
7	Spain	0	1	2	3
8	Ukraine	0	1	1	2
9	Azerbaijan	0	0	1	1
9	Denmark	0	0	1	1
Totals (10 entries)		14	14	15	43

=== Results ===
Event	Gold	Silver	Bronze
Men
Individual Trampoline	Uladzislau Hancharou (BLR)	Dmitry Ushakov (RUS)	Nathan Bailey (GBR)
Synchro	Belarus; Uladzislau Hancharou; Mikalai Kazak	Ukraine; Mykola Prostorov; Dmitro Byedyevkin	Portugal; Diogo Abreu; Pedro Ferreira
Trampoline Team	Russia; Sergei Azarian; Dmitry Ushakov; Mikhail Mel'nik	Belarus; Uladzislau Hancharou; Mikalai Kazak; Artsiom Zhouk	Portugal; Diogo Abreu; Pedro Ferreira; Ricardo Santos; Diogo Ganchinho
Double Mini	Mikhail Zalomin (RUS)	Aleksandr Odintsov (RUS)	Dmitriy Fedorovskiy (AZE)
Double Mini Team	Russia; Aleksandr Zebrov; Andrei Gladenkov; Mikhail Zalomin	Portugal	Spain
Tumbling	Tagir Murtazaev (RUS)	Kristof Willerton (GBR)	Grigory Noskov (RUS)
Tumbling Team	Great Britain	Russia; Tagir Murtazaev; Timofei Podust; Grigory Noskov	Denmark
Women
Individual Trampoline	Yana Pavlova (RUS)	Hanna Harchonak (BLR)	Katherine Driscoll (GBR)
Synchro	France; Marine Jurbert; Lea Labrousse	Russia; Susana Kochesok; Anna Kornetskaya	Portugal; Ana Rente; Beatriz Martins; Ukraine; Marina Kiyko; Nataliya Moskvina
Trampoline Team	Great Britain; Bryony Page; Kat Driscoll; Pamela Clark; Amanda Parker	Russia; Yana Pavlova; Susana Kochesok; Vladislava Ryzhkova; Anna Kornetskaya	Spain; Claudia Prat; Cristina Sainz; Elvira Santiago; Cristina Masfret
Double Mini	Lina Sjöberg (SWE)	Polina Troianova (RUS)	Kirsty Way (GBR)
Double Mini Team	Russia; Polina Troianova; Anastasia Ignatieva; Vladislava Ryzhkova	Spain	Great Britain
Tumbling	Anna Korobeinikova (RUS)	Lucie Colebeck (GBR)	Rachel Davies (GBR)
Tumbling Team	Great Britain	Russia; Anna Korobeinikova; Anastasia Isupova; Natalia Parakhina	France
