= Andrey Yudin (trampoline gymnast) =

Russian trampoline gymnast

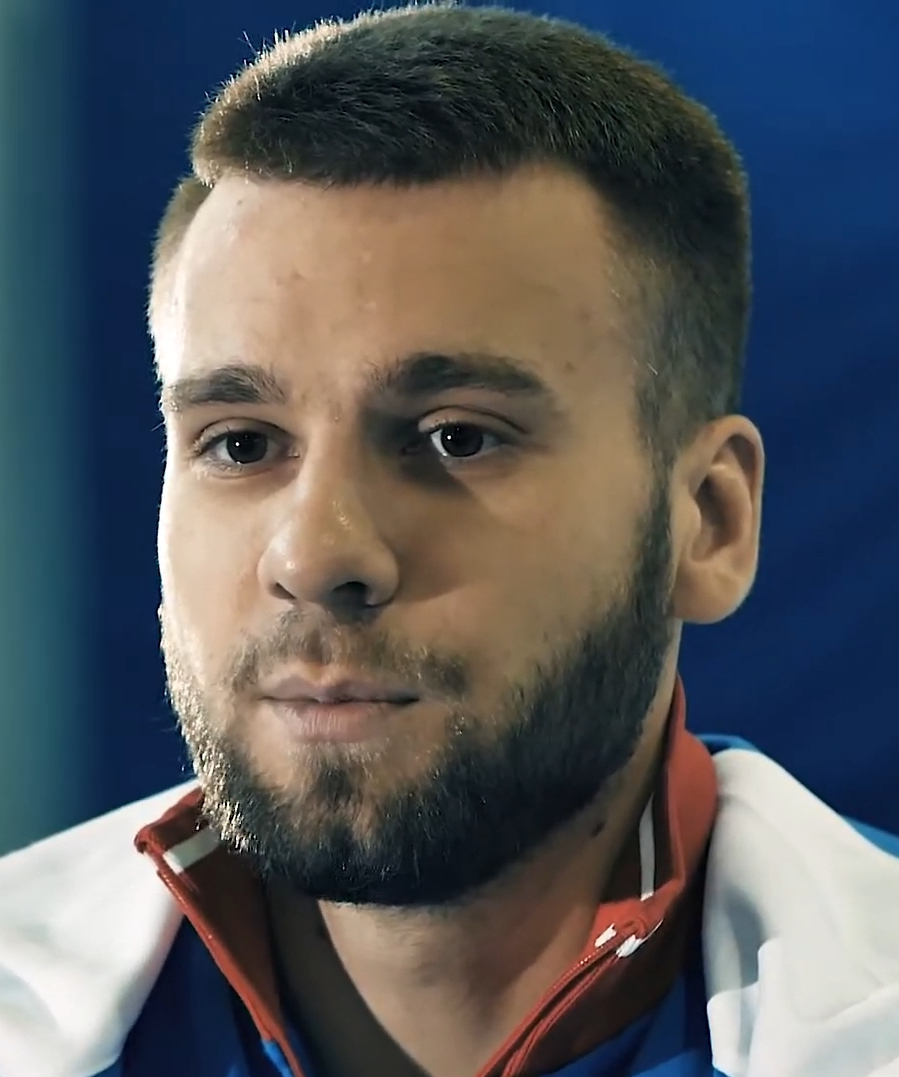
- Yudin in 2017

Personal information
- Full name: Andrey Dmitrievich Yudin
- Born: 6 June 1996 (age 30) Tolyatti, Samara Oblast, Russia
- Height: 175 cm (5 ft 9 in)

Gymnastics career
- Discipline: Trampoline gymnastics
- Country represented: Russia
- Club: CSKA Moscow
- Head coach: Andrey Kuzmin
- Assistant coach: Elena Dorofeyeva
Medal record
Men's trampoline gymnastics
Representing Russia
World Championships
Gold medal – first place	2015 Odense	Team
Silver medal – second place	2017 Sofia	Team
Bronze medal – third place	2015 Odense	Individual
Bronze medal – third place	2017 Sofia	Synchro
Bronze medal – third place	2018 Saint Petersburg	Individual
European Championships
Gold medal – first place	2014 Guimarães	Team
Bronze medal – third place	2021 Sochi	Individual
Pacific Rim Championships
Silver medal – second place	2012 Everett	Team

Andrey Dmitrievich Yudin (Russian: Андрей Дмитриевич Юдин; born 6 June 1996) is a Russian trampoline gymnast. He is the 2015 and 2018 World individual bronze medalist and the 2017 World synchro bronze medalist. He advanced to the trampoline finals at the 2016 and 2020 Summer Olympics.

== Career ==
Yudin began training in trampoline gymnastics in 2003.

At the 2012 Pacific Rim Championships, Yudin won a silver medal in the team event. He won a gold in the team event at the 2014 European Championships. He competed in his first Worlds at the 2014 World Championships in Daytona Beach, but did not advance beyond the individual semifinals.

At the 2015 World Championships, Yudin won a bronze medal in the individual event and a gold medal in the team competition. As a result, he qualified for the 2016 Summer Olympics. He competed for Russia at the 2016 Summer Olympics and advanced into the trampoline final. However, he was unable to complete his routine in the final and finished last. He considered retirement after this result and took two months off from training.

Yudin competed with Dmitry Ushakov at the 2017 World Championships, and they won the synchro bronze medal. Additionally, Yudin, Ushakov and Sergei Azarian won the team silver medal. He won the individual bronze medal at the 2018 World Championships behind Chinese athletes Gao Lei and Dong Dong.

Yudin began the 2019 season at the Baku World Cup and placed sixth. He then won the silver medal at the Minsk World Cup behind teammate Mikhail Melnik. He then represented Russia at the 2019 European Games and placed seventh in the synchro final alongside Melnik. At the 2019 World Championships, he won a bronze medal in the trampoline team event.

Yudin won the individual bronze medal at the 2021 European Championships. He was the selected to compete at the postponed-2020 Summer Olympics, where he placed fifth in the individual final.

== Personal life ==
Yudin is the son of Zhanna Yudina, a housewife, and Dmitry Yudin, a senior detective in the Department of Internal Affairs of Samara Oblast. His inspirations include trampoline gymnast Alexander Moskalenko, artistic gymnast Alexei Nemov, and wrestler Aleksandr Karelin.
