= Seif Asser Sherif =

Egyptian trampoline gymnast

- Born: 14 April 1995 (age 31) Giza, Egypt

Gymnastics career
- Discipline: Trampoline gymnastics
- Country represented: Egypt
- Club: Gezira Sporting Club
- Head coaches: Ahmed Abouelela, Sergei Marchenko
Medal record
Representing Egypt
Trampolining
African Championships
Gold medal – first place	2016 Walvis Bay	Synchro
Gold medal – first place	2018 Cairo	Team
Gold medal – first place	2018 Cairo	Synchro
Gold medal – first place	2021 Cairo	Individual
Silver medal – second place	2018 Cairo	Individual
Bronze medal – third place	2016 Walvis Bay	Individual

Seif Asser Sherif (born 14 April 1995) is an Egyptian trampoline gymnast. He competed in the 2020 Summer Olympics and placed tenth after winning the African Championships.

== Gymnastics career ==
Sherif began artistic gymnastics at the age of four and switched to trampoline in 2009 at the Gezira Sporting Club.

Sherif competed at his first World Championships in 2013 and finished 76th in the individual qualifications. Additionally, the Egyptian team finished 17th. At the 2015 Loule World Cup, he finished 69th in the individual qualifications and 24th in the synchro qualifications with Ahmed Abouelela Ibrahim. Then at the 2015 World Championships, he finished 79th in the individual qualifications and 39th in the synchro qualifications with Ahmed Rady Mostafa. He also placed 24th with Egypt in the team event.

At the 2016 African Championships, Sherif won a gold medal in the synchro competition and a silver medal in the individual event. He competed at the 2017 World Championships and placed 62nd in the individual qualifications, and he placed 22nd in the synchro qualifications with partner Mohab Hassan. He won the individual silver medal at the 2018 African Championships in Cairo, behind Algeria's Redha Messatfa. There, he also won gold medals in the team event and in the synchro event with Hassan.

Sherif finished 12th in the synchro qualifications at the 2019 Valladolid World Cup, where he also placed 75th in the individual qualifications. At the 2019 World Championships, he finished 73rd in the individual qualifications, and Egypt finished 18th in the team competition.

Sherif won the individual title at the 2021 African Championships and earned the continental berth for the Olympic Games. At the 2020 Summer Olympics, he finished tenth in the qualifications and was the second reserve for the final.
