= 2014 European Trampoline Championships =

2014 European Championships
- Venue: Pavilhão Multiusos de Guimarães
- Location: Guimarães, Portugal
- Dates: 7 to 13 April 2014

The 24th European Trampoline Championships were held at the Pavilhão Multiusos de Guimarães in Guimarães, Portugal, from April 7–13, 2014.

The championships also served as a qualification event for 2015 European Games.

== Medal summary ==
=== Medal table ===
Rank	Nation	Gold	Silver	Bronze	Total
1	Russia	7	5	2	14
2	Great Britain	4	3	3	10
3	Belarus	2	0	2	4
4	Portugal	1	2	1	4
5	Ukraine	0	1	4	5
6	Denmark	0	1	0	1
6	Poland	0	1	0	1
6	Spain	0	1	0	1
9	France	0	0	1	1
9	Sweden	0	0	1	1
9	Switzerland	0	0	1	1
Totals (11 entries)		14	14	15	43

=== Results ===
Event	Gold	Silver	Bronze
Men
Individual Trampoline	Uladzislau Hancharou (BLR)	Dmitry Ushakov (RUS)	Luke Strong (GBR)
Synchro	Russia; Sergei Azarian; Mikhail Melnik	Poland; Bartlomiej Hes; Lucas Tomaszewski	Switzerland; Simon Progin; Nicolas Schori
Trampoline Team	Russia	Portugal	Belarus
Double Mini	Mikhail Zalomin (RUS)	Daniel Pérez (ESP)	Jonas Nordfors (SWE)
Double Mini Team	Russia	Portugal	Great Britain
Tumbling	Kristof Willerton (GBR)	Greg Townley (GBR)	Viktor Kyforenko (UKR); Alexander Mironov (RUS)
Tumbling Team	Russia	Denmark	Ukraine
Women
Individual Trampoline	Hanna Harchonak (BLR)	Katherine Driscoll (GBR)	Marina Kiyko (UKR)
Synchro	Russia; Yana Pavlova; Victoria Voronina	Ukraine; Marina Kiyko; Nataliia Moskvina	France; Marine Jurbert; Joëlle Vallez
Trampoline Team	Great Britain	Russia	Belarus
Double Mini	Polina Troianova (RUS)	Georgia Downing (GBR)	Sílvia Saiote (POR)
Double Mini Team	Portugal	Russia	Great Britain
Tumbling	Lucie Colebeck (GBR)	Anastacia Isupova (RUS)	Ekaterina Gaas (RUS)
Tumbling Team	Great Britain	Russia	Ukraine
