= 2017 Trampoline Gymnastics World Championships =

2017 Trampoline World Championships
- Venue: Arena Sofia
- Location: Sofia, Bulgaria
- Start date: 9 November 2017
- End date: 12 November 2017

The 32nd Trampoline Gymnastics World Championships were held in Sofia, Bulgaria, from 9–12 November, 2017. It was held in conjunction with the 2017 Trampoline Gymnastics World Age Group Competitions, which were held the week after in the same arena.

290 athletes from 34 countries competed in 14 events. The event ambassadors were the first Olympic trampoline champions, Irina Karavayeva and Alexander Moskalenko. This was the first World Championships where horizontal displacement factored into the scoring.

Chinese gymnasts dominated the competition, winning 7 of the 14 available titles.

In the men's individual trampoline competition, reigning Olympic champion Uladzislau Hancharou struggled in qualifications, hitting the side of the trampoline, but he was able to advance to the final; there, however, he did not complete his intended routine after hitting the trampoline bed again. It was the first time since 2013 that he did not reach the podium at a major event. The title instead went to Gao Lei for the second consecutive year. Hancharou did win gold in the men's synchro event with partner Aleh Rabtsau. In the women's individual trampoline event, Tatsiana Piatrenia won her first individual trampoline title, and silver and bronze medalists Ayano Kishi and Sophiane Méthot won their first World medals. Jia Fangfang won her fourth World title in the women's individual tumbling event.

Bianca Zoonekynd won the women's double mini trampoline event, the first for a gymnast representing South Africa. Her victory was considered particularly impressive as she had been in a serious car accident three months prior to the event and was hospitalized with a punctured lung and broken ribs. In the men's team tumbling event, the Danish team won their country's first tumbling medal, bronze. The Chinese team for the men's trampoline team event featured three World champions (Dong Dong, the 2013 champion, Tu Xiao, the 2014 champion, and Gao Lei, the 2015 champion), who narrowly won the title above the Russian team; the Chinese women's trampoline team also won their event, and the Chinese women's tumbling team won a fourth consecutive victory.

== Medal table ==
Rank	Nation	Gold	Silver	Bronze	Total
1	China (CHN)	7	1	1	9
2	Russia (RUS)	3	4	2	9
3	Belarus (BLR)	2	1	1	4
4	Great Britain (GBR)	1	3	3	7
5	South Africa (RSA)	1	0	0	1
6	Japan (JPN)	0	2	1	3
7	United States (USA)	0	2	0	2
8	Denmark (DEN)	0	1	1	2
9	Australia (AUS)	0	0	1	1
9	Canada (CAN)	0	0	1	1
9	France (FRA)	0	0	1	1
9	Portugal (POR)	0	0	1	1
9	Sweden (SWE)	0	0	1	1
Totals (13 entries)		14	14	14	42

== Results ==
Event	Gold	Silver	Bronze
Men
Individual	Gao Lei (CHN)	Dmitry Ushakov (RUS)	Dong Dong (CHN)
Synchro	Belarus; Uladzislau Hancharou; Aleh Rabtsau	Great Britain; Luke Strong; Nathan Bailey	Russia; Dmitry Ushakov; Andrey Yudin
Trampoline Team	China; Dong Dong; Tu Xiao; Gao Lei	Russia; Sergei Azarian; Dmitry Ushakov; Andrey Yudin	Japan; Daiki Kishi; Masaki Ito; Ginga Munemoto
Double Mini	Mikhail Zalomin (RUS)	Austin Nacey (USA)	Aleksandr Odintsov (RUS)
Double Mini Team	Russia; Vasilii Makarskii; Aleksandr Odintsov; Mikhail Zalomin	United States; Carter Rhoades; Austin Nacey; Alexander Renkert	Australia; Jack Petrie; Dominic Clarke; Ryan Hatfield
Tumbling	Zhang Kuo (CHN)	Anders Wesch (DEN)	Elliott Browne (GBR)
Tumbling Team	Great Britain; Greg Townley; Elliott Browne; Kristof Willerton	China; Zhang Luo; Meng Wenchao; Zhang Kuo	Denmark; Adam Matthiesen; Rasmus Steffensen; Anders Wesch
Women
Individual	Tatsiana Piatrenia (BLR)	Ayano Kishi (JPN)	Sophiane Methot (CAN)
Synchro	China; Zhong Xingping; Zhu Xueying	Japan; Hikaru Mori; Yumi Takagi	Belarus; Tatsiana Piatrenia; Maryia Makharynskaya
Trampoline Team	China; Zhong Xingping; Zhu Xueying; Liu Lingling	Belarus; Hanna Harchonak; Tatsiana Piatrenia; Maryia Makharynskaya	Great Britain; Laura Gallagher; Isabelle Songhurst; Katherine Driscoll
Double Mini	Bianca Zoonekynd (RSA)	Polina Troianova (RUS)	Lina Sjöberg (SWE)
Double Mini Team	Russia; Dana Sadkova; Alina Khristenko; Polina Troianova	Great Britain; Kim Beattie; Phoebe Williams; Kirsty Way	Portugal; Beatriz Peng; Mafalda Brás; Inês Martins
Tumbling	Jia Fangfang (CHN)	Anna Korobeinikova (RUS)	Lucie Colebeck (GBR)
Tumbling Team	China; Chen Ling; Chen Lingxi; Jia Fangfang	Great Britain; Yasmin Taite; Rachel Davies; Lucie Colebeck	France; Lauriane Lamperim; Marie Deloge; Lea Callon
