= Maxim Shlyakin =

Russian trampoline gymnast

Gymnastics career
- Discipline: Trampoline gymnastics
- Country represented: Russia
Medal record
Men's trampoline gymnastics
Representing Russia
World Championships
Silver medal – second place	2019 Tokyo	Tumbling Team
European Championships
Gold medal – first place	2018 Baku	Tumbling Team
World Games
Bronze medal – third place	2017 Wrocław	Tumbling

Maxim Shlyakin is a Russian trampoline gymnast competing in tumbling and tumbling team events. In 2018, he won the gold medal in the tumbling team event at the European Trampoline Championships in Baku, Azerbaijan. He won the silver medal in this event at the 2019 Trampoline World Championships in Tokyo, Japan.

In 2017, he won the bronze medal in the men's tumbling event at the World Games held in Wrocław, Poland.
