= Laura Gallagher =

British trampoline gymnast and Olympian (born 1989)

- Full name: Laura Gallagher Cox
- Born: 26 March 1989 (age 37) Taunton, Somerset, England, UK
- Height: 5 ft 2 in (157 cm)
- Spouse: Matthew Cox

Gymnastics career
- Country represented: United Kingdom
- Training location: Quayside TGC
- Club: Quayside Trampoline & Gym Club
- Head coach: Susan Bramble
Medal record
World Championships
Gold medal – first place	2013 Sofia	Trampoline Team
Silver medal – second place	2011 Birmingham	Trampoline Team
Silver medal – second place	2019 Tokyo	Trampoline Team
Bronze medal – third place	2017 Sofia	Trampoline Team

Laura Gallagher Cox (born 26 March 1989) is a British retired trampoline gymnast. She is a four-time team World Championships medalist, and she represented Great Britain at the 2020 Summer Olympics.

== Gymnastics career ==
Gallagher competed with Kat Driscoll and Emma Smith at the 2011 World Championships, and they won a silver medal in the team event. The same team with the addition of Bryony Page won the team gold medal at the 2013 World Championships. In 2014, Gallagher suffered a back injury that led to her withdrawing from competition for seven months. She initially retired in 2016 but returned to competition after 18 months to win the 2017 British Championships.

At the 2017 World Championships, Gallagher, Driscoll, and Isabelle Songhurst won the team bronze medal. She finished fourth at the 2018 Vallodollid World Cup and then won her first FIG World Cup medal, a bronze, in Loulé. She finished sixth in the individual event at the 2019 World Championships and earned Great Britain a berth to the 2020 Summer Olympics. Additionally, she won a silver medal in the team competition.

In June 2021, Gallagher and Bryony Page were selected for the trampoline event at the 2020 Summer Olympics. There, she finished 15th in the qualification round after being unable to complete her second routine, and she did not advance into the final.

After the Olympic Games, Gallagher did not return to competition again until the 2023 World Championships. She did not advance into the individual final. In August 2024, she became Bridgwater and Taunton College’s trampolining coach. She subsequently announced her retirement from trampolining on in October 2024.

== Personal life ==
Gallagher volunteered as a National Health Service (NHS) responder to check in on senior citizens during the COVID-19 pandemic, and she led a Team GB fundraiser for the NHS. She has one daughter, Edie, who was born in January 2023.
