= Viktoriia Danilenko =

Russian trampoline gymnast

Gymnastics career
- Discipline: Trampoline gymnastics
- Country represented: Russia
Medal record
Women's trampoline gymnastics
Representing Russia
World Championships
Gold medal – first place	2019 Tokyo	Tumbling
Gold medal – first place	2019 Tokyo	All-around Team
Silver medal – second place	2019 Tokyo	Tumbling Team
Bronze medal – third place	2015 Odense	Tumbling Team
Bronze medal – third place	2018 Saint Petersburg	Tumbling
European Championships
Silver medal – second place	2018 Baku	Tumbling Team
Silver medal – second place	2021 Sochi	Tumbling Team
Silver medal – second place	2021 Sochi	Tumbling
Bronze medal – third place	2018 Baku	Tumbling

Viktoria Anatolyevna Danilenko (Russian: Виктория Анатольевна Даниленко; born 10 August 1994) is a Russian trampoline gymnast. She won the gold medal in the women's tumbling competition at the 2019 Trampoline Gymnastics World Championships held in Tokyo, Japan.

At the 2018 European Trampoline Championships held in Baku, Azerbaijan, she won the bronze medal in the women's tumbling event. In the tumbling team event she won the silver medal alongside Anna Korobeynikova, Elena Krasnokutskaya and Natalia Parakhina. In the same year, she also won the bronze medal in the women's tumbling event at the 2018 Trampoline Gymnastics World Championships held in Saint Petersburg, Russia.
