= Emma Smith (gymnast) =

British trampoline gymnast

- Born: September 24, 1991 (age 34)

Gymnastics career
- Discipline: Trampoline gymnastics
- Country represented: Great Britain
- Club: City of Liverpool
- Head coach: Jay Scouler (GBR)
- Former coach: Helen Shaw (GBR)
Medal record
Women's trampoline gymnastics
Representing Great Britain
World Championships
Gold medal – first place	2013 Sofia	Team
Silver medal – second place	2011 Birmingham	Team

Emma Smith (born 24 September 1991) is a British trampoline gymnast and champion best known for holding the world record for difficulty of routine performed in competition by a woman. The difficulty was 16.00DD and was achieved on 8 October 2011 in Odense, Denmark. She was also the first woman to have competed three triple somersaults in a routine.

== Early life and education ==
Smith attended Wade Deacon High School in Widnes, Cheshire, England.

== Career ==
Smith began her sports career in Artistic Gymnastics with the City of Liverpool Gymnastics Club and became British Espoir Champion in 2003. She left that discipline due to injuries, and made the switch to Trampoline Gymnastics in 2004. From that point, she has excelled at an exceptional rate and has made a name for herself within the sport worldwide. Beginning trampolining at Aerodynamics, Smith returned to the City of Liverpool Gymnastics Club (Trampoline Squad) and settled with coach Jay Scouler. In 2007 Smith took the Junior Girls Trampoline Gymnastics British title.

As a junior in the sport, Smith achieved a place on the British team and competed internationally for the first time in 2007 at the World Age Championships, held in Canada. There, she picked up a severe knee injury, which put her in a cast and on crutches for three months. Following four weeks of intense physiotherapy, and six months of being back on a trampoline, she became Junior European Champion in April 2008, in Odense, Denmark. Later that year Smith underwent surgery on her injured knee.

In 2009, Smith competed in her second World Age Championships, held in St Petersburg, Russia, taking the silver medal in the 17–18 girls category. It was her last event as a junior as she made her transition to a senior in 2010.

As a senior in the sport, Smith continued to represent her country. Her first international competition at this level came in the form of the Trampolining World Cup event held in Belgium during March 2010, at which she easily qualified for the final. Later that year she went on to take the Senior Trampoline Gymnastics British Ladies Title and her first international senior individual medal; a bronze at the Albacete World Cup in August 2010.

In October 2011, Emma Smith set a new world difficulty record on trampoline for women. She competed a routine of difficulty 16.00DD at the Trampoline and Tumbling World Cup, held in Odense, Denmark. This routine begins with three triple somersaults. Smith is currently the only female gymnast in this discipline to have achieved this in competition.

In 2011, Smith qualified to represent Great Britain in the World Championships, held in Birmingham during November 2011. This event was the first qualifying round for the 2012 Olympics. Smith, along with teammates Kat Driscoll, Bryony Page and Laura Gallagher, were awarded the silver medal in the team final, coming second to the Chinese.

In 2012, she competed in Portugal, taking first place at the Merseyside Championships.

In 2013, Smith, along with teammates Driscoll and Gallagher, won a world team gold medal, taking the World Championship title in Sofia. Smith also placed fourth individually in the Trampoline World Championship qualification.
