= Alexander Renkert =

American trampoline gymnast

- Born: March 26, 1993 (age 33)

Gymnastics career
- Discipline: Trampoline gymnastics
- Country represented: United States
Medal record
Men's trampoline gymnastics
Representing United States
World Championships
Gold medal – first place	2013 Sofia	Double Mini Team
Silver medal – second place	2013 Sofia	Double Mini
Silver medal – second place	2015 Odense	Double Mini Team
Silver medal – second place	2017 Sofia	Double Mini Team
Silver medal – second place	2019 Tokyo	Double Mini Team
Bronze medal – third place	2015 Odense	Tumbling Team
Bronze medal – third place	2019 Tokyo	Double Mini
Bronze medal – third place	2019 Tokyo	Tumbling Team
World Games
Silver medal – second place	2017 Wrocław	Double Mini

Alexander Renkert (born March 26, 1993) is an American trampoline gymnast.

He won the silver medal in the men's double mini event at the 2017 World Games held in Wrocław, Poland.

In 2019, he won the bronze medal in the men's double mini event at the Trampoline World Championships in Tokyo, Japan.
