= Elliott Browne (gymnast) =

British trampoline gymnast

- Nickname: Ell
- Born: Luton, England, United Kingdom

Gymnastics career
- Discipline: Trampoline gymnastics
- Country represented: Great Britain
- Club: Wakefield Gym Club
Medal record
Men's trampoline gymnastics
Representing Great Britain
World Championships
Gold medal – first place	2017 Sofia	Tumbling Team
Gold medal – first place	2019 Tokyo	Tumbling Team
Silver medal – second place	2018 Saint Petersburg	Tumbling
Silver medal – second place	2019 Tokyo	Tumbling
Silver medal – second place	2021 Baku	Tumbling Team
Bronze medal – third place	2017 Sofia	Tumbling
European Championships
Silver medal – second place	2018 Baku	Tumbling Team

Elliott Browne (born 1997) is a British trampoline gymnast. He was part of the gold medal-winning tumbling team at the 2019 World Championships in Tokyo, where he also won an individual silver medal.
