= Chisato Doihata =

Japanese trampoline gymnast

- Born: 9 August 1994 (age 32) Osaka Prefecture
- Height: 153 cm (5 ft 0 in)

Gymnastics career
- Discipline: Trampoline gymnastics
- Country represented: Japan (2011(?)-)

Chisato Doihata (土井畑 知里, Doihata Chisato; born 9 August 1994) is a Japanese individual and synchronised trampoline gymnast, representing her nation at international competitions.

She competed at world championships, including at the 2011, 2013 and 2015 Trampoline World Championships. She was employed by the Mitsubishi Electric on 1 April 2017.

== Results ==
- August 2010: the 1st Youth Olympic Games, Individual 3rd place
- September 2013: World Cup Spain Tournament, Synchro 1st place
- November 2015: 32nd World Trampoline Championships Tournament, Individual 24th, Synchro 3rd place
- June 2016: World Cup Swiss Tournament, Individual 6th
- November 2016: the All Japan Trampoline Championships, Individual 1st, Synchro 1st (4th consecutive year)
- April 2018: Canada Cup 2018, Synchro 1st, Individual 6th
