= Kristof Willerton =

British gymnast

Medal record

Men's tumbling

Representing Great Britain

World Championships
| Gold medal – first place | 2013 Sofia | Tumbling |
| Gold medal – first place | 2019 Tokyo | Tumbling Team |
| Gold medal – first place | 2017 Sofia | Tumbling Team |
| Gold medal – first place | 2022 Sofia | Tumbling Team |
| Silver medal – second place | 2021 Baku | Tumbling Team |
| Silver medal – second place | 2022 Sofia | Tumbling |
| Silver medal – second place | 2023 Birmingham | Tumbling Team |
| Bronze medal – third place | 2013 Sofia | Tumbling Team |
| Bronze medal – third place | 2025 Pamplona | All-Around Team |

European Championships
| Gold medal – first place | 2014 Guimarães | Tumbling |
| Gold medal – first place | 2016 Valladolid | Tumbling Team |
| Gold medal – first place | 2022 Rimini | Tumbling Team |
| Silver medal – second place | 2016 Valladolid | Tumbling |
| Silver medal – second place | 2018 Baku | Tumbling Team |
| Silver medal – second place | 2024 Guimarães | Tumbling Team |
| Bronze medal – third place | 2012 Saint Petersburg | Tumbling |
| Bronze medal – third place | 2024 Guimarães | Tumbling |

World Games
| Bronze medal – third place | 2013 Cali | Tumbling |

Kristof Willerton (born 21 July 1993) is a British gymnast. He won gold in tumbling at the 2013 Trampoline World Championships, thereby becoming the first British man to win a world tumbling title. He was part of the British tumbling team that won gold at the 2017 Trampoline Gymnastics World Championships, the 2019 Trampoline Gymnastics World Championships and at the 2022 Trampoline Gymnastics World Championships.

Willerton studied biochemistry at St Edmund Hall, Oxford.
