= Zhong Xingping =

Chinese trampoline gymnast

- Born: July 8, 1987 (age 39) Guangdong
- Height: 158 cm (5 ft 2 in)

Gymnastics career
- Discipline: Trampoline gymnastics
- Country represented: China
Medal record
Women's trampoline gymnastics
Representing China
World Championships
Gold medal – first place	2017 Sofia	Synchro
Gold medal – first place	2017 Sofia	Team
Gold medal – first place	2015 Odense	Synchro
Gold medal – first place	2015 Odense	Team
Silver medal – second place	2013 Sofia	Individual
Silver medal – second place	2013 Sofia	Synchro
Asian Games
Silver medal – second place	2014 Incheon	Individual
Silver medal – second place	2006 Doha	Individual

Zhong Xingping (born July 8, 1987) is a female Chinese trampoline gymnast. She won silver medal in the 2013 Trampoline World championship at Sofia, Bulgaria and 2014 Asian Games – Women's trampoline at Incheon, South Korea.
