= Luke Strong (gymnast) =

British trampoline gymnast

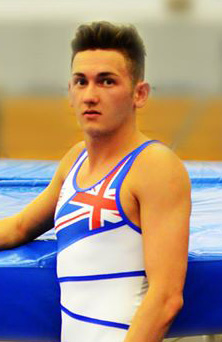

Personal information
- Full name: Luke Robert David Strong
- Born: 7 December 1993 (age 32) Liverpool

Gymnastics career
- Discipline: Trampoline gymnastics
- Country represented: Great Britain England
- Club: City of Liverpool TGC
- Head coach: Jay Scouler
- Retired: 16 June 2021
- World ranking: 12th
Medal record
Men's trampoline gymnastics
Representing Great Britain
World Championships
Silver medal – second place	2017 Sofia	Synchro
European Championships
Bronze medal – third place	2014 Guimarães	Individual

Luke Robert David Strong (born 7 December 1993) is a British trampoline gymnast. Strong won bronze at the 2014 European Championships.

Strong nearly lost his leg in 2009 when he sustained a severe injury during a training session. Strong has made a full recovery and in the trials for the 2012 London Olympics, he missed out by 0.1 of a point. However, in 2014, Strong became the first British male senior trampoline gymnast to win a medal at a European championships in the last 32 years, winning bronze in Portugal.

== Achievements ==
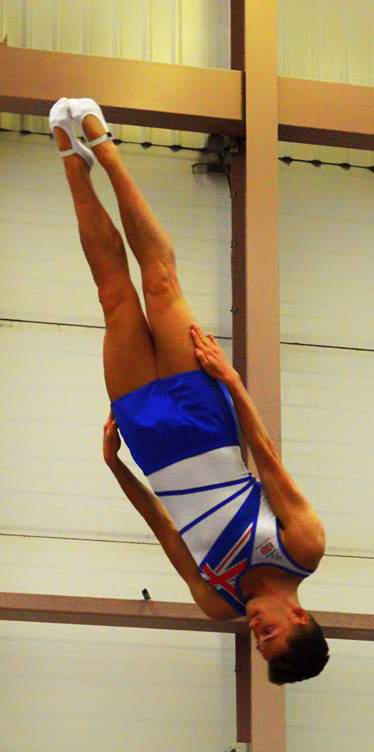
Luke Strong

- 2011 British Championship - GOLD
- 2011 World Cup CHN - 4th synchro (with Nathan Bailey)
- 2011 World Cup Kawasaki JPN, July - 5th
- 2011 World Cup CZE - 8th in synchro (with Nathan Bailey)
- 2011 World Ranking List – Ranked 18th individual and ranked 5th synchro (with Nathan Bailey)
- 2011 World Championships - Synchro finalist with Nathan Bailey
- 2013 British Championships - SILVER
- 2013 World Championship individual - 12th
- 2014 European Championships - BRONZE
- 2015 British Championship - GOLD
- 2016 British Championship - BRONZE
- 2016 New British Record for Difficulty - 17.8DD
- 2016 Rio Olympics Reserve

== Injuries ==
In 2009, Strong sustained a serious injury to one of his legs. In a statement to the Liverpool Echo, Strong’s coach, Jay Scouler, said, "Luke’s injury was the worst I’ve ever experienced with one of my athletes. The doctors said they may take his leg off. They were talking about amputation." But Strong made a full recovery and returned to compete in 2010 and won bronze in the British Trampoline Championships. In the beginning of 2015, Strong had another accident, again breaking his leg, but by June 2015 he was fully recovered.
