= 2019 Trampoline Gymnastics World Championships =

2019 Trampoline World Championships
- Venue: Ariake Gymnastics Centre
- Location: Tokyo, Japan
- Start date: 28 November 2019
- End date: 1 December 2019
- Competitors: 342 from 37 nations

The 2019 Trampoline Gymnastics World Championships was held in Tokyo, Japan from November 28 to December 1, 2019. The competition took place at the Ariake Gymnastics Centre, the same venue that would also host the gymnastics competitions at the Tokyo 2020 Summer Olympics, and served as a test event and a qualifier for the 2020 Summer Olympics.

37 federations had registered for the event.

== Participating nations ==
- Algeria (1)
- Argentina (11)
- Australia (23)
- Austria (3)
- Azerbaijan (3)
- Belarus (9)
- Belgium (5)
- Brazil (8)
- Bulgaria (2)
- Canada (20)
- China (22)
- Czech Republic (2)
- Denmark (9)
- Egypt (8)
- France (14)
- Georgia (2)
- Germany (7)
- Great Britain (22)
- Greece (4)
- Iran (1)
- Italy (4)
- Japan (19)
- Kazakhstan (4)
- Mexico (10)
- Netherlands (7)
- New Zealand (11)
- Poland (4)
- Portugal (17)
- Russia (26)
- Spain (11)
- Sweden (4)
- Switzerland (2)
- Turkey (3)
- Ukraine (14)
- United States (25)
- Uzbekistan (3)
- Venezuela (1)

== Medal summary ==
Event	Gold	Silver	Bronze
Men
Individual	Gao Lei (CHN)	Ivan Litvinovich (BLR)	Dong Dong (CHN)
Individual Team	Belarus; Uladzislau Hancharou; Ivan Litvinovich; Aleh Rabtsau; Aliaksei Dudarau	China; Tu Xiao; Dong Dong; Gao Lei; Yan Langyu	Russia; Mikhail Melnik; Andrey Yudin; Dmitry Ushakov; Nikita Fedorenko
Synchro	Japan; Kazufumi Tasaki; Ginga Munetomo	Belarus; Aleh Rabtsau; Uladzislau Hancharou	Russia; Mikhail Melnik; Sergey Azarian
Double Mini	Mikhail Zalomin (RUS)	Ruben Padilla (USA)	Alexander Renkert (USA)
Double Mini Team	Russia; Andrei Gladenkov; Vasilii Makarskii; Mikhail Zalomin; Aleksandr Odintsov	United States; Alexander Renkert; Simon Smith; Ruben Padilla; Noah Orr	Portugal; Tiago Sampaio Romao; João Caeiro; Diogo Carvalho Costa; Diogo Cabral
Tumbling	Aleksandr Lisitsyn (RUS)	Elliott Browne (GBR)	Kaden Brown (USA)
Tumbling Team	Great Britain; Kristof Willerton; Elliott Browne; Jaydon Paddock; Dominic Mensah	Russia; Aleksandr Lisitsyn; Maxim Shlyakin; Vadim Afanasev; Maksim Riabikov	United States; Alexander Renkert; Haydn Fitzgerald; Kaden Brown; Brandon Krzynefski
Women
Individual	Hikaru Mori (JPN)	Chisato Doihata (JPN)	Rosie MacLennan (CAN)
Individual Team	Japan; Chisato Doihata; Reina Satake; Hikaru Mori; Megu Uyama	Great Britain; Laura Gallagher; Isabelle Songhurst; Bryony Page; Katherine Driscoll	Canada; Sophiane Methot; Samantha Smith; Sarah Milette; Rosie MacLennan
Synchro	Japan; Ayano Kishi; Yumi Takagi	Russia; Susana Kochesok; Anna Kornetskaya	Canada; Samantha Smith; Rachel Tam
Double Mini	Lina Sjöberg (SWE)	Bronwyn Dibb (NZL)	Aleksandra Bonartseva (RUS)
Double Mini Team	United States; Kayttie Nakamura; Kiley Lockett; Tristan van Natta; Sydney Senter	Great Britain; Kim Beattie; Ruth Shevelan; Kirsty Way; Bethany Williamson	Russia; Galina Begim; Aleksandra Bonartseva; Polina Troianova; Alina Khristenko
Tumbling	Viktoriia Danilenko (RUS)	Shanice Davidson (GBR)	Megan Kealy (GBR)
Tumbling Team	Great Britain; Shanice Davidson; Aimee Antonius; Megan Kealy; Kaitlin Lafferty	Russia; Elina Stepanova; Elena Krasnokutskaya; Viktoriia Danilenko; Irina Silicheva	France; Emilie Wambote; Léa Callon; Marie Deloge; Isma Laanaya
Mixed
All-around Team	Russia; Vadim Afanasev; Sergey Azarian; Vera Beliankina; Viktoriia Danilenko; Susana Kochesok; Anna Kornetskaya; Mikhail Melnik; Polina Troianova; Dmitry Ushakov; Mikhail Zalomin	United States; Nicole Ahsinger; Kaden Brown; Eve Doudican; Jeffrey Gluckstein; Ellen Heinen; Kayttie Nakamura; Ruben Padilla; Aliaksei Shostak; Tristan van Natta	China; Fan Xinyi; Fang Lulu; Feng Baoyi; Gao Lei; Huang Yanfei; Liu Hui; Wang Xiaoyin; Yan Langyu; Zhang Xuan; Zhang Zhenqian

== Medal table ==
Rank	Nation	Gold	Silver	Bronze	Total
1	Russia	5	3	4	12
2	Japan	4	1	0	5
3	Great Britain	2	4	1	7
4	United States	1	3	3	7
5	Belarus	1	2	0	3
6	China	1	1	2	4
7	Sweden	1	0	0	1
8	New Zealand	0	1	0	1
9	Canada	0	0	3	3
10	France	0	0	1	1
10	Portugal	0	0	1	1
Totals (11 entries)		15	15	15	45
