= Lina Sjöberg =

Swedish trampoline gymnast

- Born: 6 September 1993 (age 33) Uppsala, Sweden

Gymnastics career
- Discipline: Trampoline gymnastics
Medal record
Women's trampoline gymnastics
Representing Sweden
World Championships
Gold medal – first place	2018 Saint Petersburg	Double Mini
Gold medal – first place	2019 Tokyo	Double Mini
Gold medal – first place	2021 Baku	Double Mini
Bronze medal – third place	2015 Odense	Double Mini
Bronze medal – third place	2017 Sofia	Double Mini
European Championships
Gold medal – first place	2016 Valladolid	Double Mini
Silver medal – second place	2021 Sochi	Double Mini
Bronze medal – third place	2018 Baku	Double Mini
World Games
Bronze medal – third place	2017 Wrocław	Double Mini
Bronze medal – third place	2022 Birmingham	Double Mini

Lina Sjöberg (born 6 September 1993) is a Swedish trampoline gymnast. She is a three-time gold medalist in the women's double mini trampoline event at the Trampoline Gymnastics World Championships. She also won the gold medal in this event at the 2016 European Trampoline Championships held in Valladolid, Spain.

== Career ==
In 2017, she won the bronze medal in the women's double mini event at the World Games held in Wrocław, Poland.

At the 2018 European Trampoline Championships held in Baku, Azerbaijan, she won the bronze medal in the women's double mini event.

In 2019, she represented Sweden at the European Games in the women's trampoline event. She did not qualify to compete in the final.

She won the bronze medal in the women's double mini event at the 2022 World Games held in Birmingham, United States.
