= Georgia Downing =

British athlete (born 1996)

Personal information
- Born: December 19, 1996 (age 29) United Kingdom

Sport
- Sport: Trampolining

Georgia Downing (born 19 December 1996) is a British athlete who competes in trampoline gymnastics.

== Awards ==
European Championship
Year	Place	Medal	Type
2014	Guimarães (Portugal)	Silver	Double Mini
