= Mikhail Zalomin =

Russian trampoline gymnast

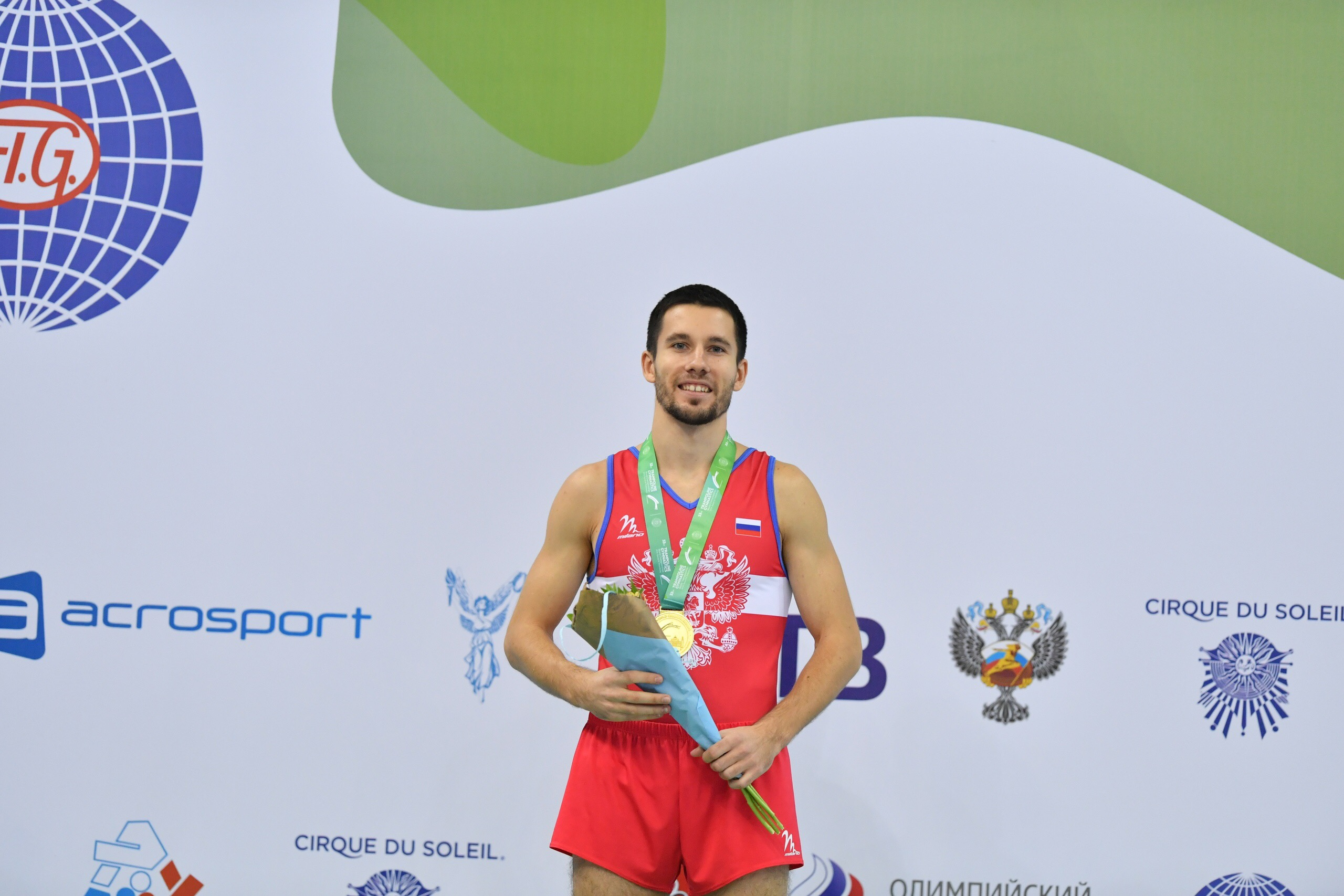

Personal information
- Full name: Mikhail Ivanovich Zalomin
- Born: November 22, 1992 (age 33) Sarov, Nizhny Novgorod Oblast, Russia

Gymnastics career
- Discipline: Trampoline gymnastics
- Country represented: Russia
Medal record
Men's trampoline gymnastics
Representing RGF
World Championships
| Gold medal – first place | 2021 Baku | Double Mini Team |
| Gold medal – first place | 2021 Baku | All-Around Team |
| Silver medal – second place | 2025 Pamplona | Double Mini |
| Silver medal – second place | 2025 Pamplona | All-Around Team |
| Bronze medal – third place | 2025 Pamplona | Double Mini Team |
Representing Russia
World Championships
| Gold medal – first place | 2013 Sofia | Double Mini |
| Gold medal – first place | 2014 Daytona Beach | Double Mini |
| Gold medal – first place | 2015 Odense | Double Mini Team |
| Gold medal – first place | 2017 Sofia | Double Mini |
| Gold medal – first place | 2017 Sofia | Double Mini Team |
| Gold medal – first place | 2018 Saint Petersburg | Double Mini |
| Gold medal – first place | 2019 Tokyo | Double Mini |
| Gold medal – first place | 2019 Tokyo | Double Mini Team |
| Gold medal – first place | 2019 Tokyo | All-Around Team |
| Silver medal – second place | 2015 Odense | Double Mini |
European Championships
| Gold medal – first place | 2014 Guimarães | Double Mini |
| Gold medal – first place | 2014 Guimarães | Double Mini Team |
| Gold medal – first place | 2016 Valladolid | Double Mini |
| Gold medal – first place | 2016 Valladolid | Double Mini Team |
| Gold medal – first place | 2018 Baku | Double Mini Team |
| Gold medal – first place | 2021 Sochi | Double Mini Team |

Mikhail Ivanovich Zalomin (Russian: Михаил Иванович Заломин; born 22 December 1992 in Sarov, Nizhny Novgorod Oblast) is a Russian male trampoline gymnast. He is a 11-time World Champion, 6-time European Champion and a 6-time Russian national champion.

== Career ==
Zalomin began competing in trampoline in 2003 at a junior level. He won his first world medal, the bronze, in the 11/12-year-old boys age group, in double mini trampoline at the 16th Trampoline World Age Group Games in Hannover, Germany in October 2003. His first coach in Sarov was Alexander Zamotayev.

In 2009 Zalomin moved to Moscow, to study at the Moscow Secondary Special School of Olympic Reserve No. 1, where he was coached by V.I. Lukyanov.

Zalomin won his first senior world gold medal, in double mini trampoline, at the 2013 Trampoline World Championships in Sofia. He won his most recent world gold mendal, also in double mini trampoline, at the 2019 Trampoline Gymnastics World Championships in Tokyo.

Zalomin is the current President of the Moscow Sports Trampoline Federation.

He holds the title of a Meritorious Master of Sports of Russia.

Zalomin holds bachelor's and master's degrees from the Moscow City Pedagogical University.
