= Dominic Clarke =

Australian trampoline gymnast

- Born: 4 January 1997 (age 29) Plymouth, Devon, England
- Height: 173 cm (5 ft 8 in)

Gymnastics career
- Discipline: Trampoline gymnastics
- Country represented: Australia; (2014–present (senior))
- Club: Redlands Gymnastics; Castle Hill RSL; Sydney Gymnastics Centre
- Head coaches: Brett Austine; Belinda Cox
Medal record
Men's trampoline gymnastics
Representing Australia
World Championships
Bronze medal – third place	2017 Sofia	Double mini
Bronze medal – third place	2018 Saint Petersburg	Synchronised

Dominic Clarke (born 4 January 1997) is an Australian trampoline gymnast who represented his country at the 2020 Summer Olympics.

Clarke first competed at the Trampoline Gymnastics World Championships in 2015, placing fourth in both the synchronised and double mini trampoline events. At the 2017 championships, he won the bronze medal in the double mini event. At the 2018 championships, he won the bronze medal in the synchronised event.

In July 2021, Clarke secured selection for the delayed 2020 Summer Olympics, held in Tokyo. He qualified for the final coming fourth in the qualification. He did not win a medal.

Clarke started training in gymnastics at the age of five in the Redlands, located in the Brisbane metropolitan area.

In 2022, Clarke auditioned for The Voice Australia where he ultimately chose to be on Team Rita. He was eliminated the next round.

== Personal life ==
Clarke was born in Plymouth, Devon, England, before moving to Australia as a child. He is gay and queer, and is the pride ambassador for Gymnastics New South Wales. He has taught at a public school in New South Wales.
