= Jia Fangfang =

Chinese gymnast (born 1994)

Jia Fangfang (born 1994) is a Chinese gymnast who competes in tumbling. She has won five world championships in tumbling, a world record. She was noted for both the difficulty and execution of her tumbling passes. Jia also competed in the floor exercise of artistic gymnastics in the 2018 and 2019 Chinese national competitions. Jia withdrew from the 2019 Trampoline Gymnastics World Championships.
