= Maryna Kyiko =

Ukrainian trampoline gymnast

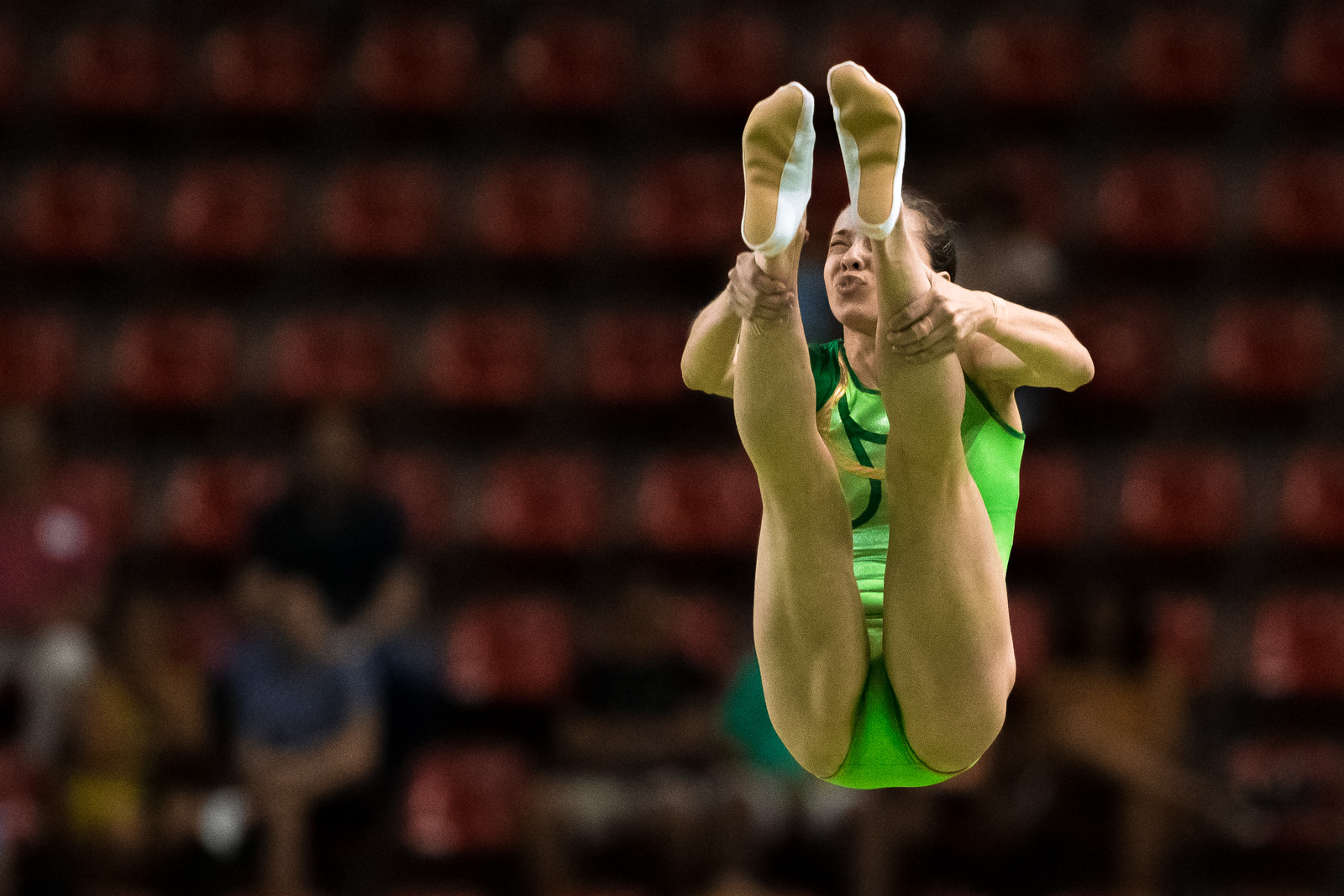
- Maryna Kyiko Olympics Test Event

Personal information
- Born: January 7, 1987 (age 39) Kiev, Ukrainian SSR, Soviet Union
- Height: 162 cm (5 ft 4 in)

Gymnastics career
- Discipline: Trampoline gymnastics
- Country represented: Ukraine
Medal record
Women's trampoline gymnastics
Representing Ukraine
World Championships
Bronze medal – third place	2015 Odense	Synchro
World Games
Bronze medal – third place	2013 Cali	Synchro
European Games
Silver medal – second place	2019 Minsk	Synchro
European Championships
Gold medal – first place	2006 Metz	Team
Gold medal – first place	2008 Odense	Team
Silver medal – second place	2012 St. Petersburg	Team
Silver medal – second place	2014 Guimarães	Synchro
Bronze medal – third place	2014 Guimarães	Individual
Bronze medal – third place	2016 Valladolid	Synchro
Bronze medal – third place	2018 Baku	Synchro

Maryna Kyiko (born 7 January 1987) is a trampoline gymnast from Ukraine.

Maryna competed in the women's trampoline event at the 2012 Summer Olympics where she finished last in 16th place.

At the 2019 European Games in Minsk, she won a silver medal in the synchronized trampoline event alongside Svitlana Malkova.

In February 2020, at the FIG Trampoline World Cup in Baku, she and Svitlana Malkova again secured a silver medal in the synchronized competition.

== State awards ==
- Order of Princess Olga, 3rd Class (15 July 2019) – for achieving high sporting results at the 2019 European Games in Minsk, demonstrating dedication and will to win, and raising the international prestige of Ukraine.
