= Sviatlana Makshtarova =

Belarusian-Azerbaijani trampoline gymnast

Sviatlana Makshtarava
- Alternative name: Svetlana Makshtarova (Russian)
- Born: 26 July 1994 (age 32) Belarus

Gymnastics career
- Discipline: Trampoline gymnastics
- Country represented: Belarus (until May 2014) Azerbaijan (from May 2014); (Belarus: 2011(?)-2014 Azerbaijan: 2015(?)-)
- Head coach: Uladzimir Shulkin (BLR)
Medal record
Women's trampoline gymnastics
Representing Belarus
World Championships
Bronze medal – third place	2013 Sofia	Team
Representing Azerbaijan
World Games
Silver medal – second place	2017 Wrocław	Synchro

Sviatlana Makshtarava (Belarusian: Святлана Макштарава or Svetlana Makshtarova; born 26 July 1994) is a Belarusian-Azerbaijani individual and synchronised trampoline gymnast, representing her nation at international competitions.

== Career ==
She was born in Belarus. she currently lives in Baku, Azerbaijan.

According to EC decision, she changed of nationality from Belarusian to Azerbaijani in May 2014. She is entitled to represent Azerbaijan one year after she has obtained Azerbaijani passport. That is to say in May 2015.

She competed at world championships, including at the 2011, 2013 and 2015 Trampoline World Championships. She participated at the 2015 European Games in Baku.

She Silver medal YOG 2010 [Singapore], Gold medal and bronze medal European Championship [2012 St. Petersburg ], Russia. She bronze medal The world Championship [2014 Varna], Bulgaria. Makshtarova won the silver medal in Women's Synchro at The World Games 2017 in Wrocław, Poland.
