= Beatriz Martins =

Portuguese trampoline gymnast

- Full name: Beatriz Cordeiro Martins
- Born: May 15, 1994 (age 32)

Gymnastics career
- Discipline: Trampoline gymnastics
- Country represented: Portugal
- Club: Lisboa Ginásio Clube
- Head coaches: Luís Nunes, Carlos Nobre
Medal record
Women's trampoline gymnastics
Representing Portugal
European Games
Bronze medal – third place	2015 Baku	Synchro
European Championships
Bronze medal – third place	2016 Valladolid	Synchro
Bronze medal – third place	2018 Baku	Team
World Championships
Bronze medal – third place	2021 Baku	Synchro

Beatriz Cordeiro Martins (born 15 May 1994) is a Portuguese trampoline gymnast. She competed at the 2015 European Games, where she won the women's synchronized bronze medal together with Ana Rente.
