= Tatsiana Piatrenia =

Belarusian trampoline gymnast

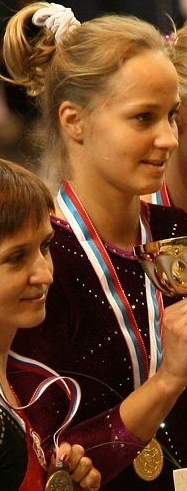
- Piatrenia in 2008

Personal information
- Native name: Татьяна Олеговна Петреня
- Born: 18 October 1981 (age 44) Mogilev, Byelorussian SSR, Soviet Union
- Years active: 2004–
- Height: 167 cm (5 ft 6 in)
- Weight: 53 kg (117 lb)

Sport
- Country: Belarus
- Sport: Trampolining

Achievements and titles
- Olympic finals: 2004, 2008, 2012, 2016
- World finals: 2015, 2016, 2017
- Regional finals: 2012
Medal record
Trampolining
Representing Belarus
European Trampoline Championships
Gold medal – first place	2012 Saint Petersburg	Individual
Silver medal – second place	2021 Sochi	Team
Trampoline World Championships
Bronze medal – third place	2015 Odense	Synchronised
Gold medal – first place	2017 Sofia	Individual
Bronze medal – third place	2017 Sofia	Synchronised
FIG World Cup
Silver medal – second place	2016 Baku	Individual

Tatsiana Piatrenia (also Tatyana Petrenya, Russian: Татьяна Олеговна Петреня, born 18 October 1981) is a Belarusian trampoline gymnast, who has competed at four Olympic Games, with a best finish of fifth. She won the individual events at the 2017 Trampoline Gymnastics World Championships and the 2012 European Trampoline Championships.

== Career ==
Piatrenia competed at the 2004, 2008, 2012 and 2016 Summer Olympics, making her the first female trampoline gymnast to compete at four Olympics. At the 2004 and 2008 Games, she did not reach the final of the women's individual event. In 2012, she won her event at the European Trampoline Championships, and finished fifth in the women's individual event in the Olympics. In 2015, Piatrenia won a bronze medal in the women's synchronized trampoline event at the Trampoline World Championships. In 2016, she reached the FIG World Cup final, finishing second in the women's individual event. She finished fifth in women's individual final at the 2016 Games, after having come first in the qualifying section of the event. In 2017, she won the women's individual event at the 2017 Trampoline Gymnastics World Championships, and came third in the women's synchronised trampoline event alongside Maryia Makharynskaya. She was part of the Belarus team that came second in the women's team event at the 2021 European Trampoline Championships.

== Awards ==
In 2014, she was awarded the Master of Sport of Belarus by Belarusian President Alexander Lukashenko. In 2017, she won the Belarus Female Sportsperson of the Year award.
