= Leonie Adam =

German trampoline gymnast

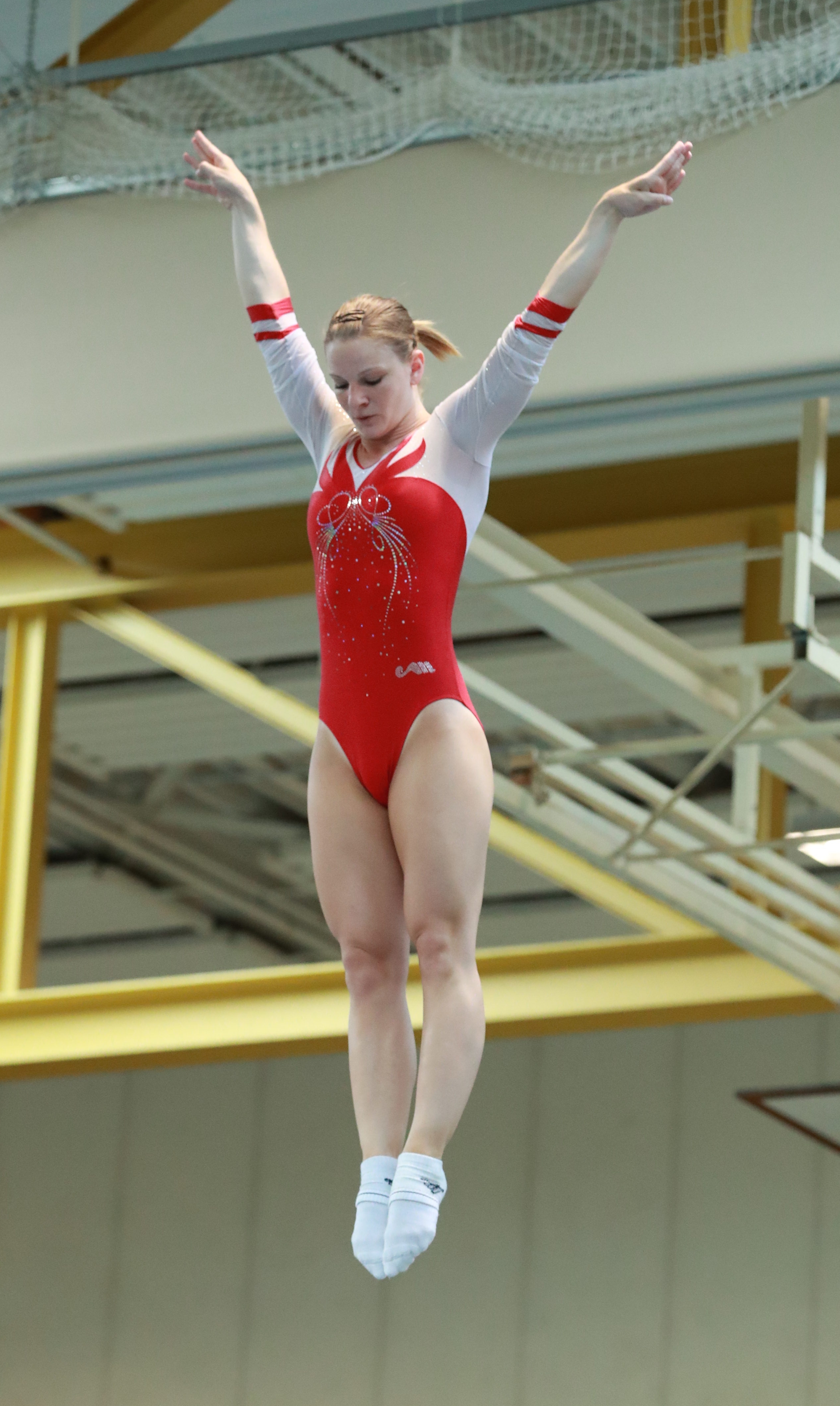
- Leonie Adam during the finals competition at the 9th International Filder Pokal in Ruit

Personal information
- Born: 2 January 1993 (age 33) Filderstadt, Germany
- Height: 162 cm (5 ft 4 in)

Gymnastics career
- Discipline: Trampoline gymnastics
- Country represented: Germany (2012-)
- Club: MTV Stuttgart
- Head coach: Michael Kuhn

Leonie Adam (born 2 January 1993 in Filderstadt) is a German individual trampoline gymnast, representing her nation at international competitions.

She made her international senior debut for the German national team in 2012 at the World Cup in Loule, Portugal. She competed at world championships, including at the 2013, 2014 and 2015 Trampoline World Championships. She participated at the 2015 European Games in Baku finishing 10th in the individual event. She suffered from stomach pain in February 2016. She competed at the 2016 Summer Olympics in Rio de Janeiro where she finished 10th in the qualifications and did not advance to the final.

== Personal ==
Born in Filderstadt, she currently lives in Stuttgart. She studied economics at the Nürtingen-Geislingen University of Applied Science in Germany.
