= Hanna Hancharova =

Belarusian trampoline gymnast

- Alternative name: Hanna Harchonak
- Born: 11 February 1992 (age 34)

Gymnastics career
- Discipline: Trampoline gymnastics
- Country represented: Belarus (2009(?)-)
- Head coach: Olga Vlasova
Medal record
Women's trampoline gymnastics
Representing Belarus
World Championships
| Silver medal – second place | 2017 Sofia | Team |
| Silver medal – second place | 2015 Odense | Synchro |
| Silver medal – second place | 2015 Odense | Team |
| Silver medal – second place | 2014 Daytona Beach | Synchro |
| Bronze medal – third place | 2014 Daytona Beach | Individual |
| Bronze medal – third place | 2013 Sofia | Team |
European Games
| Gold medal – first place | 2019 Minsk | Synchro |
| Bronze medal – third place | 2015 Baku | Individual |
| Bronze medal – third place | 2019 Minsk | Individual |

Hanna Hancharova (née Harchonak; Belarusian: Ганна Гарчонак; born 11 February 1992) is a Belarusian individual and synchronised trampoline gymnast, representing her nation at international competitions.

At the 2015 European Games in Baku she won the gold medal in the individual event. She competed at world championships, including at the 2009, 2011, 2013, 2014 and 2015 Trampoline World Championships.

She has also competed in rhythmic gymnastics. And she is currently married to fellow Belarusian and male trampoline gymnast Uladzislau Hancharou.
