= Ana Rente =

Portuguese trampoline gymnast

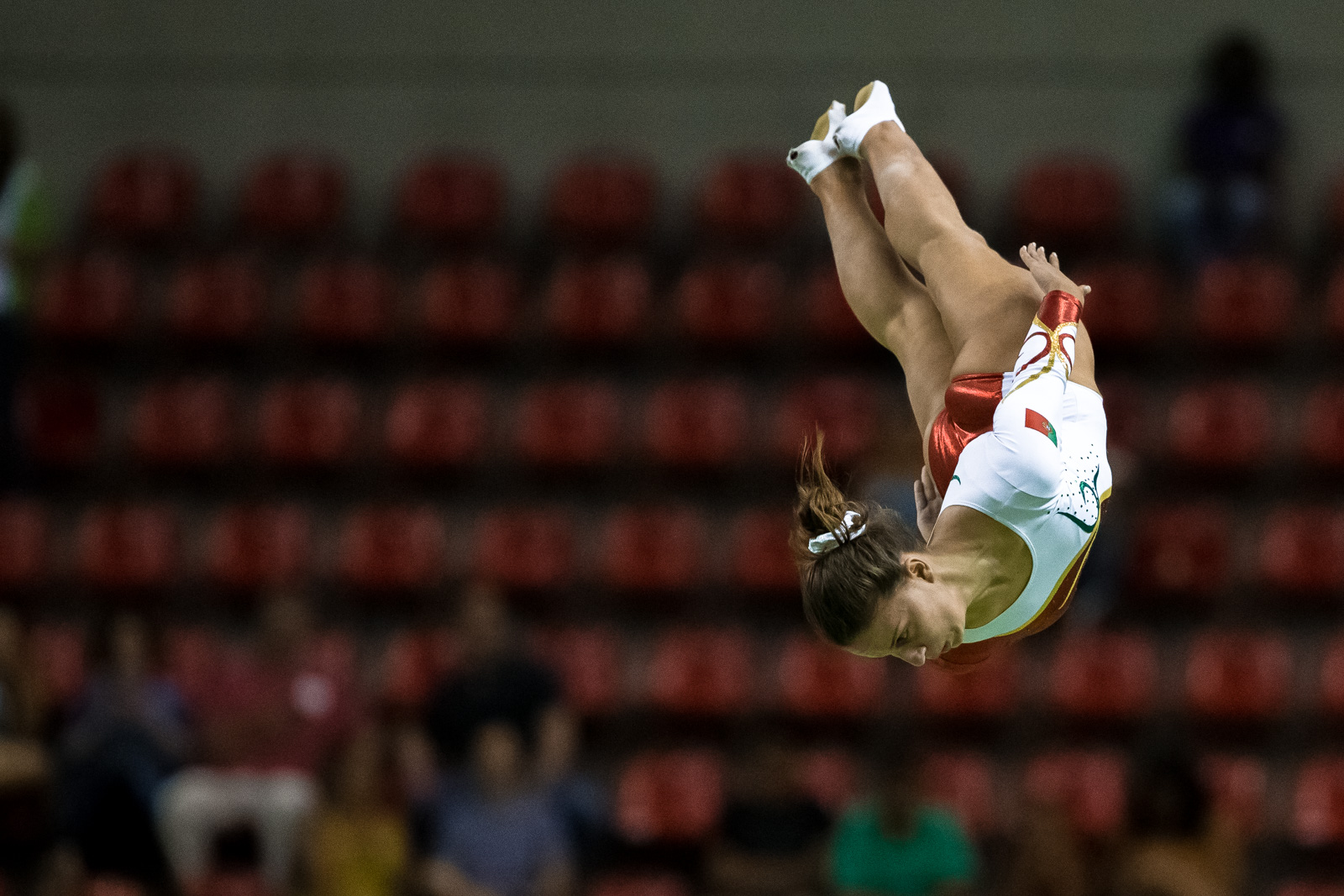
- Rente competing at the 2016 Gymnastics Olympic Test Event

Personal information
- Full name: Ana Patrícia Robert de Oliveira Rente
- Born: 27 April 1988 (age 38) Coimbra
- Height: 158 cm (5 ft 2 in)

Gymnastics career
- Discipline: Trampoline gymnastics
- Country represented: Portugal
- Club: Lisboa Ginásio Clube
- Head coaches: Luís Nunes, Carlos Nobre
Medal record
Women's trampoline gymnastics
Representing Portugal
European Games
Bronze medal – third place	2015 Baku	Synchro
European Championships
Bronze medal – third place	2016 Valladolid	Synchro
Bronze medal – third place	2018 Baku	Team

Ana Patrícia Robert de Oliveira Rente (born 27 April 1988) is a Portuguese Olympic trampoline gymnast from Coimbra. She competed at the 2008, 2012 and 2016 Summer Olympics, and won the women's synchronized bronze medal at the 2015 European Games, together with Beatriz Martins.
