= Yana Pavlova =

Russian trampoline gymnast

- Full name: Yana Vladimirovna Pavlova
- Born: 6 January 1996 (age 30)
- Height: 156 cm (5 ft 1 in)

Gymnastics career
- Discipline: Trampoline gymnastics
- Country represented: Russia; (2013)
- Club: Central Army Sports Club [CSKA]
- Head coach: Vitaly Dubko (from 2006)
Medal record
Women's trampoline gymnastics
Representing Russia
World Championships
| Bronze medal – third place | 2015 Odense | Team |
| Bronze medal – third place | 2018 Saint Petersburg | Individual |
European Championships
| Gold medal – first place | 2014 Guimarães | Synchro |
| Gold medal – first place | 2016 Valladolid | Individual |
| Silver medal – second place | 2016 Valladolid | Team |
| Gold medal – first place | 2018 Baku | Individual |
European Games
| Gold medal – first place | 2015 Baku | Individual |
| Gold medal – first place | 2015 Baku | Synchro |
| Bronze medal – third place | 2019 Minsk | Synchro |
Pacific Rim Championships
| Silver medal – second place | 2012 Everett | Team |

Yana Vladimirovna Pavlova (Russian: Яна Владимировна Павлова; born 6 January 1996) is a Russian individual and synchronised trampoline gymnast, representing her nation at international competitions.

== Career ==
She began training in 2006 in Krasnodar, Russia. She made her international debut for Russia in 2013 at a World Cup. She competed at world championships, including at the 2013, 2014 and 2015 Trampoline World Championships. In 2015 she won the bronze medal in the team trampoline event. At the 2015 European Games in Baku she won the gold medal in both the individual event and the synchronised event with Anna Kornetskaya. She competed at the 2016 Summer Olympics.

== Personal ==
She did a study coaching at the Kuban State University of Physical Education, Sport and Tourism in Krasnodar, Russia. She holds the title of Master of Sport of International Class in Russia.
