= Kat Driscoll =

British trampoline gymnast (born 1986)

Personal information
- Full name: Katherine Joan Driscoll
- Nickname: Kitty
- Nationality: British
- Born: 13 March 1986 (age 40) Chatham, Kent
- Height: 5 ft 6 in (168 cm)
- Weight: 121 lb (55 kg)

Sport
- Country: Great Britain
- Sport: Trampolining
- Coached by: Gary Short

Achievements and titles
- Highest world ranking: 1
Medal record
Women's trampoline gymnastics
Representing Great Britain
World Championships
Gold medal – first place	2013 Sofia	Synchro
Gold medal – first place	2013 Sofia	Team
Silver medal – second place	2011 Birmingham	Team
Silver medal – second place	2019 Tokyo	Team
Bronze medal – third place	2011 Birmingham	Synchro
Bronze medal – third place	2017 Sofia	Team
European Games
Silver medal – second place	2015 Baku	Individual
European Championships
Gold medal – first place	2012 St. Petersburg	Team
Gold medal – first place	2014 Guimarães	Team
Gold medal – first place	2016 Valladolid	Team
Silver medal – second place	2014 Guimarães	Individual
Silver medal – second place	2012 St. Petersburg	Synchro
Bronze medal – third place	2016 Valladolid	Individual
Bronze medal – third place	2018 Baku	Individual
World Games
Gold medal – first place	2013 Cali	Synchro

Katherine Joan Driscoll (born 13 March 1986) is a British trampoline gymnast, and has been ranked as world number one. She became a full-time athlete in 2010, and has since won team and synchronised medals at the World and European Championships. She was chosen for the British team for the 2012 Summer Olympics after earning Great Britain a spot in the Women's Trampolining following her performance at the 2011 Trampoline World Championships.

== Career ==
Driscoll was born in Chatham, Kent, on 13 March 1986. She took up the sport of trampolining at the age of seven after taking lessons during her school holidays. Driscoll attended Rochester Grammar School for Girls. Whilst a member of Jumpers Trampoline Club in Gillingham (Kent) she first took part on the international circuit when she competed in the World Age Games in 1998. Between September 2003 and July 2004, Kat also studied at MidKent College on a BTEC First Diploma in Sport course. She had also been interested in swimming, but chose to compete in trampolining. Until 2010, Driscoll worked full-time at bank HSBC whilst training. Funding became available from UK Sport enabling her to become a full-time trampolinist. She has described the ability to take up the sport full-time as a crucial turning point in her career.

She won gold at the Aalsmeer Flower Cup in 2009. She has won the British championship twice, and finished in the top three spots on two occasions during the 2011 World Cup competitions. Driscoll went into the 2011 Trampoline World Championships held in Birmingham, England, as world number one in Trampolining due to her high attendance and good results at World Cup competitions giving her more points than other competitors who did not attend as many. She was described by BBC Sport prior to the Championships as "Great Britain's secret world number one". She finished in ninth place, but, as National Olympic Committees are only allowed to send a maximum of two athletes to the Games, and China had four competitors in the top eight, she obtained the seventh place Olympic berth for a sole trampolinist at the 2012 Games. She would still need to qualify for the place in a series of competitions. She repeated that feat at the World Championships in Denmark 2015 by finishing 7th in the Individual Final, thus again securing a GB place this time in the Rio 2016 Olympic Games – the only GB trampolinist to secure two consecutive berths at the Olympic Games – and again, she will still need to qualify for the place in a series of competitions.

At the 2012 Gymnastics Olympic Test Event at the O2 Arena in January 2012, where the trampolining events for the 2012 Summer Olympics would be in July, Driscoll finished in fourth place. Despite finishing in eighth place in the individual events at the 2012 European Championships, she won the silver medal in the synchronised competition alongside Amanda Parker, and was part of the British team that won the gold medal. Just over one month prior to the naming of the British team, she won the North West Gala on 3 June, which was also an Olympic trial.

At the 2012 Olympics Individual Trampoline competition, she finished in 9th place after the preliminary routines and failed to qualify for the finals.

== Personal life ==
Driscoll is married to former British trampolinist, Gary Short.
