= Nataliia Moskvina =

Ukrainian trampoline gymnast

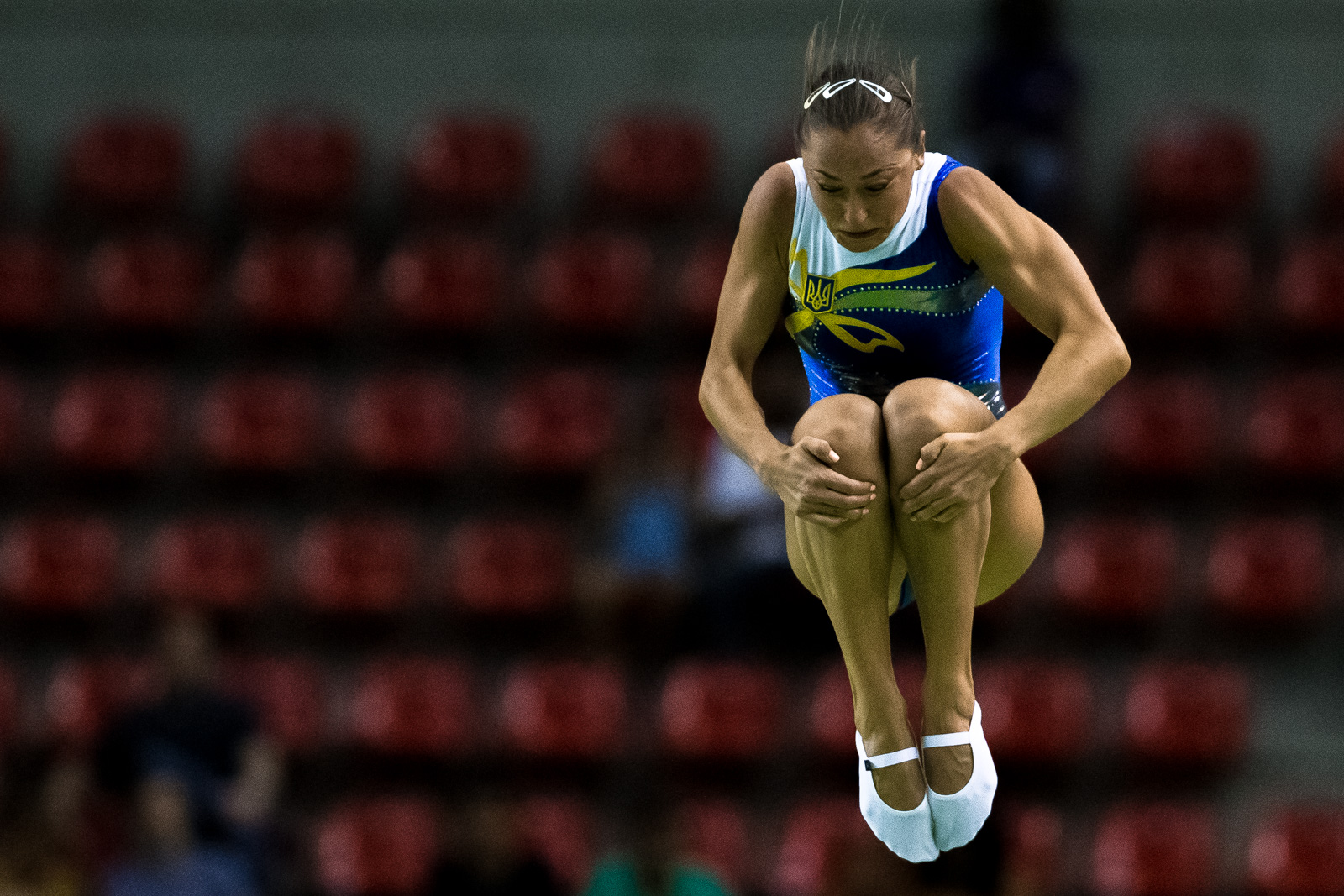
- Moskvina competing at the 2016 Gymnastics Olympic Test Event

Personal information
- Full name: Nataliia Yevhenivna Moskvina
- Born: 9 June 1988 (age 38) Kharkiv, Ukrainian SSR, Soviet Union
- Height: 167 cm (5 ft 6 in)

Gymnastics career
- Discipline: Trampoline gymnastics
- Country represented: Ukraine (2009(?)-)
- Club: ZSU/Kolos
- Head coach: Sergii Solomantin
- Assistant coach: Halyna Solomantina
Medal record
Women's trampoline gymnastics
Representing Ukraine
World Games
| Gold medal – first place | 2017 Wrocław | Synchro |
World Championships
| Bronze medal – third place | 2015 Odense | Synchro |
| Bronze medal – third place | 2013 Sofia | Synchro |

Nataliia Yevhenivna Moskvina (Ukrainian: Ната́лія Євге́нівна Москвіна́; born 9 June 1988 in Kharkiv) is a Ukrainian individual and synchronised trampoline gymnast, representing her nation at international competitions. She won the bronze medal at the 2013 World Games in Cali, Colombia.

She participated at the 2015 European Games in Baku. She competed at world championships, including at the 2009, 2010, 2011, 2013, 2014 and 2015 Trampoline World Championships.

She won the gold medal in Women's Synchro at The World Games 2017 in Wrocław, Poland.

== Personal life ==
She lives in Kharkiv, in the city where she also was born. She is also in the army.
