= 2015 Trampoline World Championships =

2015 world championship for trampoline gymnastics

- Venue: Stadium Arena Fyn
- Location: Odense, Denmark
- Dates: 25–28 November

The 31st Trampoline Gymnastics World Championships was held at the Stadium Arena Fyn in Odense, Denmark, from November 25–28, 2015. This event was the first qualifying round for the 2016 Olympics which was held in Rio de Janeiro. The top 8 men and women automatically earned their nation quota places for the Olympics, subject to a maximum of two quota places per nation. A further 16 of each sex will get a second chance to earn a quota place at the Rio de Janeiro test event in April 2016 for a further five spots.

== Medal summary ==
=== Medal table ===
Rank	Nation	Gold	Silver	Bronze	Total
1	China	8	3	2	13
2	Russia	3	2	4	9
3	United States	2	1	2	5
4	Canada	1	1	0	2
5	Belarus	0	4	2	6
6	Great Britain	0	4	0	4
7	Australia	0	0	1	1
7	France	0	0	1	1
7	Sweden	0	0	1	1
7	Ukraine	0	0	1	1
Totals (10 entries)		14	15	14	43

=== Results ===
Event	Gold	Silver	Bronze
Men
Individual	Gao Lei (CHN)	Uladzislau Hancharou (BLR)	Andrey Yudin (RUS)
Synchro	China; Tu Xiao; Dong Dong	Belarus; Mikalai Kazak; Uladzislau Hancharou	France; Sébastien Martiny; Allan Morante
Trampoline Team	Russia; Sergei Azarian; Andrey Yudin; Dmitry Ushakov; Mikhail Melnik	China; Xiao Jinyu; Dong Dong; Gao Lei; Tu Xiao	Belarus; Mikalai Kazak; Aleh Rabtsau; Uladzislau Hancharou; Artsiom Zhuk
Double Mini	Austin White (USA)	Mikhail Zalomin (RUS)	Matthew Weal (AUS)
Double Mini Team	Russia; Alexander Zebrov; Aleksandr Odintsov; Mikhail Zalomin; Andrei Gladenkov	Canada; Kyle Carragher; Denis Vachon; Jonathon Schwaiger; Douglas Armstrong United States; Alexander Renkert; Austin Nacey; Austin White; Garret Waterstradt	None awarded
Tumbling	Yang Song (CHN)	Timofei Podust (RUS)	Zhang Luo (CHN)
Tumbling Team	Russia; Andrey Krylov; Tagir Murtazaev; Timofei Podust; Grigory Noskov	China; Meng Wenchao; Liu Longji; Yang Song; Zhang Kuo	United States; Brandon Krzynefski; Alexander Renkert; Austin Nacey; Jackson Tyson
Women
Individual	Li Dan (CHN)	Liu Lingling (CHN)	Tatsiana Piatrenia (BLR)
Synchro	China; Zhong Xingping; Li Dan	Belarus; Tatsiana Piatrenia; Hanna Harchonak	Ukraine; Maryna Kyiko; Nataliia Moskvina
Trampoline Team	China; He Wenna; Li Dan; Liu Lingling; Zhong Xingping	Belarus; Maryia Lon; Hanna Harchonak; Tatsiana Piatrenia; Palina Badyhina	Russia; Nadezhda Glebova; Anna Kornetskaya; Yana Pavlova; Victoria Voronina
Double Mini	Erin Jauch (USA)	Jasmin Short (GBR)	Lina Sjoeberg (SWE)
Double Mini Team	Canada; Arden Oh; Danielle Gruber; Tamara O'Brien; Karine Dufour	Great Britain; Kirsty Way; Sapphire Dallard; Jasmin Short	United States; Tristan van Natta; Paige Howard; Erin Jauch; Kristle Lowell
Tumbling	Jia Fangfang (CHN)	Lucie Colebeck (GBR)	Chen Lingxi (CHN); Anna Korobeinikova (RUS)
Tumbling Team	China; Cai Qizi; Chen Lingxi; Jia Fangfang; Yang Yujie	Great Britain; Yasmin Taite; Lucie Colebeck; Rachel Davies; Ashleigh Long	Russia; Natalia Parakhina; Viktoriia Danilenko; Anna Korobeinikova; Anastasiia Isupova

== Men's results ==
=== Individual Trampoline ===
Qualification

Rank	Gymnast	Routine	D Score	E Score	T Score	Pen.	Total
1	Uladzislau Hancharou (BLR)	1st	3,400	28,200	18,705	50,305 (3)	110.975 Q
1	Uladzislau Hancharou (BLR)	2nd	17,300	25,500	17,870	60,67 (1)	110.975 Q
2	Lei Gao (CHN)	1st	3,400	28,200	19,405	51,005 (1)	110.800 Q
2	Lei Gao (CHN)	2nd	17,700	24,000	18,095	59,795 (3)	110.800 Q
3	Dmitrii Ushakov (RUS)	1st	3,100	28,200	18,940	50,24 (4)	110.170 Q
3	Dmitrii Ushakov (RUS)	2nd	16,700	25,500	17,830	59,93 (2)	110.170 Q
4	Dong Dong (CHN)	1st	3,400	28,500	18,300	50,2 (5)	109.875 Q
4	Dong Dong (CHN)	2nd	17,100	24,600	17,975	59,675 (4)	109.875 Q
5	Jinyu Xiao (CHN)	1st	3,400	28,200	18,465	50,065 (7)	109.425 Q
5	Jinyu Xiao (CHN)	2nd	17,300	24,900	17,160	59,36 (7)	109.425 Q
6	Tu Xiao (CHN)	1st	3,500	27,900	18,680	50,08 (6)	109.115 Q
6	Tu Xiao (CHN)	2nd	17,300	24,300	17,435	59,035 (8)	109.115 Q
7	Andrey Yudin (RUS)	1st	3,500	27,000	19,035	49,535 (9)	109.050 Q
7	Andrey Yudin (RUS)	2nd	16,900	24,300	18,315	59,515 (5)	109.050 Q
8	Masaki Ito (JPN)	1st	3,500	27,300	18,535	49,335 (12)	108.730 Q
8	Masaki Ito (JPN)	2nd	16,400	25,200	17,795	59,395 (6)	108.730 Q
9	Dylan Schmidt (NZL)	1st	3,300	28,500	18,695	50,495 (2)	108.455 Q
9	Dylan Schmidt (NZL)	2nd	16,200	24,000	17,760	57,96 (10)	108.455 Q
10	Aleh Rabtsau (BLR)	1st	3,100	27,300	18,415	48,815 (21)	107.615 Q
10	Aleh Rabtsau (BLR)	2nd	16,200	24,900	17,700	58,8 (9)	107.615 Q
11	Ginga Munetomo (JPN)	1st	3,300	27,900	18,235	49,435 (11)	106.420 Q
11	Ginga Munetomo (JPN)	2nd	16,400	23,400	17,185	56,985 (12)	106.420 Q
12	Allan Morante (FRA)	1st	3,200	27,000	19,100	49,3 (14)	106.245 Q
12	Allan Morante (FRA)	2nd	16,200	22,500	18,245	56,945 (14)	106.245 Q
13	Sébastien Martiny (FRA)	1st	2,700	27,900	18,380	48,98 (16)	105.965 Q
13	Sébastien Martiny (FRA)	2nd	16,000	23,700	17,285	56,985 (12)	105.965 Q
14	Nathan Bailey (GBR)	1st	2,700	27,600	18,615	48,915 (18)	105.480 Q
14	Nathan Bailey (GBR)	2nd	16,200	23,100	17,265	56,565 (20)	105.480 Q
15	Diogo Abreu (POR)	1st	3,300	27,000	19,140	49,44 (10)	105.195 Q
15	Diogo Abreu (POR)	2nd	17,300	20,700	17,755	55,755 (26)	105.195 Q
16	Jason Burnett (CAN)	1st	3,300	27,600	17,480	48,38 (25)	105.010 Q
16	Jason Burnett (CAN)	2nd	16,000	24,000	16,630	56,63 (18)	105.010 Q
17	Nicolas Schori (SUI)	1st	3,000	27,300	18,030	48,33 (27)	104.940 Q
17	Nicolas Schori (SUI)	2nd	16,500	23,400	16,710	56,61 (19)	104.940 Q
18	Pirmammad Aliyev (KAZ)	1st	2,900	27,900	18,060	48,86 (19)	104.725 Q
18	Pirmammad Aliyev (KAZ)	2nd	15,000	24,000	16,865	55,865 (25)	104.725 Q
19	Dmytro Byedyevkin (UKR)	1st	3,200	27,300	18,320	48,82 (20)	104.530 Q
19	Dmytro Byedyevkin (UKR)	2nd	15,800	22,500	17,410	55,71 (27)	104.530 Q
20	Diogo Ganchinho (POR)	1st	3,300	27,600	18,195	49,095 (15)	104.350 Q
20	Diogo Ganchinho (POR)	2nd	15,400	22,800	17,055	55,255 (31)	104.350 Q
21	Blake Gaudry (AUS)	1st	3,100	26,400	18,750	48,25 (33)	104.280 Q
21	Blake Gaudry (AUS)	2nd	16,000	22,800	17,230	56,03 (23)	104.280 Q
22	Angel Hernandez Recalde (COL)	1st	3,300	26,100	18,075	47,475 (50)	104.270 Q
22	Angel Hernandez Recalde (COL)	2nd	16,900	22,800	17,095	56,795 (16)	104.270 Q
23	Aliaksei Shostak (USA)	1st	2,500	26,700	18,285	47,485 (49)	104.155 Q
23	Aliaksei Shostak (USA)	2nd	15,400	24,000	17,270	56,67 (17)	104.155 Q
24	Jeffrey Gluckstein (USA)	1st	3,100	26,100	18,075	47,275 (56)	104.110 Q
24	Jeffrey Gluckstein (USA)	2nd	17,400	22,200	17,235	56,835 (15)	104.110 Q
25	Morgan Demiro-O-Domiro (FRA)	1st	3,200	27,000	18,305	48,505 (24)	103.795 Q
25	Morgan Demiro-O-Domiro (FRA)	2nd	15,400	22,800	17,090	55,29 (30)	103.795 Q
26	Mykola Prostorov (UKR)	1st	3,200	27,600	18,140	48,94 (17)	103.770 R1
26	Mykola Prostorov (UKR)	2nd	16,200	21,900	16,730	54,83 (37)	103.770 R1
27	Artur Zakrzewski (POL)	1st	2,900	27,900	17,980	48,78 (22)	103.655 R2
27	Artur Zakrzewski (POL)	2nd	16,000	21,900	16,975	54,875 (36)	103.655 R2
28	Daniel Schmidt (GER)	1st	2,900	27,000	17,460	47,36 (54)	103.340 R3
28	Daniel Schmidt (GER)	2nd	16,000	23,100	16,880	55,98 (24)	103.340 R3
29	Jonas Nordfors (SWE)	1st	3,100	26,400	18,580	48,08 (36)	103.305
29	Jonas Nordfors (SWE)	2nd	16,300	21,600	17,325	55,225 (33)	103.305
30	Sergei Azarian (RUS)	1st	2,900	27,600	18,245	48,745 (23)	103.210
30	Sergei Azarian (RUS)	2nd	15,100	22,200	17,165	54,465 (43)	103.210
31	Steven Gluckstein (USA)	1st	2,900	27,300	17,330	47,53 (47)	103.085
31	Steven Gluckstein (USA)	2nd	16,300	22,800	16,455	55,555 (29)	103.085
32	Logan Dooley (USA)	1st	3,100	27,300	17,920	48,32 (28)	103.000
32	Logan Dooley (USA)	2nd	16,200	22,200	16,280	54,68 (39)	103.000
33	Georgi Iliev (BUL)	1st	2,900	25,200	18,310	46,41 (75)	102.815
33	Georgi Iliev (BUL)	2nd	15,800	23,100	17,505	56,405 (21)	102.815
34	Artsiom Zhuk (BLR)	1st	3,100	26,700	18,325	48,125 (35)	102.770
34	Artsiom Zhuk (BLR)	2nd	15,400	22,200	17,045	54,645 (42)	102.770
35	Ilya Grishunin (AZE)	1st	3,100	27,600	18,610	49,31 (13)	102.665
35	Ilya Grishunin (AZE)	2nd	16,400	19,500	17,455	53,355 (56)	102.665
36	Rafael Andrade (BRA)	1st	2,700	25,800	18,255	46,755 (69)	102.325
36	Rafael Andrade (BRA)	2nd	15,600	23,400	16,570	55,57 (28)	102.325
37	Shaun Swadling (AUS)	1st	3,400	26,400	18,185	47,985 (38)	102.210
37	Shaun Swadling (AUS)	2nd	16,700	20,700	16,825	54,225 (45)	102.210
38	Luke Strong (GBR)	1st	2,900	24,600	18,325	45,825 (88)	102.185
38	Luke Strong (GBR)	2nd	16,200	22,500	17,660	56,36 (22)	102.185
39	Oscar Smith (SWE)	1st	2,700	26,400	18,160	47,26 (58)	102.040
39	Oscar Smith (SWE)	2nd	15,800	21,900	17,080	54,78 (38)	102.040
40	Jack Penny (AUS)	1st	3,100	26,100	18,440	47,64 (45)	101.935
40	Jack Penny (AUS)	2nd	15,800	21,000	17,495	54,295 (44)	101.935
41	Daniel Praest (DEN)	1st	3,300	26,100	17,860	47,26 (58)	101.915
41	Daniel Praest (DEN)	2nd	15,400	22,200	17,055	54,655 (40)	101.915
42	Dmitriy Fedorovskiy (AZE)	1st	3,500	25,800	17,425	46,725 (71)	101.670
42	Dmitriy Fedorovskiy (AZE)	2nd	16,600	21,900	16,445	54,945 (35)	101.670
43	Bartlomiej Hes (POL)	1st	3,400	26,100	17,815	47,315 (55)	101.425
43	Bartlomiej Hes (POL)	2nd	16,000	21,600	16,510	54,11 (49)	101.425
44	Anton Davydenko (UKR)	1st	3,100	27,000	17,170	47,27 (57)	101.395
44	Anton Davydenko (UKR)	2nd	15,600	21,900	16,625	54,125 (47)	101.395
45	Samirbek Usmonov (UZB)	1st	2,900	27,600	17,115	47,615 (46)	101.290
45	Samirbek Usmonov (UZB)	2nd	14,200	23,100	16,375	53,675 (52)	101.290
46	Alvaro Calero (COL)	1st	2,900	24,900	18,030	45,83 (87)	100.965
46	Alvaro Calero (COL)	2nd	16,000	22,200	16,935	55,135 (34)	100.965
47	Kierran Tuhi (NZL)	1st	2,900	25,500	18,730	47,13 (63)	100.625
47	Kierran Tuhi (NZL)	2nd	16,200	20,400	16,895	53,495 (53)	100.625
48	Joris Geens (BEL)	1st	3,000	25,800	17,820	46,62 (74)	100.535
48	Joris Geens (BEL)	2nd	15,800	21,300	16,815	53,915 (50)	100.535
49	Khusanboy Jonibekov (UZB)	1st	3,200	26,400	17,895	47,495 (48)	100.450
49	Khusanboy Jonibekov (UZB)	2nd	14,400	21,900	16,655	52,955 (60)	100.450
50	Pedro Ribeiro Ferreira (POR)	1st	3,400	23,400	18,280	45,08 (95)	100.330
50	Pedro Ribeiro Ferreira (POR)	2nd	16,000	21,900	17,350	55,25 (32)	100.330
51	Lucas Adorno (ARG)	1st	2,900	26,100	17,760	46,66 (72)	100.065
51	Lucas Adorno (ARG)	2nd	15,200	21,300	17,005	53,405 (55)	100.065
52	Armando Loria Cetina (MEX)	1st	3,900	24,900	17,050	45,85 (86)	99.970
52	Armando Loria Cetina (MEX)	2nd	16,700	21,300	16,120	54,12 (48)	99.970
53	Ty Swadling (AUS)	1st	3,300	25,200	18,130	46,63 (73)	99.955
53	Ty Swadling (AUS)	2nd	15,800	20,700	16,825	53,325 (57)	99.955
54	Ruslan Aghamirov (AZE)	1st	1,900	26,400	17,615	45,915 (85)	99.715
54	Ruslan Aghamirov (AZE)	2nd	15,400	21,900	16,500	53,8 (51)	99.715
55	Naim Ashhab (CZE)	1st	2,900	25,500	17,555	45,955 (82)	99.190
55	Naim Ashhab (CZE)	2nd	15,200	21,300	16,735	53,235 (58)	99.190
56	Marc Torras Gonzalez (ESP)	1st	2,900	26,400	16,975	46,275 (78)	98.890
56	Marc Torras Gonzalez (ESP)	2nd	14,600	21,900	16,115	52,615 (62)	98.890
57	Jimmy Raymond (SUI)	1st	2,700	26,700	17,745	47,145 (62)	98.870
57	Jimmy Raymond (SUI)	2nd	15,000	20,100	16,625	51,725 (66)	98.870
58	Jorge Martin (ESP)	1st	2,500	25,500	17,955	45,955 (82)	98.640
58	Jorge Martin (ESP)	2nd	14,600	21,000	17,085	52,685 (61)	98.640
59	Amiran Babayan (UZB)	1st	2,900	26,400	18,145	47,445 (51)	98.135
59	Amiran Babayan (UZB)	2nd	13,400	21,900	15,390	50,69 (72)	98.135
60	Mokhirbek Olimjonov (UZB)	1st	2,900	27,600	17,735	48,235 (34)	98.095
60	Mokhirbek Olimjonov (UZB)	2nd	12,800	22,200	14,860	49,86 (79)	98.095
61	Marios Grapsas (GRE)	1st	3,100	26,700	17,375	47,175 (61)	98.075
61	Marios Grapsas (GRE)	2nd	13,900	20,400	16,600	50,9 (69)	98.075
62	Martin Pelc (CZE)	1st	2,500	27,300	17,180	46,98 (66)	97.925
62	Martin Pelc (CZE)	2nd	15,000	19,800	16,145	50,945 (68)	97.925
63	Loic Lenoir (BEL)	1st	2,900	26,400	17,515	46,815 (68)	97.015
63	Loic Lenoir (BEL)	2nd	15,000	18,900	16,300	50,2 (76)	97.015
64	Benjamin Kjaer (DEN)	1st	2,700	25,500	16,875	45,075 (96)	96.725
64	Benjamin Kjaer (DEN)	2nd	15,000	20,400	16,250	51,65 (67)	96.725
65	Jakob Kaj Schoppe (DEN)	1st	2,700	23,400	17,585	43,685 (104)	96.680
65	Jakob Kaj Schoppe (DEN)	2nd	15,000	21,000	16,995	52,995 (59)	96.680
66	Christian Andersen (DEN)	1st	2,700	25,500	17,760	45,96 (81)	96.535
66	Christian Andersen (DEN)	2nd	14,600	19,200	16,775	50,575 (73)	96.535
67	Alessandro Lucarelli (ITA)	1st	2,900	22,500	17,710	43,11 (107)	95.710
67	Alessandro Lucarelli (ITA)	2nd	14,200	21,600	16,800	52,6 (63)	95.710
68	Simon Debacker (BEL)	1st	1,700	24,900	16,265	42,865 (108)	95.355
68	Simon Debacker (BEL)	2nd	15,200	20,400	16,890	52,49 (64)	95.355
69	Yasuhiro Ueyama (JPN)	1st	2,700	21,600	17,490	41,79 (114)	95.265
69	Yasuhiro Ueyama (JPN)	2nd	16,600	19,200	17,675	53,475 (54)	95.265
70	Samory Ortiz Cruz (PUR)	1st	3,100	24,000	16,900	44 (102)	94.265
70	Samory Ortiz Cruz (PUR)	2nd	13,400	21,000	15,865	50,265 (75)	94.265
71	Ioannis Toptidis (GRE)	1st	2,700	21,600	17,505	41,805 (113)	94.160
71	Ioannis Toptidis (GRE)	2nd	13,800	22,500	16,055	52,355 (65)	94.160
72	Luiz Arruda Junior (BRA)	1st	2,700	24,000	17,315	44,015 (101)	93.920
72	Luiz Arruda Junior (BRA)	2nd	14,000	19,800	16,105	49,905 (78)	93.920
73	Nikolaos Savvidis (GRE)	1st	3,300	24,000	16,735	44,035 (100)	93.665
73	Nikolaos Savvidis (GRE)	2nd	14,800	18,900	15,930	49,63 (80)	93.665
74	Stefano Luciani (ITA)	1st	3,300	22,500	16,905	42,705 (110)	93.500
74	Stefano Luciani (ITA)	2nd	13,800	20,700	16,295	50,795 (71)	93.500
75	Ben Van Overberghe (BEL)	1st	3,100	25,500	17,560	46,16 (79)	92.870
75	Ben Van Overberghe (BEL)	2nd	13,800	18,000	14,910	46,71 (84)	92.870
76	Maxim Raskazov (KAZ)	1st	2,900	25,200	17,285	45,385 (94)	92.185
76	Maxim Raskazov (KAZ)	2nd	12,400	19,800	14,600	46,8 (83)	92.185
77	Kayvon Arasteh (GBR)	1st	2,800	26,100	17,835	46,735 (70)	90.565
77	Kayvon Arasteh (GBR)	2nd	12,500	17,700	13,630	43,83 (89)	90.565
78	Bernardo Aquino (ARG)	1st	3,100	21,900	15,460	40,36 (117)	90.275
78	Bernardo Aquino (ARG)	2nd	12,700	20,700	16,515	49,915 (77)	90.275
79	Seif Asser Sherif (EGY)	1st	3,300	23,700	16,305	43,305 (106)	90.140
79	Seif Asser Sherif (EGY)	2nd	12,500	18,900	15,435	46,835 (82)	90.140
80	Vladimir Hoyos Quinones (VEN)	1st	2,700	24,900	16,170	43,77 (103)	89.995
80	Vladimir Hoyos Quinones (VEN)	2nd	11,100	19,800	15,325	46,225 (85)	89.995
81	Tomasz Krzemien (POL)	1st	3,100	24,600	17,830	45,53 (92)	89.710
81	Tomasz Krzemien (POL)	2nd	12,100	18,000	14,080	44,18 (88)	89.710
82	Kyrylo Sonn (GER)	1st	0,000	19,200	13,095	32,295 (119)	89.545
82	Kyrylo Sonn (GER)	2nd	16,700	23,400	17,150	57,25 (11)	89.545
83	Sergey Artemiev (ISR)	1st	2,700	23,400	15,885	41,985 (112)	89.440
83	Sergey Artemiev (ISR)	2nd	12,800	19,200	15,455	47,455 (81)	89.440
84	Ahmed Rady Mostafa (EGY)	1st	2,900	23,100	16,685	42,685 (111)	88.475
84	Ahmed Rady Mostafa (EGY)	2nd	12,000	18,300	15,490	45,79 (86)	88.475
85	Trevor Stirling (CAN)	1st	2,700	26,100	17,025	45,825 (88)	87.830
85	Trevor Stirling (CAN)	2nd	11,800	15,900	14,305	42,005 (92)	87.830
86	Cesar Prieto (MEX)	1st	2,700	25,500	17,290	45,49 (93)	87.640
86	Cesar Prieto (MEX)	2nd	12,700	16,200	13,250	42,15 (91)	87.640
87	Oleg Piunov (AZE)	1st	3,300	26,100	18,310	47,71 (43)	86.665
87	Oleg Piunov (AZE)	2nd	11,300	15,600	12,055	38,955 (94)	86.665
88	Gal Bello (ISR)	1st	2,500	22,800	15,175	40,475 (116)	84.715
88	Gal Bello (ISR)	2nd	10,900	18,900	14,440	44,24 (87)	84.715
89	Ahmed Abouelela Mohamed (EGY)	1st	1,900	22,800	16,770	41,47 (115)	84.520
89	Ahmed Abouelela Mohamed (EGY)	2nd	6,600	21,300	15,150	43,05 (90)	84.520
90	Mikalai Kazak (BLR)	1st	2,900	27,600	17,780	48,28 (31)	83.180
90	Mikalai Kazak (BLR)	2nd	10,200	14,400	10,300	34,9 (95)	83.180
91	Lukasz Tomaszewski (POL)	1st	2,900	26,700	18,070	47,67 (44)	82.095
91	Lukasz Tomaszewski (POL)	2nd	9,600	14,100	10,725	34,425 (97)	82.095
92	Krystof Baumelt (CZE)	1st	0,000	18,600	12,450	31,05 (120)	81.940
92	Krystof Baumelt (CZE)	2nd	14,000	20,400	16,490	50,89 (70)	81.940
93	Dario Aloi (ITA)	1st	2,900	26,400	17,545	46,845 (67)	81.400
93	Dario Aloi (ITA)	2nd	9,400	15,000	10,155	34,555 (96)	81.400
94	Omar Abou El Fetouh (EGY)	1st	2,700	21,300	16,135	40,135 (118)	81.025
94	Omar Abou El Fetouh (EGY)	2nd	10,500	15,300	15,090	40,89 (93)	81.025
95	Adam Suelt (CZE)	1st	2,700	27,000	17,710	47,41 (53)	78.205
95	Adam Suelt (CZE)	2nd	8,600	12,000	10,195	30,795 (98)	78.205
96	Keegan Soehn (CAN)	1st	2,300	27,900	17,775	47,975 (40)	76.750
96	Keegan Soehn (CAN)	2nd	8,900	11,400	8,475	28,775 (99)	76.750
97	Jaime Ponce (ESP)	1st	3,300	26,100	17,610	47,01 (65)	75.190
97	Jaime Ponce (ESP)	2nd	8,000	11,700	8,480	28,18 (100)	75.190
98	Ricardo Santos (POR)	1st	3,400	24,300	18,115	45,815 (90)	73.200
98	Ricardo Santos (POR)	2nd	8,400	10,200	8,785	27,385 (102)	73.200
99	Maans Aaberg (SWE)	1st	2,900	23,700	17,920	44,52 (97)	72.020
99	Maans Aaberg (SWE)	2nd	8,400	10,500	8,600	27,5 (101)	72.020
100	Apostolos Koutavas (GRE)	1st	3,600	26,700	18,075	48,375 (26)	71.500
100	Apostolos Koutavas (GRE)	2nd	7,100	9,000	7,025	23,125 (104)	71.500
101	Fabian Vogel (GER)	1st	3,000	26,100	17,920	47,02 (64)	70.160
101	Fabian Vogel (GER)	2nd	6,700	9,600	6,840	23,14 (103)	70.160
102	Dmytro Sobakar (UKR)	1st	3,300	27,000	17,680	47,98 (39)	68.155
102	Dmytro Sobakar (UKR)	2nd	6,300	6,900	6,975	20,175 (106)	68.155
103	Oswaldo Antonio Prieto Angel (MEX)	1st	3,100	27,300	17,905	48,305 (29)	67.210
103	Oswaldo Antonio Prieto Angel (MEX)	2nd	4,500	7,500	6,905	18,905 (107)	67.210
104	Yasen Ivanov (BUL)	1st	2,500	24,900	16,745	44,145 (98)	66.965
104	Yasen Ivanov (BUL)	2nd	7,400	8,700	6,720	22,82 (105)	66.965
105	Martin Gromowski (GER)	1st	3,000	27,300	17,995	48,295 (30)	66.775
105	Martin Gromowski (GER)	2nd	5,500	7,500	5,480	18,48 (108)	66.775
106	Mikhail Melnik (RUS)	1st	3,100	26,100	18,690	47,89 (41)	65.325
106	Mikhail Melnik (RUS)	2nd	5,800	6,000	5,635	17,435 (111)	65.325
107	Carlos Ramirez Pala (BRA)	1st	2,900	26,100	18,205	47,205 (60)	64.880
107	Carlos Ramirez Pala (BRA)	2nd	5,500	6,600	5,575	17,675 (110)	64.880
108	Rafael Fatkhelyanov (KAZ)	1st	3,300	26,100	18,045	47,445 (51)	64.830
108	Rafael Fatkhelyanov (KAZ)	2nd	4,900	7,200	5,285	17,385 (112)	64.830
109	David Vega (ESP)	1st	1,900	4,800	3,575	10,275 (121)	64.490
109	David Vega (ESP)	2nd	14,200	23,100	16,915	54,215 (46)	64.490
110	Danil Mussabayev (KAZ)	1st	0,000	5,700	3,715	9,415 (123)	64.070
110	Danil Mussabayev (KAZ)	2nd	15,400	22,200	17,055	54,655 (40)	64.070
111	Kyle Soehn (CAN)	1st	2,700	25,800	17,435	45,935 (84)	63.640
111	Kyle Soehn (CAN)	2nd	5,500	6,900	5,305	17,705 (109)	63.640
112	Natanael Camara Rodriguez (PUR)	1st	3,100	25,800	17,430	46,33 (76)	63.105
112	Natanael Camara Rodriguez (PUR)	2nd	5,100	6,300	5,375	16,775 (113)	63.105
113	Tengizi Koshkadze (GEO)	1st	2,900	26,100	18,805	47,805 (42)	60.135
113	Tengizi Koshkadze (GEO)	2nd	3,800	4,800	3,730	12,33 (115)	60.135
114	Flavio Cannone (ITA)	1st	3,200	27,000	18,060	48,26 (32)	60.020
114	Flavio Cannone (ITA)	2nd	3,300	4,800	3,660	11,76 (116)	60.020
115	Alon Katz (ISR)	1st	2,100	4,200	3,510	9,71 (122)	60.000
115	Alon Katz (ISR)	2nd	14,800	19,800	15,790	50,29 (74)	60.000
116	Mate Toro (HUN)	1st	3,100	24,300	16,690	44,09 (99)	59.390
116	Mate Toro (HUN)	2nd	4,900	5,400	5,000	15,3 (114)	59.390
117	Gurkan Mutlu (TUR)	1st	3,100	25,200	17,800	46,1 (80)	57.735
117	Gurkan Mutlu (TUR)	2nd	3,600	4,500	3,535	11,635 (117)	57.735
118	Romain Legros (FRA)	1st	2,700	27,000	18,290	47,99 (37)	54.270
118	Romain Legros (FRA)	2nd	2,000	2,400	1,880	6,28 (119)	54.270
119	Federico Cury (ARG)	1st	2,700	24,000	16,870	43,47 (105)	53.450
119	Federico Cury (ARG)	2nd	2,100	4,500	3,480	9,98 (118)	53.450
120	Zsolt Mate Juhasz (HUN)	1st	2,500	26,100	17,825	46,325 (77)	52.095
120	Zsolt Mate Juhasz (HUN)	2nd	2,000	2,100	1,770	5,77 (122)	52.095
121	Alberto Vargas (MEX)	1st	2,900	25,200	17,695	45,795 (91)	51.750
121	Alberto Vargas (MEX)	2nd	2,000	2,100	1,855	5,955 (120)	51.750
122	Tetsuya Sotomura (JPN)	1st	3,400	27,600	18,670	49,67 (8)	49.670
122	Tetsuya Sotomura (JPN)	2nd	0,000	0,000	0,000	0 (123)	49.670
123	Santiago Gabriel Marcano (VEN)	1st	3,200	23,700	15,880	42,78 (109)	48.580

Final

Rank	Gymnast	D Score	E Score	T Score	Pen.	Total
1st place, gold medalist(s)	(China) Gao Lei	18.400	25.500	18.345		62.245
2nd place, silver medalist(s)	(Belarus) Uladzislau Hancharou	17.300	26.100	18.340		61.740
3rd place, bronze medalist(s)	(Russia) Andrey Yudin	16.900	26.400	18.405		61.705
4	(Japan) Ito Masaki	17.200	26.175	18.145		61.445
5	(Russia) Dmitry Ushakov	17.100	25.800	18.325		61.225
6	(France) Demiro-O-Domiro Morgan	16.700	24.300	17.730		58.730
7	(China) Xiao Jinyu	3.600	5.100	3.745		12.445
8	(Japan) Munetomo Ginga	2.200	2.700	1.925		6.825

=== Synchro ===
Position	Team	D Score	E Score	S Score	Penalty	Total
1st place, gold medalist(s)	China; Tu Xiao; Dong Dong	17.100	17.200	18.600	0.000	52.900
2nd place, silver medalist(s)	Belarus; Kazak Mikalai; Uladzislau Hancharou	15.600	17.000	18.200	0.000	50.800
3rd place, bronze medalist(s)	France; Sébastien Martiny; Allan Morante	15.600	16.200	18.200	0.000	50.000
4	Australia; Dominic Clarke; Matthew Weal	15.600	14.800	18.600	0.000	49.000
5	Ukraine; Dmytro Byedyevkin; Mykola Prostorov	8.400	7.600	9.200	0.000	25.200
6	Japan; Yasuhiro Ueyama; Masaki Ito	5.500	5.400	5.800	0.000	16.700
7	Russia; Mikhail Melnik; Sergei Azarian	5.500	4.700	5.400	0.000	15.600
8	United States; Logan Dooley; Steven Gluckstein	3.800	3.300	3.200	0.000	10.300

=== Trampoline Team ===
Rank	Team	Score
1st place, gold medalist(s)	Russia	178.065
1st place, gold medalist(s)	Azarian Sergei	58.420
1st place, gold medalist(s)	Andrey Yudin	59.115
1st place, gold medalist(s)	Dmitry Ushakov	60.530
1st place, gold medalist(s)	Melnik Mikhail	-
2nd place, silver medalist(s)	China	178.025
2nd place, silver medalist(s)	Xiao Jinyu	58.545
2nd place, silver medalist(s)	Dong Dong	59.170
2nd place, silver medalist(s)	Gao Lei	60.310
2nd place, silver medalist(s)	Tu Xiao	-
3rd place, bronze medalist(s)	Belarus	172.585
3rd place, bronze medalist(s)	Kazak Mikalai	56.370
3rd place, bronze medalist(s)	Rabtsau Aleh	57.320
3rd place, bronze medalist(s)	Uladzislau Hancharou	58.895
3rd place, bronze medalist(s)	Zhuk Artsiom	-
4	France	144.275
4	Morante Allan	28.110
4	Demiro-O-Domiro Morgan	58.545
4	Martiny Sébastien	57.620
4	Legros Romain	-
5	Japan	125.610
5	Sotomura Tetsuya	58.925
5	Ito Masaki	59.770
5	Ueyama Yasuhiro	6.915
5	Munetomo Ginga	-

=== Double Mini ===
Rank	Gymnast	D Score	E Score	Penalty	Score	Total
1st place, gold medalist(s)	(United States) Austin White	9.600	28.500		38.100	79.600
1st place, gold medalist(s)	(United States) Austin White	12.400	29.100		41.500	79.600
2nd place, silver medalist(s)	(Russia) Mikhail Zalomin	10.400	27.000		37.400	78.400
2nd place, silver medalist(s)	(Russia) Mikhail Zalomin	11.600	29.400		41.000	78.400
3rd place, bronze medalist(s)	(Australia) Matthew Weal	11.600	26.700		38.300	74.800
3rd place, bronze medalist(s)	(Australia) Matthew Weal	8.000	28.500		36.500	74.800
4	(Spain) Daniel Pérez	9.200	26.100		35.300	74.200
4	(Spain) Daniel Pérez	13.100	25.800		38.900	74.200
5	(Russia) Aleksandr Odintsov	10.800	25.200		36.000	74.100
5	(Russia) Aleksandr Odintsov	10.800	27.300		38.100	74.100
6	(Canada) Denis Vachon	9.200	26.700		35.900	72.800
6	(Canada) Denis Vachon	9.600	27.300		36.900	72.800
7	(Canada) Douglas Armstrong	9.500	26.700		36.200	69.100
7	(Canada) Douglas Armstrong	8.300	24.600		32.900	69.100
8	(United States) Austin Nacey	0.000	0.000		0.000	35.400
8	(United States) Austin Nacey	9.600	25.800		35.400	35.400

=== Double Mini Team ===
Rank	Team	Score
1st place, gold medalist(s)	Russia	117.700
1st place, gold medalist(s)	Alexander Zebrov	39.100
1st place, gold medalist(s)	Aleksandr Odintsov	38.400
1st place, gold medalist(s)	Mikhail Zalomin	40.200
1st place, gold medalist(s)	Andrei Gladenkov	-
2nd place, silver medalist(s)	Canada	109.300
2nd place, silver medalist(s)	Kyle Carragher	36.300
2nd place, silver medalist(s)	Denis Vachon	36.200
2nd place, silver medalist(s)	Jonathon Schwaiger	36.800
2nd place, silver medalist(s)	Douglas Armstrong	-
2nd place, silver medalist(s)	United States	109.300
2nd place, silver medalist(s)	Alexander Renkert	37.100
2nd place, silver medalist(s)	Austin Nacey	32.600
2nd place, silver medalist(s)	Austin White	39.600
2nd place, silver medalist(s)	Garret Waterstradt	-
4	Australia	107.900
4	Dominic Clarke	37.100
4	Matthew Weal	36.600
4	Damien Axelsen	34.200
4	Ryan Hatfield	-
5	Denmark	101.600
5	Emil Mortensen	34.200
5	Martin Frederiksen	31.800
5	Oliver Kew	35.600
5	Mikkel Joergensen	-

=== Tumbling ===
Rank	Gymnast	D Score	E Score	Penalty	Score	Total
1st place, gold medalist(s)	(China) Yang Song	12.000	27.600		39.600	79.100
1st place, gold medalist(s)	(China) Yang Song	11.300	28.200		39.500	79.100
2nd place, silver medalist(s)	(Russia) Timofei Podust	12.100	27.000		39.100	78.300
2nd place, silver medalist(s)	(Russia) Timofei Podust	11.600	27.600		39.200	78.300
3rd place, bronze medalist(s)	(China) Zhang Kuo	11.300	28.200		39.500	77.000
3rd place, bronze medalist(s)	(China) Zhang Kuo	9.600	27.900		37.500	77.000
4	(United Kingdom) Kristof Willerton	9.600	27.600		37.200	76.000
4	(United Kingdom) Kristof Willerton	10.900	27.900		38.800	76.000
5	(Denmark) Anders Wesch	10.400	26.400		36.800	74.000
5	(Denmark) Anders Wesch	11.100	26.100		37.200	74.000
6	(Russia) Andrey Krylov	10.400	24.000		34.400	72.200
6	(Russia) Andrey Krylov	11.100	26.700		37.800	72.200
7	(Belarus) Dzmitry Darashuk	9.600	24.300		33.900	72.100
7	(Belarus) Dzmitry Darashuk	10.900	27.300		38.200	72.100
8	(United States) Austin Nacey	8.200	27.000		35.200	69.600
8	(United States) Austin Nacey	8.300	26.100		34.400	69.600

=== Tumbling Team ===
Rank	Team	Score
1st place, gold medalist(s)	Russia	118.000
1st place, gold medalist(s)	Andrey Krylov	40.300
1st place, gold medalist(s)	Tagir Murtazaev	38.200
1st place, gold medalist(s)	Timofei Podust	39.500
1st place, gold medalist(s)	Grigory Noskov	-
2nd place, silver medalist(s)	China	116.600
2nd place, silver medalist(s)	Meng Wenchao	37.500
2nd place, silver medalist(s)	Liu Longji	39.300
2nd place, silver medalist(s)	Yang Song	39.800
2nd place, silver medalist(s)	Zhang Kuo	-
3rd place, bronze medalist(s)	United States	110.000
3rd place, bronze medalist(s)	Brandon Krzynefski	36.500
3rd place, bronze medalist(s)	Alexander Renkert	35.400
3rd place, bronze medalist(s)	Austin Nacey	38.100
3rd place, bronze medalist(s)	Jackson Tyson	-
4	Great Britain	109.900
4	Michael Barnes	34.300
4	Elliott Browne	36.900
4	Kristof Willerton	38.700
4	Izzidien Abdullah	-
5	Canada	102.600
5	Nicholas Jackson	33.900
5	Michael Chaves	33.100
5	Jonathon Schwaiger	35.600
5	David Findlay	-

== Women's Results ==
=== Individual Trampoline ===
Qualification

Rank	Gymnast	Routine	D Score	E Score	T Score	Pen.	Total
1	Dan Li (CHN)	1st	2,700	28,500	17,195	48,395 (1)	103.130 Q
1	Dan Li (CHN)	2nd	15,000	24,000	15,735	54,735 (4)	103.130 Q
2	Wenna He (CHN)	1st	2,700	27,900	17,445	48,045 (2)	103.105 Q
2	Wenna He (CHN)	2nd	14,800	24,300	15,960	55,06 (1)	103.105 Q
3	Lingling Liu (CHN)	1st	2,700	27,000	17,495	47,195 (6)	102.185 Q
3	Lingling Liu (CHN)	2nd	14,400	23,700	16,890	54,99 (2)	102.185 Q
4	Rosannagh Maclennan (CAN)	1st	2,700	27,300	16,915	46,915 (9)	101.905 Q
4	Rosannagh Maclennan (CAN)	2nd	14,600	24,300	16,090	54,99 (2)	101.905 Q
5	Xingping Zhong (CHN)	1st	2,700	27,600	16,980	47,28 (4)	101.670 Q
5	Xingping Zhong (CHN)	2nd	14,400	24,000	15,990	54,39 (8)	101.670 Q
6	Pamela Clark (GBR)	1st	2,900	26,700	16,935	46,535 (15)	101.135 Q
6	Pamela Clark (GBR)	2nd	15,200	23,100	16,300	54,6 (6)	101.135 Q
7	Hanna Harchonak (BLR)	1st	2,900	27,000	17,440	47,34 (3)	100.965 Q
7	Hanna Harchonak (BLR)	2nd	13,100	24,300	16,225	53,625 (10)	100.965 Q
8	Yana Pavlova (RUS)	1st	2,900	26,700	16,795	46,395 (18)	100.840 Q
8	Yana Pavlova (RUS)	2nd	14,800	23,400	16,245	54,445 (7)	100.840 Q
9	Charlotte Drury (USA)	1st	2,700	26,400	17,090	46,19 (20)	100.825 Q
9	Charlotte Drury (USA)	2nd	14,600	23,700	16,335	54,635 (5)	100.825 Q
10	Bryony Page (GBR)	1st	2,900	27,000	16,760	46,66 (12)	100.715 Q
10	Bryony Page (GBR)	2nd	14,400	24,000	15,655	54,055 (9)	100.715 Q
11	Tatsiana Piatrenia (BLR)	1st	2,900	27,300	16,965	47,165 (7)	100.605 Q
11	Tatsiana Piatrenia (BLR)	2nd	14,600	22,800	16,040	53,44 (14)	100.605 Q
12	Katherine Driscoll (GBR)	1st	2,700	27,300	16,825	46,825 (10)	100.440 Q
12	Katherine Driscoll (GBR)	2nd	14,400	23,400	15,815	53,615 (11)	100.440 Q
13	Nataliia Moskvina (UKR)	1st	2,900	27,300	16,525	46,725 (11)	100.170 Q
13	Nataliia Moskvina (UKR)	2nd	14,000	23,400	16,045	53,445 (13)	100.170 Q
14	Luba Golovina (GEO)	1st	2,900	27,000	17,230	47,13 (8)	100.035 Q
14	Luba Golovina (GEO)	2nd	12,900	24,000	16,005	52,905 (18)	100.035 Q
15	Ana Rente (POR)	1st	3,100	26,400	16,995	46,495 (16)	99.880 Q
15	Ana Rente (POR)	2nd	13,800	23,400	16,185	53,385 (15)	99.880 Q
16	Ekaterina Khilko (UZB)	1st	2,900	27,300	17,045	47,245 (5)	99.415 Q
16	Ekaterina Khilko (UZB)	2nd	14,600	22,200	15,370	52,17 (26)	99.415 Q
17	Victoria Voronina (RUS)	1st	2,700	27,000	16,930	46,63 (13)	99.290 Q
17	Victoria Voronina (RUS)	2nd	14,400	22,500	15,760	52,66 (20)	99.290 Q
18	Maryna Kyiko (UKR)	1st	2,900	27,300	16,295	46,495 (16)	99.110 Q
18	Maryna Kyiko (UKR)	2nd	14,000	22,800	15,815	52,615 (21)	99.110 Q
19	Nadezhda Glebova (RUS)	1st	2,000	26,700	16,800	45,5 (29)	99.045 Q
19	Nadezhda Glebova (RUS)	2nd	13,600	23,700	16,245	53,545 (12)	99.045 Q
20	Amanda Parker (GBR)	1st	2,800	26,100	16,205	45,105 (37)	98.200
20	Amanda Parker (GBR)	2nd	14,400	23,400	15,295	53,095 (16)	98.200
21	Ayano Kishi (JPN)	1st	2,200	26,400	16,505	45,105 (37)	98.190 Q
21	Ayano Kishi (JPN)	2nd	13,400	23,700	15,985	53,085 (17)	98.190 Q
22	Rana Nakano (JPN)	1st	2,700	26,100	16,470	45,27 (33)	97.995 Q
22	Rana Nakano (JPN)	2nd	14,100	22,800	15,825	52,725 (19)	97.995 Q
23	Karen Cockburn (CAN)	1st	2,300	26,700	17,030	46,03 (23)	97.975 Q
23	Karen Cockburn (CAN)	2nd	13,300	23,100	15,545	51,945 (28)	97.975 Q
24	Chisato Doihata (JPN)	1st	3,300	26,100	16,080	45,48 (30)	97.760 Q
24	Chisato Doihata (JPN)	2nd	13,100	23,700	15,480	52,28 (24)	97.760 Q
25	Maryia Lon (BLR)	1st	2,000	26,700	16,880	45,58 (28)	97.680 Q
25	Maryia Lon (BLR)	2nd	13,100	23,400	15,600	52,1 (27)	97.680 Q
26	Reina Satake (JPN)	1st	3,300	25,800	16,080	45,18 (34)	97.620
26	Reina Satake (JPN)	2nd	13,500	23,400	15,540	52,44 (22)	97.620
27	Leonie Adam (GER)	1st	2,700	27,000	16,415	46,115 (21)	97.235 Q
27	Leonie Adam (GER)	2nd	13,100	22,200	15,820	51,12 (32)	97.235 Q
28	Marine Jurbert (FRA)	1st	2,300	27,000	16,470	45,77 (25)	97.185 R1
28	Marine Jurbert (FRA)	2nd	12,100	23,700	15,615	51,415 (30)	97.185 R1
29	Anna Kasparyan (UZB)	1st	2,900	26,100	16,720	45,72 (27)	96.720 R2
29	Anna Kasparyan (UZB)	2nd	12,600	22,800	15,600	51 (33)	96.720 R2
30	Kirsten Boersma (NED)	1st	2,700	25,200	16,250	44,15 (53)	96.495 R3
30	Kirsten Boersma (NED)	2nd	13,800	23,100	15,445	52,345 (23)	96.495 R3
31	Lila Kasapoglou (GRE)	1st	3,100	26,400	16,265	45,765 (26)	96.000
31	Lila Kasapoglou (GRE)	2nd	12,800	21,900	15,535	50,235 (43)	96.000
32	Dafne Carolina Navarro Loza (MEX)	1st	2,700	24,900	16,100	43,7 (56)	95.970
32	Dafne Carolina Navarro Loza (MEX)	2nd	14,200	22,800	15,270	52,27 (25)	95.970
33	Nicole Ahsinger (USA)	1st	2,700	25,800	16,505	45,005 (40)	95.750
33	Nicole Ahsinger (USA)	2nd	13,900	21,600	15,245	50,745 (37)	95.750
34	Fanny Chilo (SUI)	1st	2,700	25,500	16,620	44,82 (43)	95.695
34	Fanny Chilo (SUI)	2nd	12,900	22,500	15,475	50,875 (34)	95.695
35	Shaylee Dunavin (USA)	1st	2,700	26,100	16,340	45,14 (36)	95.415
35	Shaylee Dunavin (USA)	2nd	14,000	21,300	14,975	50,275 (41)	95.415
36	Samantha Sendel (CAN)	1st	2,700	24,600	16,650	43,95 (54)	95.385
36	Samantha Sendel (CAN)	2nd	14,800	21,300	15,335	51,435 (29)	95.385
37	Claire Arthur (AUS)	1st	2,400	26,400	16,075	44,875 (42)	95.325
37	Claire Arthur (AUS)	2nd	13,700	21,900	14,850	50,45 (38)	95.325
38	Sylvie Wirth (SUI)	1st	2,700	26,700	16,645	46,045 (22)	95.090
38	Sylvie Wirth (SUI)	2nd	12,700	21,000	15,345	49,045 (46)	95.090
39	Palina Badyhina (BLR)	1st	2,000	26,700	16,030	44,73 (44)	94.975
39	Palina Badyhina (BLR)	2nd	12,100	23,100	15,045	50,245 (42)	94.975
40	Beatriz Martins (POR)	1st	2,900	24,900	16,365	44,165 (52)	94.950
40	Beatriz Martins (POR)	2nd	13,800	21,600	15,385	50,785 (36)	94.950
41	Clare Johnson (USA)	1st	2,900	25,500	16,165	44,565 (46)	94.935
41	Clare Johnson (USA)	2nd	14,400	21,300	14,670	50,37 (40)	94.935
42	Anna Kornetskaya (RUS)	1st	2,900	26,400	16,935	46,235 (19)	94.625
42	Anna Kornetskaya (RUS)	2nd	11,700	21,600	15,090	48,39 (52)	94.625
43	Camilla Gomes (BRA)	1st	2,700	24,900	16,735	44,335 (50)	94.400
43	Camilla Gomes (BRA)	2nd	13,800	20,700	15,565	50,065 (44)	94.400
44	Katish Hidari Hernandez Recalde (COL)	1st	2,100	25,500	15,830	43,43 (57)	94.305
44	Katish Hidari Hernandez Recalde (COL)	2nd	13,000	22,500	15,375	50,875 (34)	94.305
45	Léa Labrousse (FRA)	1st	3,100	24,600	16,035	43,735 (55)	94.140
45	Léa Labrousse (FRA)	2nd	12,700	22,500	15,205	50,405 (39)	94.140
46	Bo Bet (NED)	1st	2,700	26,100	16,200	45 (41)	93.905
46	Bo Bet (NED)	2nd	12,700	21,300	14,905	48,905 (48)	93.905
47	Pascaline Wiebering (NED)	1st	2,700	25,800	16,000	44,5 (48)	93.495
47	Pascaline Wiebering (NED)	2nd	12,700	21,600	14,695	48,995 (47)	93.495
48	Ingrid Maior (BRA)	1st	2,700	25,200	16,275	44,175 (51)	92.400
48	Ingrid Maior (BRA)	2nd	12,500	20,400	15,325	48,225 (55)	92.400
49	Cristina Sainz (ESP)	1st	2,200	24,600	15,775	42,575 (61)	92.135
49	Cristina Sainz (ESP)	2nd	12,700	21,900	14,960	49,56 (45)	92.135
50	Sviatlana Makshtarova (AZE)	1st	2,900	24,900	17,305	45,105 (37)	91.925
50	Sviatlana Makshtarova (AZE)	2nd	12,200	20,400	14,220	46,82 (60)	91.925
51	Maila Walmod (DEN)	1st	2,900	24,300	15,835	43,035 (58)	91.620
51	Maila Walmod (DEN)	2nd	11,900	21,600	15,085	48,585 (51)	91.620
52	Diana Tuvakbaieva (UKR)	1st	2,700	24,300	15,810	42,81 (60)	91.405
52	Diana Tuvakbaieva (UKR)	2nd	13,100	20,700	14,795	48,595 (50)	91.405
53	Helena Mogensen (DEN)	1st	2,500	24,900	15,580	42,98 (59)	91.250
53	Helena Mogensen (DEN)	2nd	10,700	22,500	15,070	48,27 (54)	91.250
54	Abbie Watts (AUS)	1st	2,300	24,000	16,250	42,55 (62)	90.655
54	Abbie Watts (AUS)	2nd	13,100	19,800	15,205	48,105 (56)	90.655
55	Ana Pacheco (POR)	1st	2,000	24,900	15,475	42,375 (63)	89.730
55	Ana Pacheco (POR)	2nd	10,900	21,600	14,855	47,355 (58)	89.730
56	Lina Sjoeberg (SWE)	1st	2,700	24,000	15,325	42,025 (64)	89.620
56	Lina Sjoeberg (SWE)	2nd	11,800	21,000	14,795	47,595 (57)	89.620
57	Costanza Michelini (ITA)	1st	3,100	21,600	15,470	40,17 (69)	88.905
57	Costanza Michelini (ITA)	2nd	12,200	21,300	15,235	48,735 (49)	88.905
58	Valeriya Yordanova (BUL)	1st	1,400	22,500	15,575	39,475 (71)	87.770
58	Valeriya Yordanova (BUL)	2nd	11,400	21,600	15,295	48,295 (53)	87.770
59	Laura Paris (FRA)	1st	1,700	20,100	13,700	35,4 (75)	86.630
59	Laura Paris (FRA)	2nd	11,500	23,700	16,130	51,23 (31)	86.630
60	Mara Colombo (ARG)	1st	2,000	23,400	15,995	41,395 (68)	86.590
60	Mara Colombo (ARG)	2nd	8,400	21,600	15,195	45,195 (62)	86.590
61	Alida Rojo Mendoza (VEN)	1st	3,000	21,600	15,480	40,08 (70)	86.515
61	Alida Rojo Mendoza (VEN)	2nd	10,700	20,700	15,035	46,435 (61)	86.515
62	Carolayn Lopez Briceno (VEN)	1st	2,700	21,900	14,460	39,06 (72)	83.845
62	Carolayn Lopez Briceno (VEN)	2nd	9,300	21,300	14,185	44,785 (63)	83.845
63	Eva Kierath (AUS)	1st	2,800	23,400	15,790	41,99 (66)	83.620
63	Eva Kierath (AUS)	2nd	12,200	16,800	12,630	41,63 (65)	83.620
64	Marianela Galli (ARG)	1st	2,700	21,000	15,195	38,895 (73)	83.145
64	Marianela Galli (ARG)	2nd	9,700	19,800	14,750	44,25 (64)	83.145
65	Samantha Smith (CAN)	1st	2,900	27,300	16,380	46,58 (14)	69.220
65	Samantha Smith (CAN)	2nd	6,900	9,300	6,440	22,64 (68)	69.220
66	Anna Bakunovytska (UKR)	1st	3,300	25,200	15,935	44,435 (49)	65.030
66	Anna Bakunovytska (UKR)	2nd	5,600	8,700	6,295	20,595 (69)	65.030
67	Ayaallah Farahat (EGY)	1st	1,300	16,500	12,415	30,215 (77)	63.250
67	Ayaallah Farahat (EGY)	2nd	4,400	17,100	11,535	33,035 (66)	63.250
68	Ashrakat Ismail (EGY)	1st	1,500	21,900	14,390	37,79 (74)	63.085
68	Ashrakat Ismail (EGY)	2nd	5,800	11,100	8,395	25,295 (67)	63.085
69	Samantha Chavez (MEX)	1st	2,900	23,700	15,405	42,005 (65)	62.235
69	Samantha Chavez (MEX)	2nd	5,200	9,000	6,030	20,23 (70)	62.235
70	Silvia Saiote (POR)	1st	3,000	26,100	16,705	45,805 (24)	61.970
70	Silvia Saiote (POR)	2nd	4,900	6,300	4,965	16,165 (72)	61.970
71	Oceane Coudert (FRA)	1st	2,100	26,400	16,225	44,725 (45)	60.960
71	Oceane Coudert (FRA)	2nd	4,700	6,600	4,935	16,235 (71)	60.960
72	Sabina Zaitseva (AZE)	1st	2,300	25,500	16,710	44,51 (47)	60.480
72	Sabina Zaitseva (AZE)	2nd	4,200	6,900	4,870	15,97 (73)	60.480
73	Zita Frydrychova (CZE)	1st	3,100	25,800	16,520	45,42 (31)	56.655
73	Zita Frydrychova (CZE)	2nd	3,400	4,500	3,335	11,235 (74)	56.655
74	Tara Fokke (NED)	1st	2,700	26,100	16,565	45,365 (32)	56.120
74	Tara Fokke (NED)	2nd	2,900	4,500	3,355	10,755 (75)	56.120
75	Tamari Kakashvili (GEO)	1st	1,300	2,100	1,615	5,015 (79)	51.930
75	Tamari Kakashvili (GEO)	2nd	10,100	22,200	14,615	46,915 (59)	51.930
76	Daienne Lima (BRA)	1st	2,800	24,300	14,755	41,855 (67)	51.510
76	Daienne Lima (BRA)	2nd	2,700	3,900	3,055	9,655 (76)	51.510
77	Claudia Prat (ESP)	1st	2,700	26,100	16,360	45,16 (35)	50.400
77	Claudia Prat (ESP)	2nd	2,000	1,500	1,740	5,24 (77)	50.400
78	Farah Khalil (EGY)	1st	0,800	18,900	13,095	32,795 (76)	37.455
78	Farah Khalil (EGY)	2nd	1,300	1,800	1,560	4,66 (79)	37.455
79	Mariela Peneva (BUL)	1st	0,000	12,900	7,995	20,895 (78)	26.120
79	Mariela Peneva (BUL)	2nd	1,500	2,100	1,625	5,225 (78)	26.120

=== Synchro ===
Position	Team	D Score	E Score	S Score	Penalty	Total
1st place, gold medalist(s)	China; Zhong Xingping; Li Dan	15.000	17.100	18.200	0.000	50.300
2nd place, silver medalist(s)	Belarus; Tatsiana Piatrenia; Hanna Harchonak	13.100	16.500	17.800	0.000	47.400
3rd place, bronze medalist(s)	Ukraine; Maryna Kyiko; Natalia Moskvina	12.900	15.800	18.600	0.000	47.300
4	Japan; Chisato Doihata; Reina Satake	12.000	16.400	17.600	0.000	46.000
5	United States; Shaylee Dunavin; Dakota Earnest	13.500	14.700	16.200	0.000	44.400
6	Netherlands; Pascaline Wiebering; Bo Bet	11.500	13.500	16.600	0.000	41.600
7	Switzerland; Fanny Chilo; Sylvie Wirth	7.100	7.200	8.400	0.000	22.700
8	Uzbekistan; Ekaterina Khilko; Anna Kasparyan	4.200	4.600	5.400	0.000	14.200

=== Trampoline Team ===
The women's trampoline team final took place on November 18.

Rank	Team	Score
1st place, gold medalist(s)	China	165.235
1st place, gold medalist(s)	He Wenna	55.215
1st place, gold medalist(s)	Li Dan	54.780
1st place, gold medalist(s)	Liu Lingling	55.240
1st place, gold medalist(s)	Zhong Xingping	-
2nd place, silver medalist(s)	Belarus	160.090
2nd place, silver medalist(s)	Maryia Lon	51.720
2nd place, silver medalist(s)	Hanna Harchonak	54.365
2nd place, silver medalist(s)	Tatsiana Piatrenia	54.005
2nd place, silver medalist(s)	Palina Badyhina	-
3rd place, bronze medalist(s)	Russia	159.765
3rd place, bronze medalist(s)	Nadezhda Glebova	53.080
3rd place, bronze medalist(s)	Anna Kornetskaya	52.610
3rd place, bronze medalist(s)	Yana Pavlova	54.075
3rd place, bronze medalist(s)	Victoria Voronina	-
4	Canada	124.710
4	Samantha Sendel	52.875
4	Karen Cockburn	16.220
4	Rosannagh Maclennan	55.615
4	Samantha Smith	-
5	Great Britain	114.475
5	Bryony Page	54.045
5	Pamela Clark	6.230
5	Katherine Driscoll	54.200
5	Amanda Parker	-

=== Double Mini ===
Rank	Gymnast	D Score	E Score	Penalty	Score	Total
1st place, gold medalist(s)	(United States) Erin Jauch	7.200	28.200		35.400	71.100
1st place, gold medalist(s)	(United States) Erin Jauch	7.200	28.500		35.700	71.100
2nd place, silver medalist(s)	(United Kingdom) Jasmin Short	7.600	26.400		34.000	69.800
2nd place, silver medalist(s)	(United Kingdom) Jasmin Short	7.600	28.200		35.800	69.800
3rd place, bronze medalist(s)	(Sweden) Lina Sjoeberg	6.400	27.000		33.400	67.900
3rd place, bronze medalist(s)	(Sweden) Lina Sjoeberg	6.000	28.500		34.500	67.900
4	(United States) Tristan van Natta	6.000	27.600		33.600	67.800
4	(United States) Tristan van Natta	6.000	28.200		34.200	67.800
5	(Portugal) Andreia Robalo	6.400	27.600		34.000	66.500
5	(Portugal) Andreia Robalo	6.400	26.100		32.500	66.500
6	(Russia) Polina Troianova	6.000	26.700		32.700	65.800
6	(Russia) Polina Troianova	6.400	26.700		33.100	65.800
7	(Canada) Danielle Gruber	6.000	26.100		32.100	64.200
7	(Canada) Danielle Gruber	6.000	26.100		32.100	64.200
8	(New Zealand) Bronwyn Dibb	6.800	26.400		33.200	64.100
8	(New Zealand) Bronwyn Dibb	6.000	24.900		30.900	64.100

=== Double Mini Team ===
Rank	Team	Score
1st place, gold medalist(s)	Canada	103.900
1st place, gold medalist(s)	Arden Oh	34.300
1st place, gold medalist(s)	Danielle Gruber	35.300
1st place, gold medalist(s)	Tamara O'Brien	34.300
1st place, gold medalist(s)	Karine Dufour	-
2nd place, silver medalist(s)	Great Britain	103.400
2nd place, silver medalist(s)	Kirsty Way	34.800
2nd place, silver medalist(s)	Sapphire Dallard	34.100
2nd place, silver medalist(s)	Jasmin Short	34.500
3rd place, bronze medalist(s)	United States	103.000
3rd place, bronze medalist(s)	Tristan van Natta	34.900
3rd place, bronze medalist(s)	Paige Howard	34.500
3rd place, bronze medalist(s)	Erin Jauch	33.600
3rd place, bronze medalist(s)	Kristle Lowell	-
4	Australia	102.000
4	Braida Thomas	33.300
4	Emily O'Connor	34.500
4	Christine Hall	34.200
4	Amy Lewis	-
5	Portugal	101.400
5	Joana da Silva Pereira	34.200
5	Ana Robalo	33.600
5	Andreia Robalo	33.600

=== Tumbling ===
Rank	Gymnast	D Score	E Score	Penalty	Score	Total
1st place, gold medalist(s)	(China) Jia Fangfang	7.900	28.200		36.100	71.800
1st place, gold medalist(s)	(China) Jia Fangfang	7.200	28.500		35.700	71.800
2nd place, silver medalist(s)	(United Kingdom) Lucie Colebeck	6.400	27.300		33.700	69.100
2nd place, silver medalist(s)	(United Kingdom) Lucie Colebeck	7.200	28.200		35.400	69.100
3rd place, bronze medalist(s)	(China) Chen Lingxi	6.400	28.200		34.600	67.900
3rd place, bronze medalist(s)	(China) Chen Lingxi	6.300	27.000		33.300	67.900
3rd place, bronze medalist(s)	(Russia) Anna Korobeinikova	7.900	24.900		32.800	67.900
3rd place, bronze medalist(s)	(Russia) Anna Korobeinikova	7.500	27.600		35.100	67.900
5	(United Kingdom) Rachel Davies	6.400	27.300		33.700	67.000
5	(United Kingdom) Rachel Davies	5.100	28.200		33.300	67.000
6	(Belgium) Tachina Peeters	5.500	27.900		33.400	65.700
6	(Belgium) Tachina Peeters	5.900	26.400		32.300	65.700
7	(Canada) Jordan Sugrim	6.300	23.700		30.000	63.700
7	(Canada) Jordan Sugrim	6.700	27.000		33.700	63.700
8	(Russia) Viktoriia Danilenko	5.900	23.400		29.300	58.800
8	(Russia) Viktoriia Danilenko	6.700	22.800		29.500	58.800

=== Tumbling Team ===
Rank	Team	Score
1st place, gold medalist(s)	China	103.500
1st place, gold medalist(s)	Cai Qizi	32.800
1st place, gold medalist(s)	Chen Lingxi	34.000
1st place, gold medalist(s)	Jia Fangfang	36.700
1st place, gold medalist(s)	Yang Yujie	-
2nd place, silver medalist(s)	Great Britain	103.000
2nd place, silver medalist(s)	Taite Yasmin	33.100
2nd place, silver medalist(s)	Colebeck Lucie	34.700
2nd place, silver medalist(s)	Davies Rachel	35.200
2nd place, silver medalist(s)	Long Ashleigh	-
3rd place, bronze medalist(s)	Russia	100.500
3rd place, bronze medalist(s)	Parakhina Natalia	32.800
3rd place, bronze medalist(s)	Danilenko Viktoriia	32.800
3rd place, bronze medalist(s)	Korobeinikova Anna	34.900
3rd place, bronze medalist(s)	Long Ashleigh	-
4	France	96.100
4	Wambote Emilie	31.600
4	Callon Léa	31.600
4	Deloge Marie	32.900
4	Tonnellier Pauline	-
5	United States	93.200
5	Millard Breanne	31.600
5	Stankevich Brown Yuliya	30.600
5	Whaley Kaylah	31.000
