= 2014 Trampoline World Championships =

- Venue: Ocean Center
- Location: Daytona Beach, Florida, United States
- Start date: 7 November
- End date: 9 November

The 30th Trampoline Gymnastics World Championships was held at the Ocean Center in Daytona Beach, Florida, from November 7–9, 2014.

== Medal summary ==
=== Medal table ===
Rank	Nation	Gold	Silver	Bronze	Total
1	China	5	2	0	7
2	Russia	1	1	2	4
3	United States	1	1	1	3
4	Great Britain	1	1	0	2
5	Belarus	0	2	2	4
6	Canada	0	2	0	2
7	Poland	0	0	1	1
7	Portugal	0	0	1	1
Totals (8 entries)		8	9	7	24

=== Results ===
Event	Gold	Silver	Bronze
Men
Individual Trampoline	Tu Xiao (CHN)	Dong Dong (CHN)	Uladzislau Hancharou (BLR)
Synchro	China (CHN); Dong Dong; Tu Xiao	Belarus (BLR); Mikalai Kazak; Uladzislau Hancharou	Poland (POL); Artur Zakrzewski; Tomasz Adamczyk
Double Mini	Mikhail Zalomin (RUS)	Austin White (USA)	Austin Nacey (USA)
Tumbling	Yang Song (CHN)	Alexander Mironov (RUS)	Tagir Murtazaev (RUS)
Women
Individual Trampoline	Liu Lingling (CHN)	Rosannagh MacLennan (CAN)	Hanna Harchonak (BLR)
Synchro	China (CHN); Liu Lingling; Li Meng	Belarus (BLR); Hanna Harchonak; Tatsiana Piatrenia Canada (CAN); Rosannagh MacLennan; Samantha Sendel	None awarded
Double Mini	Erin Jauch (USA)	Jasmin Short (GBR)	Polina Troianova (RUS)
Tumbling	Rachael Letsche (GBR)	Chen Lingxi (CHN)	Raquel Pinto (POR)

== Men's results ==
=== Individual Trampoline ===
Qualification

Rank	Gymnast	Note
1	Lei Gao (CHN)	
2	Dong Dong (CHN)	
3	Tu Xiao (CHN)	
4	Dmitry Ushakov (RUS)	
5	Sergei Azarian (RUS)	
6	Andrey Yudin (RUS)	
7	Masaki Ito (JPN)	
8	Logan Dooley (USA)	
9	Jie Zan (CHN)	
10	Dylan Schmidt (NZL)	
11	Diogo Ganchinho (POR)	
12	Yasuhiro Ueyama (JPN)	
13	Mikhail Melnik (RUS)	
14	Uladzislau Hancharou (BLR)	
15	Martin Gromowski (GER)	
16	Flavio Cannone (ITA)	
17	Pirmammad Aliyev (KAZ)	
18	Nicolas Schori (SUI)	
19	Katsufumi Tasaki (JPN)	
20	Ilya Grishunin (AZE)	
21	Sebastien Martiny (FRA)	
22	Pedro Ribeiro Ferreira (POR)	
23	Romain Legros (FRA)	
24	Aliaksei Shostak (USA)	
25	Tengizi Koshkadze (GEO)	
26	Shaun Swadling (AUS)	
27	Artur Zakrzewski (POL)	
28	Allan Morante (FRA)	
29	Bartlomiej Hes (POL)	
30	Mikalai Kazak (BLR)	
31	Keegan Soehn (CAN)	
32	Mikael Viviani (FRA)	
33	Kyle Soehn (CAN)	
34	Esaul Ceballos Cervera (MEX)	
35	Tomasz Adamczyk (POL)	
36	Carlos Ramirez Pala (BRA)	
37	Oscar Smith (SWE)	
38	Tiago Lopes (POR)	
39	Te Aroha Kierran Tuhi (NZL)	
40	Immanuel Kober (GER)	
41	Yasen Ivanov (BUL)	
42	Naim Ashhab (CZE)	
43	Angel Hernandez Recalde (COL)	
44	Ruslan Aghamirov (AZE)	
45	Jose Alberto Vargas Garcia (MEX)	
46	Gurkan Mutlu (TUR)	
47	Daniel Alejandro Aguilar Briceno (MEX)	
48	Oswaldo Antonio Prieto Angel (MEX)	
49	Adam Sult (CZE)	
50	Blake Gaudry (AUS)	
51	Joris Geens (BEL)	
52	Loic Lenoir (BEL)	
53	Marc Pinol Berlandino (ESP)	
54	Lucas Adorno (ARG)	
55	Marc Torras Gonzalez (ESP)	
56	Apostolos Koutavas (GRE)	
57	Lewis Bartlett (GBR)	
58	Alon Katz (ISR)	
59	Konstantinos Grapsas (GRE)	
60	Maksym Volianskyi (UKR)	
61	Boyd Cathcart (IRL)	
62	Kyrylo Sonn (GER)	
63	Federico Cury (ARG)	
64	Natanael Camara Rodriguez (PUR)	
65	Jack Penny (AUS)	
66	Sergey Artemiev (ISR)	
67	Martin Pelc (CZE)	
68	Tewfik Chikhi (ALG)	
69	Diogo Abreu (POR)	
70	Jonas Nordfors (SWE)	
71	Daniel Praest (DEN)	
72	Daniel Schmidt (GER)	
73	Saeed Qassem (QAT)	
74	Jeffrey Gluckstein (USA)	
75	Mans Aberg (SWE)	
76	Gal Bello (ISR)	
77	Ioannis Toptidis (GRE)	
78	Ran Markovich (ISR)	
79	Ty Swadling (AUS)	
80	Neil Gulati (USA)	
81	Yernur Syzdyk (KAZ)	
82	Giorgi Putkaradze (GEO)	
83	Jimmy Raymond (SUI)	
84	Dmytro Byedyevkin (UKR)	
85	Benjamin Lucky Radebe (RSA)	
86	Oleg Piunov (AZE)	
87	Takahiko Kato (JPN)	
88	Rafael Andrade (BRA)	
89	Sebolai Offering Tlaka (RSA)	
90	Romain Holenweg (SUI)	
91	Christian Andersen (DEN)	
92	Samory Ortiz Cruz (PUR)	
93	Breno De Paula Souza (BRA)	
94	Yauheni Hankovich (BLR)	
95	Juan Carlos Valcarcel Quitian (COL)	
96	Krystof Baumelt (CZE)	
97	Carlos Arturo Paez Buitrago (COL)	
98	Carlos Rodrigues (ANG)	
99	Martin Spatt (AUT)	
100	Jose Epalanga (ANG)	

Final

The men's individual trampoline final was held on November 9.

Rank	Gymnast	D Score	E Score	T Score	Pen.	Total
1st place, gold medalist(s)	(China) Tu Xiao	18.000	26.100	17.775	0.000	61.875
2nd place, silver medalist(s)	(China) Dong Dong	17.800	25.200	17.890	0.000	60.890
3rd place, bronze medalist(s)	(Belarus) Uladzislau Hancharou	17.600	25.500	17.290	0.000	60.390
4	(Japan) Masaki Ito	16.200	24.900	17.590	0.000	59.690
5	(Russia) Dmitry Ushakov	16.500	24.900	17.230	0.000	58.630
6	(Georgia (country)) Tengizi Khoshkadze	16.600	24.300	17.065	0.000	57.965
7	(Australia) Shaun Swadling	15.800	24.000	17.310	0.000	57.110
8	(Japan) Yasuhiro Ueyama	10.700	14.100	10.645	0.000	35.445

=== Synchro ===
The men's synchro event was held on November 8.

Position	Team	D Score	E Score	S Score	Pen.	Total
1st place, gold medalist(s)	China; Dong Dong; Tu Xiao	15.900	17.200	18.600	0.000	51.700
2nd place, silver medalist(s)	Belarus; Mikalai Kazak; Uladzislau Hancharou	15.600	16.400	17.600	0.000	49.600
3rd place, bronze medalist(s)	Poland; Artur Zakrzewski; Tomasz Adamczyk	14.800	14.900	18.800	0.000	49.400
4	Japan; Masaki Ito; Yasuhiro Ueyama	16.600	16.500	16.000	0.000	49.100
5	Kazakhstan; Pirmammad Aliyev; Rafael Fatkhelyanov	13.100	14.600	14.600	0.000	42.300
6	Australia; Shaun Swadling; Ty Swadling	13.400	14.200	13.200	0.000	40.800
7	New Zealand; Dylan Schmidt; Te Aroha Kierran Tuhi	5.100	4.800	5.000	0.000	14.900
8	United States; Jeffrey Gluckstein; Aliaksei Shostak	3.800	3.200	2.800	0.000	9.800

=== Double Mini ===
The men's double mini event was held on November 8.

Position	Gymnast	D Score	E Score	Penalty	Score 1	D Score	E Score	Penalty	Score 2	Total
1st place, gold medalist(s)	(Russia) Mikhail Zalomin	10.800	28.200	0.000	39.000	10.000	29.100	0.000	39.100	78.100
2nd place, silver medalist(s)	(United States) Austin White	8.400	27.900	0.000	36.300	12.400	28.800	0.000	41.200	77.500
3rd place, bronze medalist(s)	(United States) Austin Nacey	9.200	28.500	0.000	37.700	10.100	26.700	0.000	36.800	74.500
4	(Portugal) Andre Lico	8.800	27.600	0.000	36.400	10.300	27.300	0.000	37.600	74.000
5	(Russia) Andrey Gladenkov	9.200	28.200	0.000	37.400	9.200	25.800	0.000	35.000	72.400
6	(Canada) Jonathon Schwaiger	9.200	27.300	0.000	36.500	7.300	27.000	0.000	34.300	70.800
7	(South Africa) Benjamin Lucky Radebe	8.100	26.700	0.000	34.800	2.800	20.100	0.000	22.900	57.700
8	(Portugal) Andre Fernandes	8.700	25.500	0.000	34.200	0.000	0.000	0.000	0.000	34.200

=== Tumbling ===
The men's tumbling event was held on November 9.

Position	Gymnast	D Score	E Score	Penalty	Score 1	D Score	E Score	Penalty	Score 2	Total
1st place, gold medalist(s)	(China) Yang Song	11.300	27.300	0.000	38.600	12.000	28.200	0.000	40.200	78.800
2nd place, silver medalist(s)	(Russia) Alexander Mironov	10.600	27.600	0.000	38.200	11.200	27.600	0.000	38.800	77.000
3rd place, bronze medalist(s)	(Russia) Tagir Murtazaev	10.500	27.600	0.000	38.100	10.800	26.100	0.000	36.900	75.000
4	(China) Meng Wenchao	11.600	27.600	0.000	39.200	8.600	26.700	0.000	35.300	74.500
5	(United States) Austin Nacey	9.400	27.000	0.000	36.400	8.300	27.300	0.000	35.600	72.000
6	(Denmark) Anders Wesch	7.600	24.300	0.000	31.900	9.900	26.100	0.000	36.000	67.900
7	(United States) Alexander Renkert	8.200	24.300	0.000	32.500	7.900	27.300	0.000	35.200	67.700
8	(United Kingdom) Kristof Willerton	6.400	25.200	0.000	31.600	8.800	26.100	0.000	34.900	66.500

== Women's Results ==
=== Individual Trampoline ===
Qualification

Rank	Gymnast	Note
1	Dan Li (CHN)	
2	Rosannagh Maclennan (CAN)	
3	Xingping Zhong (CHN)	
4	Irina Kundius (RUS)	
5	Lingling Liu (CHN)	
6	Hanna Harchonak (BLR)	
7	Bryony Page (GBR)	
8	Tatsiana Piatrenia (BLR)	
9	Katherine Driscoll (GBR)	
10	Yana Pavlova (RUS)	
11	Charlotte Drury (USA)	
12	Nataliia Moskvina (UKR)	
13	Rana Nakano (JPN)	
14	Maryna Kyiko (UKR)	
15	Samantha Smith (CAN)	
16	Ana Rente (POR)	
17	Pamela Clark (GBR)	
18	Megu Uyama (JPN)	
19	Marine Jurbert (FRA)	
20	Anna Bakunovytska (UKR)	
21	Anna Kornetskaya (RUS)	
22	Shaylee Dunavin (USA)	
23	Ayana Yamada (JPN)	
24	Silvia Saiote (POR)	
25	Sylvie Wirth (SUI)	
26	Lila Kasapoglou (GRE)	
27	Giovanna Venetiglio Bastos Matheus (BRA)	
28	Sabina Zaitseva (AZE)	
29	Dafne Carolina Navarro Loza (MEX)	
30	Kirsten Boersma (NED)	
31	Sarah Eckes (GER)	
32	Oceane Coudert (FRA)	
33	Ingrid Maior (BRA)	
34	Beatriz Martins (POR)	
35	Joana Di Carlo Conde Perez (BRA)	
36	Tamari Kakashvili (GEO)	
37	Alejandra Fernandez Lomeli (MEX)	
38	Katerina Solanska (CZE)	
39	Paraskevi Angelousi (GRE)	
40	Clare Johnson (USA)	
41	Valeriya Yordanova (BUL)	
42	Nadeen Wehdan (QAT)	
43	Maryia Lon (BLR)	
44	Gemma Samantha Zamudio Gomez (MEX)	
45	Yanfei Huang (CHN)	
46	Andrea Pinzon Tron (MEX)	
47	Lea Labrousse (FRA)	
48	Amalia Pasoula (GRE)	
49	Leonie Adam (GER)	
50	Nana Gogashvili (GEO)	
51	Claudia Prat Herrero (ESP)	
52	Victoria Voronina (RUS)	
53	Ekaterina Khilko (UZB)	
54	Zita Frydrychova (CZE)	
55	Camilla Gomes (BRA)	
56	Niny Johanna Bulla Garzon (COL)	
57	Ayano Kishi (JPN)	
58	Anna Kasparyan (UZB)	
59	Luisa Maria Mercado Duarte (COL)	

Final

The women's individual trampoline event was held on November 8.

Rank	Gymnast	D Score	E Score	T Score	Pen.	Total
1st place, gold medalist(s)	(China) Liu Lingling	14.400	24.900	16.690	0.000	55.990
2nd place, silver medalist(s)	(Canada) Rosannagh MacLennan	15.600	23.400	16.130	0.000	55.130
3rd place, bronze medalist(s)	(Belarus) Hanna Harchonak	13.100	24.300	16.575	0.000	53.975
4	(United Kingdom) Kat Driscoll	14.400	23.400	15.760	0.000	53.560
5	(Belarus) Tatsiana Piatrenia	14.400	23.400	15.755	0.000	53.555
6	(China) Zhong Xingping	14.400	22.500	15.920	0.000	53.820
7	(Russia) Irina Kundius	14.600	21.600	16.060	0.000	52.560
8	(Canada) Samantha Smith	15.000	21.900	1.745	0.000	52.150

=== Synchro ===
The women's synchro final was held on November 9.

Position	Team	D Score	E Score	S Score	Pen.	Total
1st place, gold medalist(s)	China; Liu Lingling; Li Meng	13.800	16.600	17.400	0.000	47.800
2nd place, silver medalist(s)	Belarus; Tatsiana Piatrenia; Hanna Harchonak	13.100	16.300	17.800	0.000	47.200
2nd place, silver medalist(s)	Canada; Rosie MacLennan; Samantha Sendel	14.900	15.800	17.400	0.000	47.200
4	United States; Shaylee Dunavin; Charlotte Drury	12.300	15.500	18.600	0.000	46.400
5	Japan; Ayano Kishi; Ayana Yamada	12.000	15.600	18.600	0.000	46.200
6	Uzbekistan; Anna Kasparyan; Ekaterina Khliko	12.700	15.400	18.000	0.000	46.100
7	Ukraine; Nataliia Moskvina; Maryna Kyiko	12.900	15.500	17.200	0.000	45.600
8	Russia; Victoria Voronina; Yana Pavlova	8.200	9.200	11.200	0.000	28.600

=== Double Mini ===
The women's double mini event was held on November 9.

Position	Gymnast	D Score	E Score	Penalty	Score 1	D Score	E Score	Penalty	Score 2	Total
1st place, gold medalist(s)	(United States) Erin Jauch	7.200	28.500	0.000	35.700	7.200	28.500	0.000	35.700	71.400
2nd place, silver medalist(s)	(United Kingdom) Jasmin Short	7.200	27.600	0.000	34.800	7.600	27.900	0.000	35.500	70.300
3rd place, bronze medalist(s)	(Russia) Polina Troianova	6.000	27.600	0.000	33.600	6.000	26.400	0.000	32.400	66.000
4	(Portugal) Ana Robalo	6.000	27.900	0.000	33.900	5.200	26.400	0.000	32.400	65.500
5	(Australia) Christine Hall	2.800	19.800	0.000	22.600	2.800	19.800	0.000	22.600	45.200
6	(South Africa) Bianca Zoonekynd	0.000	0.000	0.000	0.000	8.000	26.700	0.000	34.700	34.700
7	(United States) Tristan Van Natta	0.000	0.000	0.000	0.000	5.600	28.500	0.000	34.100	34.100
8	(Canada) Tamara O'Brien	5.200	27.000	0.000	32.200	0.000	0.000	0.000	0.000	32.200

=== Tumbling ===
The women's individual tumbling final was held on November 8.

Position	Gymnast	D Score	E Score	Penalty	Score 1	D Score	E Score	Penalty	Score 2	Total
1st place, gold medalist(s)	(United Kingdom) Rachael Letsche	7.100	26.700	0.000	33.800	5.500	28.200	0.000	33.700	67.500
2nd place, silver medalist(s)	(China) Chen Lingxi	6.400	27.900	0.000	34.300	6.300	26.700	0.000	33.000	67.300
3rd place, bronze medalist(s)	(Portugal) Raquel Pinto	6.400	27.600	0.000	33.100	6.300	27.900	0.000	33.000	66.100
4	(Portugal) Beatriz Cabrita Botelho	6.000	26.700	0.000	32.700	5.000	27,900	0.000	32.900	65.600
5	(Russia) Victoria Danilenko	7.900	24.300	0.000	32.200	6.200	24.900	0.000	31.100	63.300
6	(Russia) Anna Korobeinikova	6.200	24.300	0.000	30.500	6.300	25.500	0.000	31.800	62.300
7	(China) Jia Fangfang	6.400	28.500	0.000	34.900	4.100	21.900	0.000	26.000	60.900
8	(United Kingdom) Lucie Coleback	6.600	24.300	0.000	30.900	3.900	25.200	0.000	29.100	60.000
