= Gymnastics at the 2018 Asian Games – Men's trampoline =

Men's individual at the 2018 Asian Games
- Venue: Jakarta International Expo
- Date: 30 August 2018
- Competitors: 10 from 6 nations

Medalists
gold medal	Dong Dong	China
silver medal	Gao Lei	China
bronze medal	Pirmammad Aliyev	Kazakhstan

The men's trampoline competition at the 2018 Asian Games took place on 30 August 2018 at the Jakarta International Expo Hall D2.

== Schedule ==
All times are Western Indonesia Time (UTC+07:00)

Date	Time	Event
Thursday, 30 August 2018	13:00	Qualification
Thursday, 30 August 2018	16:00	Final

== Results ==
=== Qualification ===
Rank	Athlete	Routine 1	Routine 2	Total
1	Dong Dong (CHN)	50.790	58.555	109.345
2	Gao Lei (CHN)	51.775	57.365	109.140
3	Ryosuke Sakai (JPN)	49.820	57.495	107.315
4	Yasuhiro Ueyama (JPN)	49.825	57.485	107.310
5	Pirmammad Aliyev (KAZ)	49.960	53.510	103.470
6	Kim Yun-song (PRK)	47.670	52.895	100.565
7	Samirbek Usmonov (UZB)	46.800	50.805	97.605
8	Amiran Babayan (UZB)	45.030	41.140	86.170
9	Yudha Tri Aditya (INA)	40.545	21.155	61.700
10	Sindhu Aji Kurnia (INA)	38.720	9.710	48.430

=== Final ===
Rank	Athlete	Score
1st place, gold medalist(s)	Dong Dong (CHN)	59.925
2nd place, silver medalist(s)	Gao Lei (CHN)	59.220
3rd place, bronze medalist(s)	Pirmammad Aliyev (KAZ)	57.460
4	Ryosuke Sakai (JPN)	57.265
5	Yasuhiro Ueyama (JPN)	56.760
6	Kim Yun-song (PRK)	55.850
7	Samirbek Usmonov (UZB)	53.330
8	Amiran Babayan (UZB)	45.230
