= Douglas Armstrong =

Douglas Armstrong may refer to:

- Douglas Armstrong (politician) (born 1941/2), city councillor on the Auckland City Council, New Zealand for the Citizens & Ratepayers ticket
- Douglas B. Armstrong (1888–1969), British philatelist
- Douglas Armstrong (gymnast) (born 1996), Canadian trampolinist

== See also ==
- Doug Armstrong (disambiguation)
