= Gymnastics at the 2016 Summer Olympics – Men's trampoline =

Men's trampoline at the Games of the XXXI Olympiad
- Venue: HSBC Arena
- Date: 13 August 2016
- Competitors: 16 from 13 nations
- Winning score: 61.745

Medalists
1st place, gold medalist(s)		Uladzislau Hancharou	Belarus
2nd place, silver medalist(s)		Dong Dong	China
3rd place, bronze medalist(s)		Gao Lei	China

The Men's trampoline competition at the 2016 Summer Olympics was held at the HSBC Arena.

The medals were presented by Barbara Kendall IOC member, New Zealand and Horst Kunze, FIG Trampoline Technical Committee President.

== Competition format ==
The competition had rounds: qualification and final. In qualification, the gymnasts performed two routines: compulsory and voluntary. Scores for the two were summed, and the best eight gymnasts moved on to the final. The final consisted of a single routine, with qualification scores not carrying over.

== Qualification ==
The gymnasts who ranked top eight qualified for final round. In case of there were more than two gymnasts in same NOC, the last ranked among them would not qualify to final round. The next best ranked gymnast would qualify instead.

Rank	Name	Compulsory	Voluntary	Penalty	Total	Notes
1	Gao Lei (CHN)	52.160	60.375		112.535	Q
2	Uladzislau Hancharou (BLR)	50.630	60.460		111.090	Q
3	Dong Dong (CHN)	49.280	60.770		110.050	Q
4	Dmitry Ushakov (RUS)	49.340	59.840		109.180	Q
5	Andrey Yudin (RUS)	49.645	59.080		108.725	Q
6	Masaki Ito (JPN)	49.140	59.325		108.465	Q
7	Ginga Munetomo (JPN)	49.140	59.050		108.190	Q
8	Dylan Schmidt (NZL)	48.300	59.360		107.660	Q
9	Nathan Bailey (GBR)	47.795	59.000		106.795	R1
10	Sébastien Martiny (FRA)	49.015	57.215		106.230	R2
11	Logan Dooley (USA)	47.885	58.170		106.055	
12	Pirmammad Aliyev (KAZ)	48.375	57.515		105.890	
13	Blake Gaudry (AUS)	49.525	55.925		105.450	
14	Jason Burnett (CAN)	49.320	54.395		103.715	
15	Rafael Andrade (BRA)	47.035	29.110		76.145	
16	Diogo Abreu (POR)	49.615	6.240		55.855	

== Final ==
Rank	Name	Difficulty	Execution	Flight	Penalty	Total
1st place, gold medalist(s)	Uladzislau Hancharou (BLR)	17.300	26.400	18.045		61.745
2nd place, silver medalist(s)	Dong Dong (CHN)	17.800	25.200	17.535		60.535
3rd place, bronze medalist(s)	Gao Lei (CHN)	18.400	23.700	18.075		60.175
4	Ginga Munetomo (JPN)	18.000	23.700	17.835		59.535
5	Dmitrii Ushakov (RUS)	16.700	25.500	17.325		59.525
6	Masaki Ito (JPN)	17.200	24.000	17.600		58.800
7	Dylan Schmidt (NZL)	17.100	22.500	17.540		57.140
8	Andrey Yudin (RUS)	2.200	2.700	1.915		6.815
