= Léa Labrousse =

French trampoline gymnast

- Born: 6 April 1997 (age 29) Beaumont, Puy-de-Dôme
- Height: 155 cm (5 ft 1 in)

Gymnastics career
- Discipline: Trampoline gymnastics
- Country represented: France; (2014 - present)
- Club: Levallois Sporting Club
- Gym: INSEP
- Head coaches: Guillaume Bourgeon, Tristan Lajarrige
Medal record
Women's trampoline gymnastics
Representing France
World Championships
Silver medal – second place	2022 Sofia	Synchro
Silver medal – second place	2023 Birmingham	Individual team
European Games
Gold medal – first place	2019 Minsk	Individual
European Championships
Gold medal – first place	2016 Valladolid	Synchro
Gold medal – first place	2024 Guimarães	Individual team
Silver medal – second place	2018 Baku	Individual team
Silver medal – second place	2021 Sochi	Individual
Silver medal – second place	2024 Guimarães	Synchro
Bronze medal – third place	2021 Sochi	Individual team
Bronze medal – third place	2022 Rimini	Individual

Léa Labrousse (born 6 April 1997) is a French trampolinist. She is a two-time World silver medalist and the 2019 European Games individual champion. She became the first French woman to win gold at the European Trampoline Championships with her synchro partner Marine Jurbert. She represented France at the 2020 Summer Olympics and will compete at the 2024 Summer Olympics.

== Early life ==
Labrousse was born in 1997 in Beaumont, Puy-de-Dôme. She began artistic gymnastics when she was five years old, and she switched to trampoline when she was eight. She moved to Rennes at the end of middle school.

== Career ==
Labrousse won the French junior national titles in 2007, 2008, 2011, and 2012, and she won a silver medal at the 2012 European Junior Championships. She represented France at the 2014 Summer Youth Olympics and finished fourth in the individual event. She injured her knee at the 2014 World Championships and was out of competition for five months. She won her first senior national title in 2015.

=== 2015–16 ===
Labrousse and Marine Jurbert won the silver medal in the synchronized event at the 2015 Loulé World Cup. At the 2016 European Championships, she won the gold in Marine Jurbert. This was the first time France won a European title in women's trampoline. She then won a silver medal in the individual event at the 2016 Shanghai World Cup behind China's Li Dan. She won a bronze medal with Jurbert at the 2016 Coimbra World Cup.

=== 2017–18 ===
At the 2017 Valladolid World Cup, Labrousse and Jurbert won a bronze medal in the synchro competition. She won a silver medal with the women's trampoline team at the 2018 European Championships. During the synchro competition, she landed on the frame of the trampoline and injured her foot. She was back in competition by October, winning a bronze medal with Jurbert at the Loulé World Cup.

=== 2019 ===
Labrousse won the individual gold medal at the 2019 European Games. She won a bronze medal with Jurbert at the Khabarovsk World Cup. After the competition at the 2019 World Championships, she was presented with the VTB Prize for accuracy and elegance.

=== 2021 ===
At the 2021 European Championships in Sochi, Labrousse won a team bronze medal with Marine Jurbert, Marine Prieur, and Anaïs Breche. She also won the individual silver medal behind Russia's Iana Lebedeva, which was the best European result in the history of French women's individual trampoline. She won gold medals with Jurbert at the Brescia and Anadia World Cups.

Labrousse competed at the Olympic Games in Tokyo and finished 12th in the qualification round after making a mistake on her first routine. She finished fourth in the individual event at the 2021 World Championships.

=== 2022–23 ===
Labrousse won the individual bronze medal at the 2022 European Championships in Rimini. Then at the Arosa World Cup, she won a bronze medal with synchro partner Anaïs Breche. She won a silver medal in synchro with Marine Jurbert at the 2022 World Championships in Sofia. At the 2023 World Championships in Birmingham, Labrousse won the silver medal in the team event with Laura Paris, Cléa Brousse, and Anaïs Brèche.

=== 2024 ===
At the 2024 European Championships in Guimarães, Labrousse won the team gold medal with Laura Paris, Cléa Brousse, and Marine Prieur. This was the first European gold medal for France in women's team trampoline. She also won the silver medal in synchro with Marine Jurbert and as an individual.

Labrousse was selected to represent France at the 2024 Summer Olympics.
