= Uladzislau Hancharou =

Belarusian trampoline gymnast

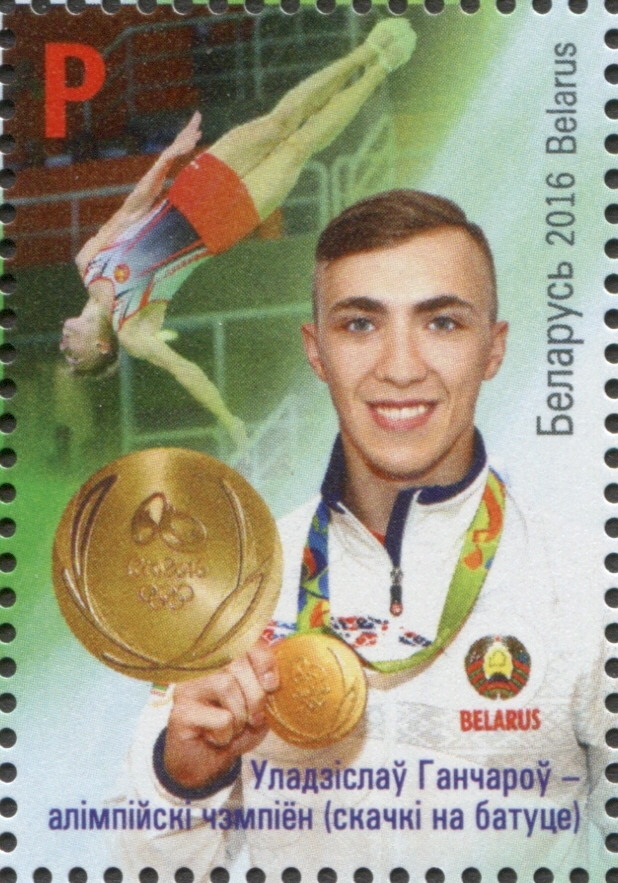
- Hancharou on a 2016 stamp

Personal information
- Full name: Uladzislau Alehavich Hancharou
- Alternative name: Vladislav Olegovich Goncharov
- Born: 2 December 1995 (age 30) Vitebsk, Belarus
- Height: 173 cm (5 ft 8 in)

Gymnastics career
- Discipline: Trampoline gymnastics
- Country represented: Belarus
- Head coach: Olga Vlasova
Medal record
Men's trampoline gymnastics
Representing Belarus
Olympic Games
Gold medal – first place	2016 Rio de Janeiro	Individual
World Championships
Gold medal – first place	2017 Sofia	Synchro
Gold medal – first place	2018 St. Petersburg	Synchro
Gold medal – first place	2019 Tokyo	Team
Silver medal – second place	2014 Daytona Beach	Synchro
Silver medal – second place	2015 Odense	Individual
Silver medal – second place	2015 Odense	Synchro
Silver medal – second place	2019 Tokyo	Synchro
Bronze medal – third place	2014 Daytona Beach	Individual
Bronze medal – third place	2015 Odense	Team
European Games
Gold medal – first place	2019 Minsk	Individual
Silver medal – second place	2015 Baku	Individual
Silver medal – second place	2015 Baku	Synchro
European Championships
Gold medal – first place	2014 Guimarães	Individual
Gold medal – first place	2016 Valladaloid	Individual
Gold medal – first place	2016 Valladaloid	Synchro
Gold medal – first place	2018 Baku	Synchro
Gold medal – first place	2021 Sochi	Synchro
Gold medal – first place	2021 Sochi	Team
Gold medal – first place	2018 Baku	Team
Silver medal – second place	2016 Valladaloid	Team
Silver medal – second place	2021 Sochi	Individual
Bronze medal – third place	2014 Guimarães	Team

Uladzislau Alehavich Hancharou (Belarusian: Уладзіслаў Алегавіч Ганчароў; born 2 December 1995) is a Belarusian trampoline gymnast. He is the 2016 Olympic champion in individual trampoline. He is a two-time World champion in synchronized trampoline with partner Aleh Rabtsau. Additionally, at the European level, he is a two-time individual champion and a two-time synchro champion. He also competed at the 2020 Summer Olympics and finished fourth in the individual event.

== Career ==
Hancharou started training trampoline gymnastics at the age of six.

=== 2013–2015 ===
Hancharou competed at his first World Championships in 2013 but fell in the individual final and finished eighth. At the 2014 World Championships in Daytona Beach, United States, he finished 14th in the qualification round for the individual event. Then, in the final, he added two points to his difficulty score to win the bronze medal behind Tu Xiao and Dong Dong. He then won a silver medal alongside Mikalai Kazak in the synchro competition, finishing once again behind Tu and Dong.

Hancharou won the individual silver medal at the 2015 European Games behind Russia's Dmitry Ushakov. He also won a silver medal in the synchro event alongside Mikalai Kazak. At the 2015 World Championships, he won the silver medal in the individual event behind Gao Lei. He won another silver medal in the synchro event with Kazak. Additionally, Belarus won a bronze medal in the team event.

=== 2016 ===
Despite already being qualified for the Olympic Games, Hancharou competed at the 2016 Olympic Test Event and won the gold medal. He then represented Belarus at the 2016 Summer Olympics and qualified for the individual final in second place, behind Gao Lei. In the final, he won the gold medal ahead of Dong Dong and Gao thanks to his high execution score. In doing so, he ended China's nine-year Olympic and World gold medal-winning streak in men's trampoline and became Belarus's first Olympic champion in trampoline. He was Belarus's first and only gold medalist of the Games.

=== 2017–2019 ===
At the 2017 World Championships, Hancharou qualified for the individual final in fifth place after hitting the side of the trampoline. He hit the trampoline bed again in the final and did not win an individual medal. He then competed in the synchro event with Aleh Rabtsau, and they won the gold medal.

Hancharou won the gold medal in the individual event at the 2018 Arosa World Cup. Hancharou and Rabtsau successfully defended their synchro title at the 2018 World Championships. He then finished fourth in the individual event.

Hancharou won the individual event at the 2019 Baku World Cup. He then lost to Russian Mikhail Melnik at the Minsk World Cup. He defeated Melnik in the individual event at the 2019 European Games. He failed to advance to the individual final at the 2019 World Championships due to mistakes in the semi-finals. He did win a silver medal in the synchro event alongside Rabtsau, and Belarus won a gold medal in the team event.

=== 2021 ===
At the 2021 European Championships in Sochi, Russia, he won the gold medal in the team event alongside Ivan Litvinovich, Aleh Rabtsau, and Aliaksei Dudarau. Additionally, Rabtsau and Hancharou won gold in the synchro event, and Hancharou won the silver medal in the individual event, behind Rabtsau. He was the selected to compete at the postponed-2020 Summer Olympics. He qualified for the individual final in second place, behind teammate Litvinovich. He then finished fourth in the final by 0.110 points behind bronze medalist Dylan Schmidt.

== Personal life ==
Hancharou is married to Hanna Hancharova, another Belarusian trampoline gymnast who has won World and European Games medals. They have twin daughters, Miloslava and Olivia, who were born in October 2020.
