= Rachael Letsche =

British trampoline gymnast (born 1991)

Personal information
- Born: November 1, 1991 (age 34) United Kingdom

Sport
- Sport: Trampolining

Rachael Letsche (born 1 November 1991) is a British former tumbling trampolinist, representing her nation at international competitions. She won medals at world championships, including at the 2014 Trampoline World Championships, where she won the gold medal in the individual tumbling event. She had previously competed in 2009 and 2011. Letsche retired from competitive sports in November 2014.

== Personal life ==
Letsche is from Sutton Leach in St Helens on Merseyside. Letsche attended Sutton High Sports College.

== Awards ==
World Championships
Year	Place	Medal	Type
2013	Sofia (Bulgaria)	Bronze	Tumbling Team
2014	Daytona Beach (USA)	Gold	Tumbling
World Games
Year	Place	Medal	Type
2013	Cali (Colombia)	Silver	Women's tumbling
