= Erin Jauch =

American trampoline gymnast

- Born: August 24, 1994 (age 32)

Gymnastics career
- Discipline: Trampoline gymnastics
- Country represented: United States
- Club: Fox Valley Trampoline and Tumbling
- Head coach: Stacy Jauch
Medal record
Women's trampoline gymnastics
Representing the United States
World Championships
Gold medal – first place	2015 Odense	Double Mini
Gold medal – first place	2014 Daytona Beach	Double Mini
Gold medal – first place	2013 Sofia	Double Mini Team
Bronze medal – third place	2015 Odense	Double Mini Team
Bronze medal – third place	2011 Birmingham	Double Mini Team
Pan American Championships
Gold medal – first place	2014 Mississauga	Double Mini
Gold medal – first place	2014 Mississauga	Double Mini Team

Erin Jauch (born August 24, 1994) is an American trampoline gymnast. Jauch competed in the 2014 World Trampoline and Tumbling Championships at the Ocean Center in Daytona Beach and won the women's double-mini gold medal. Erin retired from the sport in 2016.

== USTA and AAU career ==
Jauch also competed at competitions for both the United States Tumbling and Trampoline Association and the Amateur Athletic Union for trampoline and tumbling. Jauch was a national team member in both organizations. At the age of 16, Jauch won the Joe Ferrell award at the AAU junior olympics. The award is to recognize the athletic ability and sportsmanship of an athlete representing each official sport at the AAU Junior Olympic Games.

== Accomplishments ==
=== National ===
- 2015 USA Gymnastics Championships, Greensboro, N.C. - 1st-DM
- 2014 USA Gymnastics Championships, Louisville, Ky. - 1st-DM
- 2014 U.S. Elite Challenge, Spokane, Wash. - 1st-DM
- 2014 Kalon Ludvigson Invitational, Salt Lake City, Utah – 1st-DM
- 2013 Stars & Stripes Cup, Daytona Beach, Fla. - 2nd-DM
- 2013 U.S. T&T Championships, Kansas City, Mo. - 4th-DM
- 2013 U.S. Elite Challenge, Frisco, Texas – 1st-DM
- 2012 U.S. Elite Championships, Long Beach, Calif. - 1st-DM
- 2012 Stars & Stripes Cup, Cleveland, Ohio – 1st-DM
- 2011 U.S. Elite Championships, San Antonio, Texas – 1st-DM
- 2011 U.S. Elite Challenge, Fort Worth, Texas – 3rd-DM
- 2011 Winter Classic, Houston, Texas – 1st-DM
- 2010 Visa Championships, Hartford, Conn. - 1st-DM (Jr. Div.)

=== International ===
- 2015 World Trampoline and Tumbling Championships Denmark - 1st Double Mini Individual
- 2014 World Trampoline and Tumbling Championships – 1st-Double Mini
- 2014 Pan American Championships, Toronto, Canada – 1st-Double Mini (Team), Double Mini
- 2014 Stars & Stripes Cup, Daytona Beach, Fla. - 2nd-Double Mini
- 2013 World Championships, Sofia, Bulgaria – 1st-Double Mini (Team);

 4th Individual -Double Mini

- 2011 World Championships, Birmingham, England – 3rd-Double Mini (Team)
- 2010 World Age Group Competition, Metz, France – 1st-Double Mini (15-16)
