= Gao Lei =

Chinese trampoline gymnast (born 1992)

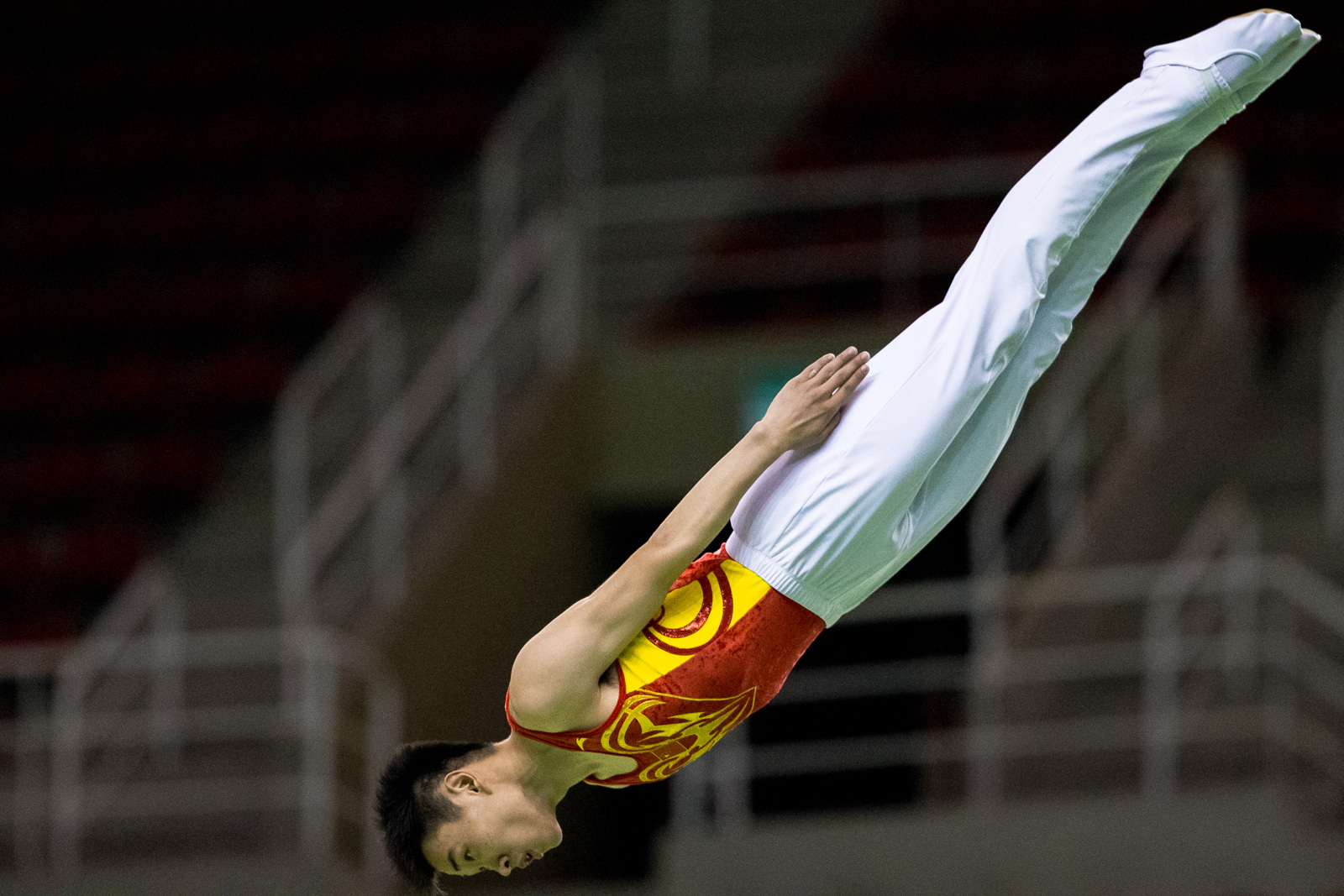
- Gao competing at the 2016 Olympic Test Event

Personal information
- Born: 3 January 1992 (age 34) Shanghai, China
- Height: 170 cm (5 ft 7 in)

Gymnastics career
- Discipline: Trampoline gymnastics
- Country represented: China (2011–2021)
Medal record
Men's trampoline gymnastics
Representing China
Olympic Games
Bronze medal – third place	2016 Rio de Janeiro	Individual
World Championships
Gold medal – first place	2013 Sofia	Team
Gold medal – first place	2015 Odense	Individual
Gold medal – first place	2017 Sofia	Individual
Gold medal – first place	2017 Sofia	Team
Gold medal – first place	2018 St. Petersburg	Individual
Gold medal – first place	2018 St. Petersburg	Team All-around
Gold medal – first place	2019 Tokyo	Individual
Silver medal – second place	2015 Odense	Team
Silver medal – second place	2019 Tokyo	Team
Bronze medal – third place	2019 Tokyo	Team All-around
Asian Games
Silver medal – second place	2018 Jakarta	Individual

Gao Lei (born 3 January 1992) is a Chinese trampoline gymnast. He won four consecutive World titles in the individual event, and he won the bronze medal at the 2016 Summer Olympics. He is also the 2018 Asian Games silver medalist.

== Gymnastics career ==
Gao initially trained in artistic gymnastics but later switched to trampoline.

Gao won the individual gold medal at the 2013 Valladolid World Cup after performing five triple somersaults in a row. At the 2013 World Championships, he won a gold medal in the team event alongside Dong Dong, Tu Xiao, and He Yuxiang. Despite finishing fourth in the individual semi-finals, he was unable to advance into the final due to the two-per-country rule, as he placed behind Dong and Tu. Gao and He did advance into the synchro final, finishing seventh. He finished first in the individual qualification round at the 2014 World Championships, but he was unable to complete his routine in the semifinals and did not advance into the final.

Gao won the individual event at the 2015 Valladolid World Cup with the highest difficulty score of the competition. He then won again at the Mouilleron World Cup by 0.600 points ahead of Dong. At the 2015 World Championships, Gao won the individual event for the first time with a routine that included six triple somersaults. He also helped China win silver in the team event. He finished first in the qualification round at the 2016 Olympic Test Event, but in the final, he landed off the trampoline and finished eighth.

Gao won the silver medal to Dong at the 2016 Brescia World Cup. He represented China at the 2016 Summer Olympics and had the top score in the qualifying round. In the final, he went off-center during his routine and ultimately won the bronze medal behind Uladzislau Hancharou and Dong Dong. Gao defeated Hancharou by over two points at the 2017 Loule World Cup. He then won his second consecutive individual title at the 2017 World Championships, where he also won the team event alongside Dong and Tu.

Gao finished seventh at the 2018 Brescia World Cup due to mistakes in his routine. He then won the gold medal at the Maebashi World Cup and the silver medal at the Loule World Cup behind Hancharou. At the 2018 Asian Games, he won the silver medal in the individual event behind Dong. He went on to beat Dong at the 2018 World Championships. This marked the first time a male trampoline gymnast won three consecutive World titles since Alexander Moskalenko did so in 1994. He also won a gold medal with China in the first-ever all-around team event.

Gao won the gold medal at the 2019 Khabarovsk World Cup by only 0.035 points ahead of Hancharou, and he lost to Hancharou by 0.065 points at the Valladolid World Cup. At the 2019 World Championships, Gao won his fourth consecutive individual title, becoming the first male trampoline gymnast to do so. He also secured an Olympic berth for China. He also won a silver medal in the trampoline team competition with Dong, Tu, and Yan Langyu, and China won the all-around team bronze medal.

Gao represented China at the 2020 Summer Olympics. However, during the qualification round, he was unable to complete his routine after landing a skill on the mat off the trampoline. He thus did not advance into the final despite being considered a favorite to win the gold medal. He chose not to compete at the 2021 World Championships, ending his streak of consecutive World titles.
