= Charlotte Drury =

American trampoline gymnast

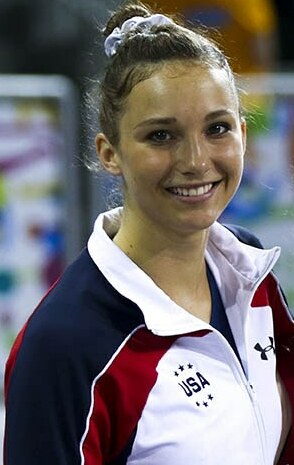
- Drury at the 2015 Pan American Games

Personal information
- Full name: Charlotte Frances Drury
- Nicknames: Char, Charlie, Charizard
- Born: June 4, 1996 (age 30) Laguna Beach, California
- Height: 5 ft 8 in (173 cm)

Gymnastics career
- Discipline: Trampoline gymnastics
- Country represented: United States
- Gym: World Elite Gymnastics (WEG)
- Head coaches: Logan Dooley (2016-2021); Robert Null
- Assistant coach: Peter Dodd
- Retired: July 30, 2021
Medal record
Women's trampoline gymnastics
Representing United States
Pan American Championships
Bronze medal – third place	2014 Mississauga	Synchro
FIG World Cup
Gold medal – first place	2014 Minsk	Trampoline
Bronze medal – third place	2014 Minsk	Synchro

Charlotte Frances Drury (born June 4, 1996) is an American trampoline gymnast. At the 2014 Minsk World Cup, she finished at the top of the podium in the individual event, becoming the first American woman to win a gold medal in trampoline at a World Cup. That same year, she was crowned national champion at the USA Gymnastics Championships. She was a member of the US Trampoline and Tumbling National Team from 2011 to 2021 and was an alternate at the 2020 Summer Olympics games in Tokyo.

== Early life ==
Drury was born in Laguna Beach, California, to Michael and Ann Drury. She has three siblings: an older brother, James; an older sister, Emma; and a younger sister, Olivia. She graduated from Dana Hills High School in Dana Point, California in 2014 and attended Saddleback Community College in Mission Viejo, California studying International Relations with a focus on Political Science. Charlotte transferred to University of California, Irvine and graduated in 2021.

== Early gymnastics career ==
Drury began artistic gymnastics at age three. When she was around five years old, she started practicing at the National Gymnastics Training Center in nearby Aliso Viejo, California, where she first met fellow aspiring gymnasts McKayla Maroney and Kyla Ross. Together they worked their way up the levels, eventually completing level 10 at Gym-Max Gymnastics in Costa Mesa, California.

However, when it came time to commit to continuing at the elite level, she soon realized her enthusiasm for artistic gymnastics had waned and she no longer had the passion to push herself anymore. Still needing an outlet for her energy, she was encouraged to find something else to stay busy and tried a trampoline class. "That first time it was like ‘this is where I’m supposed to be. This is home.’" Drury said.

=== 2010 ===
She began training at Team OC Gymnastics in Costa Mesa, California and within her first year was competing at level 9. In June 2010, she participated in the Junior Olympic National Championships in Virginia Beach, Virginia, where she won her age group in the double mini event with a total score of 63.500 and finished seventh in the individual event with a total score of 53.500.

=== 2011 ===
Moving gyms yet again to World Elite Gymnastics in Rancho Santa Margarita, California, Drury began her elite career in March at the Winter Classic in Houston, Texas. She finished eighth in the individual event with a total score of 28.975 and fifth in the double mini event with a total score of 61.700.

In April, Drury was in Fort Worth, Texas for the US Elite Challenge. Competing for the first time in the synchronized event, she placed first with partner Deana Parris with a combined score of 121.400. She also placed third in the individual event with a total score of 49.110 and finished fifteenth in the double mini event with a total score of 32.100.

In June, Drury was in Europe where she claimed her first title outside the United States. Competing at the 28th International Frivolten Cup in Herrljunga, Sweden, she won the double mini event with a total score of 63.900. She also finished eighteenth in the individual event with a total score of 64.550.

In July, Drury competed at the US T&T Championships in San Antonio, Texas. She finished twenty-fifth in the individual event with a total score of 65.200, fourth in the synchronized event alongside Parris with a combined score of 99.200 and third in the double mini event with a total score of 63.700.

=== 2012 ===
In February, Drury added to her double mini titles by winning the event at the Winter Classic in St. Petersburg, Florida with a total score of 129.300. She also finished seventh in the individual event with a total score of 41.490.

In March, she competed at the US Elite Challenge in Tulsa, Oklahoma, placing second in both the individual and double mini events with total scores of 47.990 and 128.900 respectively. In the synchronized event she finished fourth with new partner Maggie Gallagher with a combined score of 113.100.

In May, Drury was in Cleveland, Ohio for the Stars and Stripes Cup. Competing in all three events, she finished seventh in individual with a total score of 38.065 and fifth in double mini with a total score of 119.700. Paired again with Gallagher, they finished sixth with a combined score of 106.700 in synchronized.

In July, Drury competed at the US T&T Championships in Long Beach, California. This time Drury and Gallagher finished fourth in the synchronized event with a combined score of 114.700, while in the individual event she finished nineteenth with a total score of 47.515.

Loulé, Portugal in September was the setting for Drury's last competition of the year. At the 7th International Loulé Cup, she won the individual event with a total score of 138.690.

== Senior gymnastics career ==
=== 2013 ===
In May, Drury competed at the US Elite Challenge in Frisco, Texas. Another partner change saw her winning the synchronized event with Texas native Shaylee Dunavin with a combined score of 77.700. She also placed second in the individual event with a total score of 147.948.

In July, Drury matched her performance from May by placing first and second in the synchronized and individual events respectively, at the US T&T Championships in Kansas City, Missouri. Her scores were 121.000 in synchronized and 144.000 in individual. At the end of the month she was off to Cali, Colombia for the World Games. However, after a routine examination by the International Federation of Gymnastics, the venue was deemed not meeting minimum safety requirements and therefore USA Gymnastics decided its athletes should not compete.

In August, Drury was in Daytona Beach, Florida to take part in the Stars and Stripes Cup. Competing only in the individual event, she placed second with a total score of 184.485.

In November, Drury participated in her first World Championships in Sofia, Bulgaria where she and Dunavin qualified for the synchronized finals in third-place. During their final routine, Dunavin traveled after the first skill and the routine was interrupted, leaving them in seventh-place with a combined score of 9.300. In the individual event Drury reached the semi-finals with a total score of 52.535, garnering her a twelfth-place finish.

=== 2014 ===
In May, Drury returned to the Stars and Stripes Cup in Daytona Beach, Florida. She won both the individual and synchronized events, again partnered with Dunavin. Their combined score was 41.900, while Drury herself netted a total score of 52.670 in the individual event.

In June, Drury competed at the US Elite Challenge in Spokane, Washington. This time jumping with Hayley Butcher, they won the synchronized event with a combined score of 94.000. Butcher went on to win the individual event, while Drury placed second with a total score of 137.690. At the end of the month Drury competed internationally at the 48th Nissen Cup in Arosa, Switzerland where she finished fourteenth in the preliminary round with a total score of 96.160.

In July, Drury was in Louisville, Kentucky for the USA Gymnastics Championships. Reunited with Dunavin, the pair placed second in the synchronized event with a combined score of 118.200, less than a point behind first. Drury claimed the individual national championship with a total score of 201.180, while Dunavin placed second.

In August, Drury represented her country at the Pan American Gymnastics Championships in Toronto, Canada. Competing in the individual event she finished twentieth in the preliminary round with a total score of 57.155. In the synchronized event with Dunavin, they placed third with a combined score of 43.600. Composed of Drury, Dunavin and Clare Johnson, Team USA finished fifth overall with a combined score of 114.290.

Drury's next stop was Belarus for the Minsk World Cup in September. After a preliminary round score of 95.870, Drury qualified for the eight-person finals by less than half a point. Canadian Rosie MacLennan, the reigning World and Olympic champion at the time, was in first with a score of 102.225. Renowned for her clean lines and long time of flight, Drury executed a near flawless performance, catapulting her to the top of the leaderboard and capturing the first women's gold medal for an American trampolinist at a World Cup with a total score of 54.430. She also won bronze with Dunavin in the synchronized event, missing silver by three-tenths of a point with a combined score of 44.400.

The year came to a close in November at the World Championships in Daytona Beach, Florida. Drury made it to the semi-finals in the individual event, finishing thirteenth with a total score of 51.560 and finished just out of the medals with Dunavin in the synchronized event in fourth with a combined score of 46.400.

=== 2015 ===
Drury began her season in April with a first-place performance at the US Elite Challenge in Colorado Springs, Colorado. Her total score of 152.405 in the individual event had her placing ahead of previous Pan Am teammates Johnson and Dunavin.

Greensboro, North Carolina was host to the USA Gymnastics Championships in June, where Drury was defending national champion. Despite competing with an injury, she placed third in the individual event with a total score of 142.815.

Drury traveled to Toronto, Canada in July for the quadrennial Pan American Games. Offering a multitude of events over various disciplines, the Games hosted only the individual event in trampoline, where she finished fifth with a total score of 50.190.

In September, Drury was in Spain for the Valladolid World Cup. She finished the preliminary round of the individual event in eleventh-place with a total score of 97.495. At this event a maximum of two athletes per country were eligible to advance to the final round, leaving Drury just outside of qualifying for the eight-person finals by 0.020.

Another World Cup competition followed in October, in Mouilleron-le-Captif, France. In the individual event Drury finished twenty-fourth in the qualification round with a total score of 97.365. Competing in the synchronized event for the first time all year, Drury joined up with long-time partner Shaylee Dunvavin to finish eighth in the qualification round with a combined score of 80.900. However, only one pair per country was eligible for the eight-team finals, which was taken by teammates Nicole Ahsinger and Clare Johnson, who qualified in fourth-place with a combined score of 83.200.

Drury traveled to Frankfurt, Germany at the end of November for a brief training camp and opportunity to acclimate before arriving in Odense, Denmark for the World Championships. This was the first of two qualifiers for the 2016 Summer Olympics, where the top eight competitors (maximum two gymnasts per National Olympic Committee) would automatically earn their nation a quota place. Having the fifth best score in the optional routine, along with the second highest time of flight, Drury qualified for the individual event semi-finals in ninth-place overall with a total score of 100.825. In the semi-final round, she finished with a total score of 53.730, missing the finals by less than half a point. Her eleventh-place finish secured entry to the Olympic Test Event in April, 2016, where the United States had a second chance to qualify for Rio.

=== 2016 ===
In February, Drury was in Battle Creek, Michigan for the Winter Classic where she won the individual event with a total score of 150.020, including a personal best 15.000 degree of difficulty in her final routine. This was the first of three selection events to determine who would represent their country at the 2016 Summer Olympics, pending a United States qualification at the Olympic Test Event in April. The other two selection events were the US Elite Challenge in May and the USA Gymnastics Championships in June.

In March, Drury was in Baku, Azerbaijan for the AGF Trophy World Cup and finished fourteenth in the qualification round with a total score of 97.500.

April was a very busy month for Drury, starting in Everett, Washington for the 2016 Pacific Rim Gymnastics Championships. After a preliminary round score of 100.730 in the individual event, Drury was sitting in first-place going into the final round. Her performance anchored a USA win in the team event with a total score of 292.085. In the final round Drury was unable to recover from some travel during her routine, leaving her with a score of 46.860. The total score of 147.590 had her finishing fourth.

After a short break, Drury was off to the Karolyi Ranch in Huntsville, Texas for final training preparations before arriving in Rio de Janeiro for the Olympic Test Event. The April 19th event would see the number of available quota places increase to eight (maximum one gymnast per National Olympic Committee) from five when neither of the host country, continental representation nor tripartite invitation exemptions were used. Included in the sixteen-person field were the medalists from the 2015 World Championships, whose results would not be considered for the purpose of qualification.

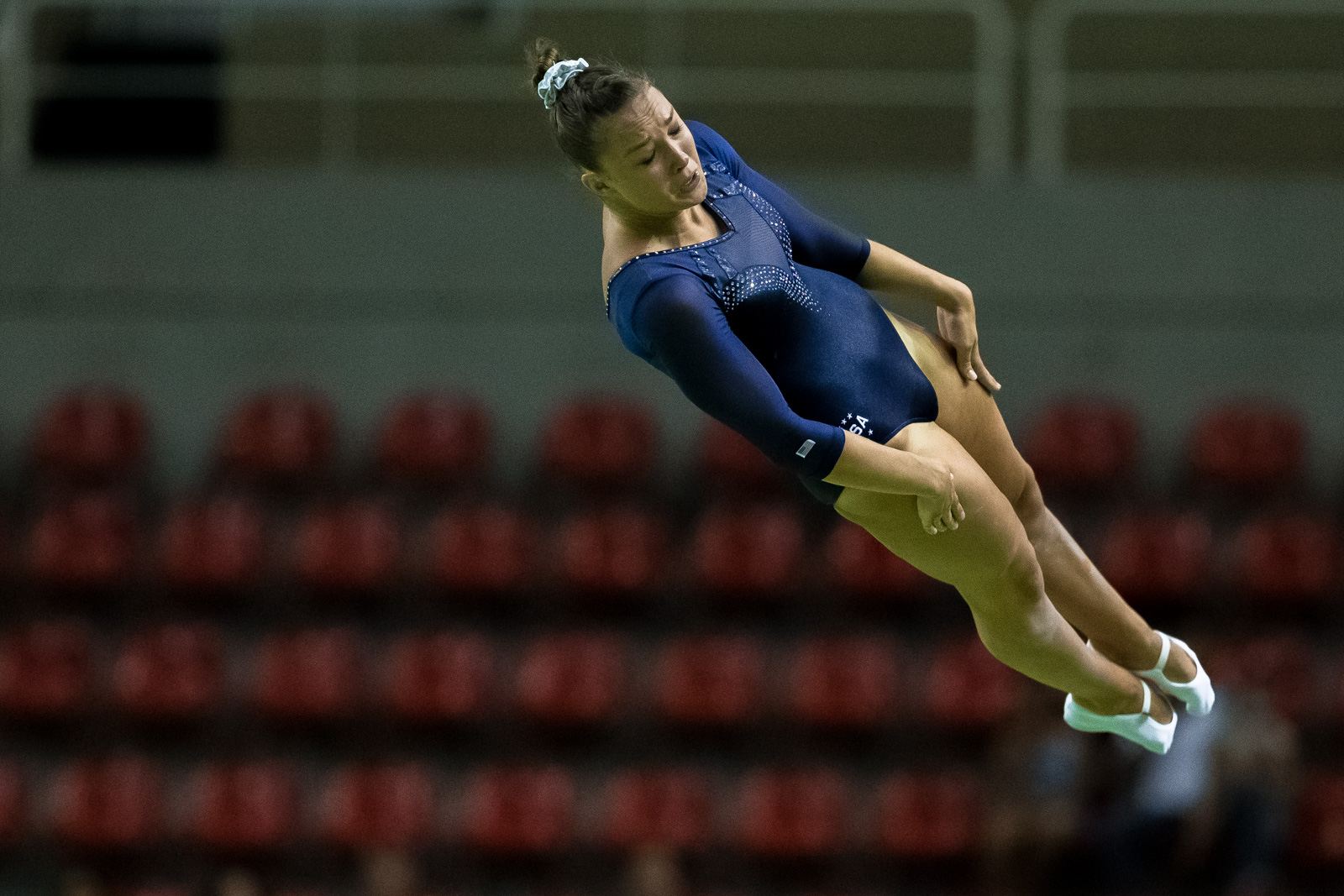
Drury competing at the 2016 Gymnastics Olympic Test Event.

The remaining thirteen competitors would vie for a spot in the top eight by completing two flights in a qualification round. During her compulsory routine, Drury endured some travel that left her in last place with a score of 43.425. Regaining her composure for the second flight, Drury was able to score the third best optional routine among eligible competitors, giving her an eleventh-place finish overall with a total score of 95.915, but more importantly finishing seventh among eligible competitors and guaranteeing a trip to the 2016 Summer Olympics for the United States. “I just kind of let everything out, everything that I was feeling. Let it go and decided to start my second routine with a blank slate,” said Drury. “It's a new turn, a new routine. I had to make it happen. (It was) awesome. Just kind of incredible,” Drury added as she reflected on qualifying the USA to the Games. “You definitely don't realize how much it's weighing on you until it's over and you're in.”

In May, Drury returned to Colorado Springs, Colorado to defend her title at the US Elite Challenge. After a score of 97.690 in the preliminary round of the individual event, including a remarkable 18.020 time of flight during her compulsory routine, she was in first-place heading into the weekend. In the final round Drury had another solid performance, scoring 55.015 on her way to winning her second Olympic selection event with a total score of 152.705.

Straight from Colorado Drury traveled to Shanghai, China for a World Cup competition. In the individual event she was in fifth-place after the compulsory routine with a score of 46.960. While commencing her optional routine Drury twice lost her footing and was unable to register a score, leaving her in thirtieth place.

In June, Drury was set to compete in Providence, Rhode Island at the USA Gymnastics Championships, the final Olympic selection event. Having won the previous two selection events, Drury was considered the favorite to earn herself a return trip to Rio in August. However, during a training session the day before the individual event was to start, Drury sustained an injury to her right foot. Initially believing it to be a bruise, an MRI later confirmed a fracture in her talus bone, forcing her to withdraw from the competition.

=== 2021 ===
Charlotte placed 2nd at US Nationals in 2021 and was selected as an alternate for the 2020 Tokyo Games.

== Competitive history ==
Year	Event	TR	SY	DM
2011	Winter Classic (junior)	8		5
2011	US Elite Challenge (junior)	3rd place, bronze medalist(s)	1st place, gold medalist(s)	15
2011	Frivolten Cup (junior)	18		1st place, gold medalist(s)
2011	US T&T Championships (junior)	25	4	3rd place, bronze medalist(s)
2012	Winter Classic (junior)	7		1st place, gold medalist(s)
2012	US Elite Challenge (junior)	2nd place, silver medalist(s)	4	2nd place, silver medalist(s)
2012	Stars and Stripes Cup (junior)	7	6	5
2012	US T&T Championships (junior)	19	4	
2012	Loulé Cup (junior)	1st place, gold medalist(s)		
2013	US Elite Challenge	2nd place, silver medalist(s)	1st place, gold medalist(s)	
2013	US T&T Championships	2nd place, silver medalist(s)	1st place, gold medalist(s)	
2013	Stars and Stripes Cup	2nd place, silver medalist(s)		
2013	World Championships	12	7	
2014	Stars and Stripes Cup	1st place, gold medalist(s)	1st place, gold medalist(s)	
2014	US Elite Challenge	2nd place, silver medalist(s)	1st place, gold medalist(s)	
2014	Nissen World Cup	14		
2014	USA Gymnastics Championships	1st place, gold medalist(s)	2nd place, silver medalist(s)	
2014	Pan American Gymnastics Championships	20	3rd place, bronze medalist(s)	
2014	Minsk World Cup	1st place, gold medalist(s)	3rd place, bronze medalist(s)	
2014	World Championships	13	4	
2015	US Elite Challenge	1st place, gold medalist(s)		
2015	USA Gymnastics Championships	3rd place, bronze medalist(s)		
2015	Pan American Games	5		
2015	Valladolid World Cup	11		
2015	Mouilleron-le-Captif World Cup	24	8	
2015	World Championships	11		
2016	Winter Classic	1st place, gold medalist(s)		
2016	AGF Trophy World Cup	14		
2016	Pacific Rim Gymnastics Championships	4		
2016	Olympic Test Event	11		
2016	US Elite Challenge	1st place, gold medalist(s)		
2016	Shanghai World Cup	30		
2016	USA Gymnastics Championships	WD		
2018	US Elite Challenge		1st place, gold medalist(s)	
2019	US Elite Challenge	3rd place, bronze medalist(s)		
2020	VIP Classic	1st place, gold medalist(s)		
2020	Baku World Cup	6		
2021	US Elite Challenge	10		
2021	USA Gymnastics Championships	2nd place, silver medalist(s)		
2021	Brescia World Cup	17		

== Personal life ==
She has dual citizenship with Sweden due to her mother's heritage.

About two months before the Trials for the delayed Tokyo 2020 Olympic Games, Charlotte was diagnosed with Type 1 diabetes.

Drury has done commercials for footwear company Skechers and apparel company Vooray.

Her hobbies include photography, writing, hiking, swimming and freediving. She enjoys traveling.

As of 2023, Drury was in a relationship with artistic gymnast Laurie Hernandez, who won gold and silver at the 2016 Olympics.
