= Dylan Schmidt =

New Zealand trampoline gymnast (born 1997)

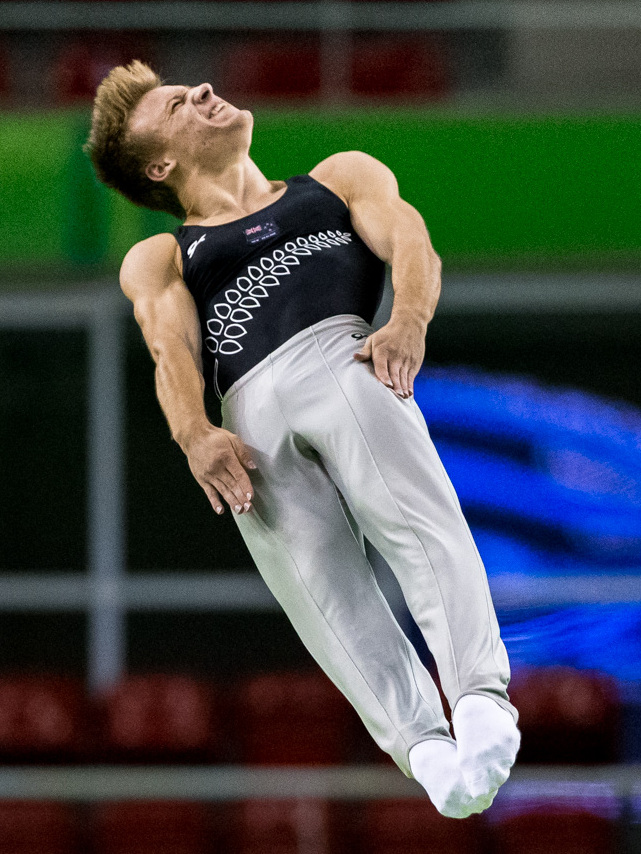
- Schmidt in 2016

Personal information
- Full name: Dylan Matthew Schmidt
- Born: 7 January 1997 (age 29) Southport, Queensland, Australia
- Height: 169 cm (5 ft 7 in)

Gymnastics career
- Discipline: Trampoline gymnastics
- Club: Icon Trampoline Club
- Head coach: Angie Dougal
Medal record
Representing New Zealand
Olympic Games
Bronze medal – third place	2020 Tokyo	Individual
World Championships
Gold medal – first place	2022 Sofia	Individual
Youth Olympic Games
Gold medal – first place	2014 Nanjing	Trampoline

Dylan Matthew Schmidt (born 7 January 1997) is a New Zealand trampoline gymnast. He competed at the 2016 Summer Olympics and finished in seventh place. He was New Zealand's first athlete to compete in trampoline at the Olympic Games. At the 2020 Summer Olympics, he won the bronze medal and became New Zealand's first Olympic medallist in any gymnastics discipline. He became the individual trampoline world champion at the 2022 Trampoline Gymnastics World Championships and is New Zealand's first world champion in men's trampoline. He won the gold medal in the individual event at the 2014 Summer Youth Olympics.

== Early life ==
Schmidt was born on 7 January 1997 in Southport, Queensland. He began trampoline when he was five years old in Te Anau because his older brother and sister were both already training in trampoline. His sister Rachel Schmidt and brother Callum Schmidt have both also competed internationally in trampolining. His mother drove all three siblings from Waihi to Auckland every day for trampoline practice. He was educated at King's College, Auckland.

== Career ==
=== 2014 ===
Schmidt competed at the Pacific Rim Championships, where he finished seventh in the junior individual trampoline event. He then represented New Zealand at the 2014 Summer Youth Olympics and won the gold medal in the individual trampoline event. At the World Championships, he finished tenth in the qualification round for the individual event, and he finished seventh in the synchro final with his partner.

=== 2015–2017 ===
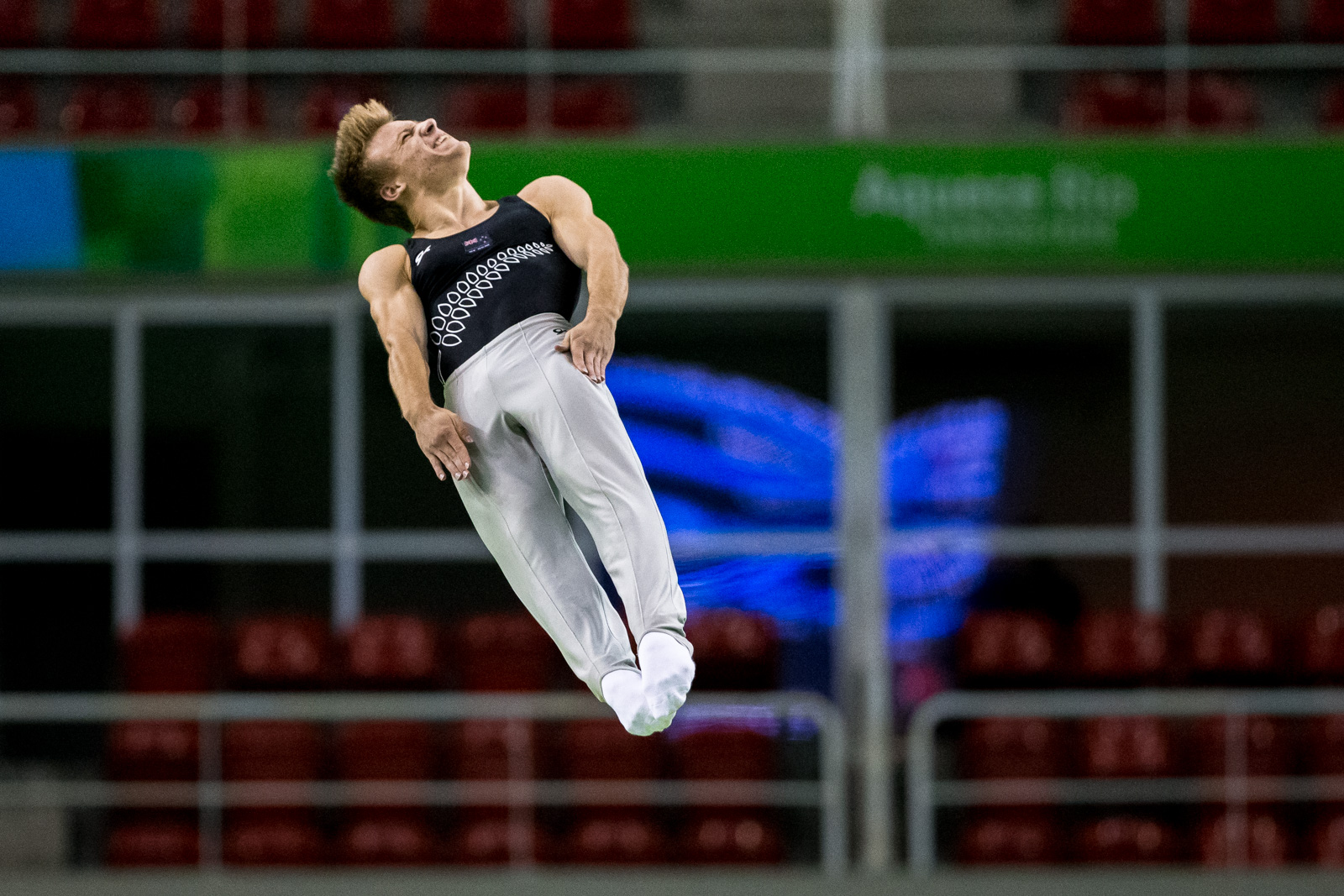
Schmidt competing at the 2016 Olympic Test Event

Schmidt finished tenth in the semifinals at the 2015 World Championships, making him the first reserve for the final. He won the silver medal behind Uladzislau Hancharou at the 2016 Olympic Test Event and qualified for a spot at the 2016 Olympic Games. He became the first trampoline gymnast to represent New Zealand at the Olympics. At the 2016 Summer Olympics, he qualified for the men's trampoline final, in which he finished seventh.

Schmidt struggled with knee and groin injuries throughout the 2017 season. He finished fourth in the individual event at the 2017 Loule World Cup. He then competed at the Sofia World Cup where he won the silver medal behind China's Tu Xiao. He finished twentieth in the semifinals at the 2017 World Championships.

=== 2018–2021 ===
In March 2018, Schmidt injured his anterior cruciate ligament and lateral collateral ligament in training, and he had knee-reconstruction surgery. This injury kept him out of the entire 2018 season. During the warmups at the 2019 World Championships, he tweaked the knee he had surgery on in 2018. He still competed and finished twelfth in the semifinals, initially missing out on qualification for the 2020 Olympic Games. However, he had earned enough points during the 2019–21 Trampoline World Cup series to earn New Zealand an Olympic spot.

When Schmidt was not able to train in the gym due to COVID-19 restrictions in New Zealand, he trained basic skills on a trampoline in his garden in order to stay in shape.

Schmidt was selected to represent New Zealand at the 2020 Summer Olympics. He qualified into the men's individual final in third place. In the final, he won the bronze medal behind Ivan Litvinovich and Dong Dong by only 0.110 ahead of the defending champion Uladzislau Hancharou. This marked the first time New Zealand won an Olympic medal in any gymnastics discipline. After the Olympic Games, he missed two months of training due to national lockdowns for COVID-19. He still competed at the World Championships where he finished seventh in the individual final.

=== 2022 ===
At the 2022 Rimini World Cup, Schmidt qualified for the individual final in first place. However, he landed his second somersault on the edge of the trampoline and had to conclude his routine early, finishing in last place. At the Coimbra World Cup, he won the gold medal in synchro with Reegan Laidlaw. At the 2022 World Championships in Sofia, Schmidt qualified for the individual final in first place. He then won the gold medal in the individual event by over two points ahead of France's Allan Morante. This was New Zealand's first world title in men's trampoline, and the first time since 2007 that a non-Chinese male athlete won the title.

=== 2023–2024 ===
Schmidt finished third in the individual event at the Santarem World Cup. Then at the Palm Beach World Cup, he won the silver medal behind China's Wang Zisai. He only finished 14th in the qualification round at the Varna World Cup and did not advance into the final. At the World Championships, he came off the trampoline during the qualification round and still advanced to the semi-finals, but he was eliminated in the semi-finals.

In April 2024, Schmidt was selected to represent New Zealand at the 2024 Summer Olympics.

== Media ==
Schmidt was a castaway on the 2022 series of the New Zealand reality television show Celebrity Treasure Island. He was eliminated in episode 15 but won $10,000 for Special Olympics New Zealand.

== Personal life ==
Outside of gymnastics, Schmidt enjoys hunting, fishing, and playing golf. As an ambassador for the New Zealand Olympic Committee, Schmidt travels to schools around the country to share his story. He holds a Bachelor of Commerce degree from the University of Auckland. As of 2024, he is dating fellow trampoline gymnast Maddie Davidson.
