= Doug Armstrong (disambiguation) =

Doug Armstrong (born 1964) is a Canadian ice hockey executive.

Doug Armstrong may also refer to:

- Doug Armstrong (broadcaster) (1931–2015), New Zealand cricketer, broadcaster and politician
- Doug Armstrong (curler), Canadian skip
- Doug Armstrong (musician), former bassist for the Australian band Jet

== See also ==
- Douglas Armstrong (disambiguation)
