= Ginga Munetomo =

Japanese trampoline gymnast

- Born: 7 April 1994 (age 32) Nishitokyo, Tokyo, Japan

Gymnastics career
- Discipline: Trampoline gymnastics
- Country represented: Japan
Medal record
Representing Japan
Youth Olympic Games
Bronze medal – third place	2010 Singapore	trampoline

Ginga Munetomo (棟朝 銀河, Munemoto Ginga, born 7 April 1994) is a Japanese trampoline gymnast. He competed in the trampoline competition at the 2016 Summer Olympics, where he finished in fourth place.
