= Douglas Armstrong (gymnast) =

Canadian trampoline gymnast (born 1996)

- Full name: Douglas Bernard Armstrong
- Born: 10 January 1996 (age 30) Surrey, British Columbia, Canada

Gymnastics career
- Discipline: Trampoline gymnastics
- Country represented: Canada (2014(?)-)
Medal record
Men's trampoline gymnastics
Representing Canada
World Championships
Silver medal – second place	2015 Odense	Double Mini Team
Pan American Championships
Silver medal – second place	2014 Mississauga	Double Mini Team

Douglas Bernard Armstrong (born 10 January 1996) is a Canadian double-mini trampoline gymnast, representing his nation at international competitions. He competed at world championships, including at the 2015 Trampoline World Championships, where he won the silver medal in the double-mini team event.
