= Li Dan (gymnast) =

Chinese trampoline gymnast

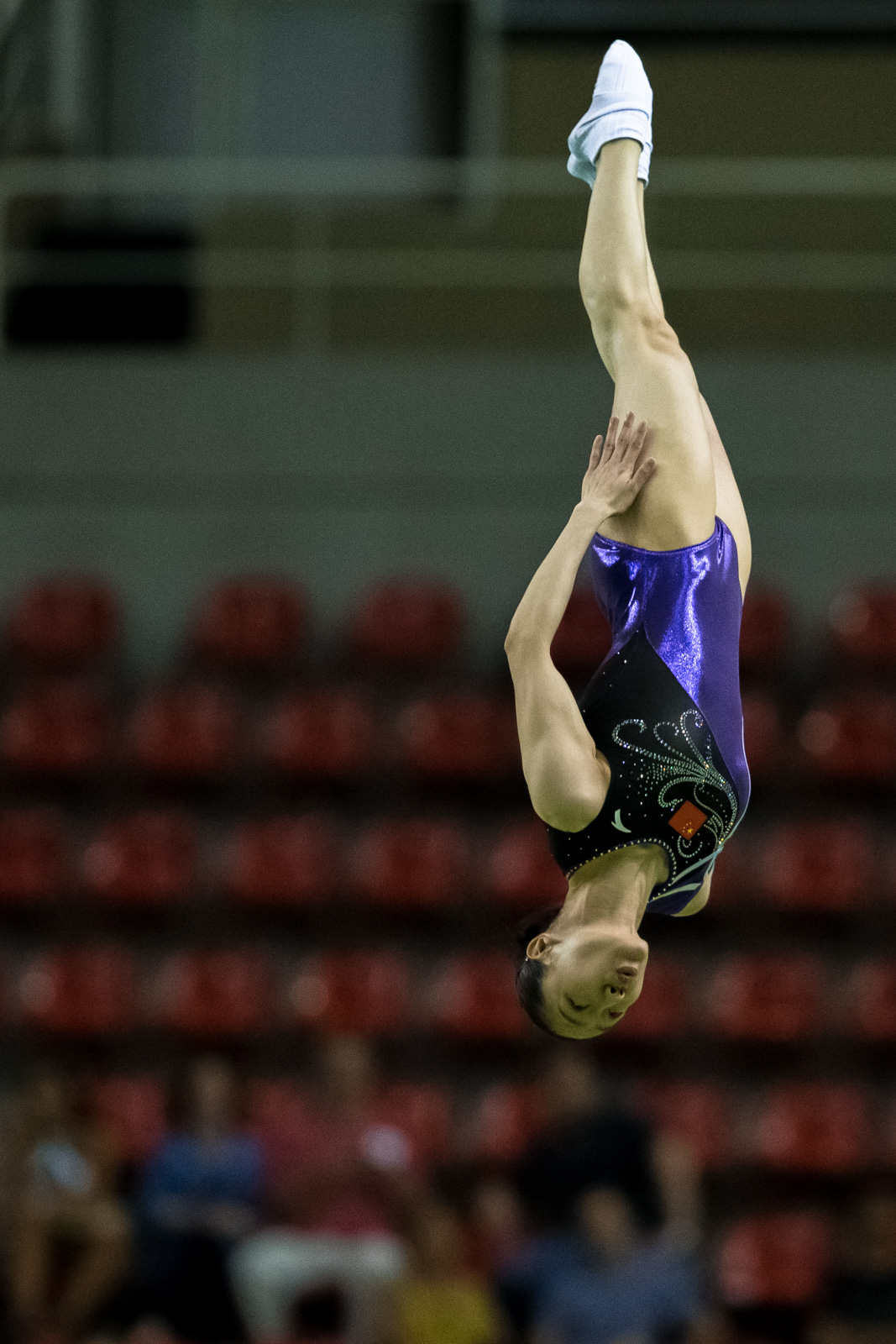
- Born: 19 September 1988 (age 38) Guangzhou
- Height: 156 cm (5 ft 1 in)

Gymnastics career
- Discipline: Trampoline gymnastics
- Country represented: China
- Club: Guangdong Provincial Team
- Head coach: Cai Guangliang
Medal record
Women's trampoline gymnastics
Representing China
Olympic Games
Bronze medal – third place	2016 Rio de Janeiro	Individual
World Championships
Gold medal – first place	2009 St. Petersburg	Synchro
Gold medal – first place	2009 St. Petersburg	Team
Gold medal – first place	2010 Metz	Individual
Gold medal – first place	2011 Birmingham	Team
Gold medal – first place	2015 Odense	Individual
Gold medal – first place	2015 Odense	Synchro
Gold medal – first place	2015 Odense	Team
Silver medal – second place	2013 Sofia	Synchro
Bronze medal – third place	2011 Birmingham	Individual
Bronze medal – third place	2013 Sofia	Individual
World Games
Gold medal – first place	2013 Cali	Synchro
Asian Games
Gold medal – first place	2014 Incheon	Individual

Li Dan (李丹, born 19 September 1988) is a Chinese former trampoline gymnast. In the individual event, she is the 2016 Olympic bronze medalist, a two-time World champion (2010, 2015), and the 2014 Asian Games champion. She is also a two-time World champion and the 2013 World Games champion in synchronized trampoline.

== Gymnastics career ==
Li began trampoline gymnastics in 1999 after previously training in diving and artistic gymnastics. She moved from Guangdong to Beijing in 2007 to train with the national team. She competed at her first World Championships in 2009 and won the synchro competition with Zhong Xingping. She also won a second gold medal in the team competition. At the 2010 World Championships, she became the individual World champion ahead of teammate Huang Shanshan. She won a gold medal with the Chinese team at the 2011 World Championships.

Li competed with Zhong in synchro at the 2013 World Games, and they tied for the gold medal with the British team of Kat Driscoll and Amanda Parker. Li and Zhong then finished second to Driscoll and Parker at the 2013 World Championships. There, Li also won a bronze medal in the individual event, behind Rosie MacLennan and Zhong. At the 2014 Asian Games, she won the individual title by over two points ahead of Zhong.

At the 2015 World Championships, Li swept the gold medals in the team, individual, and synchro events. She represented China at the 2016 Summer Olympics and qualified for the final in second place, behind Tatsiana Piatrenia. In the final, she scored 55.885 points and won the bronze medal, behind Rosie MacLennan and Bryony Page. At the 2017 World Games, she fell in the synchro final and was unable to defend the title alongside Zhong.

Li missed the 2018 season to become a mother but returned to the national team. She competed at the 2019 World Championships and placed 19th in the individual semi-final. She also helped China place fourth in the team competition. She announced her retirement from competition in 2021.
