= Pirmammad Aliyev =

Kazakhstani trampoline gymnast (born 1997)

- Born: 2 November 1997 (age 28) Shymkent, Kazakhstan
- Height: 170 cm (5 ft 7 in)

Gymnastics career
- Discipline: Trampoline gymnastics
- Country represented: Kazakhstan (2014-)
- Head coach: Valery Murtazin
Medal record
Men's trampoline gymnastics
Representing Kazakhstan
Asian Games
Bronze medal – third place	2018 Jakarta	Individual
Asian Championships
Gold medal – first place	2018 Manila	Individual

Pirmammad Aliyev (Пирмаммад Садиярович Алиев, born 2 November 1997) is a Kazakhstani individual and synchronised trampoline gymnast, representing his nation at international competitions. He competed at world championships, including at the 2014 and 2015 Trampoline World Championships.

== Personal ==
He studied sport at the Kazakh Academy of Sport and Tourism in Almaty.
