= 2012 Gymnastics Olympic Test Event =

International gymnastics competition

The 2012 Gymnastics Olympic Test Event took place between January 10 and January 18, 2012. The event featured the artistic gymnastics, rhythmic gymnastics and trampoline disciplines. It qualified the last four artistic gymnastics teams for the 2012 Olympic Games, along with 34 individual female gymnasts and 27 individual male gymnasts selected through the all-around competition. Teams that finished 17th to 24th at the 2011 World Artistic Gymnastics Championships were able to take two individuals to the test event. Teams that finished 1st to 8th were invited to send two individual gymnasts, but they were not candidates for individual spots.

The rhythmic gymnastics event, too, qualified four teams for the 2012 Olympic Games. Teams that finished 7th to 12th and the champion of the 2011 World Rhythmic Gymnastics Championships—along with the host nation of the test event, Great Britain—were invited participants, although the champion had already qualified for the Olympics. Because the world champion, Italy, decided not to attend, Azerbaijan, which placed 13th at the 2011 World Championships, was invited as a replacement. The test event also qualified five individual gymnasts for the Olympics. Twenty teams were invited to send one gymnast each according to their results at the 2011 World Championships. The host, Great Britain, could send one as well. The three medalists of the Championships were also invited despite their previous qualification to the Olympic Games. As two of the three medalists were not joining, two more teams were invited to send one gymnast apiece to the event.

In the trampolining event, seven individual competitors qualified for each of the Olympic events. These competitors were from countries that had not succeeded in qualifying an individual at the 2011 Trampoline World Championships.

The event was part of the London Prepares series of test events and took place at the 2012 Olympic venue, the North Greenwich Arena.

== Artistic Gymnastics ==
=== Men ===
==== Teams ====
- France
- Great Britain
- Spain
- Canada
- Brazil
- Puerto Rico
- Italy
- Belarus

==== Individuals ====
2 Gymnasts

- Switzerland: Pascal Bucher, Claudio Capelli
- Australia: Thomas Pichler, Samuel Offord
- Netherlands: Jeffrey Wammes, Epke Zonderland
- Portugal: Manuel Almeida Campos, Gustavo Palma Simões
- Hungary: Vid Hidvégi, Attila Racz
- Uzbekistan: Anton Fokin, Eduard Shaulov
- Colombia: Jorge Hugo Hiraldo Lopez, Jossimar Orlando Calvo Moreno
- Kazakhstan: Stephan Gorbachev, Ildar Valeyev

1 Gymnast

- Argentina: Federico Molinari
- Armenia: Artur Davtyan
- Austria: Fabian Leimlener
- Azerbaijan: Shakir Shikhaliyev
- Belgium: Jimmy Verbaeys
- Bulgaria: Iordan Jovtchev
- Chile: Tomás González
- Croatia: Filip Ude
- Cyprus: Irodotos Georgallas
- Czech Republic: Martin Konecny
- Egypt: Mohamed Sherif El Saharty
- Greece: Vlasios Maras
- Hong Kong: Wai Hung Shek
- Ireland: Kieran Behan
- Israel: Felix Aronovich
- Latvia: Dmitrijs Trefilovs
- Lithuania: Rokas Guscinas
- Luxembourg: Sascha Palgen
- Mexico: Daniel Corral Barron
- New Zealand: Patrick Peng
- Poland: Roman Kulesza
- Slovakia: Samuel Piasecký
- Chinese Taipei: Chih Yu Chen
- Venezuela: Adckixon Trejo
- Vietnam: Phạm Phước Hưng

==== Team Final ====
The Team Final happened on January 10. Four teams qualified for the Olympics. Team Great Britain won the competition (358,227), Team France was in 2nd place (350,669), Team Spain was in third place (347,292) and Team Italy qualified in 4th (346,334). Canada, Brazil, Puerto Rico and Belarus didn't qualify an entire team for 2012 Olympic Games.

Position	Country	Floor (gymnastics)	Pommel horse	Rings (gymnastics)	Vault (gymnastics)	Parallel bars	Horizontal bar	Team Total
1st	Great Britain	59.782	59.707	58.033	64.165	58.433	58.107	358.227
2nd	France	57.240	55.698	57.733	62.124	58.666	59.198	350.659
3rd	Spain	58.032	54.099	58.198	61.966	57.465	57.532	347.292
4th	Italy	56.632	55.665	59.299	62.498	56.941	55.299	346.334
5th	Canada	56.798	56.165	55.499	62.832	58.366	56.232	345.892
6th	Brazil	56.798	54.766	58.332	62.732	55.858	56.666	345.152
7th	Puerto Rico	58.265	53.799	57.099	60.732	54.831	55.366	340.092
8th	Belarus	54.565	56.432	56.031	60.965	55.832	51.999	335.824

==== Floor ====
Rank	Gymnast	D Score	E Score	Pen.	Total
1st place, gold medalist(s)	Daniel Purvis (GBR)	6.500	8.966		15.466
1st place, gold medalist(s)	Tomás González (CHI)	6.500	8.966		15.466
3rd place, bronze medalist(s)	Kristian Thomas (GBR)	6.300	9.033		15.333
4	Kieran Behan (IRL)	5.900	9.000		14.900
5	Gaël Da Silva (FRA)	6.200	8.633		14.833
6	Jossimar Calvo (COL)	6.400	8.133		14.533
7	Isaac Botella Pérez (ESP)	6.500	7.766		14.266
8	Ángel Ramos (PUR)	5.600	8.233		13.833

==== Pommel horse ====
Rank	Gymnast	D Score	E Score	Pen.	Total
1st place, gold medalist(s)	Louis Smith (GBR)	6.900	8.800		15.700
2nd place, silver medalist(s)	Max Whitlock (GBR)	6.500	8.600		15.100
3rd place, bronze medalist(s)	Andrey Likhovitskiy (BLR)	6.400	8.566		14.966
4	Alberto Busnari (ITA)	6.400	8.391		14.791
5	Vid Hidvégi (HUN)	6.100	8.566		14.666
5	Daniel Corral Barron (MEX)	5.800	8.866		14.666
7	Cyril Tommasone (FRA)	6.500	7.333		13.833
8	Shoichi Yamamoto (JPN)	5.600	7.700		13.300

==== Rings ====
Rank	Gymnast	D Score	E Score	Pen.	Total
1st place, gold medalist(s)	Arthur Nabarrete Zanetti (BRA)	6.500	9.033		15.533
2nd place, silver medalist(s)	Matteo Morandi (ITA)	6.700	8.733		15.433
3rd place, bronze medalist(s)	Tommy Ramos (PUR)	6.400	8.700		15.100
4	Danny Pinheiro-Rodrigues (FRA)	6.500	8.533		15.033
5	Matteo Angioletti (ITA)	6.400	8.533		14.933
6	Nikita Ignatyev (RUS)	6.300	8.566		14.866
7	Daniel Purvis (GBR)	6.100	8.666		14.766
8	Sergio Muñoz (ESP)	6.300	8.433		14.733

==== Vault ====
Position	Gymnast	D Score	E Score	Penalty	Score 1	D Score	E Score	Penalty	Score 2	Total
1st place, gold medalist(s)	Igor Radivilov (UKR)	7.000	9.133	0.1	16.033	7.000	9.466		16.466	16.249
2nd place, silver medalist(s)	Steven Legendre (USA)	6.600	9.200		15.800	6.600	9.333		15.933	15.866
3rd place, bronze medalist(s)	Kristian Thomas (GBR)	6.600	9.433	0.1	15.933	6.600	9.166		15.766	15.849
4	Matthias Fahrig (GER)	6.600	9.300		15.900	6.600	9.000	0.1	15.500	15.700
5	Tomás González (CHI)	6.600	9.400	0.1	15.900	7.000	8.066		15.066	15.483
6	Artur Davtyan (ARM)	6.600	8.900	0.3	15.200	6.200	9.500		15.700	15.450
7	Isaac Botella Pérez (ESP)	6.600	9.333		15.933	6.600	8.100	0.1	14.600	15.266
8	Ruslan Panteleymonov (GBR)	7.000	8.000	0.3	14.700	6.600	9.000	0.1	15.500	15.100

==== Parallel Bars ====
Rank	Gymnast	D Score	E Score	Pen.	Total
1st place, gold medalist(s)	Daniel Corral Barron (MEX)	6.300	9.000		15.300
2nd place, silver medalist(s)	Epke Zonderland (NED)	6.000	9.016		15.016
3rd place, bronze medalist(s)	Shoichi Yamamoto (JPN)	6.500	8.366		14.866
4	Masahiro Yoshida (JPN)	6.200	8.600		14.800
5	Roman Kulesza (POL)	6.000	8.766		14.766
6	Oleg Verniaiev (UKR)	6.100	8.500		14.600
7	Daniel Keatings (GBR)	5.700	8.833		14.533
8	Kenneth Ikeda (CAN)	5.700	7.100		12.800

==== Horizontal Bar ====
Rank	Gymnast	D score	E score	Pen.	Total
1st place, gold medalist(s)	Kristian Thomas (GBR)	6.500	8.433		14.933
2nd place, silver medalist(s)	Fabian Gonzalez (ESP)	6.500	8.366		14.866
3rd place, bronze medalist(s)	Jeffrey Wammes (NED)	6.600	8.266		14.866
4	Arnaud Willig (FRA)	6.100	8.633		14.733
5	Daniel Purvis (GBR)	6.000	8.433		14.433
6	Jossimar Calvo (COL)	6.800	7.200		14.000
7	Yann Cucherat (FRA)	6.000	7.433		13.433
8	Sergio Muñoz (ESP)	5.500	7.466		12.966

=== Women ===
==== Teams ====
- Italy
- Canada
- France
- Brazil
- Belgium
- South Korea
- Spain
- Netherlands

==== Individuals ====
2 Gymnasts

- Mexico: Elsa García Rodrigues, Ana Estafania Lago
- Switzerland: Giulia Steingruber, Nadia Muelhauser
- Ukraine: Angelina Kysla, Nataliya Kononenko
- Hungary: Dorina Böczögő, Laura Gombas
- Venezuela: Jessica López, Ivet Rojas
- Uzbekistan: Daria Elizarova, Luiza Galiulina
- Slovenia: Saša Golob, Adela Sajn
- Greece: Paschalina Mitrakou, Vasiliki Millousi

1 Gymnast

- Argentina: Valeria Pereyra
- Austria: Barbara Gasser
- Belarus: Nastassia Marachkouskaya
- Bulgaria: Ralitsa Mileva
- Chile: Simona Castro Lazo
- Colombia: Jessica Gil Ortiz
- Croatia: Tina Erceg
- Czech Republic: Kristýna Pálešová
- Dominican Republic: Yamilet Peña
- Finland: Annika Urvikko
- Great Britain: Rebecca Tunney
- Guatemala: Ana Sofía Gómez Porras
- Hong Kong: Hyu Ying Angel Wong
- Israel: Valeriia Maksyuta
- Kazakhstan: Moldir Azimbay
- Lithuania: Laura Svilpaite
- New Zealand: Jordan Rae
- Poland: Marta Pihan-Kulesza
- Portugal: Zoi Mafalda Lima
- Puerto Rico: Lorena Quinones Moreno
- South Africa: Ashleigh Heldsinger
- Singapore: Heem Wei Lin
- Slovakia: Mária Homolová
- Sweden: Jonna Adlerteg
- Turkey: Goksu Uctas
- Vietnam: Thi Ngan Thuong Do

==== Team Final ====
The team final happened on January, 11th. After solid presentations, Team Italy won the gold medal (224,624). Team Canada placed second (221,913) and team France placed third (220,744). Team Brazil placed 4th (217,985) and also qualified for 2012 Olympic Games.

Position	Country	Vault (gymnastics)	Uneven bars	Balance beam	Floor (gymnastics)	Total
1	Italy	56.699	54.966	57.124	55.832	224.621
2	Canada	57.066	55.599	54.766	54.482	221.913
3	France	56.457	56.365	53.790	54.132	220.744
4	Brazil	57.431	52.466	53.331	54.757	217.985
5	Belgium	55.800	52.398	54.033	54.632	216.863
6	South Korea	56.299	52.900	53.599	52.132	214.930
7	Spain	57.057	50.366	52.299	53.332	213.054
8	Netherlands	55.374	51.931	51.891	52.865	212.061

==== Vault ====
Rank	Gymnast	D Score	E Score	Pen.	Score 1	D Score	E Score	Pen.	Score 2	Total			
1st place, gold medalist(s)	Jade Barbosa (BRA)	D Score	5.800	9.166		D Score	14.966	5.600	9.033	Total		14.633	14.799
2nd place, silver medalist(s)	Valeriia Maksiuta (ISR)	D Score	5.800	8.800		D Score	14.600	5.900	8.700	Total		14.600	14.600
3rd place, bronze medalist(s)	Wyomi Masela (NED)	D Score	5.800	8.733		D Score	14.533	5.000	8.833	Total		13.833	14.183
4	Daniele Hypólito (BRA)	D Score	5.300	8.800	0.1	D Score	14.000	5.200	8.933	Total		14.1330	14.066
5	Giulia Steingruber (SUI)	D Score	6.300	7.500	0.1	D Score	13.700	5.200	8.733	Total	0.1	13.833	13.766
6	Erika Fasana (ITA)	D Score	5.800	8.783		D Score	14.583	5.000	7.833	Total		12.833	13.708
7	Anastasia Grishina (RUS)	D Score	5.300	7.600		D Score	12.900	4.800	7.566	Total		12.366	12.633
Rank	Gymnast	D Score	Vault 1			D Score	Vault 2			Total	Total		

Mexico's Elsa García also qualified to the vault final, but was injured during warmups and pulled out at the last moment. Because Garcia withdrew so soon before the competition, first alternate Yamilet Peña of the Dominican Republic did not have adequate time to warm up. Ergo, the vault final contained only seven gymnasts.

==== Uneven bars ====
Rank	Gymnast	D Score	E Score	Pen.	Total
1st place, gold medalist(s)	Anastasia Grishina (RUS)	6.500	8.533		15.033
2nd place, silver medalist(s)	Youna Dufournet (FRA)	6.500	8.300		14.800
3rd place, bronze medalist(s)	Yao Jinnan (CHN)	6.300	8.200		14.500
4	Kristina Vaculik (CAN)	5.800	8.666		14.466
5	Christine 'Peng Peng' Lee (CAN)	5.700	8.666		14.366
6	Rebecca Tunney (GBR)	6.300	7.966		14.266
7	Marta Pihan-Kulesza (POL)	5.700	8.266		13.966
8	Nataliya Kononenko (UKR)	6.400	7.300		13.700

==== Balance beam ====
Rank	Gymnast	D Score	E Score	Pen.	Total
1st place, gold medalist(s)	Carlotta Ferlito (ITA)	5.800	8.700		14.500
1st place, gold medalist(s)	Vasiliki Millousi (GRE)	5.900	8.600		14.500
3rd place, bronze medalist(s)	Valeriia Maksiuta (ISR)	5.800	8.500		14.300
4	Madeline Gardiner (CAN)	5.900	8.366		14.266
5	Francesca Deagostini (ITA)	5.600	8.533		14.133
6	Yao Jinnan (CHN)	5.800	7.700		13.500
7	Marine Brevet (FRA)	5.800	7.566		13.366
8	Sui Lu (CHN)	5.900	4.566	0.1	10.366

==== Floor ====
Rank	Gymnast	D Score	E Score	Pen.	Total
1st place, gold medalist(s)	Vanessa Ferrari (ITA)	5.800	8.600		14.400
2nd place, silver medalist(s)	Victoria Moors (CAN)	5.900	8.400	0.1	14.200
3rd place, bronze medalist(s)	Marine Brevet (FRA)	5.600	8.466		14.066
3rd place, bronze medalist(s)	Daiane dos Santos (BRA)	5.800	8.266		14.066
5	Carlotta Ferlito (ITA)	5.600	8.366		13.966
6	Ana Estefanía Lago (MEX)	5.600	8.266		13.866
7	Sui Lu (CHN)	5.600	8.233		13.833
8	Daniele Hypólito (BRA)	5.300	8.433		13.733

== Rhythmic Gymnastics ==
Results of Qualifying and Final Competitions.

=== Individual all-around ===
==== Qualification ====
Position	Gymnast	Ball	Penalty	Hoop	Penalty	Clubs	Penalty	Ribbon	Penalty	Total	Notes
1	Daria Kondakova (RUS)	27.375		28.700		26.900		26.500		109.475	Q
2	Anna Alyabyeva (KAZ)	27.050		27.225	0.05	27.225		27.150		108.650	Q X
3	Ganna Rizatdinova (UKR)	27.475	0.10	27.100	0.05	27.450		26.575	0.05	108.600	Q X
4	Carolina Rodriguez (ESP)	26.725	0.05	26.850		27.050		26.750		107.375	Q X
5	Chrystalleni Trikomiti (CYP)	27.000		26.700	0.10	26.750	0.05	26.900		107.350	Q X
6	Jana Berezko-Marggrander (GER)	26.175	0.05	25.925		26.850		26.700		105.650	Q X
7	Alexandra Piscupescu (ROU)	25.875		26.075		26.600		26.200	0.05	104.750	Q
8	Federica Febbo (ITA)	25.575		25.175	0.05	25.600		25.600		101.950	Q
9	Dora Vass (HUN)	24.525		25.975		25.675		25.725	0.05	101.900	Q
10	Djamila Rakhmatova (UZB)	25.200		25.500		25.200	0.10	25.025		100.925	Q
11	Varvara Filiou (GRE)	24.300		25.275		25.600		25.600		100.775	
12	Anna Gurbanova (AZE)	25.850	0.05	25.000		25.050		24.550		100.450	
13	Wong Poh San (MAS)	24.950		24.950		24.900		24.800		99.600	
14	Tsvetelina Stoyanova (BUL)	24.500		24.950		24.750	0.05	24.750		98.950	
15	Victoria Veinberg Filanovsky (ISR)	24.700		24.650		25.200		24.275		98.825	
16	Julie Zetlin (USA)	24.700		24.350		24.975		24.150		98.175	
17	Anna Czarniecka (POL)	24.100		25.050		24.400		24.200		97.750	
18	Runa Yamaguchi (JPN)	23.650		24.550		23.950		24.850		97.000	
19	Peng Linyi (CHN)	23.500		24.325		24.800		23.825		96.450	
20	Gim Yun Hee (KOR)	24.350		24.550		23.125		24.050		96.075	
21	Cynthia Valdez (MEX)	23.625		24.550		23.600		23.950		95.725	
22	Kseniya Moustafaeva (FRA)	22.500	0.25	22.600	0.40	23.550	0.30	23.850		92.500	
23	Tjasa Seme (SLO)	22.650		22.225		22.150	0.20	23.050		90.075	
24	Nicol Ruprecht (AUT)	21.500		23.850	0.10	21.925	0.10	21.950	0.05	89.225	
25	Francesca Jones (GBR)	20.550	0.40	22.475		22.325	0.10	23.250		88.600	

- Q = Qualified for Event Finals
- X = Qualified for an Olympic place

==== Finals ====
Position	Gymnast	Ball	Penalty	Hoop	Penalty	Clubs	Penalty	Ribbon	Penalty	Total	Notes
1st place, gold medalist(s)	Daria Kondakova (RUS)	28.150		28.600		26.100		27.600		110.450	
2nd place, silver medalist(s)	Ganna Rizatdinova (UKR)	27.300	0.10	27.300		27.350		26.800		108.750	
3rd place, bronze medalist(s)	Anna Alyabyeva (KAZ)	26.700		27.025	0.05	27.050		27.300		108.075	
4	Carolina Rodriguez (ESP)	27.050		26.800		27.000		26.550		107.400	
5	Chrystalleni Trikomiti (CYP)	26.800		26.450	0.10	26.750		26.550		106.550	
6	Alexandra Piscupescu (ROU)	26.450		25.650		26.800		26.500	0.05	105.400	
7	Jana Berezko-Marggrander (GER)	26.450		26.200		26.150		26.350		105.150	
8	Federica Febbo (ITA)	25.300		25.650		25.850		24.850		101.650	
9	Djamila Rakhmatova (UZB)	25.200		25.600		25.650	0.05	25.150		101.600	
10	Dora Vass (HUN)	25.600		24.400	0.05	25.100		25.750		100.850	

==== Team all-around ====
===== Qualification =====
The top 4 teams in the qualification event qualified for the 2012 Olympics.

Place	Nation	5	3 + 2	Total
1	Spain	26.900 (1)	26.950 (1)	53.850
2	Ukraine	26.850 (2)	26.400 (2)	53.250
3	Israel	26.300 (3)	25.600 (3)	51.900
4	Greece	25.850 (4)	25.275 (4)	51.125
5	Switzerland	24.300 (6)	25.050 (5)	49.350
6	France	24.750 (5)	24.400 (6)	49.150
7	Azerbaijan	23.500 (7)	24.000 (7)	47.500
8	United Kingdom	23.100 (8)	21.850 (8)	44.950

===== Final =====
Place	Nation	5	3 + 2	Total
1st place, gold medalist(s)	Spain	26.400 (1)	26.850 (1)	53.250
2nd place, silver medalist(s)	Israel	24.775 (4)	25.750 (3)	50.525
3rd place, bronze medalist(s)	France	25.350 (3)	25.050 (5)	50.400
3rd place, bronze medalist(s)	Greece	24.775 (4)	25.625 (4)	50.400
5	Switzerland	25.800 (2)	24.300 (6)	50.100
6	Ukraine	23.850 (8)	25.800 (2)	49.650
7	Azerbaijan	24.600 (6)	22.650 (8)	47.250
8	United Kingdom	24.100 (7)	23.100 (7)	47.200

== Trampoline ==
Results of Qualifying and Final Competitions

=== Men ===
==== Qualification ====
Position	Athlete	Compulsory	Voluntary	Total	Notes
1	Dong Dong (CHN)	50.804	59.675	110.479	Q
2	Lu Chunlong (CHN)	50.590	58.680	109.270	Q
3	Masaki Ito (JPN)	49.375	59.415	108.790	Q
4	Jason Burnett (CAN)	48.869	57.500	106.369	Q X
5	Diogo Ganchinho (POR)	48.420	56.750	105.170	Q X
6	Blake Gaudry (AUS)	48.710	56.760	104.470	Q X
7	Henrik Stehlik (GER)	48.560	55.180	103.740	Q X
8	Nuno Merino (POR)	47.750	55.980	103.730	Q
9	Flavio Cannone (ITA)	47.475	56.175	103.650	X
10	Steven Gluckstein (USA)	48.060	55.280	103.340	X
11	Peter Jensen (DEN)	48.380	54.720	103.100	X
12	Mikalai Kazak (BLR)	47.225	55.450	102.675	
13	Keegan Soehn (CAN)	47.425	55.075	102.500	
14	Logan Dooley (USA)	46.085	55.740	101.825	
15	Viatchaslau Modzel (BLR)	47.140	54.610	101.750	
16	Nicolas Schori (SUI)	46.945	53.200	100.145	

- Q = Qualified for Event Finals
- X = Qualified for an Olympic place

==== Finals ====
Position	Athlete	Difficulty	Execution	Time	Total	Notes
1st place, gold medalist(s)	Dong Dong (CHN)	17.1	26.3	17.975	61.375	
2nd place, silver medalist(s)	Lu Chunlong (CHN)	17.1	26.0	18.065	61.165	
3rd place, bronze medalist(s)	Masaki Ito (JPN)	16.6	26.1	18.085	60.785	
4	Jason Burnett (CAN)	16.0	24.8	17.275	58.075	
5	Blake Gaudry (AUS)	16.0	24.2	17.065	57.265	
6	Henrik Stehlik (GER)	15.4	24.7	16.455	56.555	
7	Nuno Merino (POR)	16.6	22.5	17.020	56.120	
8	Diogo Ganchinho (POR)	15.2	22.7	16.405	54.305	

=== Women ===
==== Qualification ====
Position	Athlete	Compulsory	Voluntary	Total	Notes
1	He Wenna (CHN)	47.689	54.765	102.454	Q
2	Rosannagh MacLennan (CAN)	46.880	54.695	101.575	Q
3	Katherine Driscoll (GBR)	46.710	54.390	101.100	Q
4	Luba Golovina (GEO)	47.665	53.125	100.780	Q X
5	Ana Rente (POR)	46.800	53.285	100.085	Q X
6	Zita Frydrychova (CZE)	46.130	53.235	99.365	Q X
7	Galina Goncharenko (RUS)	46.290	52.955	99.245	Q X
8	Andrea Lenders (NED)	46.120	52.535	98.655	Q X
9	Maryna Kyiko (UKR)	45.745	52.275	98.020	X
10	Ayano Kishi (JPN)	45.485	52.110	97.595	X
11	Ekaterina Khilko (UZB)	46.365	50.930	97.295	
12	Marina Murinova (FRA)	44.040	50.810	94.850	
13	Giovanna Matheus (BRA)	44.830	49.875	94.705	
14	Claudia Prat (ESP)	44,715	48.945	93.660	
15	Ayana Yamada (JPN)	45.265	48.245	93.510	
16	Li Dan (CHN)	47.615	44.170	91.785	
17	Silvia Saiote (POR)	25.705	49.115	74.820	

- Q = Qualified for Event Finals
- X = Qualified for an Olympic place

==== Finals ====
Position	Athlete	Difficulty	Execution	Time	Total	Notes
1st place, gold medalist(s)	Rosannagh MacLennan (CAN)	15.4	23.6	15.520	54.520	
2nd place, silver medalist(s)	Andrea Lenders (NED)	14.0	24.2	15.850	54.050	
3rd place, bronze medalist(s)	Ana Rente (POR)	14.4	23.6	16.035	54.035	
4	Katherine Driscoll (GBR)	14.4	23.8	15.530	53.730	
5	Galina Goncharenko (RUS)	14.1	23.7	15.565	53.365	
6	Zita Frydrychova (CZE)	13.6	23.6	15.105	52.305	
7	He Wenna (CHN)	14.4	20.9	16.205	51.505	
8	Luba Golovina (GEO)	12.8	21.1	13.745	47.645	

== See also ==
- 2011 World Artistic Gymnastics Championships
- 2011 World Rhythmic Gymnastics Championships
- 2011 Trampoline World Championships
