= 2010 Trampoline World Championships =

27th trampoline world championships, Arénes de Metz, France

The 27th Trampoline World Championships was held at Arènes de Metz in Metz, France from 11 to 13 November 2010.

== Medal table ==
Rank	Nation	Gold	Silver	Bronze	Total
1	China (CHN)	3	3	0	6
2	Russia (RUS)	2	1	3	6
3	Canada (CAN)	1	0	1	2
4	Portugal (POR)	1	0	0	1
4	Ukraine (UKR)	1	0	0	1
6	France (FRA)	0	1	1	2
7	Germany (GER)	0	1	0	1
7	South Africa (RSA)	0	1	0	1
7	United States (USA)	0	1	0	1
10	Japan (JPN)	0	0	2	2
11	Belarus (BLR)	0	0	1	1
Totals (11 entries)		8	8	8	24

== Medal winners ==
Event	Gold	Silver	Bronze
Men
Individual	Dong Dong (CHN)	Ye Shuai (CHN)	Yasuhiro Ueyama (JPN)
Double Mini	Andre Lico (POR)	Austin White (USA)	Evgeny Chernoivanov (RUS)
Tumbling	Viktor Kyforenko (UKR)	Yang Song (CHN)	Andrey Krylov (RUS)
Synchro	China; Tu Xiao; Dong Dong	France; Sebastien Martiny; Gregoire Pennes	Japan; Tetsuya Sotomura; Masaki Ito
Women
Individual	Li Dan (CHN)	Huang Shanshan (CHN)	Rosannagh MacLennan (CAN)
Double Mini	Corissa Boychuk (CAN)	Bianca Budler (RSA)	Svetlana Balandina (RUS)
Tumbling	Anna Korobeynikova (RUS)	Elena Krasnokutskaya (RUS)	Marine Debauve (FRA)
Synchro	Russia; Irina Karavaeva; Victoria Voronina	Germany; Carina Baumgartner; Anna Dogonadze	Belarus; Tatsiana Piatrenia; Katsiaryna Mironava

== Results ==
=== Men ===
==== Individual ====
Qualification

Rank	Gymnast	Note
1	Dong Dong (CHN)	Q
2	Shuai Ye (CHN)	Q
3	Tu Xiao (CHN)	
4	Tetsuya Sotomura (JPN)	Q
5	Yasuhiro Ueyama (JPN)	Q
6	Dmitry Ushakov (RUS)	Q
7	Chunlong Lu (CHN)	
8	Gregoire Pennes (FRA)	Q
9	Manabu Yamaguchi (JPN)	
10	Nikita Fedorenko (RUS)	Q
11	Martin Gromowski (GER)	Q
12	Steven Gluckstein (USA)	
13	Henrik Stehlik (GER)	
14	Diogo Ganchinho (POR)	
15	Peter Jensen (DEN)	
16	Sebastien Martiny (FRA)	
17	Charles Thibault (CAN)	
18	Blake Gaudry (AUS)	
19	Maksym Volianskyi (UKR)	
20	Michael Devine (USA)	
21	Mickael Jala (FRA)	
22	Viatchaslau Modzel (BLR)	
23	Ben Wilden (AUS)	
24	Oleksandr Chernonos (UKR)	
25	Dennis Luxon-Pitkamin (GER)	
26	Daniel Schmidt (GER)	
27	Jeffrey Gluckstein (USA)	
28	Lukasz Tomaszewski (POL)	
29	Viacheslav Makovetskyi (UKR)	
30	Martin Myers (CAN)	
31	Dario Aloi (ITA)	
32	Fernando Gotschin (NED)	
33	Carlos Ramirez Pala (BRA)	
34	Bartlomiej Hes (POL)	
35	Aliaksei Kouhar (SUI)	
36	Samuel Castela (POR)	
37	Nicolas Schori (SUI)	
38	Yasen Ivanov (BUL)	
39	Alejandro Ruiz-Cuevas Quintero (ESP)	
40	Philip Barbaro (CAN)	
41	Yernur Syzdyk (KAZ)	
42	Jose Manuel Munoz (ESP)	
43	Ty Swadling (AUS)	
44	Nicolau Marques (POR)	
45	Alon Katz (ISR)	
46	Nicholas Joyce (GBR)	
47	Joey Dias (SUI)	
48	Ali Djaber Brahimi (ALG)	
49	Benjamin Lucky Radebe (RSA)	
50	Strike Nkuna (RSA)	
51	Aleksandar Petkov (BUL)	
52	Daniel Praest (DEN)	
53	Flavio Cannone (ITA)	
54	Zsolt Juhasz (HUN)	
55	Stefano Crastolla (ITA)	
56	David Jimenez Ortiz (ESP)	
57	Orlando Gotschin (NED)	
58	Lokmane Zakaria Sabour (ALG)	
59	Plamen Suhov (BUL)	
60	Daniel Greaves (GBR)	
61	Christian Andersen (DEN)	
62	Rafael Andrade (BRA)	
63	Logan Dooley (USA)	
64	Sergei Chumak (RUS)	
65	Marc Pinol Berlandino (ESP)	
66	Tengizi Koshkadze (GEO)	
67	Tomasz Adamczyk (POL)	
68	Marat Mustafin (UZB)	
69	Masaki Ito (JPN)	
70	Mikhail Mel'Nik (RUS)	
71	Yuriy Nikitin (UKR)	
72	Matteo Campus (FRA)	
73	Rodrigo Pacheco (BRA)	
74	Yauhen Zhukouski (BLR)	
75	Steven Williams (GBR)	
76	Ran Markovich (ISR)	
77	Loic Schir (SUI)	
78	Carl Rom-Colthoff (CAN)	
79	Einar Utbo (SWE)	
80	Oswaldo Prieto Angel (MEX)	
81	Jonas Nordfors (SWE)	
82	Toufik Cheikhi (ALG)	
83	Dimitar Iliev (BUL)	
84	Oscar Smith (SWE)	
85	Nuno Merino (POR)	
86	Faraj Alhamad (QAT)	
87	Jorge Yannick Garcia Miranda (MEX)	

Final

Rank	Gymnast	Points
Gold medal	Dong Dong (CHN)	43.100
Silver medal	Ye Shuai (CHN)	43.100
Bronze medal	Yasuhiro Ueyama (JPN)	42.400
4	Nikita Fedorenko (RUS)	41.400
5	Dmitry Ushakov (RUS)	41.300
6	Gregoire Pennes (FRA)	41.300
7	Tetsuya Sotomura (JPN)	41.300
8	Martin Gromowski (GER)	9.000

==== Double Mini ====
Rank	Gymnast	Points
Gold medal	Andre Lico (POR)	73.400
Silver medal	Austin White (USA)	73.000
Bronze medal	Evgeny Chernoivanov (RUS)	72.700
4	Alexander Renkert (USA)	72.100
5	Jack Penny (AUS)	70.700
6	Alejandro Quintero (ESP)	69.900
7	Alexander Seifert (CAN)	68.600
8	Alexander Zebrov (RUS)	60.400

==== Tumbling ====
Rank	Gymnast	Points
Gold medal	Viktor Kyforenko (UKR)	76.300
Silver medal	Yang Song (CHN)	75.400
Bronze medal	Andrey Krylov (RUS)	74.600
4	Tao Yi (CHN)	72.800
5	Tagir Murtazaev (RUS)	70.300
6	Dzmitry Darashuk (BLR)	69.600
7	Artem Pysaryev (UKR)	67.100
8	Kalon Ludvigson (USA)	58.500

==== Synchro ====
Rank	Country	Gymnast	Points
Gold medal	China	Tu Xiao; Dong Dong	53.800
Silver medal	France	Sebastien Martiny; Gregoire Pennes	51.700
Bronze medal	Japan	Tetsuya Sotomura; Masaki Ito	51.300
4	Belarus	Viatchaslau Modzel; Mikalai Kazak	50.300
5	Portugal	Nuno Merino; Diogo Ganchinho	47.600
6	United States	Steven Gluckstein; Logan Dooley	30.000
7	Russia	Sergey Azaryan; Mikhail Melnik	25.300
8	Denmark	Daniel Praest; Peter Jensen	10.400

=== Women ===
==== Individual ====
Qualification

Rank	Gymnast	Note
1	Huang Shanshan (CHN)	Q
2	Dan Li (CHN)	Q
3	Wenna He (CHN)	
4	Irina Karavaeva (RUS)	Q
5	Xingping Zhong (CHN)	
6	Tatsiana Piatrenia (BLR)	Q
7	Luba Golovina (GEO)	Q
8	Anna Dogonadze (GER)	Q
9	Bryony Page (GBR)	Q
10	Rosannagh Maclennan (CAN)	Q
11	Ana Rente (POR)	
12	Katherine Driscoll (GBR)	
13	Marina Murinova (FRA)	
14	Emma Smith (GBR)	
15	Andrea Lenders (NED)	
16	Anna Savkina (UZB)	
17	Victoria Voronina (RUS)	
18	Claudia Prat (ESP)	
19	Savannah Vinsant (USA)	
20	Maryna Kyiko (UKR)	
21	Zita Frydrychova (CZE)	
22	Mariah Madigan (CAN)	
23	Cristina Sainz Bernabeu (ESP)	
24	Ekaterina Khilko (UZB)	
25	Amanda Parker (GBR)	
26	Mika Futagi (JPN)	
27	Nani Vercruyssen (USA)	
28	Dakota Earnest (USA)	
29	Laura Paris (FRA)	
30	Ayana Yamada (JPN)	
31	Camille Dru (FRA)	
32	Svitlana Syvanych (UKR)	
33	Samantha Smith (CAN)	
34	Ana Simoes (POR)	
35	Kirsten Boersma (NED)	
36	Carina Baumgaertner (GER)	
37	Angeliki Zevgara (GRE)	
38	Aslin Styles (AUS)	
39	Makiko Matsuda (JPN)	
40	Nataliia Moskvina (UKR)	
41	Vanessa Dos Santos (BRA)	
42	Samira Zehtabchi (SUI)	
43	Bethany Bailey (AUS)	
44	Laura Garcia Martinez (ESP)	
45	Melanie Peterhans (SUI)	
46	Lara Hueninghake (GER)	
47	Alexandra Kohler (GER)	
48	Daienne Cardoso Lima (BRA)	
49	Gemma Samantha Zamudio Gomez (MEX)	
50	Maria Reynaud Calderon (MEX)	
51	Naomi Nishioka (JPN)	
52	Joana Di Carlo Conde Perez (BRA)	
53	Petra Anyzova (CZE)	
54	Alejandra Fernandez Lomeli (MEX)	
55	Galina Goncharenko (RUS)	
56	Anna Ivanova (RUS)	
57	Claire Lizarraga Capdepon (ESP)	
58	Olena Syvanych (UKR)	
59	Katsiaryna Mironava (BLR)	
60	Marine Jurbert (FRA)	
61	Elina Angelidou (GRE)	
62	Taissa Garcia (BRA)	

Rank	Gymnast	Points
Gold medal	Li Dan (CHN)	40.300
Silver medal	Huang Shanshan (CHN)	39.800
Bronze medal	Rosannagh MacLennan (CAN)	39.300
4	Bryony Page (GBR)	38.600
5	Tatsiana Piatrenia (BLR)	38.300
6	Irina Karavaeva (RUS)	38.200
7	Anna Dogonadze (GER)	37.300
8	Luba Golovina (GEO)	4.200

==== Double Mini ====
Rank	Gymnast	Points
Gold medal	Corissa Boychuk (CAN)	70.500
Silver medal	Bianca Budler (RSA)	70.300
Bronze medal	Svetlana Balandina (RUS)	70.200
4	Galina Goncharenko (RUS)	66.700
5	Mckenna Kurz (USA)	64.000
6	Silvia Saiote (POR)	34.200
7	Adeva Bryan (GBR)	33.000
8	Robyn Osborne (GBR)	32.400

==== Tumbling ====
Rank	Gymnast	Points
Gold medal	Anna Korobeynikova (RUS)	68.200
Silver medal	Elena Krasnokutskaya (RUS)	65.500
Bronze medal	Marine Debauve (FRA)	63.400
4	Yuliya Hall (USA)	61.600
5	Zara McLean (GBR)	61.400
6	Kyla Phillips (RSA)	61.300
7	Karly Judkins (USA)	60.000
8	Emily Smith (CAN)	58.000

==== Synchro ====
Rank	Country	Gymnast	Points
Gold medal	Russia	Irina Karavaeva; Victoria Voronina	47.500
Silver medal	Germany	Carina Baumgartner; Anna Dogonadze	46.800
Bronze medal	Belarus	Tatsiana Piatrenia; Katsiaryna Mironava	46.800
4	Japan	Mika Futagi; Ayana Yamada	46.200
5	France	Marine Jurbert; Marina Murinova	46.000
6	Uzbekistan	Ekaterina Khilko; Anna Savkina	45.100
7	Great Britain	Amanda Parker; Bryony Page	43.300
8	China	Zhong Xingping; Li Dan	42.500
