= 2011 Trampoline World Championships =

The 28th Trampoline and Tumbling World Championships were held in Birmingham, England, from 17 to 20 November 2011 at the National Indoor Arena. This event was the first qualifying round for the 2012 Olympics which was held in London. The top 8 men and women automatically earned their nation quota places for the Olympics, subject to a maximum of two quota places per nation. A further 16 of each sex will get a second chance to earn a quota place at the London test event in January 2012 for a further five spots.

== Medal summary ==
Event	Gold	Silver	Bronze
Men
Individual Trampoline	Lu Chunlong (CHN)	Dong Dong (CHN)	Masaki Ito (JPN)
Synchro	China (CHN); Tu Xiao; Dong Dong	Japan (JPN); Takashi Sakamoto; Yasuhiro Ueyama	Belarus (BLR); Viatchaslau Modzel; Mikalai Kazak
Trampoline Team	Japan (JPN); Tetsuya Sotamora; Yasuhiro Ueyama; Masaki Ito	China (CHN); Tu Xiao; Lu Chunlong; Dong Dong	Russia (RUS); Aleksey Ilichev; Nikita Fedorenko; Dmitry Ushakov
Double Mini	Bruno Martini (BRA)	Austin White (USA)	Evgeny Chernoivanov (RUS)
Double Mini Team	Canada (CAN); Denis Vachon; Alexander Seifert; Keegan Soehn; Jonathon Schwaiger	Brazil (BRA); Bruno Martini; Edmon Vidal de Abreu; Arthur Iotte; Rodrigo Isidoro Bachur	United States (USA); Ryan Roberts; Austin White; Kalon Ludvigson; Trey Katz
Tumbling	Yang Song (CHN)	Zhang Luo (CHN)	Andrey Krylov (RUS)
Tumbling Team	China (CHN); Zhang Lingfeng; Zhang Luo; Yang Song; Yi Tao	Russia (RUS); Grigory Noskov; Tagir Murtazaev; Andrey Krylov; Mikhail Kostyanov	Canada (CAN); Jonathon Schwaiger; Jocelyn Charpentier-Leclerc; Alexander Seifert; Vincenc Lavoie
Women
Individual Trampoline	He Wenna (CHN)	Rosannagh MacLennan (CAN)	Li Dan (CHN)
Synchro	Germany (GER); Jessica Simon; Anna Dogonadze	Canada (CAN); Karen Cockburn; Rosannagh MacLennan	Great Britain (GBR); Kat Driscoll; Amanda Parker
Trampoline Team	China (CHN); He Wenna; Li Dan; Huang Shanshan	Great Britain (GBR); Kat Driscoll; Laura Gallagher; Emma Smith	Canada (CAN); Karen Cockburn; Rosannagh MacLennan; Samantha Smith
Double Mini	Svetlana Balandina (RUS)	Bianca Zoonekynd (RSA)	Victoria Voronina (RUS)
Double Mini Team	Canada (CAN); Gillian Bruce; Mariah Madigan; Corissa Boychuk; Chelsea Nerpio	Portugal (POR); Joana da Silva Pereira; Andreia Robalo; Silvia Saiote; Ana Robalo	United States (USA); Kristle Lowell; Marina Moskalenko; Erin Jauch; Erica Owen
Tumbling	Jia Fangfang (CHN)	Anna Korobeynikova (RUS)	Anzhelika Soldatkina (RUS)
Tumbling Team	China (CHN); Lingxi Chen; Fangfang Jia; Zhang Yuanyuan; Shuang Guan	Russia (RUS); Victoria Danilenko; Anzhelika Soldatkina; Anna Korobeynikova; Elena Krasnokutskaya	France (FRA); Mathilde Millory; Lauriane Lamperim; Jessica Courreges-Clercq

== Men's Results ==
=== Individual Trampoline ===
Qualification

Rank	Gymnast	Note
1	Dong Dong (CHN)	
2	Chunlong Lu (CHN)	
3	Tu Xiao (CHN)	
4	Shuai Ye (CHN)	
5	Masaki Ito (JPN)	
6	Yasuhiro Ueyama (JPN)	
7	Dmitry Ushakov (RUS)	
8	Tetsuya Sotomura (JPN)	
9	Gregoire Pennes (FRA)	
10	Nikita Fedorenko (RUS)	
11	Yuriy Nikitin (UKR)	
12	Jason Burnett (CAN)	
13	Mikalai Kazak (BLR)	
14	Diogo Ganchinho (POR)	
15	Peter Jensen (DEN)	
16	Blake Gaudry (AUS)	
17	Takashi Sakamoto (JPN)	
18	Aleksey Ilichev (RUS)	
19	Viatchaslau Modzel (BLR)	
20	Henrik Stehlik (GER)	
21	Nuno Merino (POR)	
22	Flavio Cannone (ITA)	
23	Maksym Volianskyi (UKR)	
24	Matteo Campus (FRA)	
25	Nicolas Schori (SUI)	
26	Logan Dooley (USA)	
27	Keegan Soehn (CAN)	
28	Steven Gluckstein (USA)	
29	Daniel Praest (DEN)	
30	Carlos Ramirez Pala (BRA)	
31	Luke Strong (GBR)	
32	Shaun Swadling (AUS)	
33	Bartlomiej Hes (POL)	
34	Dmytro Byedyevkin (UKR)	
35	Apostolos Koutavas (GRE)	
36	Romain Legros (FRA)	
37	Lukasz Tomaszewski (POL)	
38	Aliaksei Kouhar (SUI)	
39	Jack Helme (GBR)	
40	Tomasz Adamczyk (POL)	
41	Samuel Castela (POR)	
42	Anton Pryshchepau (BLR)	
43	Daniel Schmidt (GER)	
44	William Morris (AUS)	
45	Dario Aloi (ITA)	
46	Akzhol Zamanbekov (KAZ)	
47	Diogo Abreu (POR)	
48	Jonas Nordfors (SWE)	
49	Nikolaos Savvidis (GRE)	
50	Charles Thibault (CAN)	
51	Maxim Van Zeijl (NED)	
52	Yasen Ivanov (BUL)	
53	James Lange (NZL)	
54	Joey Dias (SUI)	
55	Justin Dougal (NZL)	
56	Marat Mustafin (UZB)	
57	Fabian Wyler (SUI)	
58	Rafael Andrade (BRA)	
59	Alon Katz (ISR)	
60	Joris Geens (BEL)	
61	Jose Alberto Vargas Garcia (MEX)	
62	Gurkan Mutlu (TUR)	
63	Rene Alejandro Navarro Gutierrez (MEX)	
64	Aleksandar Petkov (BUL)	
65	Stefano Crastolla (ITA)	
66	Ran Markovich (ISR)	
67	Strike Nkuna (RSA)	
68	Adam Sult (CZE)	
69	Zsolt Juhasz (HUN)	
70	Orlando Gotschin (NED)	
71	Tewfik Chikhi (ALG)	
72	Victor Armando Reyes Encarnacion (MEX)	
73	Lokmane Zakaria Sabour (ALG)	
74	Natanael Camara (PUR)	
75	Martin Pelc (CZE)	
76	Facundo Vallejo (ARG)	
77	Ahmed Rady Mostafa (EGY)	
78	Yernur Syzdyk (KAZ)	
79	Mikhail Mel'Nik (RUS)	
80	Karsten Kuritz (GER)	
81	Michael Devine (USA)	
82	Lucas Adorno (ARG)	
83	Marc Pinol Berlandino (ESP)	
84	Sebolai Offering Tlaka (RSA)	
85	Te Aroha Kierran Tuhi (NZL)	
86	Martin Gromowski (GER)	
87	Bernardo Aquino (ARG)	
88	Yauhen Zhukouski (BLR)	
89	Rodrigo Pacheco (BRA)	
90	James Higgins (GBR)	
91	Sebastien Martiny (FRA)	
92	Carlos Arturo Paez Buitrago (COL)	
93	Kyle Soehn (CAN)	
94	Oscar Smith (SWE)	
95	Alvaro Calero Ramon (ESP)	
96	Ali Djaber Brahimi (ALG)	
97	Ty Swadling (AUS)	
98	Fernando Gotschin (NED)	
99	Jose Fernando Cajigas Villa (MEX)	
100	Alejandro Milan Vega (ESP)	
101	Benjamin Lucky Radebe (RSA)	
102	Jaime Ponce Alfaro (ESP)	
103	Naim Ashhab (CZE)	
104	Juan Carlos Valcarcel Quitian (COL)	
105	Nathan Bailey (GBR)	
106	Jeffrey Gluckstein (USA)	

Final

The men's individual trampoline final was held on 19 November.

Rank	Gymnast	D Score	E Score	T Score	Pen.	Total
1st place, gold medalist(s)	(China) Lu Chunlong	17.100	27.000	18.045		62.145
2nd place, silver medalist(s)	(China) Dong Dong	17.800	26.300	17.360		61.460
3rd place, bronze medalist(s)	(Japan) Masaki Ito	16.600	26.799	17.465		60.864
4	(Russia) Nikita Fedorenko	16.800	25.875	17.630		60.305
5	(Ukraine) Yuriy Nikitin	16.600	24.800	17.085		58.485
6	(France) Gregoire Pennes	17.100	23.400	16.905		57.405
7	(Russia) Dmitry Ushakov	9.300	12.500	9.105		30.905
8	(Japan) Yasuhiro Ueyama	5.500	7.800	5.495		18.795

=== Synchro ===
The men's synchro final was held on 20 November.

Position	Team	D Score	E Score	S Score	Penalty	Total
1st place, gold medalist(s)	China; Tu Xiao; Dong Dong	17.100	17.300	18.000	0.000	52.400
2nd place, silver medalist(s)	Japan; Takashi Sakamoto; Yasuhiro Ueyama	16.200	16.900	18.800	0.000	51.700
3rd place, bronze medalist(s)	Belarus; Viatchaslau Modzel; Mikalai Kazak	15.800	16.500	18.400	0.000	50.700
4	Germany; Daniel Schmidt; Dennis Luxon-Pitkamin	15.400	16.200	19.000	0.000	50.600
5	Russia; Nikita Fedorenko; Dmitry Ushakov	15.800	17.400	17.200	0.000	50.400
6	France; Sebastien Martiny; Gregoire Pennes	16.000	15.700	18.000	0.000	49.700
7	Great Britain; Nathan Bailey; Luke Strong	15.600	15.300	17.800	0.000	48.700
8	Denmark; Peter Jensen; Daniel Praest	10.700	10.700	12.400	0.000	33.800

=== Trampoline Team ===
The men's trampoline team final was held on 18 November.

Rank	Team	Score
1st place, gold medalist(s)	Japan	175.474
1st place, gold medalist(s)	Tatsuya Sotomura	58.234
1st place, gold medalist(s)	Yasuhiro Ueyama	57.685
1st place, gold medalist(s)	Masaki Ito	59.555
1st place, gold medalist(s)	Takashi Sakamoto	-
2nd place, silver medalist(s)	China	154.440
2nd place, silver medalist(s)	Tu Xiao	59.595
2nd place, silver medalist(s)	Lu Chunlong	59.235
2nd place, silver medalist(s)	Dong Dong	35.610
2nd place, silver medalist(s)	Ye Shuai	-
3rd place, bronze medalist(s)	Russia	152.030
3rd place, bronze medalist(s)	Aleksey Ilichev	35.080
3rd place, bronze medalist(s)	Nikita Fedorenko	57.875
3rd place, bronze medalist(s)	Dmitry Ushakov	59.075
3rd place, bronze medalist(s)	Mikhail Melnik	-
4	France	118.235
4	Matteo Campus	54.895
4	Sebastien Martiny	6.355
4	Gregoire Pennes	56.985
4	Romain Legros	-
5	Ukraine	75.760
5	Dmytro Byedyevkin	5.990
5	Maksym Volianskyi	11.960
5	Yuriy Nikitin	57.810

=== Double Mini ===
The men's double mini final was held on 20 November.

Rank	Gymnast	D Score	E Score	Penalty	Score	Total
1st place, gold medalist(s)	(Brazil) Bruno Martini	10.800	26.200		37.000	73.300
1st place, gold medalist(s)	(Brazil) Bruno Martini	10.400	25.900		36.300	73.300
2nd place, silver medalist(s)	(United States) Austin White	9.600	26.200		35.800	72.800
2nd place, silver medalist(s)	(United States) Austin White	9.900	27.100		37.000	72.800
3rd place, bronze medalist(s)	(Russia) Evgeny Chernoivanov	8.000	27.000		35.000	71.800
3rd place, bronze medalist(s)	(Russia) Evgeny Chernoivanov	10.400	26.400		36.800	71.800
4	(Canada) Keegan Soehn	8.000	27.400		35.400	71.200
4	(Canada) Keegan Soehn	8.400	27.400		35.800	71.200
5	(Canada) Denis Vachon	9.200	26.900		36.100	71.100
5	(Canada) Denis Vachon	10.000	25.000		35.000	71.100
6	(Portugal) André Pocinho	8.000	28.000		36.000	70.500
6	(Portugal) André Pocinho	7.600	26.900		34.500	70.500
7	(Russia) Alexander Zebrov	8.000	28.900		36.900	61.800
7	(Russia) Alexander Zebrov	5.100	19.800		24.900	61.800
8	(United States) Ryan Roberts	8.400	27.200		35.600	58.200
8	(United States) Ryan Roberts	3.600	19.000		22.600	58.200

=== Double Mini Team ===
The men's double mini team final was held on 19 November.

Rank	Team	Score
1st place, gold medalist(s)	Canada	108.600
1st place, gold medalist(s)	Denis Vachon	37.700
1st place, gold medalist(s)	Alexander Seifert	36.500
1st place, gold medalist(s)	Keegan Soehn	34.400
1st place, gold medalist(s)	Jonathon Schwaiger	-
2nd place, silver medalist(s)	Brazil	103.200
2nd place, silver medalist(s)	Edmon Vidal de Abreu	35.100
2nd place, silver medalist(s)	Arthur Iotte	31.600
2nd place, silver medalist(s)	Bruno Martini	36.500
2nd place, silver medalist(s)	Rodrigo Isidoro Bachur	-
3rd place, bronze medalist(s)	United States	85.600
3rd place, bronze medalist(s)	Ryan Roberts	24.200
3rd place, bronze medalist(s)	Austin White	37.300
3rd place, bronze medalist(s)	Kalon Ludvigson	24.100
3rd place, bronze medalist(s)	Trey Katz	-
4	Russia	61.700
4	Alexander Zebrov	37.800
4	Valery Anisimov	23.900
4	Evgeny Chernoivanov	0.000
4	Mikhail Zalomin	-
5	Portugal	60.400
5	Bruno Nobre	24.200
5	André Fernandes	36.200
5	Andre Lico	0.000
5	André Pocinho	-

=== Tumbling ===
The men's individual tumbling final was held on 20 November.

Rank	Gymnast	D Score	E Score	Penalty	Score	Total
1st place, gold medalist(s)	(China) Yang Song	12.100	28.000		40.100	79.100
1st place, gold medalist(s)	(China) Yang Song	11.600	27.400		39.000	79.100
2nd place, silver medalist(s)	(China) Zhang Luo	11.600	27.300		38.900	76.500
2nd place, silver medalist(s)	(China) Zhang Luo	10.500	27.100		37.600	76.500
3rd place, bronze medalist(s)	(Russia) Andrey Krylov	10.900	27.000		37.900	75.800
3rd place, bronze medalist(s)	(Russia) Andrey Krylov	10.700	27.200		37.900	75.800
4	(United Kingdom) Kristof Willerton	9.900	27.400		37.300	73.300
4	(United Kingdom) Kristof Willerton	9.700	26.300		36.000	73.300
5	(United States) Kalon Ludvigson	10.400	25.400		35.800	73.200
5	(United States) Kalon Ludvigson	10.000	27.400		37.400	73.200
6	(Denmark) Mikael Nissen	9.000	27.200		36.200	71.800
6	(Denmark) Mikael Nissen	8.800	26.800		35.600	71.800
7	(Russia) Tagir Murtazaev	11.600	27.000		38.600	68.200
7	(Russia) Tagir Murtazaev	6.800	22.800		29.600	68.200
8	(Ukraine) Viktor Kyforenko	6.800	24.700		31.500	31.500
8	(Ukraine) Viktor Kyforenko	0.000	0.000		0.000	31.500

=== Tumbling Team ===
The men's tumbling team final was held on 18 November.

Rank	Team	Score
1st place, gold medalist(s)	China	115.500
1st place, gold medalist(s)	Zhang Lingfeng	37.100
1st place, gold medalist(s)	Zhang Luo	37.300
1st place, gold medalist(s)	Yang Song	41.100
1st place, gold medalist(s)	Tao Yi	-
2nd place, silver medalist(s)	Russia	113.000
2nd place, silver medalist(s)	Grigory Noskov	37.600
2nd place, silver medalist(s)	Tagir Murtazaev	38.200
2nd place, silver medalist(s)	Andrey Krylov	37.200
2nd place, silver medalist(s)	Mikhail Kostyanov	-
3rd place, bronze medalist(s)	Canada	103.100
3rd place, bronze medalist(s)	Jonathon Schwaiger	33.100
3rd place, bronze medalist(s)	Jocelyn Charpentier-Leclerc	33.600
3rd place, bronze medalist(s)	Alexander Seifert	36.400
3rd place, bronze medalist(s)	Vincent Lavoie	-
4	Great Britain	100.300
4	Jordan Lucas	35.000
4	Shaun Gregory	28.600
4	Kristof Willerton	36.700
4	Daniel Lannigan	-
5	Denmark	96.300
5	Tobias Brems-Hulgaard	28.300
5	Lasse Soerensen	32.700
5	Mikael Nissen	35.300
5	Peter Rasmussen	-

== Women's Results ==
=== Individual Trampoline ===
Qualification

Rank	Gymnast	Note
1	Wenna He (CHN)	
2	Dan Li (CHN)	
3	Huang Shanshan (CHN)	
4	Karen Cockburn (CAN)	
5	Xingping Zhong (CHN)	
6	Tatsiana Piatrenia (BLR)	
7	Rosannagh Maclennan (CAN)	
8	Anna Dogonadze (GER)	
9	Katherine Driscoll (GBR)	
10	Savannah Vinsant (USA)	
11	Laura Gallagher (GBR)	
12	Zita Frydrychova (CZE)	
13	Galina Goncharenko (RUS)	
14	Emma Smith (GBR)	
15	Maryna Kyiko (UKR)	
16	Jessica Simon (GER)	
17	Ana Rente (POR)	
18	Luba Golovina (GEO)	
19	Ayano Kishi (JPN)	
20	Ekaterina Khilko (UZB)	
21	Sviatlana Makshtarova (BLR)	
22	Andrea Lenders (NED)	
23	Samantha Smith (CAN)	
24	Marina Murinova (FRA)	
25	Ayana Yamada (JPN)	
26	Giovanna Venetiglio Bastos Matheus (25x17px)	
27	Silvia Saiote (25x17px)	
28	Dakota Earnest (USA)	
29	Claudia Prat (ESP)	
30	Bryony Page (GBR)	
31	Joelle Vallez (FRA)	
32	Mina Terada (JPN)	
33	Melanie Peterhans (SUI)	
34	Mariah Madigan (CAN)	
35	Nani Vercruyssen (USA)	
36	Cristina Sainz Bernabeu (ESP)	
37	Chisato Doihata (JPN)	
38	Marine Jurbert (FRA)	
39	Alaina Williams (USA)	
40	Sarah Eckes (GER)	
41	Rachel Schmidt (NZL)	
42	Justine Brodelet (BEL)	
43	Julie Perreten (FRA)	
44	Henriette Verstraten (NED)	
45	Maila Walmod (DEN)	
46	Alejandra Fernandez Lomeli (MEX)	
47	Daienne Cardoso Lima (BRA)	
48	Assel Yegizkarayeva (KAZ)	
49	Ana Pacheco (POR)	
50	Fanny Chilo (SUI)	
51	Melina Wirtz (ARG)	
52	Claire Coetzee (NZL)	
53	Mara Colombo (ARG)	
54	Claire Lizarraga Capdepon (ESP)	
55	Maria Fernanda Reynaud Calderon (25x17px)	
56	Gemma Zamudio Gomez (25x17px)	
57	Taissa Garcia (BRA)	
58	Natalya Kolesnikova (RUS)	
59	Bianca Zoonekynd (RSA)	
60	Niny Johanna Bulla Garzon (COL)	
61	Lara Hueninghake (GER)	
62	Beatriz Martins (POR)	
63	Nataliia Moskvina (UKR)	
64	Katish Hidari Hernandez Recalde (ESP)	
65	Jessica Alysse Shaw (NZL)	
66	Katsiaryna Mironava (BLR)	
67	Svitlana Syvanych (UKR)	
68	Michelle Xel Ha Garcia Lopez (MEX)	
69	Bethany Bailey (AUS)	
70	Hanna Harchonak (BLR)	
71	Katarina Prokesova (SVK)	
72	Petra Anyzova (CZE)	
73	Victoria Voronina (RUS)	
74	Kirsten Boersma (NED)	
75	Olena Syvanych (UKR)	
76	Tara Fokke (NED)	
77	Nadezda Glebova (RUS)	
78	Kylie Walker (NZL)	

Final

The women's individual trampoline final took place on 20 November.

Rank	Gymnast	D Score	E Score	T Score	Pen.	Total
1st place, gold medalist(s)	(China) He Wenna	14.800	25.000	16.475		56.275
2nd place, silver medalist(s)	(Canada) Rosannagh MacLennan	15.000	24.600	15.760		55.360
3rd place, bronze medalist(s)	(China) Li Dan	15.000	24.400	15.930		55.330
4	(Canada) Karen Cockburn	14.200	24.800	15.940		54.940
5	(Belarus) Tatsiana Piatrenia	15.000	22.900	15.710		53.610
6	(Germany) Anna Dogonadze	13.700	24.200	15.375		53.375
7	(United States) Savannah Vinsant	14.500	23.000	15.585		53.085
8	(United Kingdom) Katherine Driscoll	3.200	4.900	3.405		11.505

=== Synchro ===
The women's synchro final took place on 19 November.

Position	Team	D Score	E Score	S Score	Penalty	Total
1st place, gold medalist(s)	Germany; Anna Dogonadze; Jessica Simon	13.100	16.600	18.400	0.000	48.100
2nd place, silver medalist(s)	Canada; Rosannagh MacLennan; Karen Cockburn	13.600	16.600	17.400	0.000	47.600
3rd place, bronze medalist(s)	Great Britain; Katherine Driscoll; Amanda Parker	13.300	16.300	17.400	0.000	47.000
4	United States; Alaina Williams; Dakota Earnest	12.900	15.800	17.600	0.000	46.300
5	Ukraine; Nataliia Moskvina; Maryna Kyiko	12.300	14.000	10.800	0.000	37.100
6	Spain; Cristina Sainz Bernabeu; Laura Garcia Martinez	7.200	14.800	14.800	0.000	36.800
7	France; Julie Perreten; Marine Jurbert	7.100	8.900	9.200	0.000	25.200
8	China; Li Meng; Huang Shanshan	1.700	1.600	1.800	0.000	5.100

=== Trampoline Team ===
The women's trampoline team final took place on 18 November.

Rank	Team	Score
1st place, gold medalist(s)	China	164.485
1st place, gold medalist(s)	He Wenna	55.430
1st place, gold medalist(s)	Huang Shanshan	54.575
1st place, gold medalist(s)	Li Dan	54.480
1st place, gold medalist(s)	Zhong Xingping	-
2nd place, silver medalist(s)	Great Britain	159.585
2nd place, silver medalist(s)	Emma Smith	53.325
2nd place, silver medalist(s)	Laura Gallagher	51.935
2nd place, silver medalist(s)	Katherine Driscoll	55.325
2nd place, silver medalist(s)	Bryony Page	-
3rd place, bronze medalist(s)	Canada	159.085
3rd place, bronze medalist(s)	Samantha Smith	51.000
3rd place, bronze medalist(s)	Rosannagh MacLennan	55.210
3rd place, bronze medalist(s)	Karen Cockburn	52.875
3rd place, bronze medalist(s)	Mariah Madigan	-
4	United States	152.840
4	Nani Vercruyssen	50.325
4	Dakota Earnest	50.215
4	Savannah Vinsant	52.300
4	Alaina Williams	-
5	Germany	136.145
5	Lara Hueninghake	31.135
5	Jessica Simon	51.540
5	Anna Dogonadze	53.470
5	Sarah Eckes	-

=== Double Mini ===
The women's double mini final was held on 20 November.

Rank	Gymnast	D Score	E Score	Penalty	Score	Total
1st place, gold medalist(s)	(Russia) Svetlana Balandina	6.400	28.300		34.700	70.200
1st place, gold medalist(s)	(Russia) Svetlana Balandina	7.200	28.300		35.500	70.200
2nd place, silver medalist(s)	(South Africa) Bianca Zoonekynd	7.200	27.200		34.400	69.700
2nd place, silver medalist(s)	(South Africa) Bianca Zoonekynd	6.800	28.500		35.300	69.700
3rd place, bronze medalist(s)	(Russia) Victoria Voronina	6.800	28.400		35.200	68.700
3rd place, bronze medalist(s)	(Russia) Victoria Voronina	6.800	26.700		33.500	68.700
4	(United Kingdom) Adeva Bryan	6.000	27.700		33.700	66.800
4	(United Kingdom) Adeva Bryan	5.200	27.900		33.100	66.800
5	(Portugal) Andreia Robalo	6.000	27.300		33.300	64.500
5	(Portugal) Andreia Robalo	5.600	25.600		31.200	64.500
6	(United Kingdom) Robyn Osborne	5.600	27.100		32.700	56.100
6	(United Kingdom) Robyn Osborne	3.600	19.800		23.400	56.100
7	(United States) Kristle Lowell	2.400	19.000		21.400	54.600
7	(United States) Kristle Lowell	5.200	28.000		33.200	54.600
8	(Canada) Corissa Boychuk	5.600	27.800		33.400	33.400
8	(Canada) Corissa Boychuk	0.000	0.000		0.000	33.400

=== Double Mini Team ===
The women's double mini team final was held on 19 November.

Rank	Team	Score
1st place, gold medalist(s)	Canada	104.100
1st place, gold medalist(s)	Gillian Bruce	34.600
1st place, gold medalist(s)	Mariah Madigan	35.000
1st place, gold medalist(s)	Corissa Boychuk	34.500
1st place, gold medalist(s)	Chelsea Nerpio	-
2nd place, silver medalist(s)	Portugal	102.900
2nd place, silver medalist(s)	Joana da Silva Pereira	33.400
2nd place, silver medalist(s)	Andreia Robalo	34.900
2nd place, silver medalist(s)	Silvia Saiote	34.600
2nd place, silver medalist(s)	Ana Robalo	-
3rd place, bronze medalist(s)	United States	100.800
3rd place, bronze medalist(s)	Kristle Lowell	33.600
3rd place, bronze medalist(s)	Marina Moskalenko	33.800
3rd place, bronze medalist(s)	Erin Jauch	33.400
3rd place, bronze medalist(s)	Erica Owen	-
4	Russia	99.800
4	Anastasia Velichko	32.400
4	Victoria Voronina	34.600
4	Svetlana Balandina	32.800
4	Mariya Kozlova	-
5	Great Britain	99.600
5	Courtney Warne	32.900
5	Adeva Bryan	31.800
5	Robyn Osborne	34.900
5	Georgina Varley	-

=== Tumbling ===
Rank	Gymnast	D Score	E Score	Penalty	Score	Total
1st place, gold medalist(s)	(China) Jia Fangfang	7.800	27.800		35.600	71.700
1st place, gold medalist(s)	(China) Jia Fangfang	7.900	28.200		36.100	71.700
2nd place, silver medalist(s)	(Russia) Anna Korobeynikova	8.300	27.100		35.400	70.900
2nd place, silver medalist(s)	(Russia) Anna Korobeynikova	7.900	27.600		35.500	70.900
3rd place, bronze medalist(s)	(Russia) Anzhelika Soldatkina	7.700	27.000		34.700	68.400
3rd place, bronze medalist(s)	(Russia) Anzhelika Soldatkina	6.700	27.000		33.700	68.400
4	(China) Chen Lingxi	6.400	27.500		33.900	67.100
4	(China) Chen Lingxi	6.300	26.900		33.200	67.100
5	(Canada) Emily Smith	6.500	25.100		31.600	64.900
5	(Canada) Emily Smith	7.100	26.200		33.300	64.900
6	(United Kingdom) Zara McLean	6.200	27.300		33.500	62.700
6	(United Kingdom) Zara McLean	6.100	23.100		29.200	62.700
7	(United Kingdom) Rachel Letsche	3.900	24.800		28.700	61.600
7	(United Kingdom) Rachel Letsche	5.900	27.000		32.900	61.600
8	(France) Jessica Courreges-Clercq	3.900	23.900		27.800	59.600
8	(France) Jessica Courreges-Clercq	4.700	27.100		31.800	59.600

=== Tumbling Team ===
The women's tumbling team final was held on 19 November.

Rank	Team	Score
1st place, gold medalist(s)	China	102.000
1st place, gold medalist(s)	Chen Lingxi	33.900
1st place, gold medalist(s)	Jia Fangfang	35.900
1st place, gold medalist(s)	Zhang Yuanyuan	32.200
1st place, gold medalist(s)	Guan Shuang	-
2nd place, silver medalist(s)	Russia	101.000
2nd place, silver medalist(s)	Victoria Danilenko	32.200
2nd place, silver medalist(s)	Anzhelika Soldatkina	33.500
2nd place, silver medalist(s)	Anna Korobeynikova	35.300
2nd place, silver medalist(s)	Elena Krasnokutskaya	-
3rd place, bronze medalist(s)	France	95.200
3rd place, bronze medalist(s)	Mathilde Millory	31.100
3rd place, bronze medalist(s)	Lauriane Lamperim	32.200
3rd place, bronze medalist(s)	Jessica Courreges-Clercq	31.900
4	United States	88.200
4	Kaylah Whaley	29.300
4	Natalya Beneschott	27.400
4	Marina Moskalenko	31.500
5	Great Britain	87.400
5	Jennifer Dawes	28.500
5	Rachael Letsche	33.900
5	Zara McLean	25.000
5	Samantha Rochett	-
