= Trampoline gymnastics at the 2009 World Games – Men's synchronized trampoline =

Men's synchronized trampoline at the World Games
- Venue: Kaohsiung Arena
- Date: 20 July 2009
- Competitors: 24 from 12 nations

Medalists
1st place, gold medalist(s)		Masaki Ito; Shunsuke Nagasaki
2nd place, silver medalist(s)		Sébastien Martiny; Grégoire Pennes
3rd place, bronze medalist(s)		Martin Gromowski; Dennis Luxon

The men's synchronized trampoline competition in trampoline gymnastics at the 2009 World Games took place on 20 July 2009 at the Kaohsiung in Kaohsiung Arena, Chinese Taipei.

== Competition format ==
A total of 12 pairs entered the competition. Best 8 duets from preliminary advances to the final.

== Results ==
=== Preliminary ===
Rank	Athlete	Nation	Round 1	Round 2	Total	Note
1	Masaki Ito; Shunsuke Nagasaki	Japan	39.200	50.500	89.700	Q
2	Olexander Chernonos; Yuri Nikitin	Ukraine	40.200	49.300	89.500	Q
3	Sébastien Martiny; Grégoire Pennes	France	39.800	49.600	89.400	Q
4	Nikalai Kazak; Viacheslav Model	Belarus	39.500	47.600	87.100	Q
5	Diogo Ganchinho; Nuno Merino	Portugal	37.500	49.400	86.900	Q
6	Logan Dooley; Steven Gluckstein	United States	38.000	48.600	86.600	Q
7	Martin Gromowski; Dennis Luxon	Germany	38.800	47.700	86.500	Q
8	Peter Jensen; Daniel Præst	Denmark	37.900	48.400	86.300	Q
9	Blake Gaudry; Ben Wilden	Australia	39.300	46.900	86.200	
10	Tomasz Adamczyk; Łukasz Tomaszewski	Poland	39.000	46.500	85.500	
11	Nikita Fedorenko; Alexander Rusakov	Russia	37.200	45.700	82.900	
12	Dario Aloi; Flavio Cannone	Italy	37.000	34.500	71.500	

=== Final ===
Rank	Athlete	Nation	Score
1st place, gold medalist(s)	Masaki Ito; Shunsuke Nagasaki	Japan	51.100
2nd place, silver medalist(s)	Sébastien Martiny; Grégoire Pennes	France	50.000
3rd place, bronze medalist(s)	Martin Gromowski; Dennis Luxon	Germany	49.500
4	Diogo Ganchinho; Nuno Merino	Portugal	49.400
5	Olexander Chernonos; Yuri Nikitin	Ukraine	49.100
6	Logan Dooley; Steven Gluckstein	United States	48.700
7	Peter Jensen; Daniel Præst	Denmark	48.200
8	Nikalai Kazak; Viacheslav Model	Belarus	33.600
