= Gymnastics at the 2014 Asian Games – Men's trampoline =

Men's individual at the 2014 Asian Games
- Venue: Namdong Gymnasium
- Date: 26 September 2014
- Competitors: 10 from 6 nations

Medalists
gold medal	Dong Dong	China
silver medal	Tu Xiao	China
bronze medal	Yasuhiro Ueyama	Japan

The men's individual trampoline competition at the 2014 Asian Games in Incheon, South Korea was held on 26 September 2014 at the Namdong Gymnasium.

== Schedule ==
All times are Korea Standard Time (UTC+09:00)

Date	Time	Event
Friday, 26 September 2014	15:00	Qualification
Friday, 26 September 2014	17:00	Final

== Results ==
=== Qualification ===
Rank	Athlete	Routine 1	Routine 2	Total
1	Tu Xiao (CHN)	50.400	60.750	111.150
2	Dong Dong (CHN)	51.010	59.265	110.275
3	Yasuhiro Ueyama (JPN)	48.905	58.670	107.575
4	Masaki Ito (JPN)	49.795	54.185	103.980
5	Pirmammad Aliyev (KAZ)	47.830	55.205	103.035
6	Samirbek Usmonov (UZB)	46.615	51.820	98.435
7	Rafael Fatkhelyanov (KAZ)	45.820	47.900	93.720
8	Lee Min-woo (KOR)	40.345	46.780	87.125
9	Cha Sang-youp (KOR)	40.280	18.070	58.350
10	Saeed Qassem (QAT)	29.025	5.555	34.580

=== Final ===
Rank	Athlete	Score
1st place, gold medalist(s)	Dong Dong (CHN)	62.480
2nd place, silver medalist(s)	Tu Xiao (CHN)	60.435
3rd place, bronze medalist(s)	Yasuhiro Ueyama (JPN)	59.415
4	Masaki Ito (JPN)	59.350
5	Pirmammad Aliyev (KAZ)	56.380
6	Samirbek Usmonov (UZB)	53.085
7	Rafael Fatkhelyanov (KAZ)	52.475
8	Lee Min-woo (KOR)	45.695
