= Gymnastics at the 2012 Summer Olympics – Women's trampoline =

Women's trampoline at the Games of the XXX Olympiad
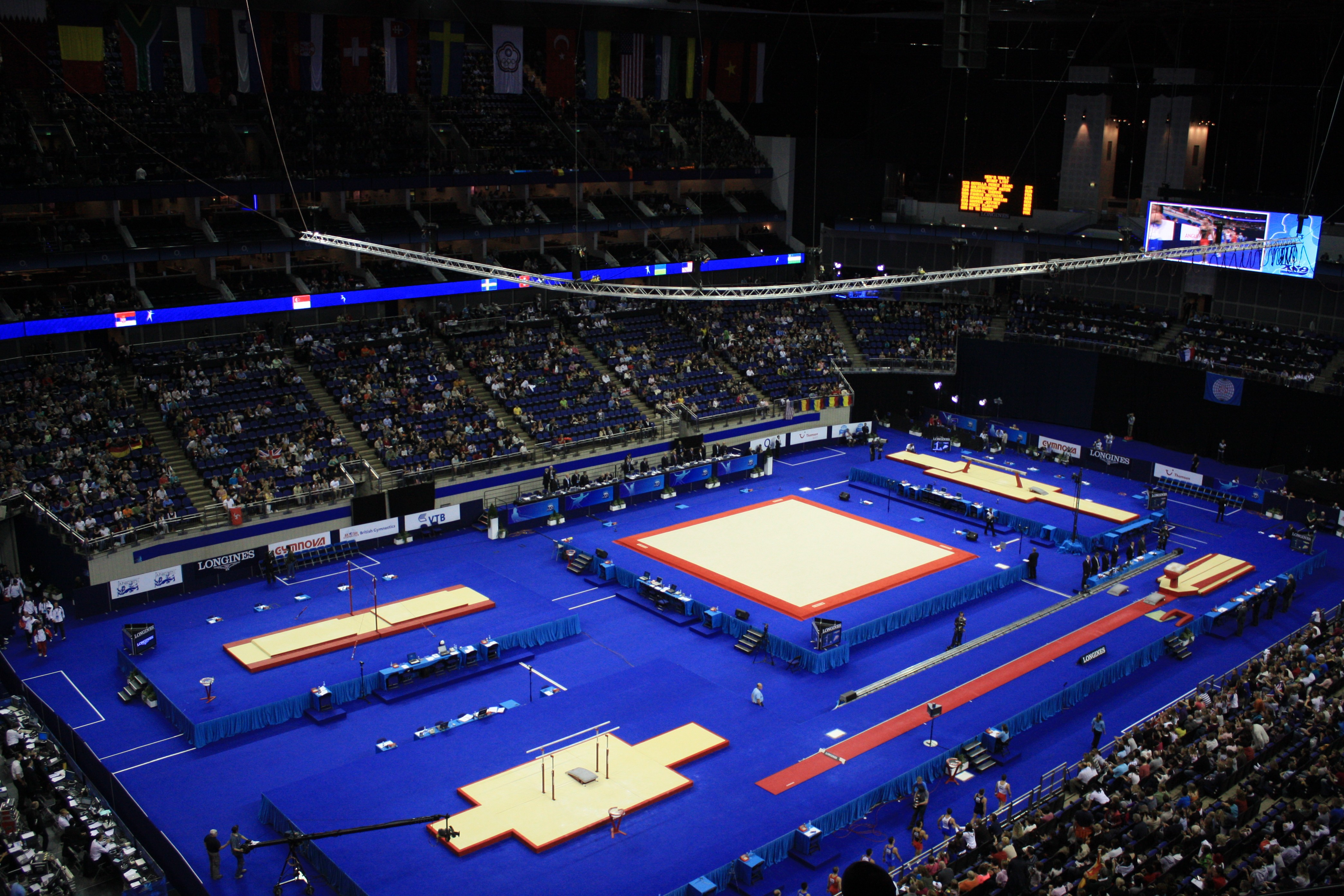
- North Greenwich Arena
- Venue: North Greenwich Arena
- Date: 4 August
- Competitors: 16 from 14 nations

Medalists
1st place, gold medalist(s)		Rosannagh MacLennan	Canada
2nd place, silver medalist(s)		Huang Shanshan	China
3rd place, bronze medalist(s)		He Wenna	China

The women's trampoline competition at the 2012 Summer Olympics took place at the North Greenwich Arena on 4 August.

== Competition format ==
In the qualification round, each gymnast performed two routines: compulsory and voluntary. Scores for the two were summed, and the top eight competitors moved on to the final. In the final, each gymnast performed a single routine, with qualification scores not carrying over.

== Results ==
=== Qualification ===
Position	Athlete	Country	Compulsory	Voluntary	Penalty	Total	Notes
1	He Wenna	China	48.860	56.640		105.500	Q
2	Huang Shanshan	China	48.499	56.260		104.759	Q
3	Tatsiana Piatrenia	Belarus	48.785	55.970		104.755	Q
4	Rosannagh MacLennan	Canada	48.230	56.220		104.450	Q
5	Karen Cockburn	Canada	47.900	56.045		103.945	Q
6	Luba Golovina	Georgia	47.805	53.935		101.740	Q
7	Savannah Vinsant	United States	46.400	54.955		101.355	Q
8	Victoria Voronina	Russia	47.150	53.845		100.995	Q
9	Kat Driscoll	Great Britain	46.335	54.650		100.985	
10	Anna Dogonadze	Germany	46.540	53.830		100.370	
11	Ana Rente	Portugal	47.265	53.010		100.275	
12	Ekaterina Khilko	Uzbekistan	47.240	52.050		99.290	
13	Andrea Lenders	Netherlands	46.270	51.845		98.115	
14	Ayano Kishi	Japan	45.745	52.240		97.985	
15	Zita Frydrychová	Czech Republic	44.345	32.215		76.560	
16	Maryna Kyiko	Ukraine	41.940	31.520		73.460	

=== Final ===
Position	Athlete	Difficulty	Execution	Flight	Penalty	Total	Notes
1st place, gold medalist(s)	Rosannagh MacLennan (CAN)	15.400	25.600	16.305		57.305	
2nd place, silver medalist(s)	Huang Shanshan (CHN)	15.000	25.400	16.330		56.730	
3rd place, bronze medalist(s)	He Wenna (CHN)	14.800	24.800	16.350		55.950	
4	Karen Cockburn (CAN)	14.800	25.000	16.060		55.860	
5	Tatsiana Piatrenia (BLR)	14.400	25.200	16.070		55.670	
6	Savannah Vinsant (USA)	14.500	24.400	16.065		54.965	
7	Luba Golovina (GEO)	14.400	23.100	15.425		52.925	
8	Victoria Voronina (RUS)	6.100	9.200	6.615		21.915	
