= Gymnastics at the 2012 Summer Olympics – Men's trampoline =

Men's trampoline at the Games of the XXX Olympiad
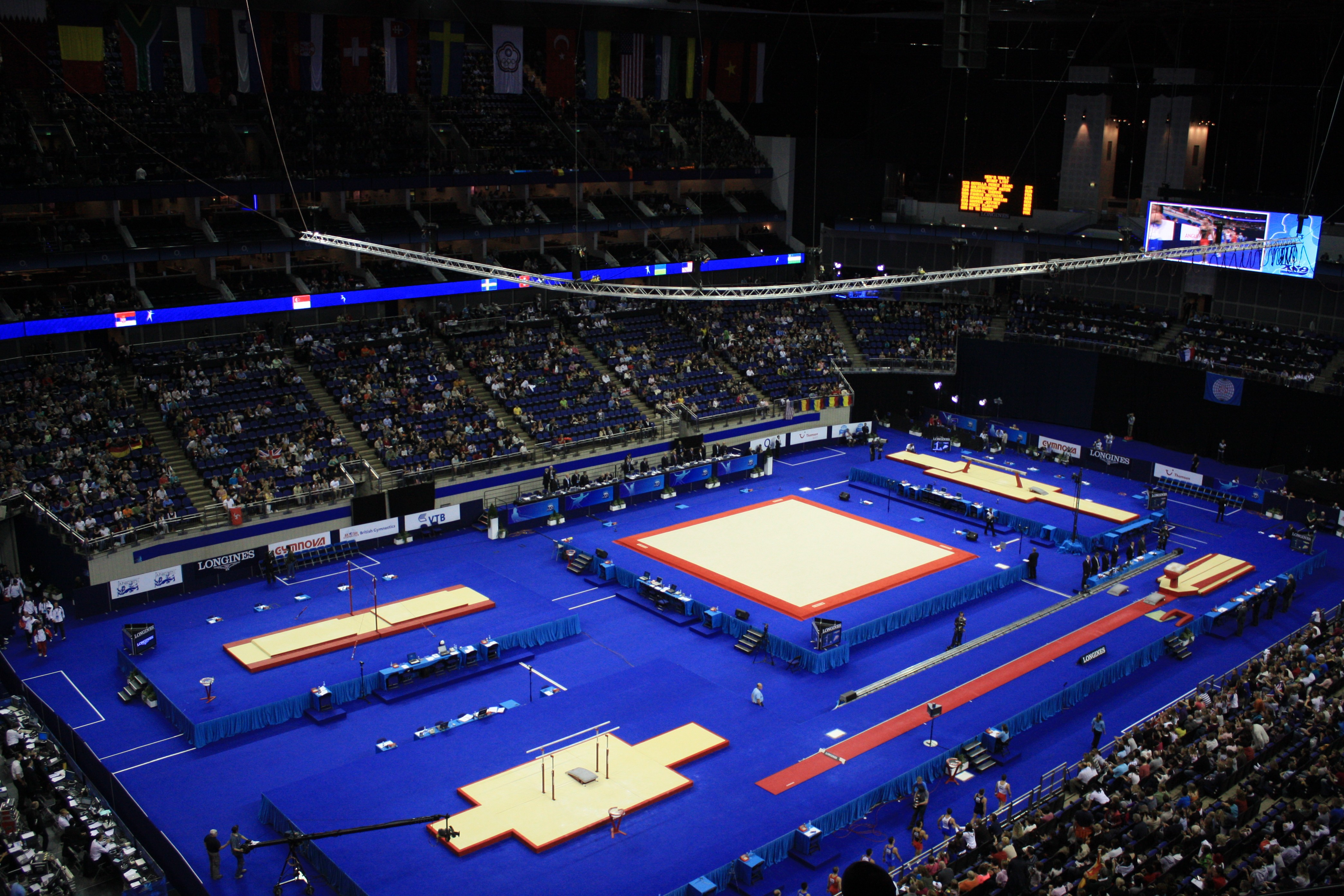
- North Greenwich Arena
- Venue: North Greenwich Arena
- Date: 3 August
- Competitors: 16 from 13 nations

Medalists
1st place, gold medalist(s)		Dong Dong	China
2nd place, silver medalist(s)		Dmitry Ushakov	Russia
3rd place, bronze medalist(s)		Lu Chunlong	China

The men's trampoline competition at the 2012 Summer Olympics was held at the North Greenwich Arena on 3 August.

== Competition format ==
In the qualification round, each gymnast performed two routines: compulsory and voluntary. Scores for the two were summed, and the top eight competitors moved on to the final. In the final, each gymnast performed a single routine, with qualification scores not carrying over.

== Qualification results ==
Position	Athlete	Country	Compulsory	Voluntary	Penalty	Total	Notes
1	Dong Dong	China	51.160	61.735		112.895	Q
2	Dmitry Ushakov	Russia	50.705	61.900		112.605	Q
3	Lu Chunlong	China	51.064	61.235		112.299	Q
4	Masaki Ito	Japan	49.990	59.820		109.810	Q
5	Yasuhiro Ueyama	Japan	49.554	60.255		109.809	Q
6	Jason Burnett	Canada	49.670	59.395		109.065	Q
7	Grégoire Pennes	France	49.770	57.769		107.539	Q
8	Nikita Fedorenko	Russia	49.865	57.205		107.070	Q
9	Henrik Stehlik	Germany	48.435	57.630		106.065	
10	Peter Jensen	Denmark	48.915	55.780		104.695	
11	Flavio Cannone	Italy	47.450	56.720		104.170	
12	Viachaslau Modzel	Belarus	47.700	56.180		103.880	
13	Blake Gaudry	Australia	49.260	34.995		84.255	
14	Yuriy Nikitin	Ukraine	48.935	30.165		79.070	
15	Diogo Ganchinho	Portugal	48.800	12.640		61.440	
16	Steven Gluckstein	United States	48.855	12.165		61.020	

== Final results ==
Position	Athlete	Difficulty	Execution	Flight	Penalty	Total	Notes
1st place, gold medalist(s)	Dong Dong (CHN)	17.800	27.100	18.090		62.990	
2nd place, silver medalist(s)	Dmitry Ushakov (RUS)	17.100	26.524	18.145		61.769	
3rd place, bronze medalist(s)	Lu Chunlong (CHN)	17.100	25.849	18.370		61.319	
4	Masaki Ito (JPN)	16.600	26.300	17.995		60.895	
5	Yasuhiro Ueyama (JPN)	16.600	25.875	17.765		60.240	
6	Nikita Fedorenko (RUS)	17.300	23.900	17.905		59.105	
7	Grégoire Pennes (FRA)	17.100	24.500	17.205		58.805	
8	Jason Burnett (CAN)	2.200	2.600	1.915		6.715	
