= Dmitry Ushakov (gymnast) =

Russian trampoline gymnast

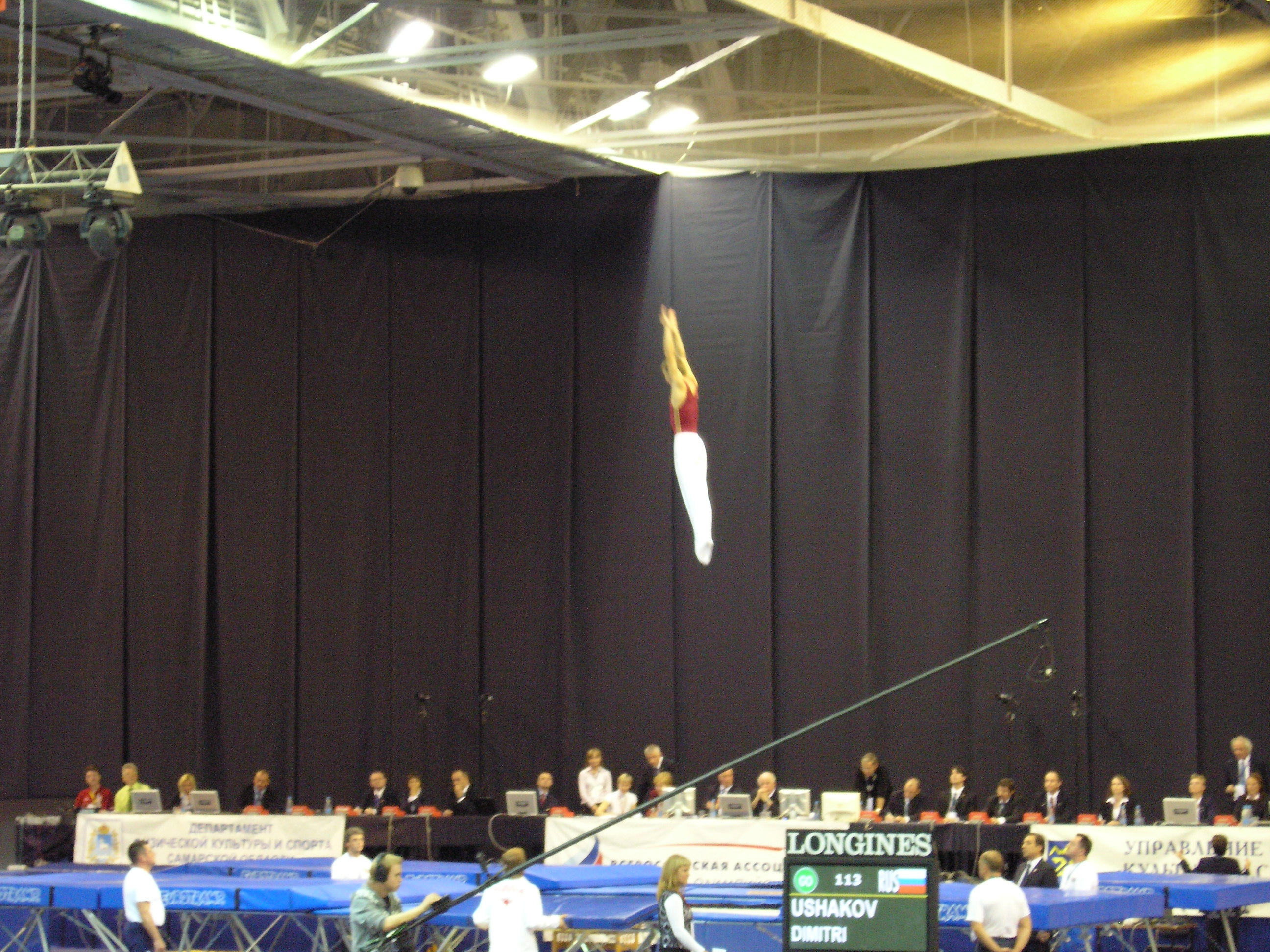
- Dmitry Ushakov

Personal information
- Full name: Dmitry Arkadyevich Ushakov
- Born: 15 August 1988 (age 38) Yeysk, Krasnodar Krai, Soviet Union
- Height: 178 cm (5 ft 10 in)

Gymnastics career
- Discipline: Trampoline gymnastics
- Country represented: Russia
- Club: Dynamo
- Head coach: Alexei Ryzhkov
- Former coach: Oleg Zaporozchenko
Medal record
Men's trampoline gymnastics
Representing Russia
Olympic Games
Silver medal – second place	2012 London	Individual
World Championships
Gold medal – first place	2015 Odense	Trampoline Team
Gold medal – first place	2019 Tokyo	All-Around Team
Silver medal – second place	2013 Sofia	Trampoline Team
Silver medal – second place	2017 Sofia	Individual
Silver medal – second place	2017 Sofia	Trampoline Team
Bronze medal – third place	2005 Eindhoven	Trampoline Team
Bronze medal – third place	2009 St. Petersburg	Trampoline Team
Bronze medal – third place	2011 Birmingham	Trampoline Team
Bronze medal – third place	2017 Sofia	Synchro
World Games
Silver medal – second place	2013 Cali	Synchro
European Games
Gold medal – first place	2015 Baku	Individual
Gold medal – first place	2015 Baku	Synchro
European Championships
Gold medal – first place	2008 Odense	Trampoline Team
Gold medal – first place	2012 St. Petersburg	Individual
Gold medal – first place	2012 St. Petersburg	Trampoline Team
Gold medal – first place	2014 Guimarães	Trampoline Team
Gold medal – first place	2016 Valladolid	Trampoline Team
Gold medal – first place	2018 Baku	Trampoline Team
Silver medal – second place	2014 Guimarães	Individual
Silver medal – second place	2016 Valladolid	Individual
Bronze medal – third place	2008 Odense	Individual
Representing RGF
World Championships
Gold medal – first place	2021 Baku	All-Around Team
Bronze medal – third place	2021 Baku	Trampoline Team

Dmitry Arkadyevich Ushakov (Russian: Дмитрий Аркадьевич Ушаков; born 15 August 1988) is a Russian trampoline gymnast. He won the silver medal at the 2012 Summer Olympics, and he also finished in the top six at the 2008, 2016, and 2020 Summer Olympics. He is the 2012 European individual champion and a five-time European team champion. He won two gold medals at the 2015 European Games. At the 2017 World Championships, he won the individual silver medal and the synchronized bronze medal.

== Gymnastics career ==
Ushakov took up the sport at the age of seven in Yeysk. From 1999 until 2016, he was coached by Oleg Zaporozhchenko. He made his international senior debut at the 2005 World Championships, where he was part of the Russian team that won the bronze medal.

Ushakov represented Russia at the 2008 Summer Olympics and advanced to the individual trampoline final, finishing seventh. At the 2009 World Championships, he qualified for the final in second place but dropped to fifth place in the final. At the 2011 World Championships, Ushakov was unable to finish his routine in the individual final and placed seventh. He did win a bronze medal in the team event.

Ushakov represented Russia at the 2012 Summer Olympics and won the silver medal in the individual trampoline final to China's Dong Dong. He won a silver medal in the synchro competition at the 2013 World Games alongside Nikita Fedorenko. Then at the 2013 World Championships, he helped Russia win the team silver medal.

Ushakov won the individual silver medal at the 2014 European Championships behind Uladzislau Hancharou, and he won a gold medal in the team event. At the 2014 World Championships, he advanced into the individual final and finished fifth. He won the individual gold medal at the 2015 European Games by less than one point ahead of Hancharou. He then competed in the synchro event with Mikhail Melnik, and they won the gold medal. He helped Russian win the team title at the 2015 World Championships.

Ushakov helped Russia win the team event at the 2016 European Championships, where he also won the individual silver medal behind Hancharou. He then represented Russia at the 2016 Summer Olympics and placed fifth in the individual final.

At the 2017 Baku World Cup, Ushakov advanced to the individual final in first place, but he only finished sixth in the final. He won the individual silver medal, behind China's Gao Lei, at the 2017 World Championships. He also competed with Andrey Yudin in the synchro competition, and they won the bronze medal. Additionally, Ushakov, Yudin, and Sergei Azarian won the team silver medal.

Ushakov won a silver medal with the Russian team at the 2018 European Championships. At the 2019 World Championships, he won a bronze medal in the trampoline team event, and he won a gold medal in the all-around team event.

Ushakov competed at the 2020 Summer Olympics, his fourth Olympics, and placed fifth in the individual final. At the 2021 World Championships, he helped the Russian Gymnastics Federation win the all-around team title.

== Awards ==
After winning the silver medal at the 2012 Summer Olympics, Ushakov was awarded the Order for Merits to the Fatherland, 1st grade.
