= Gymnastics at the 2008 Summer Olympics – Men's trampoline =

Men's trampoline at the Games of the XXIX Olympiad
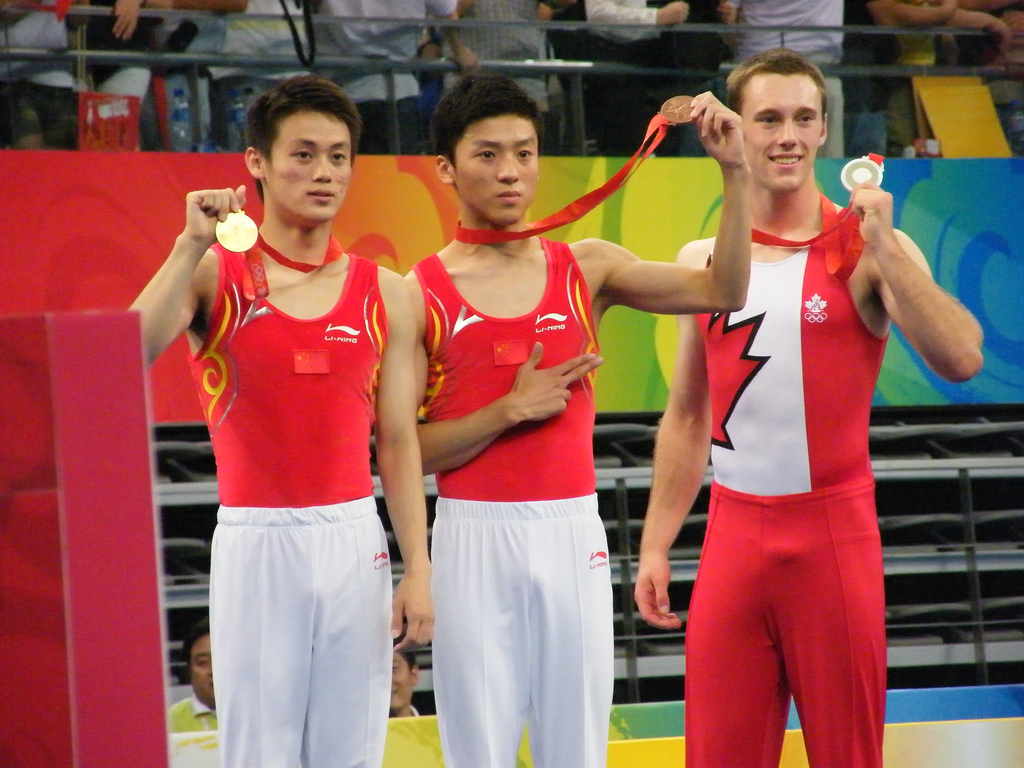
- Left to right: Lu Chunlong (gold), Dong Dong (bronze) and Jason Burnett (silver) won medals in gymnastics - Men's trampoline

Medalists
1st place, gold medalist(s)		Lu Chunlong	China
2nd place, silver medalist(s)		Jason Burnett	Canada
3rd place, bronze medalist(s)		Dong Dong	China

Men's trampoline competition at the 2008 Summer Olympics was held on 16–19 August at the Beijing National Indoor Stadium. The competition consisted of two rounds. In the first, each trampolinist performed two routines on the trampoline. One routine had to include required elements, while the other was a voluntary routine. Scores were given for both execution and difficulty in each routine, summed to give a routine score. The two routine scores in the first round determined qualification for the second; the eight top finishers moved on to the final. The final consisted entirely of a single voluntary routine, with no preliminary scores being carried over.

== Qualified competitors ==
Position	Athlete	Country	Compulsory	Voluntary	Penalty	Total	Notes
1	Lu Chunlong	China	31.20	41.20		72.40	Q
2	Dong Dong	China	31.00	40.70		71.70	Q
3	Dmitry Ushakov	Russia	30.80	40.70		71.50	Q
4	Yuriy Nikitin	Ukraine	30.60	40.10		70.70	Q
5	Tetsuya Sotomura	Japan	29.60	40.70		70.30	Q
6	Alexander Rusakov	Russia	29.90	40.00		69.90	Q
7	Jason Burnett	Canada	28.50	41.20		69.70	Q T
8	Mikalai Kazak	Belarus	30.30	39.40		69.70	Q T
9	Yasuhiro Ueyama	Japan	29.9	39.3		69.2	R T
10	Peter Jensen	Denmark	30.5	38.7		69.2	R T
11	Diogo Ganchinho	Portugal	29.8	39.3		69.1	
12	Grégoire Pennes	France	30.0	38.7		68.7	
13	Ben Wilden	Australia	28.1	39.0		67.1	
14	Flavio Cannone	Italy	29.0	37.5		66.5	
15	Chris Estrada	United States	28.5	37.4		65.9	
16	Henrik Stehlik	Germany	30.9	33.7		64.6	

- Q = Qualified for Finals
- R = Reserve
- T = Tie break

== Final ==
Position	Athlete	Execution					Difficulty	Penalty	Total	Notes
Position	Athlete	J1	J2	J3	J4	J5	Difficulty	Penalty	Total	Notes
Gold medal	Lu Chunlong (CHN)	8.3	8.2	8.1	8.3	8.3	16.2		41.00	
Silver medal	Jason Burnett (CAN)	7.9	8.0	7.9	8.0	8.1	16.8		40.70	
Bronze medal	Dong Dong (CHN)	8.2	8.2	8.0	8.0	8.3	16.2		40.60	
4	Tetsuya Sotomura (JPN)	8.0	8.1	8.1	8.0	8.1	15.6		39.80	T
5	Yuriy Nikitin (UKR)	7.8	7.9	8.0	7.9	7.8	16.2		39.80	T
6	Dmitry Ushakov (RUS)	7.7	7.6	8.0	7.4	7.5	16.0		38.80	
7	Alexander Rusakov (RUS)	7.5	7.5	7.2	7.3	7.7	16.2		38.50	
8	Mikalai Kazak (BLR)	7.1	7.2	7.4	7.6	7.5	16.0		38.10	
