= Gymnastics at the 2006 Asian Games – Men's trampoline =

Men's individual at the 2006 Asian Games
- Venue: Aspire Hall 2
- Date: 11–12 December 2006
- Competitors: 6 from 4 nations

Medalists
gold medal	Que Zhicheng	China
silver medal	Lu Chunlong	China
bronze medal	Shunsuke Nagasaki	Japan

The men's individual trampoline competition at the 2006 Asian Games in Doha, Qatar was held on 11 and 12 December 2006 at the Aspire Hall 2.

== Schedule ==
All times are Arabia Standard Time (UTC+03:00)

Date	Time	Event
Monday, 11 December 2006	17:00	Qualification
Tuesday, 12 December 2006	17:00	Final

== Results ==
=== Qualification ===
Rank	Athlete	Routine 1	Routine 2	Total
1	Lu Chunlong (CHN)	29.80	40.10	69.90
2	Que Zhicheng (CHN)	29.50	39.10	68.60
3	Shunsuke Nagasaki (JPN)	29.10	38.90	68.00
4	Yasuhiro Ueyama (JPN)	29.30	38.60	67.90
5	Saleh Al-Khadheir (KUW)	19.60	9.80	29.40
6	Faraj Al-Hamad (QAT)	24.60	2.40	27.00

=== Final ===
Rank	Athlete	Score
1st place, gold medalist(s)	Que Zhicheng (CHN)	39.50
2nd place, silver medalist(s)	Lu Chunlong (CHN)	39.10
3rd place, bronze medalist(s)	Shunsuke Nagasaki (JPN)	38.80
4	Yasuhiro Ueyama (JPN)	38.40
5	Faraj Al-Hamad (QAT)	33.30
6	Saleh Al-Khadheir (KUW)	15.40
