= Ryan Roberts (gymnast) =

American trampoline gymnast

- Born: June 12, 1992 (age 34)

Gymnastics career
- Discipline: Trampoline gymnastics
- Country represented: United States; (2010–2013)
Medal record
Men's trampoline gymnastics
Representing the United States
World Championships
Gold medal – first place	2013 Sofia	Double Mini Team
Bronze medal – third place	2011 Birmingham	Double Mini Team

Ryan Roberts (born June 12, 1992) is an American double-mini trampoline gymnast who has represented his nation at international competitions. At the 2011 Trampoline World Championships he won the bronze medal in the team double-mini event and at the 2013 Trampoline World Championships he won the gold medal in the team double-mini event.
