= Andrey Krylov (gymnast) =

Russian trampoline gymnast

- Born: November 14, 1988 (age 37)

Gymnastics career
- Discipline: Trampoline gymnastics
- Country represented: Russia
Medal record
Men's trampoline gymnastics
Representing Russia
World Championships
Gold medal – first place	2015 Odense	Tumbling Team
Gold medal – first place	2007 Quebec	Tumbling
Silver medal – second place	2011 Birmingham	Tumbling Team
Bronze medal – third place	2011 Birmingham	Tumbling
Bronze medal – third place	2010 Metz	Tumbling

Andrey Krylov (born November 14, 1988) is a Russian trampoline gymnast and was the gold medallist in men's tumbling at the 2007 Trampoline World Championships. Andrey Krylov tested positive for stimulants at the Trampoline World Cup stage in Loulé (POR), September 2012. Krylov received a twelve-month suspension, effective from October 1, 2012 through and including September 30, 2013.
