= Yang Song =

Chinese trampoline gymnast

- Born: 23 June 1989 (age 37) Yuxi, Yunnan, China

Gymnastics career
- Discipline: Trampoline gymnastics
- Country represented: China; (2009(?)-)
- Club: Fujian Province, China
- Head coach: Yang Yijie
Medal record
Men's trampoline gymnastics
Representing China
World Championships
Gold medal – first place	2015 Odense	Tumbling
Gold medal – first place	2014 Daytona Beach	Tumbling
Gold medal – first place	2011 Birmingham	Tumbling
Gold medal – first place	2011 Birmingham	Tumbling Team
Gold medal – first place	2009 St. Petersburg	Tumbling Team
Silver medal – second place	2015 Odense	Tumbling Team
Silver medal – second place	2013 Sofia	Tumbling Team
Silver medal – second place	2010 Metz	Tumbling
Silver medal – second place	2009 St. Petersburg	Tumbling

Yang Song (born 23 June 1989 in Yuxi) is a Chinese tumbling trampoline gymnast, representing his nation at international competitions. He won medals at world championships, including at the 2009, 2010, 2011, 2013, 2014 and 2015 Trampoline World Championships.

He took up gymnastics in 1995, and began trampolining in 2000 in Yunnan Province. He was named an International Elite Athlete by the General Administration of Sport of China in 2008.

In March 2018, Yang was convicted of contractual fraud and sentenced to 10 years and four months in prison.

== Personal ==
He pursued higher education at the Beijing Sport University.
