= Olexander Chernonos =

Ukrainian trampoline gymnast

- Born: 10 May 1979 (age 47) Kharkiv, Ukrainian SSR, Soviet Union

Gymnastics career
- Discipline: Trampoline gymnastics
- Country represented: Ukraine
Medal record
Representing Ukraine
World Championships
Silver medal – second place	2001 Odense	Individual
Bronze medal – third place	2009 Saint Petersburg	Synchro
Bronze medal – third place	2003 Hannover	Team
Bronze medal – third place	1999 Sun City	Synchro
Bronze medal – third place	1998 Sydney	Synchro
European Championships
Gold medal – first place	2004 Sofia	Synchro
Bronze medal – third place	2008 Odense	Synchro

Olexander Chernonos (Ukrainian: Олександр Васильович Чернонос, born 10 May 1979) is a Ukrainian retired gymnast and Olympic athlete. He competed in the inaugural trampolining event at the 2000 Summer Olympics in Sydney where he finished 8th. He is European champion and World championships medallist in synchro trampoline as well as Worlds silver medallist in individual trampolining. Together with Yuri Nikitin, he finished 5th in the synchro event at the 2009 World Games in Kaohsiung. After the retirement, he has been working as a coach at a sports school in Kharkiv and serving as member of NOC's regional office.
