= Lu Chunlong =

Chinese trampoline gymnast

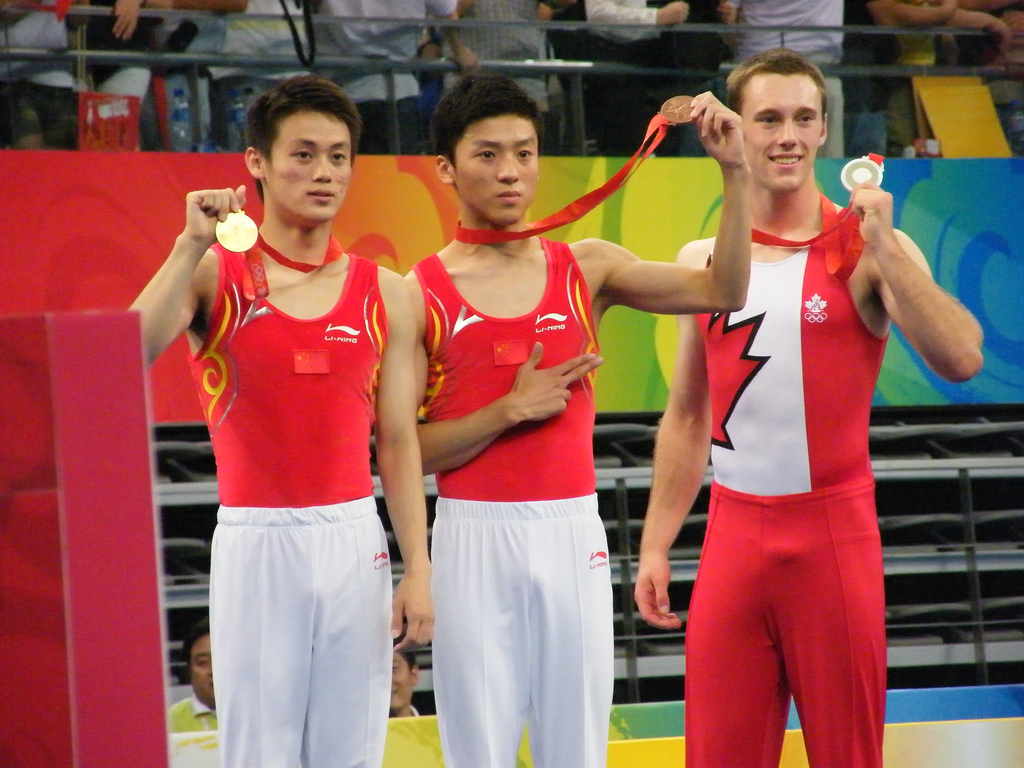
- Chunlong (left) at the awards ceremony for the Olympic Trampoline event in Beijing.

Personal information
- Born: April 8, 1989 (age 37) Jiangyin, Jiangsu
- Height: 170 cm (5 ft 7 in)

Gymnastics career
- Discipline: Trampoline gymnastics
- Country represented: China
- Head coach: Hu Xing Gang
Medal record
Men's trampoline gymnastics
Representing China
Olympic Games
Gold medal – first place	2008 Beijing	Individual
Bronze medal – third place	2012 London	Individual
World Championships
Gold medal – first place	2007 Quebec	Team
Gold medal – first place	2009 St Petersburg	Team
Gold medal – first place	2011 Birmingham	Individual
Silver medal – second place	2009 St Petersburg	Individual
Silver medal – second place	2011 Birmingham	Team
Asian Games
Silver medal – second place	2006 Doha	Individual

Lu Chunlong (simplified Chinese: 陆春龙; traditional Chinese: 陸春龍; pinyin: Lù Chūnlóng; born April 8, 1989, in Jiangyin, Jiangsu) is a male Chinese trampoline gymnast who competed in the 2008 Summer Olympics where he won the gold medal. Four years later, at the 2012 London Olympics, Lu won the bronze medal while Dong Dong, the bronze medalist from Beijing, won the competition.
