= Rea Lenders =

Dutch trampoline gymnast

Andrea Lenders
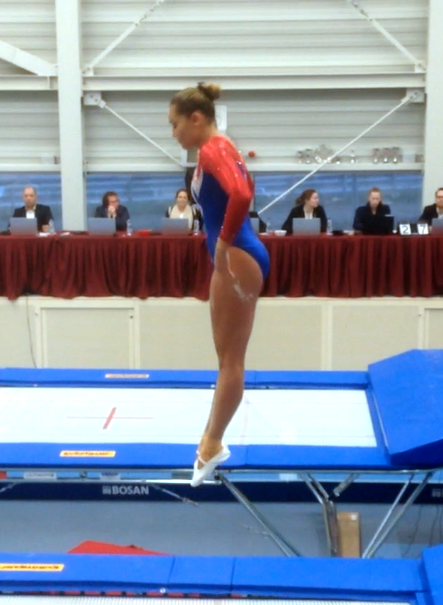

Personal information
- Full name: Andrea Augusta Gemma "Rea" Lenders
- Alternative name: Rea Lenders
- Born: 29 December 1980 (age 45) Groningen, Netherlands
- Height: 166 cm (5 ft 5 in)

Gymnastics career
- Discipline: Trampoline gymnastics
- Country represented: Netherlands

Andrea Augusta Gemma "Rea" Lenders (born 29 December 1980) is a former individual trampoline gymnast from the Netherlands. She competed at both the 2004 and 2012 Summer Olympics and was a ten-time Dutch national champion.

== Career ==
Lenders was discovered by a coach at age 6. She won ten Dutch national titles during her career.

Lenders competed in the women's trampoline event at the 2004 Summer Olympics. After finishing in 8th place in the qualification round, she also finished in 8th position in the final. She was the first Dutch women to compete in the trampoline event at the Olympic Games.

At the 2005 World Championships, she placed 4th. However, she missed qualifying for the 2008 Summer Olympics after she placed 25th at the 2007 World Championships.

Lenders finished 15th in qualifications at the 2010 World Championships. Afterward, she suffered a series of injuries that kept her from training for about a year. She only started training again shortly before the 2011 World Championships. There she finished 22nd in qualifications.

In January 2012, Lenders competed at the 2012 Gymnastics Olympic Test Event in hopes of earning one of the six available quotas. She joked that she was not bothered by competing as the 13th competitor at 13:00 on a Friday the 13th. She won the silver medal in the final with the highest execution score.

At the 2012 Summer Olympics, she finished 13th in the qualification and did not qualify for the final. Lenders expressed disappointment over her performance.

Lenders continued training. After the end of 2015, ahead of the 2016 European Championships, she coached herself as she could no longer afford to pay her coach. She finished in 47th place in qualifications.

== Personal life ==
Lenders's parents both died within six months of each other before 2016. She considered halting her competitive career at the time but ultimately decided to continue.
