= Zita Frydrychová =

Czech trampoline gymnast

- Born: 3 December 1991 (age 34) Liberec, Czechoslovakia
- Height: 162 cm (5 ft 4 in)

Gymnastics career
- Discipline: Trampoline gymnastics
- Country represented: Czech Republic

Zita Frydrychová (born 3 December 1991) is a trampoline gymnast from the Czech Republic.

Zita competed in the women's trampoline event at the 2012 Summer Olympics where she finished in 15th place.

She has also competed at 8 World Championships (2010, 2011, 2013, 2014, 2015, 2017, 2018 and 2019), and competed at the 2018 European Championships.

Born in Liberec, she was named 2012 Liberec Sportsperson of the Year, and in 2018, was named Czech Trampolinist of the Year.
