= Nathan Bailey (gymnast) =

British trampoline gymnast (born 1993)

Personal information
- Nationality: British
- Born: 24 July 1993 (age 32)
- Height: 178 cm (5 ft 10 in)
- Weight: 71 kg (157 lb)

Sport
- Sport: Trampolining
- Club: OLGA Trampoline and Gymnastics
- Coached by: Brian Camp and Nigel Rendell
Medal record
Men's trampoline gymnastics
Representing Great Britain
World Championships
Silver medal – second place	2017 Sofia	Synchro
European Championships
Bronze medal – third place	2016 Valladolid	Individual

Nathan Bailey (born 24 July 1993) is a British trampoline gymnast. He competed in the trampoline competition at the 2016 Summer Olympics, where he finished in 9th place.

== Early life ==
Nathan Bailey was born in 1993 in Bournemouth, England. Bailey was introduced to gymnastics as a toddler and began training at the Ringwood and Bournemouth Trampoline Club when he was six. At the age of 14, he joined the OLGA Trampoline and Gymnastics Club in Poole. At the same age, he broke both of his arms before recovering.

== Career ==
Bailey won the British trampoline title in 2016 and won bronze in the European Championships in Valladolid, Spain, the same year.

Bailey came 17th at the 2015 Trampoline, Tumbling & DMT World Championships in Denmark, qualifying for the Trampoline Gymnastics Olympic Test Event, held in Rio de Janeiro in April 2016. At the Test Event, he scored 104.695 points and qualified for the 2016 Summer Olympic Games. He was selected for the final at the Olympics and finished in 9th place.

Bailey won silver at the FIG trampoline World Cup in Minsk in August 2017, scoring 59.165. He also came fifth in the synchronized event at the same competition, alongside Luke Strong.

Bailey and Luke Strong won gold in the synchronised event at the 2017 trampoline World Cup in Valladolid, scoring 52.250 points. At the 2017 Trampoline World Championships in Sofia, Bulgaria, he won silver alongside Strong, again scoring 52.250 points.

At the 2018 Trampoline British Championships, Bailey scored 162.860 and won silver. He was named in the British team for the 2019 Trampoline World Championships, but withdrew due to injury. Bailey retired from gymnastics in January 2020.
