= Mariah Madigan =

Canadian trampoline gymnast

- Born: 16 December 1993 (age 32)

Gymnastics career
- Discipline: Trampoline gymnastics
- Country represented: Canada (2005-2013)
- Club: Skyriders Trampoline Place
- Head coach: Dave Ross
Medal record
Women's trampoline gymnastics
Representing Canada
World Championships
Gold medal – first place	2011 Birmingham	Double Mini Team

Mariah Madigan (born 16 December 1993) is a Canadian retired individual and double-mini trampoline gymnast who competed at the international level.

Madigan competed at the world championships, including at the 2010 and 2011 Trampoline World Championships. At the 2011 world championships she won the bronze medal in the team event and the gold medal in the double-mini team event.

Madigan began trampolining at age 10, becoming a member of the Skyriders Trampoline Place in Richmond Hill, Ontario, coached by Dave Ross. Madigan attended her first World Age Group Competition in Eindhoven, Netherlands in 2005 where she placed 13th in both the individual and double-mini trampoline events. At the 2007 World Age Group Competitions in Quebec City, Madigan won a bronze medal in the synchronized trampoline event. At the 2009 World Age Group Championships in St. Petersburg, Russia, Madigan won the gold medal in synchronized trampoline, and the silver medal in the individual trampoline event, missing the gold medal by only two-tenths of a point.

Between 2005 and 2010, Madigan was Junior National Champion ten times, and at the 2009 Canada Cup in Hamilton, Ontario became the first Canadian Junior Woman to perform a triple in competition.

In 2010, Madigan qualified as the only women's trampoline representative from Canada to attend the Inaugural Youth Olympic Games in Singapore, where she placed 4th.

After the 2010 Youth Olympics, Madigan moved from the junior to the senior international level in individual trampoline. She competed at her first senior event in Spain, where she placed 9th in the individual trampoline and earned a bronze medal in synchronized trampoline.

In 2010, at Madigan's first Senior World Championships in Metz, France, she was the youngest athlete on Team Canada. She was chosen as its flag bearer. She competed in individual trampoline, placing 22nd. The following week, Madigan competed in double-mini trampoline at the World Age Group Competitions, where she won the silver medal.

In 2011, Madigan became a two-time World Cup champion. She first won the synchronized trampoline event at World Cup in Germany with her partner, Rosannagh MacLennan. Madagan then competed at the Japan World Cup with Karen Cockburn. making the final and placing 7th in individual trampoline.

At the 2011 Trampoline World Championships in Birmingham, England, Madigan contributed the highest scoring pass to her team score in the double-mini trampoline team event where Canada won the gold medal. She was also on the bronze medal-winning trampoline team.

In January 2012, Madigan suffered a severe wrist injury while taking a trampoline coaching course. The injury required multiple surgeries and a long recuperation time. In June 2012, Madigan graduated from Bill Crothers Secondary School and went to York University.

After being away from competition for almost three years, Madigan competed at the 2015 Canada Cup in Kamloops, British Columbia, where she placed 4th. After the Canada Cup, Madigan retired from trampoline to spend more time on her academic studies and pursuing her goal of becoming a doctor.
