= He Wenna =

Chinese trampoline gymnast

- 何雯娜
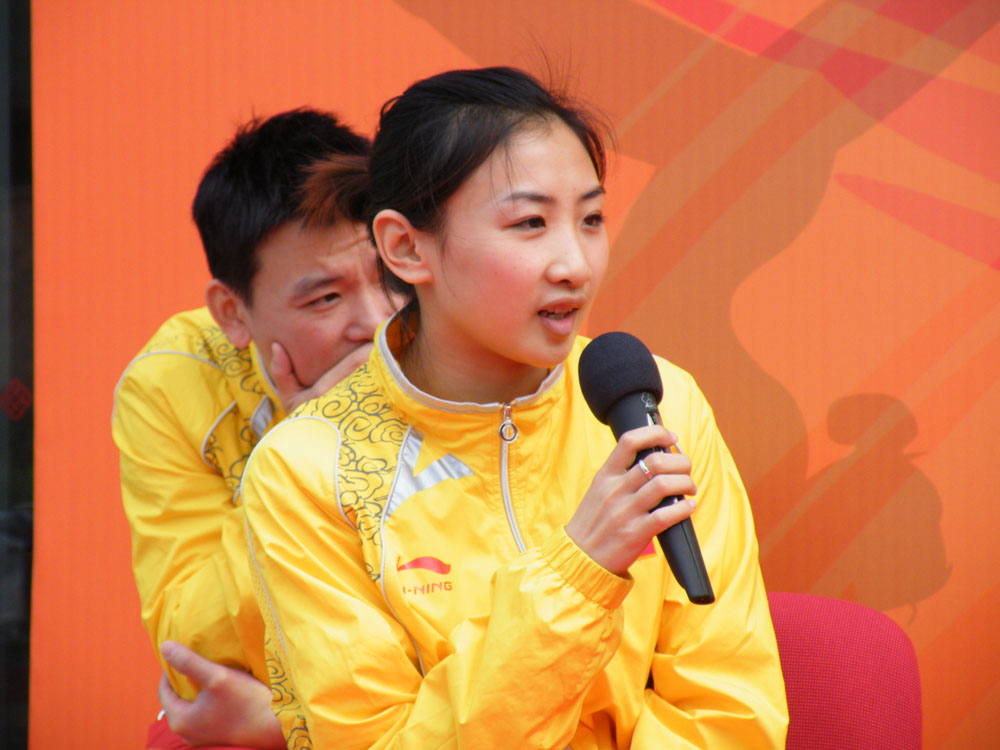
- He Wenna during an official visit to the Hong Kong Polytechnic University in November 2008

Personal information
- Born: 19 January 1989 (age 37) Xinluo, Longyan, Fujian
- Height: 160 cm (5 ft 3 in)

Gymnastics career
- Discipline: Trampoline gymnastics
- Country represented: China
- Head coach: Hu Xin Gang
Medal record
Women's trampoline gymnastics
Representing China
Olympic Games
Gold medal – first place	2008 Beijing	Individual
Bronze medal – third place	2012 London	Individual
World Championships
Gold medal – first place	2007 Quebec	Team
Gold medal – first place	2009 St. Petersburg	Team
Gold medal – first place	2011 Birmingham	Team
Gold medal – first place	2011 Birmingham	Individual
Gold medal – first place	2015 Odense	Team
Silver medal – second place	2009 St. Petersburg	Individual
Asian Games
Silver medal – second place	2010 Guangzhou	Individual

He Wenna (Chinese: 何雯娜; pinyin: Hé Wénnà; born 19 January 1989) is a Chinese former trampoline gymnast. She is the 2008 Olympic champion and the 2012 Olympic bronze medalist. She is also the 2011 World champion and the 2010 Asian Games silver medalist. Additionally, she won three team titles at the World Championships. She competed at the 2016 Summer Olympics and finished fourth.

== Gymnastics career ==
He began trampoline gymnastics when she was 10 years old and began competing internationally for China in 2006. She competed at the 2007 World Championships and finished fourth in the individual final. She did win a gold medal in the team competition. At the 2008 Summer Olympics, she won the gold medal by 0.800 points ahead of Karen Cockburn.

He helped China defend its team title at the 2009 World Championships. She qualified for the individual final in first place but ultimately won the silver medal to teammate Huang Shanshan by 0.100 points. She also finished second to Huang at the 2010 Asian Games. At the 2010 World Championships, she finished third in the individual qualifications but did not advance into the final due to the two-per-county rule, as Huang and Li Dan scored higher than her. She went on to win the individual title at the 2011 World Championships.

He represented China at the 2012 Summer Olympics and qualified for the final in first place. In the final, she won the bronze medal, behind Rosie MacLennan and Huang, after falling on the final skill in her routine. She missed most of the 2013 and 2014 seasons due to a foot injury. She competed with the Chinese team that won the gold medal at the 2015 World Championships.

He represented China at the 2016 Summer Olympics and finished fourth in the final. She announced her retirement after the competition ended.
