= Oscar Smith (gymnast) =

Swedish trampoline gymnast

- Full name: Anton Oscar Smith
- Born: 6 May 1991 (age 35) Lidköping, Sweden
- Height: 175 cm (5 ft 9 in)

Gymnastics career
- Discipline: Trampoline gymnastics
- Country represented: Sweden (2007-)
- Club: TK Levo, Lidköping
- Head coach: Per Holgersson (club)

Anton Oscar Smith (born 6 May 1991 in Lidköping) is a Swedish trampolinist, representing his nation at international competitions.

Born in Lidköping, Sweden, he took up gymnastics in 2004. Smith is a member of the national team since 2007 and made his international debut in 2009. He competed at world championships, including at the 2010, 2011, 2014 and 2015 Trampoline World Championships. He won the 2015 Swedish Championships.

His career was paused for a year by a double heel fracture incurred while training in 2016, and he was also reportedly "troubled by an injury ahead of the 2017 World Championships". A head injury resulting in a concussion prevented him from competing in the 2019 World Cup in Valladolid, Spain.
