= Alexander Rusakov =

Russian Olympic trampoline gymnast

- Born: December 31, 1980 (age 45) Russian Federation

Gymnastics career
- Discipline: Trampoline gymnastics
- Country represented: Russia

Alexander Rusakov (born December 31, 1980) is a Russian trampoline gymnast who made his Olympic debut at the 2004 Summer Olympics, finishing in fifth place in the men's individual competition. He also competed at the 2008 Summer Olympics.
