= Tu Xiao =

Chinese trampoline gymnast

- Born: 19 August 1988 (age 38)

Gymnastics career
- Discipline: Trampoline gymnastics
- Country represented: China; (2009-)
Medal record
Men's trampoline gymnastics
Representing China
World Games
Gold medal – first place	2017 Wrocław	Synchro
World Championships
Gold medal – first place	2018 St. Petersburg	All-around Team
Gold medal – first place	2017 Sofia	Team
Gold medal – first place	2015 Odense	Synchro
Gold medal – first place	2014 Daytona Beach	Individual
Gold medal – first place	2014 Daytona Beach	Synchro
Gold medal – first place	2013 Sofia	Team
Gold medal – first place	2011 Birmingham	Synchro
Gold medal – first place	2010 Metz	Synchro
Silver medal – second place	2015 Odense	Team
Silver medal – second place	2013 Sofia	Individual
Silver medal – second place	2011 Birmingham	Team
Asian Games
Silver medal – second place	2014 Incheon	Individual
Silver medal – second place	2010 Guangzhou	Individual

Tu Xiao (Chinese: 涂潇, born 19 August 1988) is a Chinese individual and synchronised trampoline gymnast, representing his nation at international competitions. He won the gold medal at the 2014 World Trampoline Gymnastics Championships in Sofia and silver medal in the 2014 Asian Games at Incheon, South Korea. In 2015, he ranked 2 in the Gymnastics - Trampoline World Ranking. He also competed at world championships, including at the 2015 Trampoline World Championships.

In 2017, he won the gold medal in Men's Synchro at The World Games 2017 in Wrocław, Poland.
