= Giovanna Venetiglio Matheus =

Brazilian trampoline gymnast

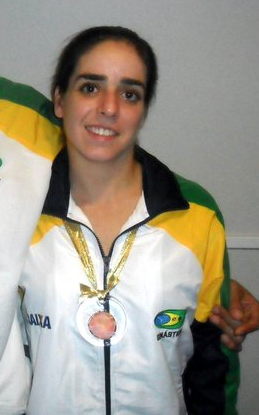
- Giovanna at the 2011 Trampoline World Cup in Kawasaki, Japan

Personal information
- Full name: Giovanna Venetiglio Bastos Matheus
- Born: December 3, 1989 (age 36) Rio de Janeiro, Brazil

Gymnastics career
- Discipline: Trampoline gymnastics
- Country represented: Brazil
- Head coach: Tatiana Figueiredo
Medal record
Representing Brazil
Pan American Games
Bronze medal – third place	2007 Rio de Janeiro	Individual

Giovanna Venetiglio Matheus (born December 3, 1989) is a retired Brazilian trampoline gymnast. She won a bronze medal in individual trampoline at the 2007 Pan-American Games held in her hometown, Rio de Janeiro. She also won a bronze medal at the Kawasaki stage of the 2011 Trampoline World Cup series in Japan in the same event. Giovanna was part of the Brazilian delegation competing in the 2011 Pan American Games held in Guadalajara, Mexico, placing fifth.
