= Savannah Vinsant =

American trampoline gymnast

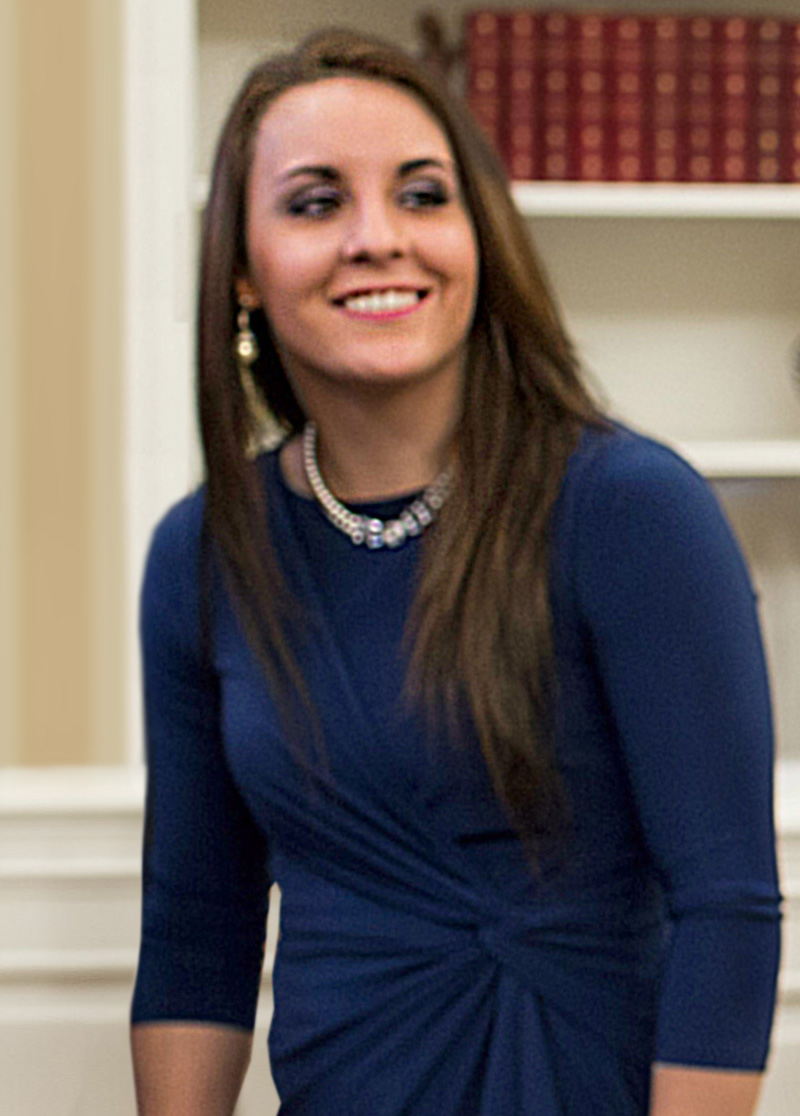
- Vinsant at the White House, 2012

Personal information
- Nickname: Bannie
- Born: June 25, 1993 (age 33) Lafayette, Louisiana, U.S.
- Height: 5 ft 3 in (160 cm)

Gymnastics career
- Discipline: Trampoline gymnastics
- Country represented: United States
- Club: Trampoline and Tumbling Express
- Head coaches: Tara Guidry, Dmitri Poliaroush
Medal record
Women's trampoline gymnastics
Representing the United States
Pacific Rim Championships
Silver medal – second place	2012 Everett	Synchro
Bronze medal – third place	2012 Everett	Team

Savannah Vinsant (born June 25, 1993) is an American trampoline gymnast. She competed at the first Summer Youth Olympic Games. Vinsant also represented the United States at the 2012 Summer Olympics. She became the first ever U.S. trampoline athlete to qualify for the finals. Savannah finished sixth place during the trampoline finals. She was the youngest female trampoline competitor at the games. She was inducted into the USA Gymnastics Hall of Fame as a member of the class of 2024.

== Early life ==
Vinsant's parents are Neil and Ramonda Vinsant. Savannah Vinsant began gymnastics in 2000. She had always lived in cities that had trampoline gyms. However, when her family moved, in 2005, to Newton that changed. Her family drove her a constant back-and-forth trips to practices in Orange and Lafayette until it became too much. It seemed as though at this point Vinsant's trampoline career would likely end, just shortly after it had started. "We didn't think she was going to bounce again," said her father. Savannah made it quite clear that she was not going to take giving up the sport quietly. "I hate y'all. I hate y'all for making me quit," Ramonda recalled Savannah telling her during one heated argument. The parents, who had taken courses in judging and coaching, began training Savannah on their own. They trained her on a 7-by-14-foot competition trampoline (a rectangular trampoline with a different bed than regular outdoor trampolines) – in their backyard. Soon roughly 40 children began coming to Savannah's house and joined her with her practices. Her parents then offered to build a gym in their front yard.

In 2007, Vinsant filled out an application to attend the U.S. Olympic Training Center without her parents' permission. She called her mother from Newton High School and told her she was sick and her parents would need to get her now. Her mother took her home from school, where the then 14-year-old Savannah received a call from the Olympic Training Center saying she was a few years too young to attend. Vinsant lived in Newton from the time she was 10 until one month before her 16th birthday, when she left home to train for the Olympics.

The gym now is the headquarters for more than 200 aspiring trampolinists.

== Journey to the Olympics ==
=== London qualification ===
On November 21, 2011 in Birmingham, United Kingdom, Vinsant finished tenth at the 2011 World Trampoline and Tumbling Championships with a score of 98.445. With her performance, she advanced to the women's individual trampoline final and secured a spot for the U.S. team at the next summer's 2012 Olympic Games in London.

Although Vinsant's scores qualified the United States for an Olympic spot, she still had to compete in a series of qualification competitions to earn her place to represent the United States at the Olympics. Savannah won all three of the qualification competitions securing her spot easily. "I'm speechless – I have no words for it", was her reaction upon being named to the Olympic team, "I'm filled with joy and I'm at peace that it's over. I had a big group of girls out there with me this year who were awesome, and they definitely kept me on my toes all year. I'm honored to be representing Team USA."

=== London 2012 ===
Vinsant competed on August 4, 2012 at the London Olympics. She was the youngest competitor of the female field. In the compulsory round, she scored a 46.400 for her routine that included a half in Rudy out and would be standing in 11th place. However, Vinsant's second routine, her optional routine, would score a 54.955, which moved her to seventh place in the prelims with a total score of 101.355. This would grant her one of the eight places in the finals competition on the same day. Vinsant became the first U.S. trampolinist to qualify to the finals at an Olympic Games. "I wanted to make finals, but overall I just wanted to do 20 skills," she said. "Making it to finals in seventh, I was shocked actually– I thought that was a pretty high standard for me to reach."

During the finals portion of the competition, Vinsant's routine featured a Triffus tuck, half Rudi tuck, full in Rudi out straight, double back pike, Rudi out pike, half in half out pike, full Brani pike, half half tuck, half out pike and full full pike. She scored a 54.965 and finished sixth.

Vinsant said of her overall performance in London, "I was very pleased with all of my performances today. This gives me a lot of confidence. I was the youngest competitor here and making finals really hit the pace for me. I will work to get my difficulty, time of flight and execution better so that I can be up in the medals at the next Olympics."

== Accomplishments ==
=== Business ===
- In 2015, Savannah Vinsant Thompson launched Hangtime TNT Gymnastics, LLC., a trampoline and tumbling gymnastics club and cheerleading academy. In 2017, Coach Savannah's team had their first national champion and regional champions. All 2017 Hangtime TNT athletes became a State Champion in one of the three trampoline and tumbling events at the State Championships held in Lafayette, LA. Savannah is also very proud of her recreational program as it has grown and became very successful. She is able to give children something they will never forget at Hangtime TNT. Hangtime TNT is more than a gym, it is an experience children will remember forever. Savannah's dream was to own her own gym and become a positive role model for the youth.

=== School ===
- 2014 SLCC Associate of General Studies Degree
- 2007 Student of the Year
- Class of 2010 Valedictorian

=== Trampoline ===
==== National results ====
- 2018 USA Gymnastics Trampoline Championships, Greensboro, North Carolina - 1st- TR
- 2013 U.S. T&T Championships, Kansas City, Missouri. - 4th-TR
- 2013 U.S. Elite Challenge, Frisco, Texas - 1st-TR; 2nd-SY
- 2012 USA Gymnastics Trampoline Championships, San Jose, California – 1st-TR
- 2012 Stars & Stripes Cup, Cleveland, Ohio – 1st-TR
- 2012 Elite Challenge, Tulsa, Oklahoma – 1st-TR; 2nd-SY
- 2011 U.S. Elite Championships, San Antonio, Texas – 1st-TR
- 2011 U.S. Elite Challenge, Fort Worth, Texas – 1st-SY; 6th-TR
- 2011 Winter Classic, Houston, Texas – 8th-TR
- 2010 Visa Championships, Hartford, Connecticut – 6th-TR
- 2010 U.S. Elite Challenge, Virginia Beach, Virginia – 3rd-TR
- 2010 Fairland Classic, Laurel, Maryland – 1st-TR
- 2009 Final Selection Event, Las Vegas, Nevada – 1st-TR, SY (15–16) (Jr. Div.)
- 2009 Visa Championships, Dallas, Texas – 2nd-TR; 6th-SY (Jr. Div.)
- 2009 U.S. Elite Challenge, Ft. Smith, Arkansas – 1st-TR; 2nd-SY (Jr. Div.)
- 2009 Winter Classic, Birmingham, Alabama – 3rd-TR; 6th-SY (Jr. Div.)
- 2008 Stars and Stripes Cup, Colorado Springs, Colorado – 2nd-SY; 5th-TR (Jr. Div.)
- 2008 Visa Championships, Houston, Texas – 1st-TR; 2nd-SY (Jr. Div.)
- 2008 U.S. Elite Challenge, Mobile, Alabama – 1st-TR, SY (Jr. Div.)

==== International results ====
- 2013 Aalsmeer Flower Cup, Aalsmeer, Netherlands - 2nd-TR
- 2012 Olympic Games, London, United Kingdom – 6th-TR
- 2012 Taiyuan World Cup, Taiyuan, China – 3rd-TR
- 2012 Kellogg's Pacific Rim Championships, Everett, United States – 2nd-SY; 3rd-Team; 8th-TR
- 2011 World Championships, Birmingham, United Kingdom – 4th-TR (Team); 7th-TR
- 2011 Loule Cup, Loule, Portugal – 8th-TR
- 2011 Salzgitter World Cup, Salzgitter, Germany – 5th-SY; 8th-TR
- 2011 Canada Cup, Alberta, Canada – 5th-TR, SY
- 2011 Flower Cup, Aalsmeer, Netherlands – 1st-TR
- 2010 Pan American Cup, Guadalajara, Mexico –
- 2010 World Championships, Metz, France –
- 2010 Youth Olympic Games, Singapore – 5th-TR
- 2009 World Championships, St. Petersburg, Russia – 1st-TR (15–16)
- 2009 Canada Cup, Okotoks, Canada – 1st-SY; 2nd-TR (Jr. Div.)
- 2007 World Age Group Competition, Quebec City, Canada – 2nd-TR (13–14) (Jr. Div.)
- 2005 International Age Group Competition, Eindhoven, Netherlands – 1st-TR; 5th-DM, SY (11–12) (Jr. Div.)
