= Nikita Fedorenko =

Russian trampoline gymnast

- Born: 6 September 1991 (age 35)

Gymnastics career
- Discipline: Trampoline gymnastics
- Country represented: Russia
Medal record
Men's trampoline gymnastics
Representing RGF
World Championships
Bronze medal – third place	2021 Baku	Individual Team
Representing Russia
World Championships
Bronze medal – third place	2019 Tokyo	Individual Team

Nikita Fedorenko (born 6 September 1991) is a Russian trampoline gymnast. He represented Russia at the 2012 Summer Olympics in the men's trampoline event. He finished in 6th place in the final.

In 2009, he competed in the men's synchronized trampoline at the World Games held in Kaohsiung, Taiwan.
