= Dong Dong =

Chinese trampoline gymnast

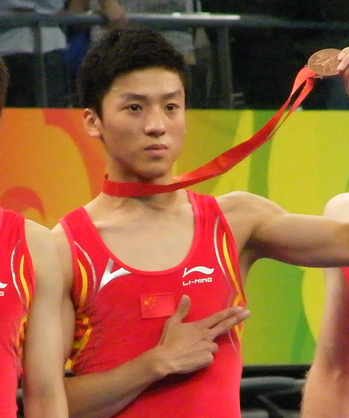
- Dong at the awards ceremony for the Olympic Trampoline in Beijing.

Personal information
- Born: April 13, 1989 (age 37) Zhengzhou, Henan
- Height: 167 cm (5 ft 6 in)

Gymnastics career
- Discipline: Trampoline gymnastics
- Country represented: China
- Head coach: Cai Guang Liang
- Assistant coach: Wang Ying
Medal record
Men's trampoline gymnastics
Representing China
Olympic Games
Gold medal – first place	2012 London	Individual
Silver medal – second place	2016 Rio de Janeiro	Individual
Silver medal – second place	2020 Tokyo	Individual
Bronze medal – third place	2008 Beijing	Individual
World Games
Gold medal – first place	2013 Cali	Synchro
Gold medal – first place	2017 Wrocław	Synchro
World Championships
Gold medal – first place	2007 Quebec	Team
Gold medal – first place	2009 St. Petersburg	Individual
Gold medal – first place	2009 St. Petersburg	Team
Gold medal – first place	2010 Metz	Individual
Gold medal – first place	2010 Metz	Synchro
Gold medal – first place	2011 Birmingham	Synchro
Gold medal – first place	2013 Sofia	Individual
Gold medal – first place	2013 Sofia	Team
Gold medal – first place	2014 Daytona Beach	Synchro
Gold medal – first place	2015 Odense	Synchro
Gold medal – first place	2017 Sofia	Team
Gold medal – first place	2018 St. Petersburg	All-around Team
Silver medal – second place	2007 Quebec	Individual
Silver medal – second place	2011 Birmingham	Individual
Silver medal – second place	2011 Birmingham	Team
Silver medal – second place	2014 Daytona Beach	Individual
Silver medal – second place	2015 Odense	Team
Silver medal – second place	2018 St. Petersburg	Individual
Silver medal – second place	2019 Tokyo	Team
Bronze medal – third place	2017 Sofia	Individual
Bronze medal – third place	2019 Tokyo	Individual
Asian Games
Gold medal – first place	2010 Guangzhou	Individual
Gold medal – first place	2014 Incheon	Individual
Gold medal – first place	2018 Jakarta	Individual

Dong Dong (Chinese: 董栋; pinyin: Dǒng Dòng; born April 13, 1989, in Zhengzhou, Henan) is a Chinese trampoline gymnast. He is an Olympic champion and four-time medalist, winning gold at London 2012, silver at Rio 2016 and Tokyo 2020, and bronze at Beijing 2008. Between 2007 and 2014, he made the podium at every World Championships and Olympics.

== Career ==
=== 2005–2008 ===
Dong was called up to the Chinese national team in 2005, and made his international debut in 2006.

At the 2007 World Championships in Quebec City, Dong came in second in the individual event and won gold in the team event.

At the 2008 Summer Olympics, he won the bronze medal in the individual event, the only trampoline event at the Olympics. His final score was 40.600.

=== 2009–2012 ===
He won the 2009 World Championships Individual Championship at St. Petersburg, Russia. Team China successfully defended their crown to a consecutive gold medal.

At the 2012 Summer Olympics, he won the gold medal with a score of 62.990.

=== 2013–2016 ===
At the 2015 World Championships, he won his 10th career World Championship gold medal by winning the synchro event with Tu Xiao.

At the 2016 Summer Olympics, he won the silver medal with a score of 60.535.

=== 2017–present ===
In 2017, he won a gold medal in men's synchro at The World Games 2017 in Wrocław, Poland.

In 2018, he was first individually and in synchro at the Brescia World Cup. At the Maebashi World Cup, he was first in synchro; at the Loule World Cup he was fourth individually and fifth in synchro. At the 2018 World Championships, he won individual silver with a score of 61.185. He ranked fifth in men's synchro and first in the team all-around.

At the 2019 Baku World Cup, Dong was second individually. At the World Championships he won individual bronze and team silver.

At the 2020 Baku World Cup, Dong won individual bronze.

In 2021, he won the silver medal in the men's trampoline event at the 2020 Summer Olympics in Tokyo, Japan.
