= Diogo Ganchinho =

Portuguese trampoline gymnast

- Born: 12 September 1987 (age 38)

Gymnastics career
- Discipline: Trampoline gymnastics
- Country represented: Portugal (2006 - 2022)
- Retired: 2022
Medal record
Men's trampoline gymnastics
Representing Portugal
World Championships
Silver medal – second place	2018 St. Petersburg	Team All-Around
European Games
Bronze medal – third place	2019 Minsk	Individual
European Championships
Gold medal – first place	2018 Baku	Individual
Silver medal – second place	2021 Sochi	Synchro
Silver medal – second place	2021 Sochi	Team

Diogo Ganchinho (born 12 September 1987) is a Portuguese trampoline gymnast. He represented Portugal at the 2008 Summer Olympics in Beijing, China and at the 2012 Summer Olympics in London, United Kingdom.

In 2008, he finished in 11th place in the qualification round in the men's trampoline event. In 2012 he finished in 15th place in the qualification round in this event at the 2012 Summer Olympics.

In 2009, he competed in the men's synchronized trampoline at the 2009 World Games held in Kaohsiung, Taiwan.

In 2019, he represented Portugal at the 2019 European Games and he won the bronze medal in the men's trampoline event.
