= Masaki Ito =

Japanese trampoline gymnast

- Nickname: Gachapin
- Born: 2 November 1988 (age 37) Nerima, Japan

Gymnastics career
- Discipline: Trampoline gymnastics
- Country represented: Japan (2007-)
- Club: Touei Housing Corporation , Tokyo, JPN
- Head coach: Norifumi Yamamoto
Medal record
Men's trampoline gymnastics
Representing Japan
World Championships
Gold medal – first place	2011 Birmingham	Team
Bronze medal – third place	2017 Sofia	Team
Bronze medal – third place	2011 Birmingham	Individual
Bronze medal – third place	2010 Metz	Synchro
Asian Championships
Gold medal – first place	2018 Manila	Individual
Pacific Rim Championships
Gold medal – first place	2014 Richmond	Synchro

Masaki Ito (伊藤 正樹, Itō Masaki; born 2 November 1988 in Nerima, Tokyo) is a Japanese citizen and trampoline gymnast, representing his nation at international competitions.

At the age of four Ito began to learn swimming and gymnastics, including artistic gymnastics and trampoline, but by the age of six, following the advice of his instructor, began to focus on the trampoline. He enjoyed the trampoline because it felt like flying.

Ito participated at the 2012 Summer Olympics in London. He competed at world championships, including at the 2007, 2009, 2010, 2011, 2013, 2014 and 2015 Trampoline World Championships. Ito was unable to train for six months in 2013 because of injuries to his wrist, and incurred a back injury in 2015. He reached the final of the men's trampoline at the 2016 Olympics.
