= Flavio Cannone =

Italian trampoline gymnast (born 1981)

- Born: 5 November 1981 (age 44)
- Height: 165 cm (5 ft 5 in)

Gymnastics career
- Discipline: Trampoline gymnastics
- Country represented: Italy (2004-)
- Club: CS Esercito, Italy
- Head coaches: Vincenzo Canali [personal], Matteo Martinelli [national team]

Flavio Cannone (born 5 November 1981) is an Italian individual and synchronised trampoline gymnast, representing his nation at international competitions. Cannone participated at the 2004 Summer Olympics, 2008 Summer Olympics and 2012 Summer Olympics. He competed at world championships, including at the 2005, 2007, 2010, 2011, 2014 and 2015 Trampoline World Championships. He participated at the 2015 European Games in Baku.

He took up the sport in 1993.
