= 2023 Pan American Trampoline and Tumbling Championships =

International sports competition

The 2023 Pan American Trampoline and Tumbling Championships were held in Monterrey, Mexico, from May 12 to 14, 2023. The competition was organized by the Mexican Gymnastics Federation and approved by the International Gymnastics Federation.

== Medalists ==
| Event | Gold | Silver | Bronze |
|---|---|---|---|
Men
| Individual trampoline | Ángel Hernández (COL) | Jérémy Chartier (CAN) | Rayan Dutra (BRA) |
| Synchronized trampoline | Keegan Soehn (CAN); Nathan Shuh (CAN) | Lucas Tobias (BRA); Gabriel Soares (BRA) | Federico Cury (ARG); Ralph Stots (ARG) |
| Trampoline team | Canada; Jérémy Chartier; Keegan Soehn; Nathan Shuh; Aubin Rémi | United States; Aliaksei Shostak; Isaac Rowley; Ruben Padilla; Cody Gesuelli | Argentina; Santiago Ferrari; Federico Cury; Tobias Weise; Tomas Roberti |
| Double mini | Ruben Padilla (USA) | Santiago Ferrari (ARG) | Zachary Blakely (CAN) |
| Double mini team | Canada; Anthony Bianchet; Zachary Blakely; Nolan Zurek; Jeremy Meyer | Mexico; Alberto del Rio; Santiago Gonzalez; Rigoberto Zermeño | Argentina; Santiago Ferrari; Agustin Messuti; Tobias Weise; Tomas Roberti |
Women
| Individual trampoline | Camilla Lopes (BRA) | Jessica Stevens (USA) | Sophiane Méthot (CAN) |
| Synchronized trampoline | Nicole Ahsinger (USA); Cheyenne Webster (USA) | Camilla Gomes (BRA); Alice Gomes (BRA) | Martina Quintana (ARG); Alma Figueredo (ARG) |
| Trampoline team | Canada; Samantha Smith; Sarah Milette; Sophiane Méthot; Rachel Tam | United States; Jessica Stevens; Nicole Ahsinger; Cheyenne Webster; Ava Hernando | Brazil; Camilla Lopes; Maria Luisa França; Alice Gomes; Ana Luisa Pereira |
| Double mini | Hannah Metheral (CAN) | Maya Quinteros (BOL) | Kayla Howell (CAN) |

== Medal table ==
* Host nation (Mexico)

| Rank | Nation | Gold | Silver | Bronze | Total |
|---|---|---|---|---|---|
| 1 | Canada | 5 | 1 | 3 | 9 |
| 2 | United States | 2 | 3 | 0 | 5 |
| 3 | Brazil | 1 | 2 | 2 | 5 |
| 4 | Colombia | 1 | 0 | 0 | 1 |
| 5 | Argentina | 0 | 1 | 4 | 5 |
| 6 | Bolivia | 0 | 1 | 0 | 1 |
| 6 | Mexico* | 0 | 1 | 0 | 1 |
| Totals (7 entries) | | 9 | 9 | 9 | 27 |
