= 2014 Pacific Rim Gymnastics Championships – Trampoline =

The Trampolining competition for the 2014 Pacific Rim Gymnastics Championships was held on 10 April to 12 April 2014 at the Richmond Olympic Oval. The juniors and seniors competed together in the team final but competed separately for the synchro and individual competition. The synchro competition was held on 10 April, the individual and team competitions were held on 11 April, and finals were held on 12 April.

== Team ==
=== Men's team ===
Results

Rank	Team	Routine 1	Routine 2	Total
1st place, gold medalist(s)	China	143.660	175.595	319.225
1st place, gold medalist(s)	Hu Zichao	49.090	57.950	319.225
1st place, gold medalist(s)	Lian Shidong	~~45.425~~	58.660	319.225
1st place, gold medalist(s)	Liu Changxin	46.110	~~57.215~~	319.225
1st place, gold medalist(s)	Zhang Zhenquian	48.460	58.985	319.225
2nd place, silver medalist(s)	Canada	140.550	169.225	309.775
2nd place, silver medalist(s)	Ben Blais	~~43.285~~	~~51.100~~	309.775
2nd place, silver medalist(s)	Jason Burnett	48.645	59.400	309.775
2nd place, silver medalist(s)	Keevin Madigan	43.965	53.360	309.775
2nd place, silver medalist(s)	Keegan Soehn	47.940	56.465	309.775
3rd place, bronze medalist(s)	Australia	138.405	169.270	307.675
3rd place, bronze medalist(s)	Dominic Clarke	45.285	56.135	307.675
3rd place, bronze medalist(s)	Blake Gaudrey	48.080	57.200	307.675
3rd place, bronze medalist(s)	Hugh McConnell	45.040	~~41.805~~	307.675
3rd place, bronze medalist(s)	Shaun Swadling	~~44.125~~	55.935	307.675
4	Japan	142.380	153.210	295.590
4	Ryuta Ichikawa	44.025	~~32.260~~	295.590
4	Masaki Ito	49.830	42.540	295.590
4	Ryosuke Sakai	~~43.950~~	53.950	295.590
4	Yasuhiro Ueyama	48.525	56.720	295.590
5	Mexico	138.315	155.885	294.200
5	Hector Ivan Chavez Hernandez	~~43.205~~	48.965	294.200
5	Luis Armando Loria Cetina	44.085	54.770	294.200
5	Cesar Prieto Angel	46.375	52.150	294.200
5	Jose Alberto Vargas Garcia	47.855	~~44.540~~	294.200

=== Women's team ===
Results

Rank	Team	Routine 1	Routine 2	Total
1st place, gold medalist(s)	China	138.145	160.950	299.095
1st place, gold medalist(s)	Diao Ruiwei	46.605	~~26.305~~	299.095
1st place, gold medalist(s)	Jia Yujie	~~43.515~~	52.890	299.095
1st place, gold medalist(s)	Liu Lingling	47.300	54.100	299.095
1st place, gold medalist(s)	Zhu Xueying	44.240	53.960	299.095
2nd place, silver medalist(s)	Canada	134.210	155.410	289.620
2nd place, silver medalist(s)	Frederike Breault	41.055	50.090	289.620
2nd place, silver medalist(s)	Rosie MacLennan	47.230	53.920	289.620
2nd place, silver medalist(s)	Samantha Sendel	45.925	51.400	289.620
2nd place, silver medalist(s)	Kieran Wheatley	~~27.940~~	~~47.565~~	289.620
3rd place, bronze medalist(s)	Japan	133.725	154.485	288.210
3rd place, bronze medalist(s)	Ayano Kishi	46.280	~~49.875~~	288.210
3rd place, bronze medalist(s)	Hikaru Mori	42.925	52.115	288.210
3rd place, bronze medalist(s)	Yuri Murayama	~~42.225~~	50.615	288.210
3rd place, bronze medalist(s)	Yuna Sato	44.520	51.755	288.210
4	Mexico	128.125	147.530	275.655
4	Karina Cantu Martinez	41.715	50.475	275.655
4	Alejandra Fernandez Lomeli	43.425	47.285	275.655
4	Lindsay Fuentes Rosas	~~40.170~~	~~27.760~~	275.655
4	Dafne Carolina Navarro Loza	42.985	49.770	275.655

== Senior ==
=== Men's Individual ===
Results

Rank	Gymnast	D Score	E Score	T Score	Pen.	Total
1st place, gold medalist(s)	Yasuhiro Ueyama; Japan	16.6	25.200	16.960		58.760
2nd place, silver medalist(s)	Zhang Zenqian; China	16.0	25.800	16.720		58.520
3rd place, bronze medalist(s)	Hu Zichao; China	16.0	25.200	17.155		58.355
4	Keegan Soehn; Canada	16.9	23.700	16.685		57.285
5	Blake Gaudrey; Australia	16.0	23.400	16.835		56.235
6	Cesar Prieto; Mexico	14.6	22.200	15.990		52.790
7	Shaun Swadling; Australia	13.6	21.000	14.950		49.550
8	Jason Burnett; Canada	6.3	6.600	5.080		17.980

=== Men's Synchro ===
Results

Position	Team	D Score	E Score	S Score	Pen.	Total
1st place, gold medalist(s)	Japan; Masaki Ito; Yasuhiro Ueyama	15.0	16.900	18.200		50.100
2nd place, silver medalist(s)	China; Hu Zichao; Zhang Zenqian	16.0	16.200	17.800		50.000
3rd place, bronze medalist(s)	Australia; Blake Gaudrey; Shaun Swadling	14.6	16.400	18.400		49.400
4	Canada; Jason Burnett; Keegan Soehn	5.6	4.700	5.200		15.500

=== Women's Individual ===
Results

Rank	Gymnast	D Score	E Score	T Score	Pen.	Total
1st place, gold medalist(s)	Rosie MacLennan; Canada	15.0	24.600	15.360		54.960
2nd place, silver medalist(s)	Liu Lingling; China	13.8	24.900	15.650		54.350
3rd place, bronze medalist(s)	Ayano Kishi; Japan	13.1	24.300	14.980		52.980
4	Samantha Sendel; Canada	14.4	22.800	14.785		51.985
5	Dafne Navarro; Mexico	13.3	21.900	14.385		49.585
6	Diao Ruiwei; China	11.3	22.500	15.765		49.565
7	Alejandra Fernandez; Mexico	12.1	21.300	14.040		47.440
8	Yuna Sato; Japan	10.6	20.100	14.490		45.190

=== Women's Synchro ===
Results

Position	Team	D Score	E Score	S Score	Pen.	Total
1st place, gold medalist(s)	Canada; Rosie MacLennan; Samantha Sendel	14.0	15.400	19.000		48.400
2nd place, silver medalist(s)	Japan; Ayano Kishi; Yuna Sato	11.2	16.400	17.800		45.400
3rd place, bronze medalist(s)	China; Diao Ruiwei; Liu Lingling	6.1	8.500	9.400		24.00

== Junior ==
=== Men's Individual ===
Results

Rank	Gymnast	D Score	E Score	T Score	Pen.	Total
1st place, gold medalist(s)	Liang Shidong; China	14.8	21.600	16.480		57.380
2nd place, silver medalist(s)	Liu Changxin; China	14.8	25.500	16.760		57.060
3rd place, bronze medalist(s)	Dominic Clarke; Australia	14.4	24.300	16.240		54.940
4	Ryosuke Sakai; Japan	14.5	23.700	16.135		54.335
5	Luis Armando Loria; Mexico	15.0	21.000	15.525		51.525
6	Ben Blais; Canada	13.5	20.100	15.500		49.100
7	Dylan Schmidt; New Zealand	12.3	18.600	13.510		44.410
8	Keevin Madigan; Canada	3.1	3.900	3.290		10.290

=== Men's Synchro ===
Results

Position	Team	D Score	E Score	S Score	Pen.	Total
1st place, gold medalist(s)	China; Liang Shidong; Liu Changxin	14.8	17.400	18.800		51.000
2nd place, silver medalist(s)	Australia; Dominic Clarke; Hugh McConnell	13.3	15.600	16.600		45.500
3rd place, bronze medalist(s)	Canada; Ben Blais; Keevin Madigan	12.0	15.700	16.400		44.100
4	Japan; Ryuta Ichikawa; Ryosuke Sakai	5.6	6.400	6.400		18.400

=== Women's Individual ===
Results

Rank	Gymnast	D Score	E Score	T Score	Pen.	Total
1st place, gold medalist(s)	Zhu Xueying; China	12.3	25.500	15.260		53.060
2nd place, silver medalist(s)	Jia Yujie; China	12.0	24.000	15.325		51.325
3rd place, bronze medalist(s)	Hikaru Mori; Japan	14.0	22.200	14.405		50.605
4	Frederike Breault; Canada	11.9	22.800	14.785		49.485
5	Yuri Murayama; Japan	12.7	22.200	14.500		49.400
6	Karina Cantu; Mexico	10.4	23.700	15.130		49.230
7	Abbie Watts; Australia	11.1	21.600	14.140		46.840
8	Alexa Kennedy; New Zealand	12.8	18.000	14.175		44.975

=== Women's Synchro ===
Results

Position	Team	D Score	E Score	S Score	Pen.	Total
1st place, gold medalist(s)	Australia; Jayden Cooney; Abbie Watts	9.7	15.200	18.600		43.500
2nd place, silver medalist(s)	Japan; Hikaru Mori; Yuri Murayama	11.0	15.000	17.200		43.200
3rd place, bronze medalist(s)	Canada; Frederike Breault; Kieran Wheatley	9.9	15.300	15.200		40.400
