= Gymnastics at the 2024 Summer Olympics – Women's trampoline =

Women's trampoline at the Games of the XXXIII Olympiad
- Venue: Accor Arena
- Date: 2 August 2024
- Competitors: 16 from 13 nations
- Winning score: 56.480

Medalists
1st place, gold medalist(s)		Bryony Page	Great Britain
2nd place, silver medalist(s)		Viyaleta Bardzilouskaya	Individual Neutral Athletes
3rd place, bronze medalist(s)		Sophiane Méthot	Canada

The women's trampoline competition at the 2024 Summer Olympics took place on 2 August 2024 at the Accor Arena (referred to as the Bercy Arena due to IOC sponsorship rules).

== Schedule ==
All times are Central European Summer Time (UTC+2)

Date	Time	Round
2 August	12:00	Qualification
2 August	13:50	Final

== Results ==
=== Qualification ===
Qualification rules: the top eight gymnasts with the highest scores (out of two routines) qualify for the final. Highest score is bolded.

Rank	Athlete	1st routine	2nd routine	Highest score	Qual.
1	Zhu Xueying (CHN)	55.950	**56.720**	56.720	Q
2	Viyaleta Bardzilouskaya (AIN)	**56.340**	—	56.340	Q
3	Hu Yicheng (CHN)	**56.270**	—	56.270	Q
4	Anzhela Bladtceva (AIN)	55.640	**55.710**	55.710	Q
5	Bryony Page (GBR)	54.970	**55.620**	55.620	Q
6	Hikaru Mori (JPN)	54.890	**55.150**	55.150	Q
7	Maddie Davidson (NZL)	**54.740**	53.910	54.740	Q
8	Sophiane Méthot (CAN)	**54.640**	53.160	54.640	Q
9	Noemi Romero Rosario (ESP)	17.340	**54.250**	54.250	R1
10	Seljan Mahsudova (AZE)	42.950	**53.750**	53.750	R2
11	Luba Golovina (GEO)	**53.620**	53.460	53.620	—
12	Léa Labrousse (FRA)	**53.220**	52.990	53.220	—
13	Jessica Stevens (USA)	**53.170**	52.450	53.170	—
14	Isabelle Songhurst (GBR)	**52.920**	52.840	52.920	—
15	Camilla Gomes (BRA)	42.920	**50.580**	50.580	—
16	Malak Hamza (EGY)	9.090	**9.650**	9.650	—

=== Final ===
Rank	Athlete	D Score	E Score	T Score	H Score	Total
1st place, gold medalist(s)	Bryony Page (GBR)	15.000	16.400	15.580	9.500	56.480
2nd place, silver medalist(s)	Viyaleta Bardzilouskaya (AIN)	14.400	16.000	16.560	9.100	56.060
3rd place, bronze medalist(s)	Sophiane Méthot (CAN)	15.000	15.600	15.250	9.800	55.650
4	Zhu Xueying (CHN)	14.400	16.500	15.710	8.900	55.510
5	Anzhela Bladtceva (AIN)	14.400	16.000	15.420	9.200	55.020
6	Hikaru Mori (JPN)	15.000	15.200	15.740	8.800	54.740
7	Maddie Davidson (NZL)	14.000	15.100	15.930	9.200	54.230
8	Hu Yicheng (CHN)	3.200	3.300	3.390	1.900	11.790
