= Gymnastics at the 2026 Asian Games – Women's trampoline =

Women's trampoline at the 2026 Asian Games

Women's individual at the 2026 Asian Games
- Venue: Nagoya General Gymnasium Rainbow Hall
- Date: 27 September 2026
- Competitors: 10 from 6 nations

Medalists
gold medal	Hikaru Mori	Japan
silver medal	Megu Uyama	Japan
bronze medal	Qiu Zheng	China

The women's trampoline competition at the 2026 Asian Games took place on 27 September 2026 at the Nagoya General Gymnasium Rainbow Hall in Nagoya, Japan.

== Schedule ==
All times are Japan Standard Time (UTC+09:00)

Date	Time	Event
Sunday, 27 September 2026	18:30	Qualification
Sunday, 27 September 2026	19:55	Final
Sunday, 27 September 2026	Follow by	Super Final

== Results ==
=== Qualification ===
Rank	Athlete	Routine 1	Routine 2	Best	Notes
1	Zhu Xueying (CHN)	56.90		56.90	Q
2	Hikaru Mori (JPN)	55.23	56.19	56.19	Q
3	Megu Uyama (JPN)	55.77		55.77	Q
4	Qiu Zheng (CHN)	55.38	23.27	55.38	Q
5	Viktoriya Butolina (KAZ)	52.18		52.18	Q
6	Fatemeh Tavassoli (IRI)	46.43	45.83	46.43	Q
7	Liu Jennifer (HKG)	17.80	43.89	43.89	Q
8	Xiao Yiyao (HKG)	43.76	14.27	43.76	Q
9	Yalda Hassan Shokati (IRI)	41.26		41.26	R1
10	Luvicar Janine Padilla (PHI)	21.38	5.24	21.38	R2

=== Final ===
Rank	Athlete	D Score	E Score	T Score	H Score	Pen	Total	Notes
1	Qiu Zheng (CHN)	13.60	16.70	15.95	9.40		55.65	Q
2	Hikaru Mori (JPN)	14.90	15.90	15.89	8.90	-0.20	55.39	Q
3	Megu Uyama (JPN)	14.70	15.20	15.47	8.80	-0.60	53.57	Q
4	Viktoriya Butolina (KAZ)	14.50	15.00	15.15	8.70		53.35	Q
5	Fatemeh Tavassoli (IRI)	8.30	14.90	14.17	9.80		47.17	
6	Liu Jennifer (HKG)	9.30	13.50	13.46	9.50		45.76	
7	Xiao Yiyao (HKG)	4.40	6.40	6.76	4.60		22.16	
8	Zhu Xueying (CHN)	2.00	1.80	1.74	1.00		6.54	

=== Super Final ===
Rank	Athlete	D Score	E Score	T Score	H Score	Pen	Total
1st place, gold medalist(s)	Hikaru Mori (JPN)	14.90	16.40	16.28	9.30		56.88
2nd place, silver medalist(s)	Megu Uyama (JPN)	14.70	16.50	15.98	9.40		56.58
3rd place, bronze medalist(s)	Qiu Zheng (CHN)	15.00	16.50	15.78	9.30		56.58
4	Viktoriya Butolina (KAZ)	11.90	15.30	15.55	9.40		52.15
