= Gymnastics at the 2023 Pan American Games – Women's synchronized trampoline =

Women's synchronized trampoline at the 2023 Pan American Games
- Venue: Training Center for Collective Sport
- Dates: November 3 and November 4
- Competitors: 10 from 5 nations
- Winning score: 48.190

Medalists
Gold medal	Jessica Stevens; Nicole Ahsinger	United States
Silver medal	Alice Gomes; Camilla Gomes	Brazil
Bronze medal	Dafne Navarro; Mariola García	Mexico

The women's synchronized competition of the trampoline gymnastics events at the 2023 Pan American Games was held on November 3 and 4, at the Training Center for Collective Sport in the National Stadium cluster in Santiago, Chile.

== Schedule ==
Date	Time	Round
November 3, 2023	10:00	Qualification
November 4, 2023	10:00	Final

== Results ==
=== Qualification round ===
The results were as follows:

Rk.	Nation	Athletes	Exce.	Time of F.	Diff.	Horizon	Pen.	Total	Notes
1	United States	Jessica Stevens; Nicole Ahsinger	7.600	18.58	13.10	9.65	-0.400	48.530	Q
2	Brazil	Alice Gomes; Camilla Gomes	7.900	18.58	10.30	9.20		45.980	Q
3	Canada	Rachel Tam; Gabriella Flynn	7.300	19.08	9.50	9.05		44.930	Q
4	Argentina	Lucila Maldonado; Valentina Podesta	8.600	18.06	7.80	9.60		44.060	Q
5	Mexico	Dafne Navarro; Mariola García	2.950	6.98	4.60	3.40		17.930	Q

=== Final ===
The results were as follows:

Rk.	Nation	Athletes	Exce.	Time of F.	Diff.	Horizon	Pen.	Total
1st place, gold medalist(s)	United States	Jessica Stevens; Nicole Ahsinger	7.300	18.24	13.10	9.55		48.190
2nd place, silver medalist(s)	Brazil	Alice Gomes; Camilla Gomes	7.900	18.04	10.70	9.50		46.140
3rd place, bronze medalist(s)	Mexico	Dafne Navarro; Mariola García	7.400	17.52	11.40	9.45		45.770
4	Argentina	Lucila Maldonado; Valentina Podesta	7.500	17.54	7.80	9.50		42.340
