= Gymnastics at the 2023 Pan American Games – Women's individual trampoline =

Women's individual trampoline at the 2023 Pan American Games
- Venue: Training Center for Collective Sport
- Dates: November 3 and November 4
- Competitors: 11 from 6 nations
- Winning score: 54.990

Medalists
Gold medal	Jessica Stevens	United States
Silver medal	Camilla Gomes	Brazil
Bronze medal	Dafne Navarro	Mexico

The women's individual competition of the trampoline gymnastics events at the 2023 Pan American Games was held on November 3 and 4, at the Training Center for Collective Sport in the National Stadium cluster in Santiago, Chile.

== Schedule ==
Date	Time	Round
November 3, 2023	16:00	Qualification
November 4, 2023	17:00	Final

== Results ==
=== Qualification round ===
The highest eight scores advance to the final. Only 2 gymnasts per NOC could advance.

Rank	Athlete	Exce.	Time of F.	Diff.	Horizon	Pen.	Total	Notes
1	Camilla Gomes (BRA)	15.400	15.790	14.60	8.80		54.590	Q
2	Nicole Ahsinger (USA)	14.600	15.520	14.30	9.40		53.820	Q
3	Dafne Navarro (MEX)	16.000	15.820	12.50	9.20		53.520	Q
4	Alice Gomes (BRA)	15.400	15.380	13.40	9.30		53.480	Q
5	Jessica Stevens (USA)	14.300	16.070	13.50	9.20		53.070	Q
6	Patricia Núñez (MEX)	15.900	14.530	13.10	9.30		52.830	Q
7	Rachel Tam (CAN)	14.600	14.500	14.20	9.20		52.500	Q
8	Mariola García (MEX)	13.900	15.310	13.30	8.90		51.210	
9	Valentina Podesta (ARG)	16.000	15.010	9.40	9.50		49.910	Q
10	Lucila Maldonado (ARG)	14.200	14.740	10.20	9.60		48.740	R1
11	Maya Quinteros (BOL)	10.300	13.420	8.10	9.00		40.820	R2

=== Final ===
The results were as follows:

Rank	Athlete	Exce.	Time of F.	Diff.	Horizon	Pen.	Total
1st place, gold medalist(s)	Jessica Stevens (USA)	15.000	15.890	14.40	9.70		54.990
2nd place, silver medalist(s)	Camilla Gomes (BRA)	14.300	16.240	14.40	8.90		53.840
3rd place, bronze medalist(s)	Dafne Navarro (MEX)	14.900	14.850	14.20	9.60		53.550
4	Nicole Ahsinger (USA)	14.300	15.070	14.30	9.20		52.870
5	Alice Gomes (BRA)	14.700	15.140	13.40	9.30		52.540
6	Valentina Podesta (ARG)	15.900	14.890	9.40	9.40		49.590
7	Rachel Tam (CAN)	13.900	14.030	12.40	9.00		49.330
8	Patricia Núñez (MEX)	7.000	7.330	6.00	4.50		24.830
