= Sophiane Méthot =

Canadian trampoline gymnast (born 1998)

- Nickname: Soph
- Born: August 3, 1998 (age 28) Longueuil, Quebec
- Height: 155 cm (5 ft 1 in)

Gymnastics career
- Discipline: Trampoline gymnastics
- Club: Virtuose Centre Acrobatique
- Head coach: Karina Kosko
Medal record
Women's trampoline gymnastics
Representing Canada
Olympic Games
Bronze medal – third place	2024 Paris	Individual
World Games
Bronze medal – third place	2025 Chengdu	Synchro
World Championships
Bronze medal – third place	2017 Sofia	Individual
Bronze medal – third place	2019 Tokyo	Individual team
Bronze medal – third place	2025 Pamplona	Individual
Pan American Championships
Gold medal – first place	2016 Bogotá	Individual
Gold medal – first place	2016 Bogotá	Synchro
Gold medal – first place	2016 Bogotá	Team
Gold medal – first place	2018 Lima	Individual
Gold medal – first place	2018 Lima	Synchro

Sophiane Méthot (born August 3, 1998) is a Canadian trampoline gymnast. She is the 2024 Olympic and 2017 and 2025 World bronze medalist in the individual event. She also won a bronze medal at the 2019 World Championships with the trampoline team. She is a two-time Pan American champion (2016, 2018) in both individual and synchronized trampoline.

== Gymnastics career ==
Méthot began gymnastics at the age of eight after being inspired by the movie Stick It.

=== 2015–2017 ===
Méthot won the individual title at the 2015 World Age Group Competition in the 17–18 age group.

Méthot made her senior international debut at the 2016 Shanghai World Cup and placed eighth in the synchro event with Sarah Milette. She also competed at the 2016 Coimbra World Cup, finishing 29th as an individual. She won three gold medals at the 2016 Pan American Championships- in the individual, synchro, and team events.

Méthot won the bronze medal behind Rosie MacLennan and Samantha Smith at the 2017 Canadian Championships. She won a bronze medal in synchro alongside Sarah Milette at the 2017 Minsk World Cup. At the 2017 Loule World Cup, she finished 12th in the individual qualification round. Then at the Valladolid World Cup, Milette and Méthot finished 12th in the synchro qualification round. She then competed at the 2017 World Championships and won the individual bronze medal behind Tatsiana Piatrenia and Ayano Kishi.

=== 2018–2019 ===
Méthot and Sarah Milette finished sixth at the 2018 Brescia World Cup. She successfully defended her individual and synchro Pan American Championships titles. She then competed at the 2018 World Championships, finishing 56th and 11th in the individual and synchro qualification rounds, respectively.

At the 2019 World Championships held in Tokyo, Japan, Méthot won the bronze medal in the women's team event alongside Samantha Smith, Sarah Milette and Rosie MacLennan.

=== 2020–2022 ===
Méthot was one of Canada's alternates for the 2020 Summer Olympics. She competed at the 2021 World Championships and finished fourth in the synchro competition with Sarah Milette.

Méthot won a bronze medal in the individual event at the 2022 Coimbra World Cup. She qualified for the final at the Rimini World Cup in first place, but she fell in the final and finished eighth. Then at the 2022 World Championships, she finished fifth in the synchro final with Milette.

=== 2023–2025 ===
Méthot finished eighth in the individual final at the 2023 Santarem World Cup, and she finished seventh at the Coimbra World Cup. She then finished fourth at the Varna World Cup. Méthot finished fifth in the individual event at the 2023 World Championships and qualified for the 2024 Summer Olympics.

Méthot won a silver medal at the 2024 Coimbra World Cup behind Anzhela Bladtceva. She represented Canada at the 2024 Summer Olympics and was the last qualifier for the women's trampoline final after finishing in eighth place. In the final, held the day before her 26th birthday, she improved her performance and won the bronze medal.

At the 2025 World Championships, Méthot won the individual bronze medal, behind Hu Yicheng and Hikaru Mori, after receiving a perfect 10 in horizontal displacement.
