= Gymnastics at the 2020 Summer Olympics – Women's trampoline =

Women's trampoline at the Games of the XXXII Olympiad
- Venue: Ariake Gymnastics Centre
- Date: 30 July 2021
- Competitors: 16 from 11 nations
- Winning score: 56.635

Medalists
1st place, gold medalist(s)		Zhu Xueying	China
2nd place, silver medalist(s)		Liu Lingling	China
3rd place, bronze medalist(s)		Bryony Page	Great Britain

The women's trampoline competition at the 2020 Summer Olympics took place on 30 July 2021 at the Ariake Gymnastics Centre.

The medals for the competition were presented by Tricia Smith, IOC Member, Olympian, and Silver Medalist, Canada; and the medalists' bouquets were presented by Luo Chaoyi, FIG Executive Committee Member; People's Republic of China.

== Schedule ==
All times are in Japan Standard Time (UTC+9)

Date	Time	Round
Friday, 30 July 2021	13:00	Qualifications
Friday, 30 July 2021	14:50	Finals

== Results ==
=== Qualification ===
Qualification rules: the top eight gymnasts with the highest total scores (1st routine + 2nd routine) qualify for the final.

Rank	Athlete	Nation	1st routine	2nd routine	Total	Notes
1	Liu Lingling	China	50.155	55.315	105.470	Q
2	Zhu Xueying	China	49.755	55.545	105.300	Q
3	Bryony Page	Great Britain	48.850	55.810	104.660	Q
4	Rosie MacLennan	Canada	48.840	55.595	104.435	Q
5	Megu Uyama	Japan	48.705	54.880	103.585	Q
6	Susana Kochesok	ROC	47.870	54.920	102.790	Q
7	Nicole Ahsinger	United States	48.325	53.785	102.110	Q
8	Dafne Navarro	Mexico	46.685	53.165	99.850	Q
9	Malak Hamza	Egypt	45.225	49.495	94.720	R1
10	Maddie Davidson	New Zealand	47.870	45.540	93.140	R2
11	Iana Lebedeva	ROC	48.615	23.190	71.805	
12	Léa Labrousse	France	14.015	54.070	68.085	
13	Hikaru Mori	Japan	47.350	16.425	63.775	
14	Samantha Smith	Canada	48.335	11.210	59.545	
15	Laura Gallagher	Great Britain	47.235	6.100	53.335	
16	Jessica Pickering	Australia	17.840	16.350	34.190	

R1 = Reserve 1 R2 = Reserve 2

=== Final ===
Position	Athlete	Difficulty	Execution	Horiz. Disp.	Flight	Total
1st place, gold medalist(s)	Zhu Xueying (CHN)	15.000	16.800	9.400	15.435	56.635
2nd place, silver medalist(s)	Liu Lingling (CHN)	15.000	16.000	9.100	16.250	56.350
3rd place, bronze medalist(s)	Bryony Page (GBR)	15.000	15.800	9.400	15.535	55.735
4	Rosannagh MacLennan (CAN)	14.900	15.600	9.200	15.760	55.460
5	Megu Uyama (JPN)	14.000	16.000	9.300	15.355	54.655
6	Nicole Ahsinger (USA)	14.300	15.300	9.300	15.450	54.350
7	Susana Kochesok (ROC)	14.400	15.300	9.000	15.590	54.290
8	Dafne Navarro Loza (MEX)	12.800	13.900	8.000	13.645	48.345
