= 2026 Pan American Trampoline and Tumbling Championships =

Gymnastics competition

- Location: Medellín, Colombia
- Date: May 22, 2026–May 24, 2026

The 2026 Senior Pan American Trampoline and Tumbling Championships were held in Medellín, Colombia, from May 22 to 24, 2026. The competition was organized by the Pan American Gymnastics Union and approved by the International Gymnastics Federation.

== Medalists ==
Event	Gold	Silver	Bronze
Men
Individual trampoline	(United States) Ruben Padilla	(United States) Aliaksei Shostak	(Argentina) Santiago Ferrari
Synchronized trampoline	(United States) Elijah Vogel (United States) Ruben Padilla	(Brazil) Wallace Sousa (Brazil) Vinicius Souza	(Colombia) Julian Alvis (Colombia) Manuel Sierra
Trampoline team	Colombia; Santiago Berrio; Diego Giraldo; Manuel Sierra; Julian Alvis	Brazil; Wallace Sousa; Arthur Ferreira; Vinicius Souza	United States; Ruben Padilla; Elijah Vogel; Trevor Harder; Aliaksei Shostak
Double mini	(Argentina) Santiago Ferrari	(Colombia) Nelson Ayala	(Brazil) Guilherme De Andrade Pinto
Women
Individual trampoline	(United States) Maia Amano	(United States) Leah Garafalo	(Brazil) Camilla Lopes
Synchronized trampoline	(United States) Ava Dehanes (United States) Leah Garafalo	(Mexico) Dafne Navarro (Mexico) Patricia Nuñez	(Brazil) Alice Gomes (Brazil) Camilla Lopes
Trampoline team	Brazil; Gabriela Cordeiro Rodrigues; Alice Gomes; Camilla Lopes	United States; Maia Amano; Sarah Webster; Ava DeHanes; Leah Garafalo	Mexico; Verenice Borges Medina; Aixa Narumi Rodriguez; Patricia Nuñez; Dafne Navarro
Double mini	Not awarded		
Mixed
Synchronized trampoline	(United States) Maia Amano (United States) Ruben Padilla	(Canada) Alex Beaulieu (Canada) Rielle Bonne	(Argentina) Tobias Weise (Argentina) Luclla Maldonado

== Medal table ==
* Host nation (Colombia)

Rank	Nation	Gold	Silver	Bronze	Total
1	United States	5	3	1	9
2	Brazil	1	2	3	6
3	Colombia*	1	1	1	3
4	Argentina	1	0	2	3
5	Mexico	0	1	1	2
6	Canada	0	1	0	1
Totals (6 entries)		8	8	8	24
