= 2024 African Trampoline Championships =

The 2024 African Trampoline Championships were held from 10 to 11 May 2024 in Bizerte, Tunisia.

== Senior medallists ==
Medal table by event
Trials	Gold	Silver	Bronze
Men
Individual trampoline	Egypt Seifeldeen Ismael	South Africa Jordan Booysen	Tunisia Ayoub Ben Yakhlef
Synchronized trampoline	Egypt: Seifeldeen Ismael; Ramez Sobhy	Algeria: Sadjed Bouchama; Mohamed Abderrahim M'hamedi	Tunisia: Ayoub Ben Yakhlef; Fadi Ahmed
Team trampoline	Egypt	Tunisia	Algeria: Abdelkader Sabour; Redha Messatfa; Noureddine-Younes Belkhir; Abdennour Anneg
Women
Individual trampoline	Egypt Malak Hamza	Namibia Carane van Zyl	Egypt Ashrakat Ismail
Synchronized trampoline	Egypt: Malak Hamza; Ashrakat Ismail	Tunisia: Islem Soussi; Nesrine Fadhlaoui	N/A
Team trampoline	Tunisia	N/A	N/A

== Junior medallists ==
Trials	Gold	Silver	Bronze
Men
Individual trampoline	Egypt Omar Farag	Algeria Hicham Bentaib	Egypt Ahmed Elshorbagy
Synchronized trampoline	Egypt: Mohamed Shahin; Omar Farag	Tunisia: Omar Farag; Omar Jouini	N/A
Team trampoline	Egypt	Tunisia	N/A
Women
Individual trampoline	Namibia Jessica Blaauw	Egypt Lamar Shoeb	Tunisia Galya Bitrou
Synchronized trampoline	Egypt: Saja Abdelhamid; Khadija Mohamed	Namibia: Jessica Blaauw; Hannah Dunaiski	Tunisia: Mariem Touzri; Galya Bitrou
Team trampoline	Egypt	Tunisia	N/A
