= Gymnastics at the 2023 Pan American Games – Men's synchronized trampoline =

Men's synchronized trampoline at the 2023 Pan American Games
- Venue: Training Center for Collective Sport
- Dates: November 3 and November 4
- Competitors: 12 from 6 nations
- Winning score: 49.880

Medalists
Gold medal	Aliaksei Shostak; Ruben Padilla	United States
Silver medal	Remi Aubin; Keegan Soehn	Canada
Bronze medal	Lucas Tobias; Rayan Dutra	Brazil

The men's synchronized competition of the trampoline gymnastics events at the 2023 Pan American Games was held on November 3 and 4, at the Training Center for Collective Sport in the National Stadium cluster in Santiago, Chile.

== Schedule ==
Date	Time	Round
November 3, 2023	10:30	Qualification
November 4, 2023	10:30	Final

== Results ==
=== Qualification round ===
The results were as follows:

Rk.	Nation	Athletes	Exce.	Time of F.	Diff.	Horizon	Pen.	Total	Notes
1	United States	Aliaksei Shostak; Ruben Padilla	8.300	18.18	15.40	9.30		51.180	Q
2	Canada	Remi Aubin; Keegan Soehn	7.650	16.64	15.60	9.35		49.240	Q
3	Brazil	Lucas Tobias; Rayan Dutra	7.450	17.54	14.60	9.55		49.140	Q
4	Colombia	Álvaro Calero; Ángel Hernández	7.350	17.62	13.30	9.20		47.470	Q
5	Argentina	Santiago Ferrari; Tomás Roberti	7.800	17.84	11.70	9.25		46.590	Q
6	Mexico	Donovan Guevara; José Marín	7.800	13.80	12.60	9.35		43.550	Q

=== Final ===
The results were as follows:

Rk.	Nation	Athletes	Exce.	Time of F.	Diff.	Horizon	Pen.	Total
1st place, gold medalist(s)	United States	Aliaksei Shostak; Ruben Padilla	8.100	16.98	15.40	9.40		49.880
2nd place, silver medalist(s)	Canada	Remi Aubin; Keegan Soehn	7.250	16.58	15.60	9.05		48.480
3rd place, bronze medalist(s)	Brazil	Lucas Tobias; Rayan Dutra	7.100	16.50	15.00	9.10		47.700
4	Argentina	Santiago Ferrari; Tomás Roberti	7.400	17.46	11.70	9.05		45.610
5	Mexico	Donovan Guevara; José Marín	6.350	11.80	9.90	7.60		35.650
6	Colombia	Álvaro Calero; Ángel Hernández	5.150	10.54	9.80	6.50		31.990
