= Gymnastics at the 2018 Asian Games – Women's trampoline =

Women's individual at the 2018 Asian Games
- Venue: Jakarta International Expo
- Date: 30 August 2018
- Competitors: 7 from 5 nations

Medalists
gold medal	Liu Lingling	China
silver medal	Hikaru Mori	Japan
bronze medal	Zhu Shouli	China

The women's trampoline competition at the 2018 Asian Games took place on 30 August 2018 at the Jakarta International Expo Hall D2.

== Schedule ==
All times are Western Indonesia Time (UTC+07:00)

Date	Time	Event
Thursday, 30 August 2018	12:00	Qualification
Thursday, 30 August 2018	15:00	Final

== Results ==
=== Qualification ===
Rank	Athlete	Routine 1	Routine 2	Total
1	Liu Lingling (CHN)	48.665	52.910	101.575
2	Hikaru Mori (JPN)	48.070	53.450	101.520
3	Zhu Shouli (CHN)	47.195	53.485	100.680
4	Megu Uyama (JPN)	47.160	52.290	99.450
5	Farangiz Ruzieva (UZB)	45.615	29.885	75.500
6	Nadeen Wehdan (QAT)	41.795	10.135	51.930
7	Pak Yu-jong (PRK)	44.355	5.400	49.755

=== Final ===
Rank	Athlete	Score
1st place, gold medalist(s)	Liu Lingling (CHN)	55.270
2nd place, silver medalist(s)	Hikaru Mori (JPN)	53.735
3rd place, bronze medalist(s)	Zhu Shouli (CHN)	53.615
4	Megu Uyama (JPN)	52.330
5	Farangiz Ruzieva (UZB)	49.725
6	Nadeen Wehdan (QAT)	46.075
7	Pak Yu-jong (PRK)	25.425
