= Liu Lingling =

Liu Lingling may refer to:

- Liu Lingling (gymnast) (born 1994), Chinese trampoline gymnast
- Liu Lingling (Singaporean host) (born 1963), Singaporean host and getai singer
