= Gymnastics at the 2023 Pan American Games – Men's individual trampoline =

Men's individual trampoline at the 2023 Pan American Games
- Venue: Training Center for Collective Sport
- Dates: November 3 and November 4
- Competitors: 13 from 7 nations
- Winning score: 58.930

Medalists
Gold medal	Ángel Hernández	Colombia
Silver medal	Rayan Dutra	Brazil
Bronze medal	Santiago Ferrari	Argentina

The men's individual competition of the trampoline gymnastics events at the 2023 Pan American Games was held on November 3 and 4, at the Training Center for Collective Sport in the National Stadium cluster in Santiago, Chile.

== Schedule ==
Date	Time	Round
November 3, 2023	17:00	Qualification
November 4, 2023	17:30	Final

== Results ==
=== Qualification round ===
The highest eight scores advance to the final. Only 2 gymnasts per NOC could advance.

Rank	Athlete	Exce.	Time of F.	Diff.	Horizon	Pen.	Total	Notes
1	Ángel Hernández (COL)	15.700	17.100	17.10	9.20		59.100	Q
2	Aliaksei Shostak (USA)	15.800	17.170	16.50	8.90		58.370	Q
3	Ruben Padilla (USA)	15.300	15.940	17.40	9.40		58.040	Q
4	Rayan Dutra (BRA)	15.400	16.310	17.30	8.60		57.610	Q
5	Keegan Soehn (CAN)	15.400	16.480	16.50	9.00		57.380	Q
6	Donovan Guevara (MEX)	15.300	16.880	15.40	9.50		57.080	Q
7	José Marín (MEX)	15.100	15.220	16.10	9.60		56.020	Q
8	Santiago Ferrari (ARG)	14.000	15.620	16.90	9.20		55.720	Q
9	Lucas Tobias (BRA)	13.200	15.420	15.80	9.50		53.920	R1
10	Tomás Roberti (ARG)	15.300	16.520	12.50	9.00		53.320	R2
11	Álvaro Calero (COL)	13.600	15.940	13.80	8.50		51.840	R3
12	Junior Mateo (DOM)	7.600	9.230	8.40	5.50		30.730	
13	Remi Aubin (CAN)	7.300	8.840	7.40	4.50		28.040	

=== Final ===
The results were as follows:

Rank	Athlete	Exce.	Time of F.	Diff.	Horizon	Pen.	Total
1st place, gold medalist(s)	Ángel Hernández (COL)	15.700	16.830	17.10	9.30		58.930
2nd place, silver medalist(s)	Rayan Dutra (BRA)	15.600	16.520	17.30	9.30		58.720
3rd place, bronze medalist(s)	Santiago Ferrari (ARG)	13.900	15.930	17.10	9.20		56.130
4	Donovan Guevara (MEX)	14.300	17.050	15.40	8.90		55.650
5	José Marín (MEX)	13.400	13.740	14.30	7.80		49.240
6	Ruben Padilla (USA)	7.600	8.110	9.40	4.50		29.610
7	Aliaksei Shostak (USA)	3.200	3.540	3.60	1.80		12.140
8	Keegan Soehn (CAN)	3.100	3.520	3.60	1.90		12.120
