= Daiki Kishi =

Japanese trampoline gymnast

- Born: 22 September 1994 (age 31) Komatsu, Japan

Gymnastics career
- Discipline: Trampoline gymnastics
- Country represented: Japan
- Club: Poppins
- Head coach: Manabu Yamaguchi
Medal record
Men's trampoline gymnastics
Representing Japan
World Championships
Bronze medal – third place	2017 Sofia	Team
Pacific Rim Championships
Gold medal – first place	2024 Cali	Team

Daiki Kishi (岸大貴, born 22 September 1994) is a Japanese trampoline gymnast. He competed in the 2020 Summer Olympics and won a team bronze medal at the 2017 World Championships.

== Early life ==
Kishi was born on 22 September 1994, in Komatsu, Ishikawa. His father competed in national-level gymnastics competitions. He has an older sister, Ayano Kishi, who competed in trampoline gymnastics for Japan at the 2012 Summer Olympics. He began trampoline gymnastics at three years old because he was inspired by his older sister.

== Gymnastics career ==
Kishi competed with Ryosuke Sakai in synchro at the 2017 Valladolid World Cup, where they won the silver medal. At the 2017 World Championships, he won a bronze medal in the team event alongside Masaki Ito and Ginga Munemoto.

At the 2018 Brescia World Cup, Kishi and Sakai won a silver medal in the synchro event. They went on the win the gold medal at the Loule World Cup.

Kishi and Sakai upset the reigning world champions to win the synchro title at the 2019 Baku World Cup. They then won the bronze medal at the Khabarovsk World Cup.

Kishi was selected to represent Japan at the 2020 Summer Olympics and advanced into the trampoline final, finishing seventh.

At the 2022 Arosa World Cup, Kishi and Sakai won the synchro event. He was left out of the national team in 2022 and 2023 due to poor performances at domestic competitions.

At the 2024 Pacific Rim Championships, Kishi won a team gold medal. He placed third in the individual event at the 2024 All-Japan Championships and was not selected for the 2024 Summer Olympics.

Kishi was selected to compete at the 2025 World Championships– his first major international competition since the 2020 Summer Olympics.
