= Susana Kochesok =

Russian trampoline gymnast

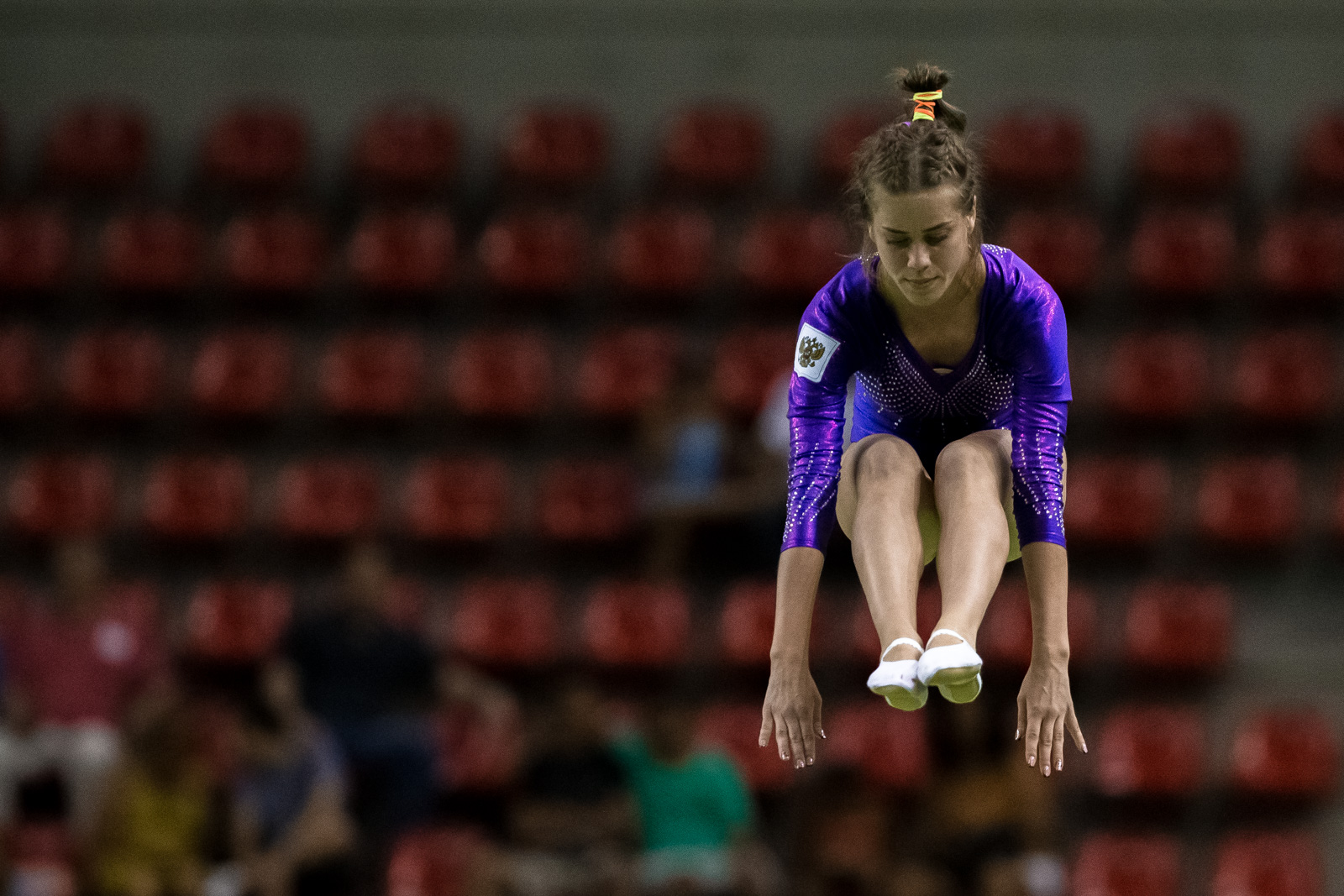
- Kochesok competing at the 2016 Gymnastics Olympic Test Event

Personal information
- Full name: Susana Arkadyevna Kochesok
- Born: 25 February 1995 (age 31) Tlyustenkhabl, Russia

Gymnastics career
- Discipline: Trampoline gymnastics
- Country represented: Russia
- Training location: Krasnodar, Russia
- Head coach: Svetlana Balandina
Medal record
Women's trampoline gymnastics
Representing Russia
World Championships
Gold medal – first place	2019 Tokyo	All-around team
Silver medal – second place	2019 Tokyo	Synchro
European Championships
Gold medal – first place	2021 Sochi	Synchro
Gold medal – first place	2021 Sochi	Team
Silver medal – second place	2016 Valladolid	Synchro
Silver medal – second place	2016 Valladolid	Team

Susana Arkadyevna Kochesok (Russian: Сусана Аркадьевна Кочесок; born 25 February 1995) is a Russian trampoline gymnast. At the 2019 World Championships, she won a gold medal in the all-around team event and a silver medal in the synchronized event. She won two gold medals at the 2021 European Championships. She competed at the 2020 Summer Olympics and placed seventh.

== Career ==
Kochesok began trampoline gymnastics when she was six years old. Shortly after beginning the sport, she broke her arm but continued training while wearing a cast. She joined the Russian national team in 2008.

At the 2015 Saint Petersburg World Cup, Kochesok won a gold medal in the synchro event with Nadezhda Glebova. She competed at the 2016 European Championships and won a silver medal with Anna Kornetskaya. Additionally, Russia won a silver medal in the team event. Kochesok and Kornetskaya won a bronze medal at the 2016 Brescia World Cup. She then won an individual bronze medal at the Arosa World Cup and won the synchro title with Kornetskaya.

Kochesok won the individual event at the 2017 Baku World Cup. She then won a synchro silver medal with Kornetskaya at the Loule World Cup. After only finishing 14th individually at the 2018 European Championships, she won the gold medal at the Arosa World Cup. Kochesok and Iana Lebedeva finished fourth in the synchro competition at the 2018 Loule World Cup.

Kochesok helped Russia win the all-around team event at the 2019 World Championships. She also won a silver medal in the synchro competition with Kornetskaya. Kochesok and Kornetskaya then won the synchro title at the 2021 European Championships. Additionally, she helped Russia win the team title. She won the individual title at the 2021 Anadia World Cup by only 0.500 points ahead of teammate Iana Lebedeva.

Kochesok qualified to represent the Russian Olympic Committee at the 2020 Summer Olympics. She finished seventh in the individual final.

== Personal life ==
Kochesok is of Circassian ancestry from the Republic of Adygea and was born in the village Tlyustenkhabl. Her mother played volleyball and her father was a weightlifter.

Kochesok graduated with a law degree from Kuban State Agrarian University.
