= Zhang Xinxin =

Zhang Xinxin is the name of:

- Zhang Xinxin (writer) (born 1953), Chinese writer
- Zhang Xinxin (footballer) (born 1983), Chinese association footballer
- Zhang Xinxin (gymnast) (born 2004), Chinese trampoline gymnast
