= Brownsey =

Brownsey is a surname. Notable people with the surname include:

- Louise Brownsey (born 2002), British gymnast
- Patrick Brownsey (1948–2023), British-born New Zealand botanist

== See also ==
- Brownsea
