= Rayan Dutra =

Brazilian trampoline gymnast

- Full name: Rayan Victor de Castro Dutra
- Born: 29 March 2002 (age 24) Belo Horizonte, Brazil

Gymnastics career
- Discipline: Trampoline gymnastics
- Country represented: Brazil
- Club: Minas Tênis Clube
Medal record
Men's trampoline gymnastics
Representing Brazil
Pan American Games
Silver medal – second place	2023 Santiago	Individual
Bronze medal – third place	2023 Santiago	Synchro
Pan American Championships
Bronze medal – third place	2023 Monterrey	Individual
South American Games
Silver medal – second place	2022 Asunción	Individual
South American Championships
Gold medal – first place	2021 Cochabamba	Individual
Bronze medal – third place	2019 Paipa	Individual
Bronze medal – third place	2019 Paipa	Team
Junior Pan American Games
Gold medal – first place	2021 Cali	Individual
Silver medal – second place	2021 Cali	Synchro

Rayan Dutra (born 29 March 2002) is a Brazilian individual and synchronized trampoline gymnast, representing his nation at international competitions. He competed at Trampoline Gymnastics World Championships in 2019, 2021, 2022 and 2023.

== Career ==
At 17 years old, Dutra competed at the 2019 Pan American Games, finishing in 5th place.

He also reached the final of the 2021 Trampoline Gymnastics World Championships, in the Synchronized Trampoline modality, finishing with his partner in 7th place.

At the end of 2021, participating in the Junior Pan American Games, held in Cali, he obtained a gold medal in the individual, and a silver medal in the synchronized.

He underwent back surgery in June 2022. Four months later, at the 2022 South American Games, he obtained a silver medal in Individual.

At the 2023 Pan American Trampoline and Tumbling Championships, held in Monterrey, Mexico, he obtained the bronze medal in the individual, with a performance close to that of the silver medalist.

Upon becoming Brazilian champion in 2023, he attracted attention by obtaining a score of 57.770 in the final, which would have been enough to qualify for the 2022 World Championship final in sixth place.

At the 2023 Pan American Games, Rayan obtained two medals, silver in Individual and bronze in Synchronized.

Rayan qualified for the Paris 2024 Olympic Games.
