= Gymnastics at the 2014 Asian Games – Women's trampoline =

Women's individual at the 2014 Asian Games
- Venue: Namdong Gymnasium
- Date: 26 September 2014
- Competitors: 7 from 5 nations

Medalists
gold medal	Li Dan	China
silver medal	Zhong Xingping	China
bronze medal	Ayano Kishi	Japan

The women's individual trampoline competition at the 2014 Asian Games in Incheon, South Korea was held on 26 September 2014 at the Namdong Gymnasium.

== Schedule ==
All times are Korea Standard Time (UTC+09:00)

Date	Time	Event
Friday, 26 September 2014	14:00	Qualification
Friday, 26 September 2014	16:15	Final

== Results ==
=== Qualification ===
Rank	Athlete	Routine 1	Routine 2	Total
1	Li Dan (CHN)	47.105	56.610	103.715
2	Zhong Xingping (CHN)	47.400	54.795	102.195
3	Anna Kasparyan (UZB)	45.500	51.300	96.800
4	Nadeen Wehdan (QAT)	41.000	46.715	87.715
5	Ayano Kishi (JPN)	44.950	9.365	54.315
6	Ekaterina Khilko (UZB)	45.165	5.480	50.645
7	Tamonwan Jantanakate (THA)	32.585	4.465	37.050

=== Final ===
Rank	Athlete	Score
1st place, gold medalist(s)	Li Dan (CHN)	57.000
2nd place, silver medalist(s)	Zhong Xingping (CHN)	54.830
3rd place, bronze medalist(s)	Ayano Kishi (JPN)	52.565
4	Ekaterina Khilko (UZB)	51.365
5	Anna Kasparyan (UZB)	50.760
6	Nadeen Wehdan (QAT)	47.315
7	Tamonwan Jantanakate (THA)	40.305
