= 2021 South American Trampoline Championships =

The 2021 South American Trampoline Championships were held in Cochabamba, Bolivia, from December 6 to 13, 2021. The competition was organized by the Bolivian Gymnastics Federation.

== Medalists ==
Event	Gold	Silver	Bronze
Men's individual trampoline	Rayan Dutra (BRA)	Santiago Ferrari (ARG)	Diego Giraldo (COL)
Women's individual trampoline	Lucila Maldonado (ARG)	Valentina Podesta (ARG)	Maria Eduarda Damasceno (BRA)
Men's synchronized trampoline	Cauã Rodrigues (BRA); Gabriel Sousa (BRA)	Santiago Ferrari (ARG); Bernardo Aquino (ARG)	Diego Giraldo (COL); Julián Alvis (COL)
Women's synchronized trampoline	Florencia Braun (ARG); Julia Cano (ARG)	Lucila Maldonado (ARG); Mara Colombo (ARG)	—
Men's double mini	Ralph Stotz (ARG)	Bernardo Aquino (ARG)	Federico Cury (ARG)
Women's double mini	Lucila Maldonado (ARG)	Florencia Braun (ARG)	Julia Cano (ARG)
