= Anzhela Bladtceva =

Russian trampoline gymnast

- Анже́ла Бла́дцева
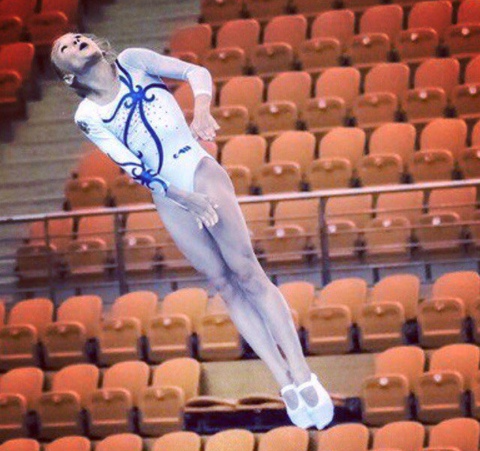
- Bladtceva at the 2024 Russian Championships

Personal information
- Full name: Anzhela Viktorovna Bladtceva
- Born: 23 July 2005 (age 21) Saint Petersburg, Russia

Gymnastics career
- Discipline: Trampoline gymnastics
- Country represented: Russia
- Head coach: Elena Fedorenchik
Medal record
Women's trampoline gymnastics
Representing Russia and Authorised Neutral Athletes
World Championships
Gold medal – first place	2026 Nanjing	Synchro
Gold medal – first place	2026 Nanjing	All-around team
Silver medal – second place	2025 Pamplona	All-around team
Silver medal – second place	2026 Nanjing	Individual team

Anzhela Viktorovna Bladtceva (Note: Sometimes transcribed to English as Angela Victorovna Bladtseva) (Russian: Анже́ла Ви́кторовна Бла́дцева; born 23 July 2005) is a Russian trampoline gymnast. She is the 2024 Russian champion and represented the Individual Neutral Athletes team at the 2024 Summer Olympics. She won a silver medal in the all-around team event at the 2025 World Championships.

== Gymnastics career ==
=== Junior ===
Bladtceva won the gold medal in the individual event at the 2017 World Age Group Competitions in the 11-12 age group. Additionally, she won a silver medal in synchronized trampoline alongside Daria Nazukova. She then won the individual title for the 13-14 age group at the 2018 World Age Group Competitions hosted in her hometown, Saint Petersburg. She also competed in the synchro event alongside Polina Denisova and won a silver medal. She then successfully defended this title at the 2019 World Age Group Competitions. She won an additional gold medal in the synchro event alongside Natalia Olefir.

Bladtceva won the junior individual title at the 2021 European Championships in Sochi, and the Russian team won the gold medal. At the 2021 World Age Group Competitions, she moved up to the 15-16 age group and won the individual title. She finished her junior career undefeated as an individual at the World Age Group Competitions.

=== Senior ===
Bladtceva was scheduled to make her senior debut in 2022. However, the International Gymnastics Federation (FIG) banned Russian and Belarusian athletes due to the Russian invasion of Ukraine. She continued to participate in domestic competitions. In the summer of 2023, the FIG announced they would lift the ban beginning in January 2024.

Bladtceva returned to international competition in February 2024 at the Baku World Cup, and she won the silver medal in the individual event behind the defending Olympic champion, Zhu Xueying. In April 2024, she won the individual title at Russian Championships. She then won her first World Cup title at the Arosa World Cup and won the silver medal at the Coimbra World Cup. She was the overall winner of the 2024 World Cup series.

Bladtceva won a quota for the 2024 Olympic Games with her 2024 World Cup series results. In June, she was approved to compete as an Individual Neutral Athlete by the International Olympic Committee (IOC). Bladtceva then sent her documents to the IOC and confirmed her intention to compete at the Olympics. She ultimately finished fifth in the women's individual final. She spoke positively of her experience at the Olympic Games with the media but was upset about not being allowed to attend the opening ceremony.

At the 2025 World Championships, Bladtceva helped the Individual Neutral Athletes from Russia win the silver medal in the all-around team event.

== Personal life ==
As of 2024, Bladtceva is a student at the Faculty of Individual Educational and Sports Technologies in the Department of Theory and Methodology at Lesgaft National State University of Physical Education, Sport and Health.
