= African Trampoline Championships =

The African Trampoline Championships (French: Championnats d'Afrique de trampoline) is a continental rhythmic gymnastics sporting competition organized by the African Gymnastics Union.

== List of Editions ==
Year	Host City	Date	Venue	No. of Athletes	Lead nation (S)	Lead nation (J)
2002	(Algeria) Algiers	12–18 October 2002	Hazem Abdelghani Omnisports Hall			
2004	(Senegal) Thiès	December 2004	Lat-Dior Hall		Algeria	South Africa
2006	(South Africa) Cape Town	November 2006				
2008	(Namibia) Walvis Bay	December 2008				
2010	(Namibia) Walvis Bay	March 2010	Jan Wilken Indoor Sports Complex	5		
2012	(South Africa) Pretoria	December 2012	Rembrandt Hall, University of Pretoria			
2014	(Namibia) Walvis Bay	27 April – 2 May 2014			South Africa	
2016	(Namibia) Walvis Bay	1–3 September 2016	Jan Wilken Indoor Sports Complex		South Africa	Namibia
2018	(Egypt) Cairo	April 2018	Cairo Stadium Indoor Halls Complex		Egypt	
2021	(Egypt) Cairo	26–27 May 2021	Nasr City Sporting Club		Egypt	
2023	(Morocco) Marrakesh	23–27 February 2023		19	Egypt	
2024	(Tunisia) Bizerte	10–11 May 2024	Fatnassi Omnisports Hall		Egypt	Egypt
2026	(South Africa) Tshwane	5–6 May 2026	Heartfelt Arena		Algeria	

== See also ==
- Trampoline World Championships
- African Artistic Gymnastics Championships
- African Rhythmic Gymnastics Championships
