= Nadeen Wehdan =

Qatari trampoline gymnast

- Full name: Nadeen Mammdoh Mohamed Wehdan
- Born: 20 August 1997 (age 29) Qatar
- Height: 165 cm (5 ft 5 in)

Gymnastics career
- Discipline: Trampoline gymnastics
- Country represented: Qatar
- Club: Qatar Gymnastics Club
- Head coach: Oybek Mamataliev

Nadeen Mammdoh Mohamed Wehdan (born 20 August 1997) is a Qatari former trampoline gymnast. She represented Qatar at the 2014 Summer Youth Olympics, where she was the first reserve for the trampoline final, and was the country's first Youth Olympian in trampoline gymnastics. She also competed at the 2014 World Championships and finished sixth at both the 2014 and 2018 Asian Games.

== Gymnastics career ==
Wehdan won a silver medal in the trampoline competition at the 2011 Arab Games in Doha. She competed at the 2011 World Age Group Competition in Birmingham and finished 29th in the qualifications for 13-14 year olds. At the 2012 South African International Championships, she won a gold medal in synchronized trampoline with teammate Fatima Abdulla.

Wehdan finished tenth at the 2014 Junior Asian Championships and earned a berth to the 2014 Summer Youth Olympics. She became the first Qatari trampoline gymnast to compete at the Youth Olympic Games. She finished ninth in the qualification round and was the first reserve for the individual trampoline final. She finished fourth in the individual event at the 2014 Loule World Cup. She then competed in the individual trampoline final at the 2014 Asian Games and finished sixth. At the 2014 World Championships, she finished 42nd in the individual qualification round and did not advance into the final.

Wehdan competed at the 2017 World Age Group Competition in Sofia and finished 36th in the individual qualifications for 17-21 year olds. She finished sixth in the individual trampoline final at the 2018 Asian Games in Jakarta. She has not competed in any major international competitions since the 2018 Asian Games.
