= Ryosuke Sakai =

Japanese trampoline gymnast

- Born: 24 July 1997 (age 29) Isehara, Japan
- Height: 168 cm (5 ft 6 in)

Gymnastics career
- Discipline: Trampoline gymnastics
- Country represented: Japan
- Club: Bandai Namco Amusement
- Head coach: Masaki Ito
Medal record
Trampoline gymnastics
Representing Japan
World Championships
Silver medal – second place	2021 Baku	Individual team
Pacific Rim Championships
Gold medal – first place	2024 Cali	Team
Gold medal – first place	2024 Cali	Individual

Ryosuke Sakai (堺亮介, Sakai Ryōsuke, born 24 July 1997) is a Japanese trampoline gymnast. He competed in the 2020 Summer Olympics and the 2018 Asian Games. He won a team silver medal at the 2021 World Championships, and he is the 2024 Pacific Rim individual champion.

== Gymnastics career ==
Sakai began the sport at the age of two because his mother was a gymnast. He also played association football as a child but began focusing solely on trampoline at the age of nine.

Sakai competed at the junior level at the 2014 Pacific Rim Championships and finished fourth in the individual event. He competed with Daiki Kishi in synchro at the 2017 Valladolid World Cup, and they won the silver medal.

Sakai and Kishi won a silver medal in synchro at the 2018 Brescia World Cup. They went on the win the gold medal at the Loule World Cup. He finished fourth as an individual at the 2018 Asian Games.

At the 2019 Baku World Cup, Sakai and Kishi upset the reigning world champions to win the synchro title. They then won the bronze medal at the Khabarovsk World Cup. He finished fifth in the individual event at the 2019 World Championships and secured a berth to the 2020 Summer Olympics.

Sakai represented Japan at the 2020 Summer Olympics and finished 15th in the qualification round after making mistakes in both routines. After the Olympics, he competed at the 2021 World Championships and helped Japan win the silver medal in the team event. At the 2022 Rimini World Cup, Sakai teammed up with Hiroto Unno to win the synchro gold medal, and he also won the individual silver medal. He returned to competing with Kishi at the Arosa World Cup, and they won the gold medal.

Sakai and Unno competed at the 2023 Coimbra World Cup and won the bronze medal. They then won the gold medal at the Palm Beach World Cup. At the 2024 Pacific Rim Championships, Sakai won the individual title, and he also won a team gold medal.

== Personal life ==
Sakai graduated from Kanazawa Seiryo University in 2020.
