= 2019 South American Trampoline Championships =

The 2019 South American Trampoline Championships were held in Paipa, Colombia, from September 3 to 9, 2019. The competition was organized by the Colombian Gymnastics Federation, and approved by the International Gymnastics Federation.

== Medalists ==
Event	Gold	Silver	Bronze
Men's individual trampoline	Lucas Adorno (ARG)	Bernardo Aquino (ARG)	Rayan Dutra (BRA)
Women's individual trampoline	Katish Hernandez (COL)	Alice Gomes (BRA)	Mara Colombo (ARG)
Men's trampoline team	Argentina; Lucas Adorno; Bernardo Aquino; Federico Cury; Ralph Stotz	Colombia; Haiber Giraldo; Jhoan Jimenez; Alvaro Calero; Vladimir Hoyos	Brazil; Rayan Dutra; Lucas Tobias; João Francisco Dorim
Women's trampoline team	Argentina; Lucila Maldonado; Mara Colombo; Marianela Galli	Colombia; Katish Hernandez; Sara Niño; Angie Peña; Orihanna Hernandez	Brazil; Ingrid Maior; Maria Rodrigues; Alice Gomes
Men's synchronized trampoline	Lucas Adorno (ARG); Federico Cury (ARG)	Alvaro Calero (COL); Haiber Giraldo (COL)	Bernardo Aquino (ARG); Santiago Escallier (ARG)
Women's synchronized trampoline	Marianela Galli (ARG); Mara Colombo (ARG)	Sara Niño (COL); Orihanna Hernandez (COL)	Angie Peña (COL); Katish Hernandez (COL)
Men's double mini trampoline	Lucas Adorno (ARG)	Nelson Ayala (COL)	Federico Cury (ARG)
Women's double mini trampoline	Mara Colombo (ARG)	Lucila Maldonado (ARG)	—
Men's tumbling	Nelson Ayala (COL)	Pablo Marincola (ARG)	Yamil Deluca (ARG)
Women's tumbling	Ayelen Skovich (ARG)	—	—
