= Gymnastics at the 2022 Asian Games – Women's trampoline =

Women's individual at the 2022 Asian Games
- Venue: Huanglong Gymnasium
- Date: 2 October 2023
- Competitors: 6 from 4 nations

Medalists
| gold medal | Zhu Xueying | China |
| silver medal | Hu Yicheng | China |
| bronze medal | Viktoriya Butolina | Kazakhstan |

The women's trampoline competition at the 2022 Asian Games took place on 2 October 2023 at the Huanglong Sports Centre Gymnasium.

== Schedule ==
All times are China Standard Time (UTC+08:00)

| Date | Time | Event |
|---|---|---|
| Monday, 2 October 2023 | 14:00 | Qualification |
| Monday, 2 October 2023 | 15:00 | Final |

== Results ==
=== Qualification ===
| Rank | Athlete | Routine 1 | Routine 2 | Best |
|---|---|---|---|---|
| 1 | Zhu Xueying (CHN) | 56.59 | | 56.59 |
| 2 | Hu Yicheng (CHN) | 55.50 | | 55.50 |
| 3 | Reina Satake (JPN) | 52.70 | 53.86 | 53.86 |
| 4 | Viktoriya Butolina (KAZ) | 51.31 | | 51.31 |
| 5 | Jennifer Liu (HKG) | 43.46 | 13.82 | 43.46 |
| 6 | Ena Sakurai (JPN) | 27.64 | 42.17 | 42.17 |

=== Final ===
| Rank | Athlete | Score |
|---|---|---|
| 1st place, gold medalist(s) | Zhu Xueying (CHN) | 56.72 |
| 2nd place, silver medalist(s) | Hu Yicheng (CHN) | 55.79 |
| 3rd place, bronze medalist(s) | Viktoriya Butolina (KAZ) | 52.60 |
| 4 | Jennifer Liu (HKG) | 44.66 |
| 5 | Reina Satake (JPN) | 11.47 |
