= Maia Amano =

American trampoline gymnast (born 2003)

- Born: November 21, 2003 (age 22) Honolulu, Hawaii, U.S.

Gymnastics career
- Discipline: Trampoline gymnastics
- Country represented: United States
- Club: Merino Trampoline Gymnastics Academy
- Head coach: Nuno Merino
Medal record
Women's trampoline gymnastics
Representing United States
World Championships
Silver medal – second place	2021 Baku	All-Around Team
Silver medal – second place	2022 Sofia	Double Mini Team
Pan American Championships
Gold medal – first place	2026 Medellin	Individual
Gold medal – first place	2026 Medellin	Mixed Synchro
Silver medal – second place	2026 Medellin	Team

Maia Amano (born November 21, 2003) is an American trampoline gymnast. She is a two-time World Championships silver medalist.

== Gymnastics career ==
Amano represented the United States at the 2021 Trampoline Gymnastics World Championships and won a silver medal in the all-around team event. She again competed at the 2022 Trampoline Gymnastics World Championships and won a silver medal in the double mini team event.

In June 2025, she competed at the 2025 USA Gymnastics Championships and won a gold medal in the first mixed syncho event, along with Ruben Padilla. In May 2026, she was selected to represent the United States at the 2026 Pan American Trampoline and Tumbling Championships. She won gold medals in the individual trampoline event, and mixed synchronized event, along with Padilla. She also won a silver medal in the team event.
