= Viyaleta Bardzilouskaya =

Belarusian trampoline gymnast

- Віялета Бардзілоўская
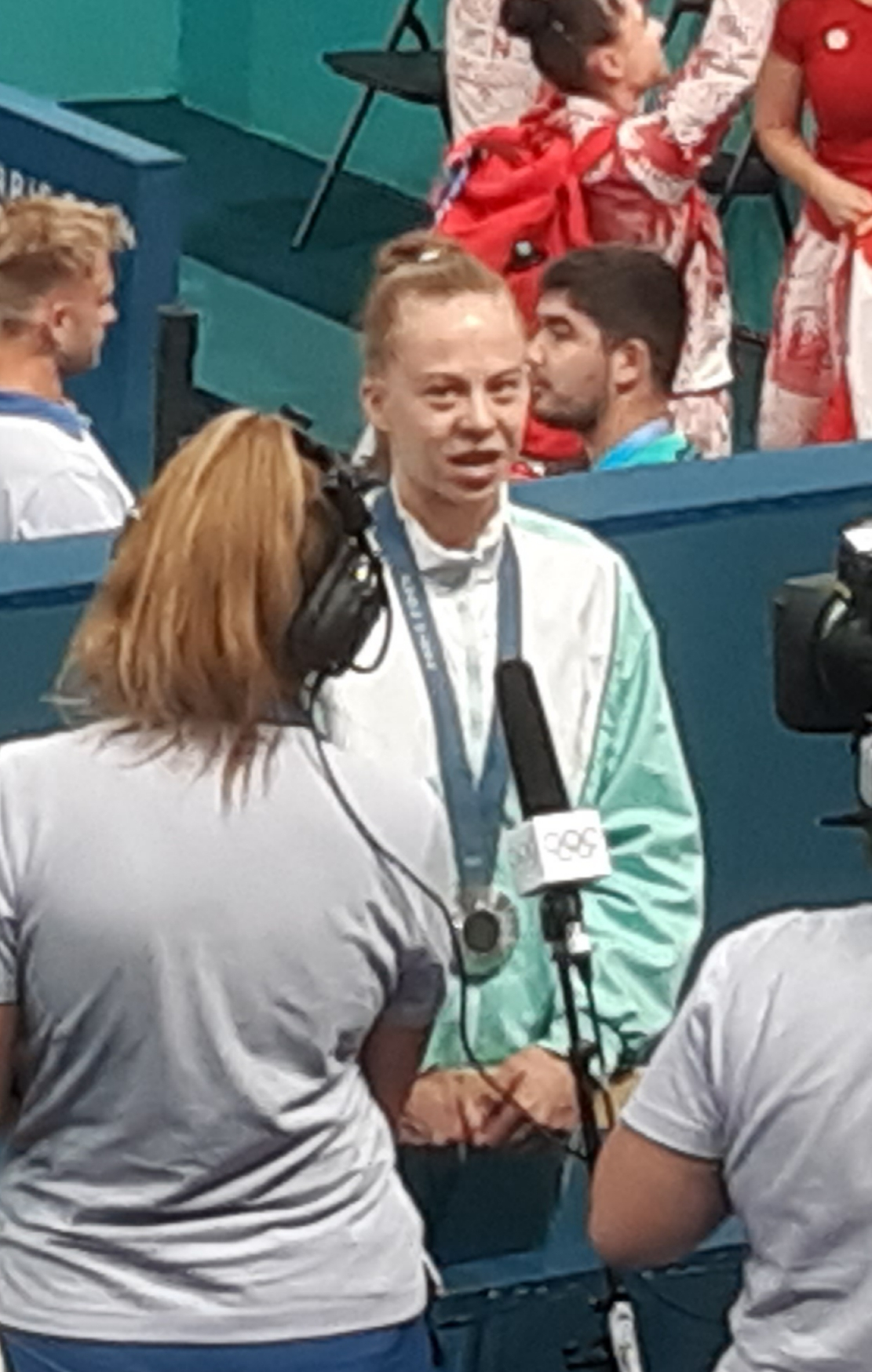
- Bardzilouskaya at the 2024 Summer Olympics

Personal information
- Full name: Viyaleta Aleksandrovna Bardzilouskaya
- Born: 7 June 2005 (age 21) Mogilev, Belarus

Gymnastics career
- Discipline: Trampoline gymnastics
- Country represented: Belarus
Medal record
Women's trampoline gymnastics
Representing Belarus and Individual Neutral Athletes
Olympic Games
Silver medal – second place	2024 Paris	Individual
World Championships
Silver medal – second place	2025 Pamplona	Individual team
Silver medal – second place	2026 Nanjing	Individual
Bronze medal – third place	2026 Nanjing	Individual team

Viyaleta Aleksandrovna Bardzilouskaya (Belarusian: Віялета Аляксандраўна Бардзілоўская; born 7 June 2005) is a Belarusian trampoline gymnast. She competed at the 2024 Summer Olympics as an Individual Neutral Athlete and won the silver medal in the individual final. She won a silver medal in the team competition at the 2025 World Championships. She is also the 2021 Junior European champion in synchronized trampoline.

== Early life ==
Bardzilouskaya was born on 7 June 2005 in Mogilev to parents Aleksandr and Galina. She began trampoline gymnastics when she was four years old. Her brother also competed in trampoline gymnastics, but he retired due to health issues.

== Gymnastics career ==
Bardzilouskaya placed 19th as an individual in the 2017 World Age Group Competitions in the 11-12 age category. She competed at the 2021 Junior European Championships and won a gold medal in the synchro competition with her partner Maryia Siarheyeva. Additionally, the Belarusian trampoline team won the silver medal behind Russia. Then at the 2021 World Age Group Competitions, Bardzilouskaya and Siarheyeva won the silver medal in synchro. Bardzilouskaya also placed 49th in the individual competition.

Bardzilouskaya made her senior international debut in February 2022 at the Baku World Cup and finished seventh in the individual final. In March 2022, the International Gymnastics Federation (FIG) banned Russian and Belarusian athletes due to the Russian invasion of Ukraine. Bardzilouskaya still competed in domestic competitions, winning the Belarusian individual national title in 2022. In 2024, the FIG approved certain athletes as "neutral" to return to international competition. She returned to competition at the 2024 Baku World Cup and finished tenth in the semifinal, making her the first reserve for the final. She then competed at the Cottbus World Cup and placed 12th.

Bardzilouskaya won a quota for the 2024 Olympic Games with her results in the 2024 World Cup series. In June, she was approved to compete as an Individual Neutral Athlete by the International Olympic Committee. At the Olympic Games, she won the silver medal in the individual trampoline competition behind Great Britain's Bryony Page. She was the first of the 32 Individual Neutral Athletes to win a medal.

At the 2025 World Championships, Bardzilouskaya won won a silver medal with the Individual Neutral Athletes from Belarus in the women's trampoline team competition.

== Awards ==
- Order of Honor (2024)
