= Gymnastics at the 2015 Pan American Games – Women's trampoline =

Women's trampoline at the 2015 Pan American Games
- Venue: Toronto Coliseum
- Dates: July 18–19
- Competitors: 8 from 6 nations
- Winning score: 53.560

Medalists
Gold medal	Rosie MacLennan	Canada
Silver medal	Dafne Navarro Loza	Mexico
Bronze medal	Karen Cockburn	Canada

The women's trampoline gymnastic event at the 2015 Pan American Games was held on July 18 and 19 at the Toronto Coliseum.

== Schedule ==
All times are Eastern Daylight Time (UTC-4).

Date	Time	Round
July 18, 2015	19:00	Qualification 1st Routine
July 18, 2015	19:30	Qualification 2nd Routine
July 19, 2015	19:00	Finals

== Results ==
=== Qualification ===
Position	Athlete	Compulsory	Voluntary	Penalty	Total	Notes
1	Karen Cockburn (CAN)	45.595 (2)	51.870 (1)		97.465	Q
2	Camilla Lopes Gomes (BRA)	45.010 (3)	50.755 (2)		95.765	Q
3	Clare Johnson (USA)	43.555 (5)	50.045 (3)		93.600	Q
4	Alida Rojo Mendoza (VEN)	40.770 (6)	45.205 (4)		85.975	Q
5	Mara Colombo (ARG)	38.545 (7)	41.370 (5)		79.915	Q
6	Rosie MacLennan (CAN)	47.555 (1)	22.710 (6)		70.265	Q
7	Dafne Navarro Loza (MEX)	43.755 (4)	10.785 (8)		54.540	Q
8	Charlotte Drury (USA)	22.145 (8)	11.060 (7)		33.205	Q

=== Final ===
Position	Athlete	Difficulty	Execution	Flight	Penalty	Total
1st place, gold medalist(s)	Rosie MacLennan (CAN)	15.000	22.500	16.060		53.560
2nd place, silver medalist(s)	Dafne Navarro Loza (MEX)	14.200	22.800	15.000		52.000
3rd place, bronze medalist(s)	Karen Cockburn (CAN)	13.300	22.800	15.460		51.560
4	Clare Johnson (USA)	13.800	22.800	14.630		51.230
5	Charlotte Drury (USA)	12.300	22.200	15.690		50.190
6	Camilla Lopes Gomes (BRA)	14.000	20.700	15.290		49.990
7	Mara Colombo (ARG)	9.800	21.000	15.035		45.835
8	Alida Rojo Mendoza (VEN)	10.800	17.700	14.950		43.450
