= 2016 Pan American Trampoline and Tumbling Championships =

International sports competition

The 2016 Pan American Trampoline and Tumbling Championships were held in Bogotá, Colombia, December 2–4, 2016. The competition was organized by the Colombian Gymnastics Federation, and approved by the International Gymnastics Federation.

== Medalists ==
Event	Gold	Silver	Bronze
Men
Individual trampoline	Rafael Andrade (BRA)	Luis Armando Loria (MEX)	Esaul Ceballos (MEX)
Synchronized trampoline	Lucas Adorno (ARG); Federico Cury (ARG)	Juan Carlos Valcarcel (COL); Haiber Giraldo (COL)	—N/a
Trampoline team	Mexico; Luis Armando Loria; Esaul Ceballos; Hector Chavez; Daniel Espinoza	Argentina; Federico Cury; Bernardo Aquino; Lucas Adorno	Canada; Nathan Shuh; Jean Cristophe Martel; Keegan Soehn
Double mini	Lucas Adorno (ARG)	Jonathon Schwaiger (CAN)	Federico Cury (ARG)
Double mini team	Canada; Mark Armstrong; Jonathon Schwaiger; Jean Christophe Martel; Elias Clarke	Argentina; Federico Cury; Bernardo Aquino; Lucas Adorno; Misael Livy	Colombia; Andres Amaya; Jhonny Calle; Juan Carlos Valcarcel; Edwin Quintero
Tumbling	Jonathon Schwaiger (CAN)	Michael Chaves (CAN)	Lucas Nascimento (BRA)
Women
Individual trampoline	Sophiane Methot (CAN)	Sarah Milette (CAN)	Katish Hernandez (COL)
Synchronized trampoline	Sarah Milette (CAN); Sophiane Methot (CAN)	Daienne Lima (BRA); Larissa Aladim (BRA)	Marianela Galli (ARG); Mara Colombo (ARG)
Trampoline team	Canada; Sarah Milette; Sophiane Methot; Rachel Tam; Brittany Falconer	Mexico; Dafne Navarro; Melissa Flores; Katia Mariscal; Lyndsay Fuentes	Argentina; Mara Colombo; Marianela Galli; Julieta Espeche
Double mini	Arden Oh (CAN); Mara Colombo (ARG)	—N/a	Tamara O'Brien (CAN)
Double mini team	Canada; Arden Oh; Tamara O'Brien; Jordyn Miller-Burko; Sarah Wheatley	Argentina; Mara Colombo; Marianela Galli; Julieta Espeche	—N/a
Tumbling	Raphaelle Villotte (CAN)	Nora Abouraja (CAN)	Thais Carneiro (BRA)
