= Hikaru Mori =

Japanese trampoline gymnast

- Born: 7 July 1999 (age 27) Tokyo, Japan
- Height: 159 cm (5 ft 3 in)

Gymnastics career
- Discipline: Trampoline gymnastics
- Training location: Kanazawa, Japan
- Club: Kanazawa Gakuin University
- Head coach: Akiko Maruyama
Medal record
Representing Japan
World Games
Silver medal – second place	2025 Chengdu	Synchro
World Championships
Gold medal – first place	2018 Saint Petersburg	Synchro
Gold medal – first place	2019 Tokyo	Individual
Gold medal – first place	2019 Tokyo	Individual team
Gold medal – first place	2021 Baku	Individual team
Gold medal – first place	2022 Sofia	Individual
Gold medal – first place	2022 Sofia	Synchro
Gold medal – first place	2025 Pamplona	Synchro
Silver medal – second place	2017 Sofia	Synchro
Silver medal – second place	2021 Baku	Synchro
Silver medal – second place	2025 Pamplona	Individual
Bronze medal – third place	2022 Sofia	Individual team
Bronze medal – third place	2025 Pamplona	Individual team
Bronze medal – third place	2026 Nanjing	Mixed synchro
Asian Games
Silver medal – second place	2018 Jakarta	Individual

Hikaru Mori (森ひかる, Mori Hikaru; born 7 July 1999) is a Japanese trampoline gymnast. She is a seven-time World champion and was the first Japanese female trampoline gymnast to win an individual title at the World Championships. She represented Japan at the 2020 and 2024 Summer Olympics. She won a silver medal at the 2018 Asian Games.

== Early life ==
Mori was born on 7 July 1999 in Tokyo. She was introduced to trampolining at the age of four at a rooftop play area of a local supermarket. She then joined a trampoline club alongside her older twin brothers. She moved with her mother to Kanazawa in grade 10 to improve her training.

== Gymnastics career ==
=== 2015–2017 ===
Mori won two gold medals at the 2015 World Age Group Competition in Odense, Denmark, in the 15-16 year old age group. She won the individual event by 0.070 points ahead of Isabelle Songhurst, and she won the synchronized trampoline title with her partner Yumi Takagi. She began competing in senior international competitions in 2016. At the 2016 Brescia World Cup, she won a silver medal in the synchro event alongside Rana Nakano. Then at the 2016 Arosa World Cup, Mori and Nakano won the bronze medal.

Mori finished fifth in both the individual and synchro events at the 2017 Minsk World Cup. She then competed at the 2017 World Championships held in Sofia and won a silver medal in the synchro event with Takagi. Additionally, she helped Japan finished fourth in the team competition and was the first reserve for the individual final.

=== 2018–2019 ===
Mori and Takagi won a bronze medal at the 2018 Brescia World Cup. Mori then finished fourth in the individual event at the Maebashi World Cup, and she placed fifth at the Loule World Cup. She won the silver medal in the individual event at the 2018 Asian Games behind China's Liu Lingling. Later that year, she won a gold medal at the World Championships in synchronized trampoline alongside Megu Uyama. They were the first female Japanese trampoline gymnasts to win a World title. Mori and Uyama had only been training together for a month before winning the title, because Takagi was injured. Mori also competed in the individual event and finished fifth.

Mori finished fourth in the individual event at the 2019 Minsk World Cup, and she then won a silver medal behind Yana Pavlova at the Khabarovsk World Cup. Then at the Valladolid World Cup, she won the bronze medal behind Chinese gymnasts Liu Lingling and Zhu Xueying. At the 2019 World Championships, Mori helped the Japanese women's team win the gold medal for the first time ever. She then also won the gold medal in the individual event and qualified for the 2020 Summer Olympics. This marked the first time a Japanese female gymnast won the World title in individual trampolining.

=== 2021–2022 ===
Mori won her first World Cup title at the 2021 Brescia World Cup. She competed at the postponed-2020 Summer Olympics in her hometown, but mistakes in the qualification round led to a 13th place finish that kept her out of the final. She admitted that she struggled with the pressure of being the gold-medal favorite. She contemplated retirement after this performance but competed at the 2021 World Championships in Baku and helped Japan successfully defend its team title. She also won a silver medal in the synchro event alongside Narumi Tamura.

Mori competed at the 2022 Rimini World Cup and finished ninth in the individual semifinals. She then won the silver medal at the 2022 Arosa World Cup behind the defending World champion Bryony Page. She then won the individual event at the 2022 World Championships ahead of Page, and she also won a gold medal in the synchro event with Uyama. Additionally, she helped Japan win the bronze medal in the team event.

=== 2023–2024 ===
Mori finished fourth at the 2023 Palm Beach World Cup, and she then won the bronze medal at the Varna World Cup. She then competed at the 2023 World Championships but did not qualify for the individual final after finished 14th in the semifinals. She also competed in the synchro event alongside Megu Uyama, and they finished fourth in the final.

Mori finished fifth at the 2024 Baku World Cup, eighth at the Cottbus World Cup, and seventh at the Arosa World Cup. She was selected to represent Japan at the 2024 Summer Olympics. She finished sixth in the individual final.

=== 2025 ===
Ahead of the 2025 World Championships, Mori trained in England alongside Bryony Page and also competed as a guest at the British Championships. At the World Championships, she won the silver medal in the individual event by only 0.030 points behind China's Hu Yicheng. She then won the gold medal in the synchro competition alongside Saki Tanaka. Additionally, she helped Japan win a bronze medal in the trampoline team event.
