= Jessica Stevens =

American trampoline gymnast

- Born: July 5, 2000 (age 26)

Gymnastics career
- Discipline: Trampoline gymnastics
- Country represented: United States
- Club: Fairland Gymnastics
- Head coach: Konstantin Gulisashvili
Medal record
Women's trampoline gymnastics
Representing United States
World Championships
Gold medal – first place	2023 Birmingham	All-around Team
Silver medal – second place	2021 Baku	All-around Team
Silver medal – second place	2022 Sofia	All-around Team
Bronze medal – third place	2023 Birmingham	Individual
Pan American Games
Gold medal – first place	2023 Santiago	Individual
Gold medal – first place	2023 Santiago	Synchronized
Pan American Championships
Gold medal – first place	2018 Lima	Team
Silver medal – second place	2023 Monterrey	Individual
Silver medal – second place	2023 Monterrey	Team
Bronze medal – third place	2018 Lima	Individual
Pacific Rim Championships
Silver medal – second place	2018 Medellin	Team

Jessica Stevens (born July 5, 2000) is an American individual and synchronised trampoline gymnast. She represented the United States at the 2024 Summer Olympics.

== Career ==
In May 2023, Stevens competed at the 2023 Pan American Trampoline and Tumbling Championships where she won silver in the individual and team events. In November 2023, she competed at the 2023 Pan American Games where she won gold in the individual and synchronized events.

She then competed at the 2023 Trampoline Gymnastics World Championships where she won gold in the team all-around and a bronze medal in the individual event with a score of 55.740, becoming the first American medalist in the event since 1974. Stevens previously competed at the Trampoline Gymnastics World Championships and placed 27th in 2017, 61st in 2018, 77th in 2019, 23rd in 2021 and sixth in 2022.

On June 26, 2024, Stevens was named to Team USA's roster to compete at the 2024 Summer Olympics. She earned her Olympic spot by having the highest combined score by an American in two of three Olympic qualifiers this season. During the women's trampoline event she scored 53.170 in the preliminary round, finishing in 13th place, and did not advance to the final.
