= Jérémy Chartier =

Canadian trampoline gymnast

- Born: March 27, 2001 (age 25) Montreal, Quebec, Canada
- Height: 172 cm (5 ft 8 in)

Gymnastics career
- Discipline: Trampoline gymnastics
- Country represented: Canada
- Head coaches: Karin Kosko, Alain Duchesne
Medal record
Men's trampoline gymnastics
Representing Canada
World Championships
Bronze medal – third place	2018 St. Petersburg	Team All-Around
World Age Group Competitions
Gold medal – first place	2015 Odense	Individual
Gold medal – first place	2017 Sofia	Individual
Pan American Games
Gold medal – first place	2019 Lima	Individual
Junior Pan American Championships
Gold medal – first place	2018 Cochabamba	Individual

Jérémy Chartier (born March 27, 2001) is a Canadian trampoline gymnast from Montreal, Quebec. Chartier is the reigning Pan American Games Champion having won gold in 2019 in Lima, Peru. Following his victory in Peru, Chartier said that "I was pretty nervous. I am not going to lie, those are not the best trampolines I have ever jumped on. But I think everyone had a solid routine. It was a really tight competition."
