= Hu Yicheng =

Chinese trampoline gymnast

- 胡译乘
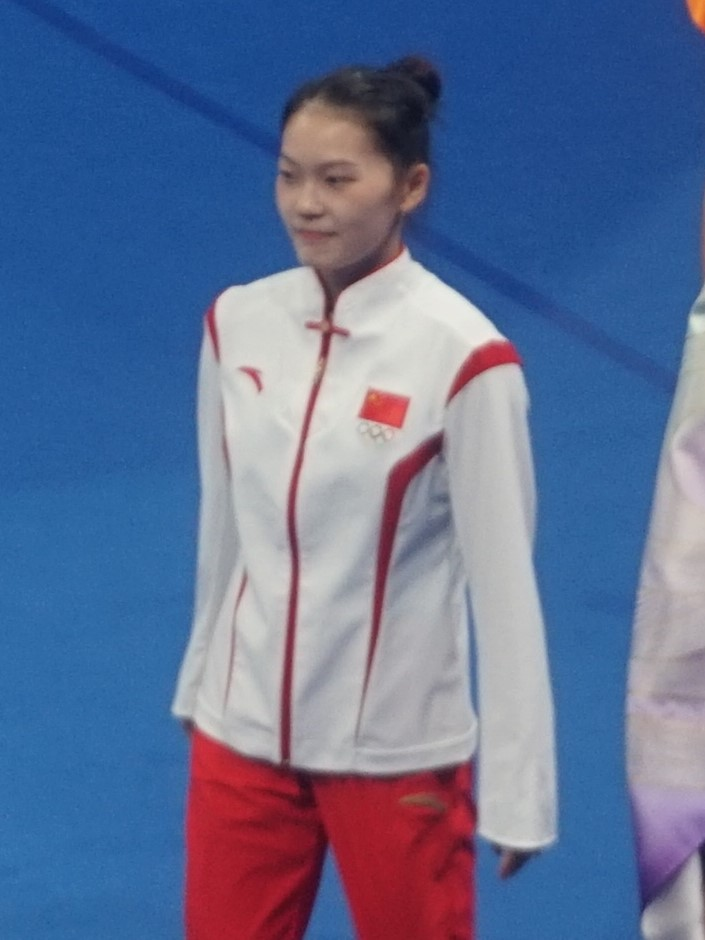
- Hu in 2023

Personal information
- Nickname: Doudou
- Born: 13 November 1998 (age 27) Huaihua, China

Gymnastics career
- Discipline: Trampoline gymnastics
- Country represented: China (2021 – present)
- Club: Shanxi Province
Medal record
Women's trampoline gymnastics
Representing China
World Championships
Gold medal – first place	2021 Baku	Synchro
Gold medal – first place	2022 Sofia	Individual team
Gold medal – first place	2023 Birmingham	Individual team
Gold medal – first place	2025 Pamplona	Individual
Gold medal – first place	2025 Pamplona	Individual team
Gold medal – first place	2025 Pamplona	All-qround team
Bronze medal – third place	2022 Sofia	Individual
Bronze medal – third place	2025 Pamplona	Synchro
Asian Games
Silver medal – second place	2022 Hangzhou	Individual

Hu Yicheng (Chinese: 胡译乘; pinyin: Hú Yìchéng; born 13 November 1998) is a Chinese trampoline gymnast. She is a six-time World champion and the 2022 Asian Games individual silver medalist. She represented China at the 2024 Summer Olympics and finished eighth in the trampoline final.

== Gymnastics career ==
Hu competing at the 2022 Asian Games

Hu began trampoline gymnastics when she was seven years old and joined the Shanxi Provincial team in 2012. She was not added to the Chinese national team until 2021 and is considered a "late bloomer".

Hu competed at the 2021 World Championships and won a gold medal in synchronized trampoline with partner Zhang Xinxin. Then at the 2022 World Championships, she won a gold medal in the individual team event alongside Cao Yunzhu, Zhu Xueying, and Fan Xinyi. She was also the top qualifier for the individual final, but she ultimately won the bronze medal behind Hikaru Mori and Bryony Page. She placed fourth in the synchro event with her partner Zhang Xinxin.

At the 2023 Santarem World Cup, Hu won the bronze medal in the individual event and the gold medal in the synchro event with Zhu Xueying. Then at the Coimbra World Cup, Hu and Zhu finished fourth in the synchro final. She then won the gold medal in the individual event at the Palm Beach World Cup thanks to having the highest execution score of the competition. Additionally, Hu and Zhu placed eighth in the synchro final. She won the silver medal behind Zhu at the Varna World Cup and placed seventh with Zhu in the synchro competition. Hu finished third overall in the 2023 World Cup rankings and third with Zhu in the synchro rankings.

Hu won the silver medal at the 2022 Asian Games, held in 2023 due to COVID-19 concerns, behind her teammate Zhu Xueying. She then competed at the 2023 World Championships and won a gold medal with the same Chinese team that won the title in 2022. She also placed fourth in the individual event, only 0.020 behind the bronze-medalist Jessica Stevens.

Hu finished fourth in the individual event at the 2024 Baku World Cup after qualifying for the final in first place. She also won the gold medal at the Cottbus World Cup and secured a berth for the 2024 Summer Olympics. At the 2024 Summer Olympics, Hu qualified in third place, but fell during the final, placing eighth.

Hu won four medals at the 2025 World Championships. She won the gold medal in the individual event by only 0.030 points ahead of Japan's Hikaru Mori, becoming China's first world champion in individual women's trampoline in a decade. She won a bronze medal in the synchro competition with partner Zhang Xinxin. She competed alongside Fan Xinyi, Qiu Zheng, and Zhu Xueying in the trampoline team event, and they won the gold medal. She also helped China win the gold medal in the all-around team medal.
