= Sarah Milette =

Canadian trampoline gymnast

- Born: April 11, 1997 (age 29)
- Height: 168 cm (5 ft 6 in)

Gymnastics career
- Discipline: Trampoline gymnastics
Medal record
Women's trampoline gymnastics
Representing Canada
World Games
| Bronze medal – third place | 2025 Chengdu | Synchro |
World Championships
| Silver medal – second place | 2018 Saint Petersburg | Synchro |
| Bronze medal – third place | 2018 Saint Petersburg | All-around Team |
| Bronze medal – third place | 2019 Tokyo | Individual Team |
Pan American Championships
| Gold medal – first place | 2016 Bogotá | Synchro |
| Gold medal – first place | 2016 Bogotá | Team |
| Gold medal – first place | 2018 Lima | Synchro |
| Silver medal – second place | 2016 Bogotá | Individual |

Sarah Milette (born April 11, 1997) is a Canadian trampoline gymnast. She has won three medals at the World Championships (bronze in the 2018 and 2019 team events, silver in the 2018 synchro event), a bronze medal in synchro at the 2025 World Games, and three golds at the Pan American Championships.

== Career ==
Milette began trampolining at five years old and started training competitively at age 14. She had a long-term goal to join the national team, which she accomplished in 2016. In 2015, she competed at the World Age Group Competition and placed 13th individually and 6th in the synchro event.

In 2016, Milette competed at the Pan American Championships, where she won three medals. She won silver in the individual event behind compatriot Sophiane Méthot, then together, they won the synchro event. The Canadian team also won the team final.

Milette attended her first senior World Championships in 2017, where she placed 33rd in the qualifiers and did not advance to the final. She also placed 5th in both the synchro and team finals.

In 2018, Milette and Rosie MacLennan competed on the FIG World Cup series as a synchro pair. At the stage in Loulé, Portugal, they went from 7th in the qualifiers to winning the competition. The pair won the silver medal in the women's synchro event at the 2018 Trampoline Gymnastics World Championships held in Saint Petersburg, Russia. Milette said the pair "did a safe routine which we both knew we could do really well." They were also part of the team that won bronze in the team event. In the individual event, Milette placed 55th in qualifiers.

The next year, she represented Canada at the 2019 Pan American Games in Lima, Peru in the women's individual event, where she placed 5th after qualifying to the final in first place. In November, at the 2019 World Championships held in Tokyo, Japan, she and her teammates Méthot, MacLennan, and Samantha Smith won the bronze medal in the women's team event with a score of 133.745. In the individual event, she advanced to the semi-final round and finished 21st there.

At the next World Championships, held in 2021, Milette qualified for the individual final for the first time and placed 8th. She finished 4th in both the team event and in synchro with Méthot. While it was her best personal finish, it was the first time in six years that Canada won no medals at the World Championships.

In 2022, she placed 10th in the individual semi-final round and 5th in the synchro event, and in 2023, where she did not compete in the synchro event, she finished 32nd in qualifications. Milette was the women's trampoline alternate for Canada for the 2024 Summer Olympics.

In 2025, Milette and her fellow competitors in Quebec began to put more emphasis on training synchro ahead of the 2025 World Games. Milette, competing with Sophiane Méthot, finished 7th at a World Cup in April, then won silver at another in July. In August, at the Games, they won bronze over the British team of Bryony Page and Isabelle Songhurst by 0.01 points. In September, they won their first World Cup in Cottbus, Germany, then went on to win a second in Antibes, France in October. Their success on the World Cup series led them to win the series title. At the 2025 World Championships, they ranked 21st in the qualification round. Milette advanced to the semi-finals in the individual event and placed 16th.

== Personal life ==
Milette studied psychology at the Université du Québec à Montréal.
