= Zhu Shouli =

Chinese trampoline gymnast

- Born: 3 September 1998 (age 28)

Gymnastics career
- Discipline: Trampoline gymnastics
Medal record
Women's trampoline gymnastics
Representing China
World Championships
Gold medal – first place	2018 Saint Petersburg	All-around Team
Asian Games
Bronze medal – third place	2018 Jakarta	Individual

Zhu Shouli (born 3 September 1998) is a female Chinese trampoline gymnast.

In 2018 she won the bronze medal in the women's individual event at the 2018 Asian Games held in Jakarta, Indonesia.
