= Abbie Watts =

Australian trampoline gymnast

- Born: 16 May 1997 (age 29) Western Australia

Gymnastics career
- Discipline: Trampoline gymnastics
- Country represented: Australia

Abbie Watts (born 16 May 1997) is an Australian individual trampoline gymnast, representing her nation at international competitions. Watts placed 6th at the 2014 Summer Youth Olympics. She competed at world championships, including at the 2015 Trampoline World Championships.

== Personal ==
Watts lives in Marmion, Australia.
