= Maddie Davidson =

New Zealand trampoline gymnast

- Full name: Madaline Davidson
- Nickname: Maddie
- Born: 8 January 1999 (age 27) Christchurch

Gymnastics career
- Discipline: Trampoline gymnastics
- Country represented: New Zealand
- Club: Olympia Gymnastic Sports
- Head coach: Alex Nilov

Madaline Davidson (born 8 January 1999) is a New Zealand trampoline gymnast. She competed at the 2020 Olympic Games and finished tenth in the qualification, making her the second reserve for the final. She is the first female trampolinist to represent New Zealand at the Olympics.

== Early life ==
Maddie Davidson was born on 8 January 1999 in Christchurch. Her parents enrolled her in trampoline classes after she began jumping on a family friend's backyard trampoline. She has trained at Olympia Gymnastic Sports in Christchurch under coach Alex Nilov since she began trampoline.

== Career ==
Davidson won the silver medal at the 2017 World Age Group Competition in the 17–21 age category.

=== 2018 ===
Davidson began competing with Alexa Kennedy in synchro competitions in 2018 despite the two living and training on opposite ends of the country. At the 2018 World Cup in Maebashi, the pair finished sixth, and Davidson finished 16th as an individual. Then at the 2018 World Championships in Saint Petersburg, Kennedy and Davidson finished 14th in the qualification round. Individually, Davidson qualified into the semifinals where she finished 13th.

=== 2019 ===
Davidson began the 2019 season with a 24th-place finish at the Baku World Cup. At the 2019 World Cup in Minsk, she won the bronze medal in the synchro event with Kennedy. They then finished fourth at the Khabarovsk World Cup. She only competed as an individual at the 2019 World Championships in Tokyo, and she only finished 42nd in the qualification round.

=== 2020–21 ===
Davidson placed 15th in the qualification round at the 2020 Baku World Cup, making her the third reserve for the final. She finished fourth at the 2021 World Cup in Brescia.

Davidson was selected to compete at the postponed 2020 Olympic Games, which made her the first female trampolinist to represent New Zealand at the Olympic Games. Gymnastics New Zealand chief executive Tony Compier remarked that her achievement was a "watershed moment ... one we hope will be inspirational to all young girls and women in our sport." At the Olympics, Davidson finished tenth in the qualification round with a total score of 93.140, which made her the second reserve for the final.

=== 2022–23 ===
Davidson won the silver medal in the individual event at the 2022 Coimbra World Cup. One week later, she won the bronze medal at the Arosa World Cup. She finished eighth at the 2022 World Championships.

At the 2023 Coimbra World Cup, Davidson finished 12th in the semifinals. She then finished eighth at the Palm Beach World Cup, and she placed 15th in the semifinals at the Varna World Cup. At the 2023 World Championships, she finished 14th in the qualification round and tenth in the semifinals, making her the first reserve for the final.

=== 2024 ===
Davidson began the 2024 season by finishing 11th in the semifinals at the Baku World Cup and was the second reserve for the final. She then placed sixth at the Cottbus World Cup. In April, Davidson was selected to represent New Zealand at the 2024 Summer Olympics.

== Personal life ==
To fund her training, Davidson works as a trampoline coach and also as a personal assistant for an accountant. As of 2024, she is dating fellow trampoline gymnast and Olympic medalist Dylan Schmidt.
