= Dafne Navarro =

Mexican trampoline gymnast (born 1996)

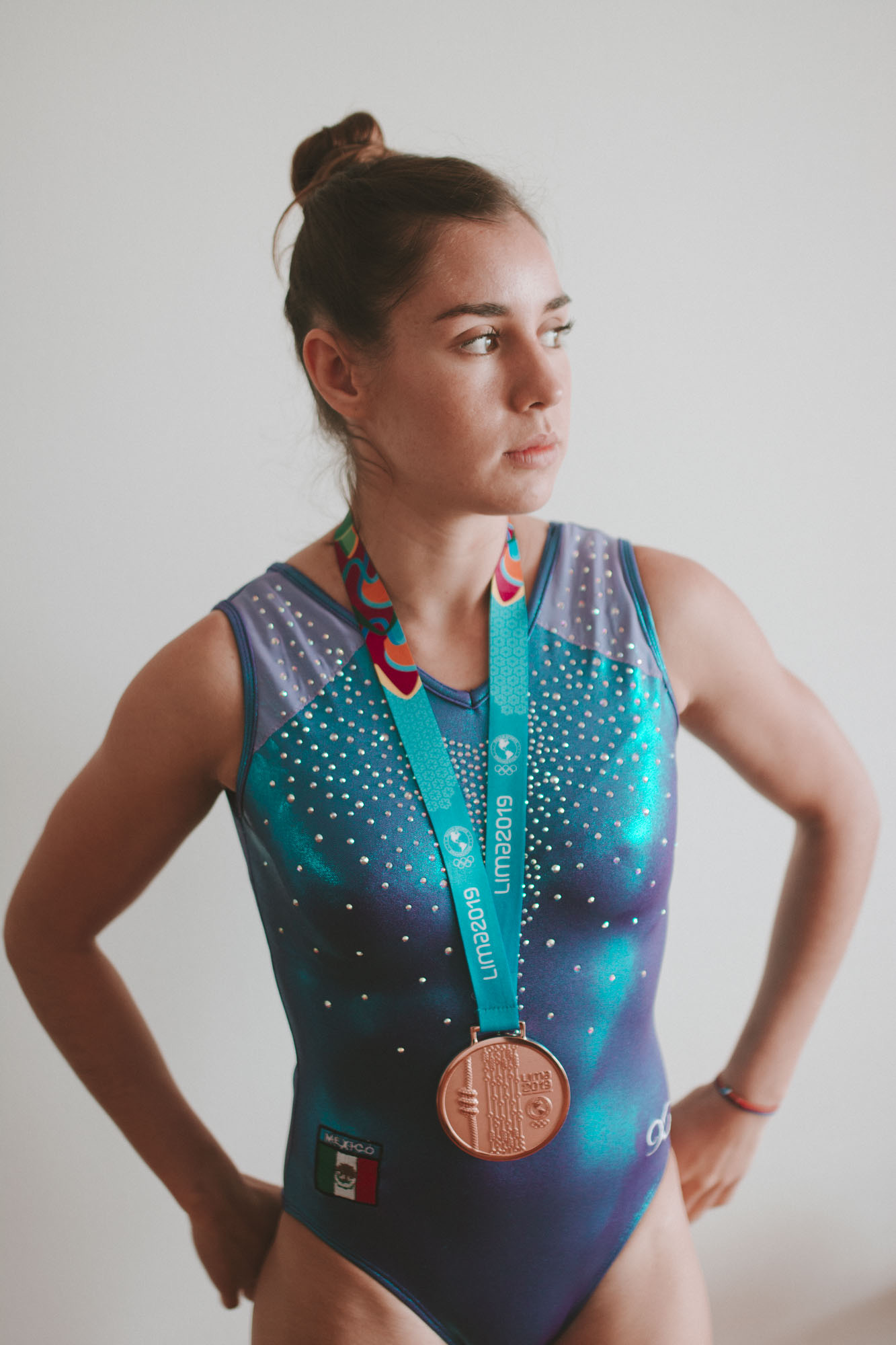

Personal information
- Full name: Dafne Carolina Navarro Loza
- Nickname: Caro
- Born: 30 January 1996 (age 30) Guadalajara, Jalisco, Mexico
- Height: 156 cm (5 ft 1 in)

Gymnastics career
- Discipline: Trampoline gymnastics
- Club: Jalisco State
- Head coach: Raul Lopez Garcia
Medal record
Women's trampoline gymnastics
Representing Mexico
World Championships
| Bronze medal – third place | 2018 Saint Petersburg | Synchro |
| Bronze medal – third place | 2022 Sofia | Synchro |
Pan American Games
| Silver medal – second place | 2015 Toronto | Individual |
| Bronze medal – third place | 2019 Lima | Individual |
| Bronze medal – third place | 2023 Santiago | Individual |
| Bronze medal – third place | 2023 Santiago | Synchro |
Pan American Championships
| Gold medal – first place | 2022 Rio de Janeiro | Team |
| Silver medal – second place | 2014 Mississauga | Team |
| Silver medal – second place | 2016 Bogota | Team |
| Silver medal – second place | 2022 Rio de Janeiro | Synchro |
| Bronze medal – third place | 2018 Lima | Team |
| Bronze medal – third place | 2022 Rio de Janeiro | Individual |
Central American and Caribbean Games
| Gold medal – first place | 2018 Barranquilla | Individual |

Dafne Carolina Navarro Loza (born 30 January 1996) is a Mexican trampoline gymnast. She is the 2018 and 2022 World synchro bronze medalist and was Mexico's first World medalist in trampoline. As an individual, she became Mexico's first Pan American Games medalist in trampoline when she won the silver medal at the 2015 Pan American Games, and she won the bronze medal at the 2019 Pan American Games. She competed at the 2020 Olympic Games, becoming the first trampoline gymnast to represent Mexico at the Olympics.

== Career ==
Navarro began artistic gymnastics when she was nine years old, but she switched to trampolining three years later.

Navarro competed at the 2014 Pacific Rim Championships, helping the Mexican team finish fourth and placing fifth as an individual. She won a silver medal with the Mexican team at the 2014 Pan American Championships and finished sixth individually. She then competed at the Minsk World Cup and finished nineteenth in the individual event. She finished twenty-ninth in the qualification round at the 2014 World Championships.

Navarro represented Mexico at the 2015 Pan American Games and won the silver medal in the individual event behind the defending Olympic champion, Rosie MacLennan. This marked the first time Mexico won a Pan American Games medal in trampoline. She then finished thirty-second in the qualification round at the 2015 World Championships. She helped the Mexican team win the silver medal behind Canada at the 2016 Pan American Championships. At the 2017 World Championships, she finished thirtieth in the individual qualification round and fourteenth with Melissa Flores in the synchro qualification round.

Navarro won the gold medal in the individual event at the 2018 Central American and Caribbean Games. Then at the Pan American Championships, she finished fourth in the individual event and won the team bronze medal. She then competed at the 2018 World Championships held in Saint Petersburg, Russia. In the individual event, she finished seventh in the qualification round and qualified for the semifinals. She ultimately finished sixteenth in the semifinals. Navarro and Melissa Flores qualified for the synchro final in seventh place. Then in the final, they won the bronze medal and Mexico's first-ever medal at the Trampoline Gymnastics World Championships.

Navarro finished eighteenth individually and in the synchro event at the 2019 Baku World Cup. She then finished twelfth at the Minsk World Cup. She won the bronze medal at the 2019 Pan American Games behind Samantha Smith and Nicole Ahsinger. She finished seventh individually at the Khabarovsk World Cup. She finished sixteenth in both the individual semifinal and the synchro qualification round at the 2019 World Championships. She earned enough points during the 2019–21 Trampoline World Cup series to qualify for the 2020 Olympic Games.

Navarro finished eleventh at the 2021 Brescia World Cup. She then represented Mexico at the postponed-2020 Olympics and became the first Mexican to compete in Olympic trampolining. She qualified for the individual final where she finished in eighth place.

Navarro helped the Mexican team win the gold medal at the 2022 Pan American Championships. She also won the bronze medal in the individual event and silver in the synchro event with Michelle Mares. She competed at the 2022 World Championships in Sofia. In the individual event, she finished twenty-seventh during the qualification round and was the first reserve for the semifinals. She competed in the synchro event with Mariola Garcia and won the bronze medal.
