= Megu Uyama =

Japanese trampoline gymnast (born 1996)

- Born: 14 January 1996 (age 30) Kanazawa, Japan
- Height: 1.58 m (5 ft 2 in)

Gymnastics career
- Discipline: Trampoline gymnastics
- Country represented: Japan
- Club: Sports Club Tenforty
- Head coach: Toshio Harada
Medal record
Representing Japan
World Championships
Gold medal – first place	2018 Saint Petersburg	Synchro
Gold medal – first place	2019 Tokyo	Individual Team
Gold medal – first place	2022 Sofia	Synchro
Bronze medal – third place	2022 Sofia	Individual Team

Megu Uyama (宇山芽紅, born 14 January 1996) is a Japanese gymnast specialised in synchronised trampoline, who has represented her country at six World Championships, as well as the 2018 Asian Games. She is a three-time World champion, and she competed at the 2020 Summer Olympics.

== Career ==
At the 2014 Asian Championships, Uyama won the individual bronze medal. She competed with Ayana Yamada in the synchro event at the 2016 Coimbra World Cup, and they won the silver medal.

Uyama represented Japan at the 2018 Asian Games and placed fourth in the individual final. She was not initially selected to compete at the 2018 World Championships, but she stepped in a month before for the injured Yumi Takagi. She only had five training sessions with synchro partner Hikaru Mori before they became the World champions. They became the first female gymnasts from Japan to win a World Championship gold in trampolining. She also competed in the individual event and advanced to the final, finishing eighth.

Uyama was part of the Japanese women's team at the 2019 World Championships that won the gold medal for the first time ever. She was selected to represent Japan at the 2020 Summer Olympics. She qualified to the individual trampoline final where she finished fifth.

At the 2022 World Championships, Uyama teamed back up with Mori to win their second World title together. Additionally, she helped Japan win the bronze medal in the team event. Uyama and Mori competed together at the 2023 World Championships, and they finished fourth in the synchro final.

== Personal life ==
Uyama graduated from Kanazawa Gakuin University with a degree in Sport Studies in 2018. Following her graduation, she began coaching junior gymnasts at her club.
