= 2018 Trampoline Gymnastics World Championships =

2018 Trampoline World Championships
- Venue: Saint Petersburg Sports and Concert Complex
- Location: Saint Petersburg, Russia
- Start date: 7 November 2018
- End date: 10 November 2018

The 33rd Trampoline Gymnastics World Championships were held in Saint Petersburg, Russia, from November 7–10, 2018.

== Medal table ==
Rank	Nation	Gold	Silver	Bronze	Total
1	China (CHN)	3	2	1	6
2	Russia (RUS)	2	0	3	5
3	Canada (CAN)	1	1	1	3
4	Belarus (BLR)	1	0	0	1
4	Japan (JPN)	1	0	0	1
4	Sweden (SWE)	1	0	0	1
7	Great Britain (GBR)	0	2	0	2
8	United States (USA)	0	1	1	2
9	France (FRA)	0	1	0	1
9	Portugal (POR)	0	1	0	1
9	Spain (ESP)	0	1	0	1
12	Argentina (ARG)	0	0	1	1
12	Australia (AUS)	0	0	1	1
12	Mexico (MEX)	0	0	1	1
Totals (14 entries)		9	9	9	27

== Medallists ==
Event	Gold	Silver	Bronze
Men
Individual	Gao Lei (CHN)	Dong Dong (CHN)	Andrey Yudin (RUS)
Synchro	Belarus; Uladzislau Hancharou; Aleh Rabtsau	France; Sébastien Martiny; Allan Morante	Australia; Ty Swadling; Dominic Clarke
Double Mini	Mikhail Zalomin (RUS)	Ruben Padilla (USA)	Lucas Adorno (ARG)
Tumbling	Vadim Afanasev (RUS)	Elliott Browne (GBR)	Zhang Kuo (CHN)
Women
Individual	Rosie MacLennan (CAN)	Zhu Xueying (CHN)	Yana Pavlova (RUS)
Synchro	Japan; Hikaru Mori; Megu Uyama	Canada; Rosie MacLennan; Sarah Milette	Mexico; Dafne Navarro Loza; Melissa Flores
Double Mini	Lina Sjöberg (SWE)	Melania Rodríguez (ESP)	Kristle Lowell (USA)
Tumbling	Jia Fangfang (CHN)	Shanice Davidson (GBR)	Viktoriia Danilenko (RUS)
Mixed
All-around Team	China; Dong Dong; Feng Baoyi; Gao Lei; Jia Fangfang; Tu Xiao; Zeng Linglong; Zhang Kuo; Zhu Shouli; Zhu Xueying	Portugal; Diogo Abreu; Mafalda Brás; Mariana Carvalho; Diogo Carvalho; Pedro Ferreira; Diogo Ganchinho; Nicole Pacheco; Raquel Pinto; Diogo Vilela	Canada; Jason Burnett; Jérémy Chartier; Michael Chaves; Jake Cranham; Zoe Hipel; Rosie MacLennan; Sarah Milette; Laurence Roux; Jon Schwaiger

== Results ==
=== Mixed Team All-around ===
==== Qualification ====
Rank	Gymnast(s)	Discipline	Score 1	Score 2	Total Score
1	China				682.195 Q
1	Zeng Linglong	Double Mini Men	33.000	33.800	66.800
1	Feng Baoyi	Double Mini Women	32.100	32.700	64.800
1	Gao Lei	Trampoline Men	53.475	61.225	114.700
1	Zhu Xueying	Trampoline Women	49.880	56.545	106.425
1	Zhang Kuo	Tumbling Men	37.700	37.900	75.600
1	Jia Fangfang	Tumbling Women	34.800	36.800	71.600
1	Tu Xiao; Dong Dong	Synchro Men	42.560	52.370	94.930
1	Zhu Shouli; Zhu Xueying	Synchro Women	41.000	46.340	87.340
2	Russia				664.690 Q
2	Mikhail Zalomin	Double Mini Men	38.500	37.800	76.300
2	Polina Troianova	Double Mini Women	33.600	34.600	68.200
2	Dmitrii Ushakov	Trampoline Men	53.090	60.590	113.680
2	Yana Pavlova	Trampoline Women	50.290	56.890	107.180
2	Vadim Afanasev	Tumbling Men	38.200	39.600	77.800
2	Viktoriia Danilenko	Tumbling Women	34.800	32.500	67.300
2	Mikhail Melnik; Sergei Azarian	Synchro Men	42.970	51.400	94.370
2	Yana Pavlova; Irina Kundius	Synchro Women	13.150	46.710	59.860
3	United States				664.250 Q
3	Ruben Padilla	Double Mini Men	37.300	35.800	73.100
3	Tristan van Natta	Double Mini Women	34.500	35.300	69.800
3	Cody Gesuelli	Trampoline Men	49.365	56.480	105.845
3	Nicole Ahsinger	Trampoline Women	47.080	52.085	99.165
3	Kaden Brown	Tumbling Men	38.300	36.900	75.200
3	Hope Bravo	Tumbling Women	33.000	32.400	65.400
3	Cody Gesuelli; Joseph Isenberg	Synchro Men	41.600	48.260	89.860
3	Nicole Ahsinger; Cheyenne Webster	Synchro Women	39.390	46.490	85.880
4	Canada				656.790 Q
4	Jon Schwaiger	Double Mini Men	35.200	35.900	71.100
4	Laurence Roux	Double Mini Women	35.200	34.000	69.200
4	Jérémy Chartier	Trampoline Men	49.845	57.025	106.870
4	Rosie MacLennan	Trampoline Women	49.355	54.715	104.070
4	Michael Chaves	Tumbling Men	32.100	34.300	66.400
4	Zoe Hipel	Tumbling Women	29.900	32.200	62.100
4	Jason Burnett; Jake Cranham	Synchro Men	41.630	47.930	89.560
4	Rosie MacLennan; Sarah Milette	Synchro Women	40.860	46.630	87.490
5	Portugal				623.980 Q
5	Diogo Carvalho	Double Mini Men	34.900	37.800	72.700
5	Mafalda Brás	Double Mini Women	33.500	34.700	68.200
5	Diogo Abreu	Trampoline Men	52.580	58.480	111.060
5	Mariana Carvalho	Trampoline Women	46.385	49.405	95.790
5	Diogo Vilela	Tumbling Men	34.300	32.200	66.500
5	Raquel Pinto	Tumbling Women	33.500	33.100	66.600
5	Diogo Ganchinho; Pedro Ferreira	Synchro Men	42.370	48.910	91.280
5	Nicole Pacheco; Mariana Carvalho	Synchro Women	39.110	12.740	51.850

==== Final ====
Rank	Gymnast(s)	Discipline	Score	Team point
1st place, gold medalist(s)	China		351.920	27
1st place, gold medalist(s)	Zeng Linglong	Double Mini Men	35.000	1
1st place, gold medalist(s)	Feng Baoyi	Double Mini Women	32.600	1
1st place, gold medalist(s)	Gao Lei	Trampoline Men	59.900	5
1st place, gold medalist(s)	Zhu Xueying	Trampoline Women	56.430	4
1st place, gold medalist(s)	Zhang Kuo	Tumbling Men	36.200	3
1st place, gold medalist(s)	Jia Fangfang	Tumbling Women	36.300	5
1st place, gold medalist(s)	Tu Xiao; Dong Dong	Synchro Men	50.860	5
1st place, gold medalist(s)	Zhu Shouli; Zhu Xueying	Synchro Women	44.630	3
2nd place, silver medalist(s)	Portugal		340.845	24
2nd place, silver medalist(s)	Diogo Carvalho	Double Mini Men	39.600	4
2nd place, silver medalist(s)	Mafalda Brás	Double Mini Women	33.600	3
2nd place, silver medalist(s)	Diogo Abreu	Trampoline Men	59.530	4
2nd place, silver medalist(s)	Mariana Carvalho	Trampoline Women	51.955	2
2nd place, silver medalist(s)	Diogo Vilela	Tumbling Men	28.500	1
2nd place, silver medalist(s)	Raquel Pinto	Tumbling Women	32.800	4
2nd place, silver medalist(s)	Diogo Ganchinho; Pedro Ferreira	Synchro Men	50.380	4
2nd place, silver medalist(s)	Nicole Pacheco; Mariana Carvalho	Synchro Women	44.480	2
3rd place, bronze medalist(s)	Canada		338.445	24
3rd place, bronze medalist(s)	Jon Schwaiger	Double Mini Men	35.600	3
3rd place, bronze medalist(s)	Laurence Roux	Double Mini Women	33.000	2
3rd place, bronze medalist(s)	Jérémy Chartier	Trampoline Men	57.070	2
3rd place, bronze medalist(s)	Rosie MacLennan	Trampoline Women	56.565	5
3rd place, bronze medalist(s)	Michael Chaves	Tumbling Men	34.800	2
3rd place, bronze medalist(s)	Zoe Hipel	Tumbling Women	32.200	2
3rd place, bronze medalist(s)	Jason Burnett; Jake Cranham	Synchro Men	42.260	3
3rd place, bronze medalist(s)	Rosie MacLennan; Sarah Milette	Synchro Women	46.950	5
4	United States		310.975	24
4	Ruben Padilla	Double Mini Men	36.400	2
4	Tristan van Natta	Double Mini Women	34.000	5
4	Cody Gesuelli	Trampoline Men	56.255	1
4	Nicole Ahsinger	Trampoline Women	53.180	3
4	Kaden Brown	Tumbling Men	38.000	5
4	Hope Bravo	Tumbling Women	32.400	3
4	Cody Gesuelli; Joseph Isenberg	Synchro Men	15.560	1
4	Nicole Ahsinger; Cheyenne Webster	Synchro Women	45.180	4
5	Russia		274.410	21
5	Mikhail Zalomin	Double Mini Men	39.700	5
5	Polina Troianova	Double Mini Women	33.800	4
5	Dmitrii Ushakov	Trampoline Men	57.200	3
5	Yana Pavlova	Trampoline Women	23.770	1
5	Vadim Afanasev	Tumbling Men	36.800	4
5	Viktoriia Danilenko	Tumbling Women	29.800	1
5	Mikhail Melnik; Sergei Azarian	Synchro Men	24.030	2
5	Yana Pavlova; Irina Kundius	Synchro Women	29.310	1
