= Malak Hamza =

Egyptian trampoline gymnast

- Born: 5 November 2001 (age 24) Giza, Egypt

Gymnastics career
- Discipline: Trampoline gymnastics
- Country represented: Egypt
- Club: Gezira Sporting Club
- Head coaches: Seif Asser Sherif, Sergei Marchenko
Medal record
Representing Egypt
Trampolining
African Championships
Gold medal – first place	2018 Cairo	Team
Gold medal – first place	2018 Cairo	Synchro
Gold medal – first place	2021 Cairo	Individual
Gold medal – first place	2024 Bizerte	Individual
Silver medal – second place	2018 Cairo	Individual

Malak Hamza (born 5 November 2001) is an Egyptian trampoline gymnast. She competed in the 2020 Summer Olympics and has qualified for the 2024 Summer Olympics.

== Early life ==
Hamza was born in Giza in 2001. She started as an artistic gymnast at age four, but when she was 13, she switched to trampoline.

== Career ==
Hamza placed 68th as an individual and 14th in the synchro event with Mariam Elbeialy at the 2017 World Age Group Competition in the 15-16 age division. She then won the synchro title with partner Khadiga Aly at the 2018 African Championships and also won the silver medal in the individual event. At the 2018 World Age Group Competition, she finished 49th in the individual competition and 19th with Elbeialy in the 17-21 age division.

Hamza finished 54th individually at the 2019 Valladolid World Cup. At the 2019 World Championships, she finished 62nd out of the 79 competitors in the individual event.

Hamza won the individual title at the 2021 African Championships and earned the continental berth for the Olympic Games. At the Olympic Games in Tokyo, she placed ninth in the qualification round and was the first reserve for the final.

Hamza competed at the 2022 World Championships where she finished 58th as an individual. She placed 19th at the 2023 Baku World Cup. She then finished 62nd at the 2023 Coimbra World Cup.

At the 2024 African Championships, Hamza won the individual title and earned the continental berth for the Olympic Games.

== Personal life ==
Hamza graduated from Nile University with a business degree. She speaks Arabic and English.
