= Alice Gomes =

Brazilian trampoline gymnast

- Full name: Alice Hellen Gomes
- Born: 20 March 1999 (age 27) Belo Horizonte, Brazil

Gymnastics career
- Discipline: Trampoline gymnastics
- Country represented: Brazil
Medal record
Women's trampoline gymnastics
Representing Brazil
Pan American Games
Silver medal – second place	2023 Santiago	Synchro
Pan American Championships
Gold medal – first place	2021 Rio de Janeiro	Synchro
Gold medal – first place	2022 Rio de Janeiro	Synchro
Silver medal – second place	2022 Rio de Janeiro	Individual
Silver medal – second place	2022 Rio de Janeiro	Team
Silver medal – second place	2023 Monterrey	Synchro
Bronze medal – third place	2023 Monterrey	Team
South American Games
Silver medal – second place	2022 Asunción	Individual
South American Championships
Silver medal – second place	2017 Paipa	Team
Silver medal – second place	2019 Paipa	Individual
Bronze medal – third place	2019 Paipa	Team

Alice Gomes (born 20 March 1999) is a Brazilian individual and synchronized trampoline gymnast, representing her nation at international competitions. She competed at world championships, including at the 2023 Trampoline Gymnastics World Championships, where she obtained an individual non-nominative Olympic quota for Brazil in women's trampoline for the 2024 Summer Olympics.

She finished 6th at the 2023 Trampoline Gymnastics World Championships.

In 2023, she was also number 1 in the world in doubles together with Camilla Gomes.

In March 2024, she won the silver medal at the Alkmaar stage of the trampoline gymnastics World Cup. She was only the third Brazilian athlete to stand on the podium in the individual event of a World Cup stage.
