= Liu Lingling (gymnast) =

Chinese trampoline gymnast

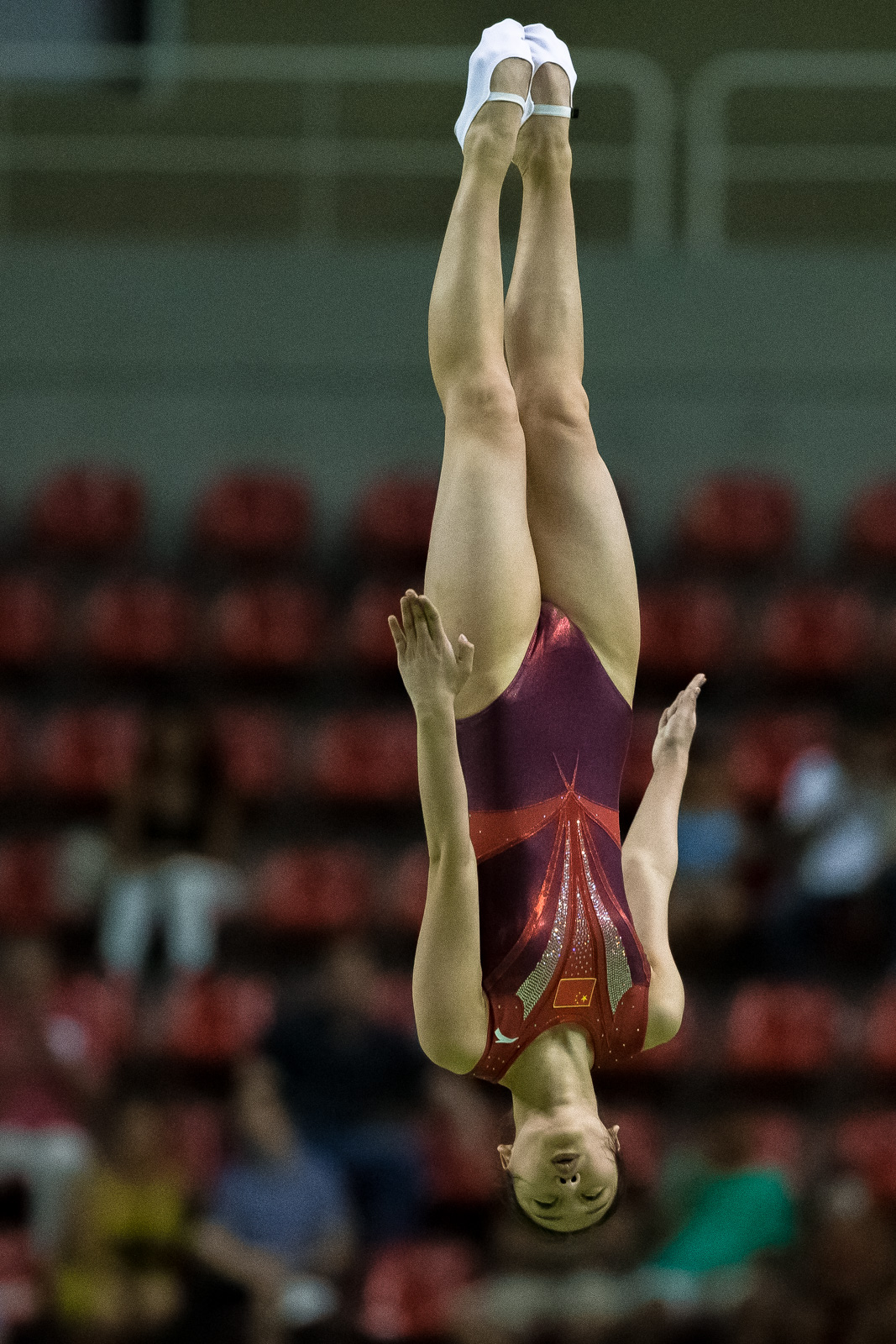
- Liu competing at the 2016 Olympic Test Event

Personal information
- Born: 8 November 1994 (age 31) Fuzhou, China
- Height: 165 cm (5 ft 5 in)

Gymnastics career
- Discipline: Trampoline gymnastics
- Club: Fujian Province
Medal record
Women's trampoline gymnastics
Representing China
Olympic Games
Silver medal – second place	2020 Tokyo	Individual
World Championships
Gold medal – first place	2014 Daytona Beach	Individual
Gold medal – first place	2014 Daytona Beach	Synchro
Gold medal – first place	2015 Odense	Trampoline team
Gold medal – first place	2017 Sofia	Trampoline team
Silver medal – second place	2015 Odense	Individual
Asian Games
Gold medal – first place	2018 Jakarta	Individual

Liu Lingling (Chinese: 刘灵玲; born 8 November 1994) is a Chinese trampoline gymnast. She is the 2020 Olympic silver medalist and the 2014 World champion in the individual event. She is also the 2014 World champion in synchronized trampoline. She won the individual gold medal at the 2018 Asian Games.

== Gymnastics career ==
Liu started trampoline gymnastics at age five and joined the national team in 2009. At the 2014 Pacific Rim Championships, she won the silver medal in the individual event behind Rosie MacLennan. She had her first major international success at the 2014 World Championships where she upset MacLennan to win the individual title. She also won a gold medal in the synchro event with partner Li Meng.

Liu won a gold medal in the synchro event with Li Meng at the Mouilleron World Cup after failing to advance beyond the qualifying round in the individual event. Then at the 2015 World Championships, she won a silver medal in the individual event behind teammate Li Dan. She also helped the Chinese women's trampoline team win the gold medal. At the 2016 Olympic Test Event, she won the individual gold medal. She was not selected for China's 2016 Olympic team due to a foot injury.

At the 2017 World Championships, Liu won a gold medal in the team event alongside Zhong Xingping and Zhu Xueying. She won the gold medal in the individual event at the 2018 Asian Games. At the 2019 Baku World Cup, she beat the reigning World and Olympic champion MacLennan to win the gold medal. She continued to compete in the 2019 season despite an ongoing hip injury. She won the gold medal at the 2019 Valladolid World Cup.

Liu won the silver medal at the 2020 Baku World Cup behind teammate Zhu Xueying. She was selected to represent China at the 2020 Summer Olympics and entered as one of the favorites to win. She won the silver medal in the individual final behind Zhu. She opted to not compete at the 2021 World Championships.
