= Aliaksei Shostak =

American trampoline gymnast

- Аляксей Шостак
- Born: February 8, 1995 (age 31) Minsk, Belarus

Gymnastics career
- Discipline: Trampoline gymnastics
- Country represented: United States
- Head coach: Dmitri Poliaroush
Medal record
Men's trampoline gymnastics
Representing United States
World Championships
Gold medal – first place	2023 Birmingham	All-around Team
Silver medal – second place	2019 Tokyo	All-around Team
Silver medal – second place	2022 Sofia	All-around Team
Silver medal – second place	2023 Birmingham	Synchro
Pan American Games
Gold medal – first place	2023 Santiago	Synchronized
Pan American Championships
Silver medal – second place	2014 Mississauga	Synchro
Silver medal – second place	2014 Mississauga	Team
Silver medal – second place	2026 Medellin	Individual
Bronze medal – third place	2026 Medellin	Team

Aliaksei Aliaksandravich Shostak (Note: Belarusian: Аляксей Аляксандравіч Шостак) (/əˈlɛksi ˈʃoʊstɑːk/ ə-LEK-see SHOH-stahk; born February 8, 1995) is an American trampoline gymnast. He represented the United States at the 2020 and 2024 Summer Olympics. He is the son of Belarusian Olympian Aleksandr Shostak.

== Gymnastics career ==
=== National competition ===
Shostak has competed at six USA Gymnastics Championships. In 2014 he won silver in the synchro competition with Jeffrey Gluckstein. In 2015 he won bronze in the synchro competition with Gluckstein. In 2016 he won bronze in the synchro competition with Gluckstein. In 2017 he won gold in the synchro competition with Gluckstein. In 2018 he won silver on trampoline. In 2019, he won silver on trampoline.

=== International competition ===
In October 2015, Shostak competed at the 2015 World Cup, where he won bronze in the synchro competition with Jeffrey Gluckstein. In May 2016, he competed at the 2016 Shanghai World Cup, where he won bronze in the synchro competition with Gluckstein. In July 2017, he competed at the 2017 World Games, where he finished in fifth place in the synchro competition.

In October 2018, he competed at the 2018 Loule World Cup. In April 2019, he competed at the 2019 Minsk World Cup, where he finished in fourth place in the synchro competition. In June 2021, he competed at the 2021 Brescia World Cup where he won bronze in the synchro competition with Gluckstein.

Shostak has represented the United States at six World Championships. At the 2019 Trampoline Gymnastics World Championships, he finished in fifth place in the synchro competition, and won silver in the team all-around. As the top American finisher at the 2019 World Championships, he was named to team USA at the 2020 Summer Olympics. The games were postponed until 2021, where Shostak competed but did not qualify for the finals.

On June 26, 2024, Shostak was named to team USA's roster to compete at the 2024 Summer Olympics. During the men's trampoline event he scored 57.350 during his first routine, and fell during his second routine in the preliminary round. He finished in tenth place and did not advance to the final.

=== World Cup results ===
World Cup
Year	Place	Medal	Proof	Ref
2024	Coimbra (Portugal)	Silver	Synchronized	
