= Zhu Xueying =

Chinese trampoline gymnast

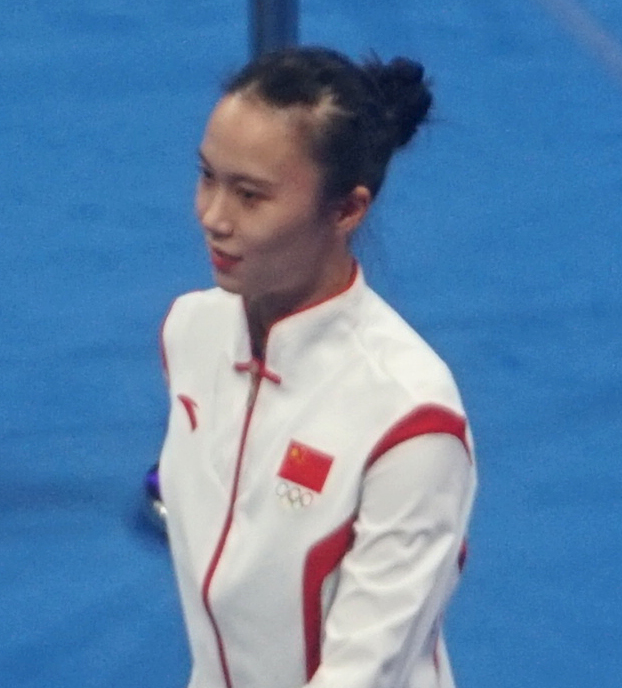
- Zhu at the 2022 Asian Games

Personal information
- Born: 2 March 1998 (age 28) Beijing, China
- Height: 163 cm (5 ft 4 in)

Gymnastics career
- Discipline: Trampoline gymnastics
- Country represented: China
Medal record
Women's trampoline gymnastics
Representing China
Olympic Games
Gold medal – first place	2020 Tokyo	Individual
World Championships
Gold medal – first place	2017 Sofia	Synchro
Gold medal – first place	2017 Sofia	Trampoline team
Gold medal – first place	2018 Saint Petersburg	All-around team
Gold medal – first place	2022 Sofia	Individual team
Gold medal – first place	2023 Birmingham	Individual team
Gold medal – first place	2025 Pamplona	Individual team
Gold medal – first place	2026 Nanjing	Individual
Gold medal – first place	2026 Nanjing	Individual team
Silver medal – second place	2018 Saint Petersburg	Individual
Silver medal – second place	2023 Birmingham	Individual
Summer Youth Olympics
Gold medal – first place	2014 Nanjing	Individual
Asian Games
Gold medal – first place	2022 Hangzhou	Individual

Zhu Xueying (born 2 March 1998) is a Chinese trampoline gymnast. She is the 2020 Olympic champion, the 2022 Asian Games champion, and the 2014 Youth Olympic champion in the individual event. Additionally, she has won six gold medals and two silver medals at the World Championships. She represented China at the 2024 Summer Olympics and finished fourth.

== Career ==
Zhu began gymnastics at a young age and began the trampoline discipline at age 10.

=== 2014–2017 ===
Zhu won the junior individual title at the 2014 Asian Championships held in Tokyo. She then won the gold medal in the girls' trampoline event at the 2014 Summer Youth Olympics held in Nanjing, China.

At the 2016 Arosa World Cup, Zhu won silver medals in the individual event and in the synchro event alongside Li Meng. She won her first World Cup title at the 2017 Valladolid World Cup, where she also won a silver medal in synchro with Zhu Shouli. She then competed with Zhong Xingping at the 2017 World Championships, and they won the gold medal in the synchro event. Additionally, Zhu, Zhong, and Liu Lingling won the gold medal in the trampoline team event.

=== 2018–2019 ===
Zhu won the synchro gold medal alongside Zhu Shouli at the 2018 Brescia World Cup. She then won the individual event at the Maebashi World Cup. She also won the individual event at the Loulé World Cup and also placed seventh in synchro with Zhu Shouli. At the 2018 World Championships, she won the silver medal in the individual event behind Canada's Rosie MacLennan. She also won a gold medal with the Chinese team in the all-around team competition, which was held for the first time that year.

Zhu won the individual event at the 2019 Minsk World Cup. Then at the Valladolid World Cup, she won the silver medal behind teammate Liu Lingling.

=== 2020–2022 ===
Zhu won the individual event at the 2020 Baku World Cup. On 30 July 2021, she won the gold medal in the women's trampoline event at the 2020 Summer Olympics in Tokyo, Japan. With a score of 56.635, she became the second Chinese athlete to win the gold medal in this event. She opted to not compete at the 2021 World Championships.

Zhu did not compete at the beginning of the 2022 season and returned to international competition for the first time since the Olympics at the 2022 World Championships. There, she helped the Chinese women's trampoline team win the gold medal. She finished fourth in the individual event, only 0.020 points behind the bronze medalist.

=== 2023–2025 ===
Zhu competed at the 2023 Santarem World Cup, her first FIG World Cup event in three years. There, she won a gold medal in the individual event and another gold medal in the synchro event alongside Hu Yicheng. She then won the silver medal at the Coimbra World Cup behind Bryony Page. Additionally, Zhu and Hu finished fourth in the synchro final. She won the bronze medal at the Palm Beach World Cup behind Hu and Page, and Zhu and Hu placed eighth in the synchro final. At the Varna World Cup, she won the gold medal in the individual event and placed seventh with Hu in the synchro event.

Zhu won the gold medal at the 2022 Asian Games, held in 2023 due to COVID-19 concerns. She then competed at the 2023 World Championships, helping China defend its team title. She won the silver medal in the individual event, behind Page.

Zhu won the individual gold medal at the 2024 Baku World Cup. She then lost by half a point to teammate Hu at the Cottbus World Cup. At the 2024 Summer Olympics, Zhu qualified for the final in first place. However, she placed fourth in the final after being off center in her second routine.

At the 2025 World Championships, she competed alongside Fan Xinyi, Qiu Zheng, and Hu in the trampoline team event, and they won the gold medal.
