= Nicole Ahsinger =

American trampoline gymnast (born 1998)

- Born: May 12, 1998 (age 28) San Diego, California, U.S.
- Height: 5 ft 3 in (160 cm)

Gymnastics career
- Discipline: Trampoline gymnastics
- Country represented: United States (2010–present)
- Training location: Lafayette, Louisiana
- Club: Trampoline and Tumbling Express
- Head coach: Dmitri Poliaroush
Medal record
Women's trampoline gymnastics
Representing the United States
World Championships
Gold medal – first place	2023 Birmingham	All-around team
Silver medal – second place	2019 Tokyo	All-around team
Silver medal – second place	2022 Sofia	All-around team
Pan American Games
Gold medal – first place	2023 Santiago	Synchronized
Silver medal – second place	2019 Lima	Individual
Pan American Championships
Gold medal – first place	2018 Lima	Team
Silver medal – second place	2018 Lima	Individual
Silver medal – second place	2018 Lima	Synchro

Nicole Ahsinger (born May 12, 1998) is an American individual and synchronised trampoline gymnast. She is a three-time World Championships medalist. She is the 2023 Pan American Games in synchro and the 2019 Pan American Games individual silver medalist. She is a 2016 and 2020 Olympian and was an alternate for the 2024 Summer Olympics. She is a three-time national champion in the individual event.

== Career ==
Ahsinger began trampoline gymnastics when she was three years old. She competed at the 2014 Summer Youth Olympics and advanced to the individual trampoline final, finishing fifth.

Ahsinger was not considered the favorite to be selected to represent the United States at the 2016 Summer Olympics, but after Charlotte Drury injured her ankle and was unable to compete at the Olympic Trials, Ahsinger was selected. She finished 15th in the qualification round. At 18 years old, she was the youngest trampoline gymnast competing at these Olympic Games.

Ahsinger won a silver medal with synchro partner Cheyenne Webster at the 2018 Loulé World Cup. At the 2018 Pan American Championships, she won the silver medal in the individual event behind Canada's Sophiane Méthot. She also won a silver medal in the synchro event, and the United States won team gold. She represented the United States at the 2019 Pan American Games and won the individual silver medal to Canada's Samantha Smith. She won a silver medal in the mixed team competition at the 2019 World Championships. At the 2020 Baku World Cup, she competed with Jessica Stevens and won a bronze medal in the synchro competition.

Ahsinger won the individual title at the 2021 USA Gymnastics Championships and was selected to compete at the postponed Olympics in Tokyo. At the 2020 Summer Olympics, she finished in sixth place in the final round, matching the best-ever Olympic placement of any U.S. trampoline gymnast.

Ahsinger and Sarah Webster won a silver medal in the synchro event at the 2022 Rimini World Cup. They then won the gold medal at the Arosa World Cup. She helped the United States win the team all-around silver medal at the 2022 World Championships.

At the 2023 Santarem World Cup, Ahsinger and Webster won a silver medal in the synchro event, and they won another silver medal at the Coimbra World Cup. They then won the gold medal at the Palm Beach World Cup. They won the silver medal at the Varna World Cup to win the overall World Cup series in synchro. She then competed with Jessica Stevens at the 2023 Pan American Games, and they won the synchro title.

Ahsinger and Webster won the synchro competition at the 2024 Baku World Cup. She was named the alternate for the United States at the 2024 Summer Olympics.

== Personal life ==
Ahsinger lives in Lafayette, Louisiana, where she trains at Trampoline and Tumbling Express. She is originally from San Diego, California, and attended Scripps Ranch High School. She attended the University of Louisiana at Lafayette and received a degree in journalism.
