= 1996 Trampoline World Championships =

The 19th Trampoline World Championships were held in Vancouver, British Columbia, Canada from 23 August to 25 August 1996.

== Results ==
=== Men ===
==== Trampoline Individual ====
Rank	Country	Gymnast	Points
Gold medal	Belarus	Dmitri Poliarouch	110.1
Silver medal	France	Emmanuel Durand	109.8
Bronze medal	Belarus	Eugeni Beliaev	108.4
4	France	Guillaume Bourgeon	105.8
5	Russia	German Knytchev	105.0
6=	Canada	Jean-Paul Aucoin	103.8
6=	Canada	Michel Greene	103.8
8	Ukraine	Olexander Chernonos	102.0

==== Trampoline Team ====
Rank	Country	Gymnasts	Points
Gold medal	France	Fabrice Hennique; Guillaume Bourgeon; David Martin; Emmanuel Durand	119.50
Silver medal	Belarus	Dmitri Poliarouch; Nikolai Kazak; Eugueni Beliaev; Rouslan Kashperko	118.40
Bronze medal	Russia	Alexander Russakov; German Knytchev; Alexander Danilchenko; Sergei Iachev	117.7
4	Germany	Michael Serth; Markus Kubicka; Martin Kubicka; Stefan Reithofer	113.20
5	Canada	Michel Greene; Chris Mitruk; Paul Cameron; Jean-Paul Aucoin	109.90

==== Trampoline Synchro ====
Rank	Country	Gymnasts	Points
Gold medal	Russia	Sergei Voronine; Andrei Kossov	135.00
Silver medal	France	David Martin; Emmanuel Durand	133.80
Bronze medal	Germany	Martin Kubicka; Stefan Reithofer	133.30
4	Canada	Jean-Paul Aucoin; Paul Cameron	130.60
5	Denmark	Jesper Dalsten; Mads Ledstrup	128.50
6	Portugal	Joao Marques; Nuno Lico	123.60
7	Australia	Adrian Wareham; Michael Johnston	122.70
8	Switzerland	Markus Wiesner; Didier Raffaeli	121.70

==== Double Mini Trampoline ====
Rank	Country	Gymnast	Points
=	Canada	Chris Mitruk	23.80
=	Australia	Ji Wallace	23.80
Bronze medal	Bulgaria	Radostin Ratchev	23.44
4	New Zealand	Tom Delany	23.33
5	Canada	Jeremy Brock	22.81
6	Australia	Steve Bland	22.61
7	Spain	Alberto Robleda	21.47
8	Germany	Uwe Marquardt	17.50

==== Double Mini Trampoline Team ====
Rank	Country	Gymnasts	Points
Gold medal	Canada	Chris Mitruk; Jeremy Brock; Ben Snape; Israel Martens	35.99
Silver medal	Australia	Ji Wallace; Adrian Wareham; Steve Bland	34.21
Bronze medal	Portugal	Diogo Faria; Pedro Reis; Hugo Paulo; Nuno Lico	34.20
4	Germany	Uwe Marquardt; Steffen Eislöffel; Jörg Gehrke; Thomas Springub	34.00
5	United States	Karl Heger; Brad Davis; Brian Beech; Byron Smith	32.53

==== Tumbling ====
Rank	Country	Gymnast	Points
Gold medal	United States	Rayshine Harris	86.40
Silver medal	Russia	Andrei Krougliakov	82.03
Bronze medal	Russia	Andrei Solovjev	80.43
4	South Africa	Tseko Mogotsi	79.43
5	France	Nicolas Francillon	78.43
6	France	Christophe Freroux	77.71
7	Poland	Adrian Sienkiewicz	77.30
8	Poland	Krzysztof Wilusz	76.09

==== Tumbling Team ====
Rank	Country	Gymnasts	Points
Gold medal	United States	Rayshine Harris; Roger Walker; Brad Davis; Rashaan Sampson	82.90
Silver medal	France	Nicolas Fournials; Stephane Bayol; Franck Salcines; Christophe Freroux	79.20
Bronze medal	Russia	Andrei Krougliakov; Andrei Solovjev; Eugeni Bogomolov	75.57
4	Poland	Krzysztof Wilusz; Adrian Sienkiewicz; Walczak Radoslaw; Tomasz Kies	75.54
5	Canada	Carey Jones; Chris Shaw; Dallas Stevens; Keith McDonald	73.07

=== Women ===
==== Trampoline Individual ====
Rank	Country	Gymnast	Points
Gold medal	Russia	Tatiana Kovaleva	105.8
Silver medal	Russia	Irina Karavaeva	103.7
Bronze medal	Belarus	Galina Lebedeva	102.9
4	Uzbekistan	Elena Saveleva	102.0
5	Ukraine	Olena Movchan	101.1
6	Belarus	Natalia Karpenkova	100.9
7	United States	Jennifer Parilla	100.1
8	Great Britain	Sue Challis	100.0

==== Trampoline Team ====
Rank	Country	Gymnasts	Points
Gold medal	Russia	Irina Karavaeva; Irina Slonova; Alexandra Zakrevskaia; Tatiana Kovaleva	110.00
Silver medal	Ukraine	Oxana Tsyhuleva; Larisa Khreschik; Olena Movchan; Oxana Verbitskaya	108.2
Bronze medal	Belarus	Galina Lebedeva; Liudmila Padasenko; Natalia Karpenkova; Tamara Graevskaia	105.9
4	United States	Jennifer Parilla; Jaime Strandmark; Jennifer Sans; Kimberly Sans	105.40
5	Great Britain	Claire Wright; Kirsten Lawton; Sue Challis; Ellie Dixon-Jackson	101.60

==== Trampoline Synchro ====
Rank	Country	Gymnasts	Points
Gold medal	Ukraine	Oksana Tsyhuleva; Olena Movchan	131.00
Silver medal	Belarus	Natalia Karpenkova; Galina Lebedeva	128.40
Bronze medal	Russia	Alexandra Zakrevskaia; Tatiana Kovaleva	127.30
4	Germany	Tina Ludwig; Hiltrud Roewe	126.80
5	Czech Republic	Lenka Honzakova; Petra Vachnikova	125.20
6	United States	Jennifer Parilla; Jennifer Sans	124.40
7	Japan	Hiroi Tokuma; Akiko Furu	124.20
8	Great Britain	Claire Wright; Sue Challis	124.00

==== Double Mini Trampoline ====
Rank	Country	Gymnast	Points
Gold medal	United States	Jennifer Sans	21.73
Silver medal	Canada	Lisa Colussi	21.48
Bronze medal	Portugal	Maria Oliveira	20.69
4	Portugal	Marta Ferreira	20.60
5	United States	Kimberly Sans	20.48
6	Russia	Marina Mourinova	20.14
7	Germany	Gretje Reinemer	20.07
8	New Zealand	Kylie Walker	18.36

==== Double Mini Trampoline Team ====
Rank	Country	Gymnasts	Points
Gold medal	United States	Jennifer Sans; Kimberly Sans; Erin Maguire; Jaime Strandmark	32.01
Silver medal	New Zealand	Kylie Walker; Rebecca Winstone; Katrina Moodie; Tiffany Smith	30.94
Bronze medal	Germany	Gretje Reinemer; Gitta Rosemann; Nicole Krüger; Ute Springub	29.86
4	Canada	Lisa Colussi; Martha Purdy; Erin Arnason; Joanne Gaumont	29.54
5	Portugal	Maria Oliveira; Marta Ferreira; Tania Galao; Marina Caetano	25.43

==== Tumbling ====
Rank	Country	Gymnast	Points
Gold medal	France	Chrystel Robert	74.44
Silver medal	United States	Kendra Stucki	72.13
Bronze medal	United States	Erin Maguire	70.81
4	Canada	Karen Stevens	69.93
5	France	Karine Boucher	69.70
6	Canada	Kelly Ottenbreit	66.77
7	Portugal	Tania Santos	66.27
8=	Belgium	Yolanda Wouters	65.80
8=	Poland	Wiktoria Weselak	65.80

==== Tumbling Team ====
Rank	Country	Gymnasts	Points
Gold medal	France	Chrystel Robert; Marlene Bayet; Melanie Avisse; Karine Boucher	72.96
Silver medal	United States	Amanda Lentz; Kendra Stucki; Catrina Osteen; Erin Maguire	70.57
Bronze medal	Canada	Karen Stevens; Kelly Ottenbreit; Kovia Lovell; Cassie Shirley	69.43
4	Belgium	Yolanda Wouters; Sigy Van Renterghem; Nathalie Deneef; An De Win	67.06
5	Argentina	Natalia Llermanos; Mariela Acuna; Gladys Dillon; Carolina Munoz	63.40

== Medal table ==
Rank	Nation	Gold	Silver	Bronze	Total
1	United States	4	2	1	7
2	France	3	3	0	6
3	Russia	3	2	4	9
4	Canada	2	1	1	4
5	Belarus	1	2	3	6
6	Australia	1	1	0	2
6	Ukraine	1	1	0	2
8	New Zealand	0	1	0	1
9	Germany	0	0	2	2
9	Portugal	0	0	2	2
11	Bulgaria	0	0	1	1
Totals (11 entries)		15	13	14	42
