= 2005 Trampoline World Championships =

The 24th Trampoline World Championships were held in Eindhoven, Netherlands from 14 September to 17 September 2005.

== Results ==
=== Men ===
==== Trampoline Individual ====
Rank	Country	Gymnast	Points
Gold medal	Russia	Alexander Rusakov	41.300
Silver medal	Japan	Yasuhiro Ueyama	40.900
Bronze medal	Japan	Tetsuya Sotomura	40.800
4	China	Que Zhi Cheng	39.900
5	Germany	Henrik Stehlik	39.400
6	Russia	German Knytchev	34.600
7	Italy	Flavio Cannone	23.500
8	Denmark	Peter Jensen	10.300

==== Trampoline Team ====
Rank	Country	Gymnasts	Points
Gold medal	China	Qipeng Liu; Yong−Feng Mu; Zhi Cheng Que; Shuai Ye	122.10
Silver medal	Japan	Shunsuke Nagasaki; Daisuke Nagata; Tetsuya Sotomura; Yasuhiro ueyama	120.60
Bronze medal	Russia	Alexander Russakov; German Knytchev; Alexander Leven; Dimitri Ushakov	117.50
4	Great Britain	Gary Short; Gary Smith; Simon Milnes; Mark Alexander	112.90
5	Portugal	Diogo Faria; Nuno Merino; Amadeu Neves; Diogo Ganchinho	104.10

==== Trampoline Synchro ====
Rank	Country	Gymnasts	Points
Gold medal	Belarus	Vladimir Kakorko; Nikolai Kazak	50.000
Silver medal	Switzerland	Michel Boillet; Ludovic Martin	49.500
Bronze medal	Japan	Tetsuya Sotomura; Yasuhiro Ueyama	49.300
4	Germany	Michael Serth; Henrik Stehlik	48.800
5	Denmark	Jaacob Hansen; Peter Jensen	48.700
6	Netherlands	Sven Mooij; Alan Villafuerte	47.800
7	France	Mickaël Jala; Sébastien Laifa	26.500
8	Ukraine	Viacheslav Makovetki; Denis Vrazhkin	13.800

==== Double Mini Trampoline ====
Rank	Country	Gymnast	Points
Gold medal	Bulgaria	Radostin Rachev	75.100
Silver medal	United States	Keith Douglas	73.400
Bronze medal	Germany	Nico Gaertner	73.100
4	Moldova	Vladimir Cojoc	72.600
5	Canada	Bryan Milonja	71.300
6	Great Britain	Micheal Scott-Beaulieu	55.500
7	Russia	Alexey Ilichev	37.500
8	Portugal	Bruno Nobre	32.500

==== Double Mini Trampoline Team ====
Rank	Country	Gymnasts	Points
Gold medal	Canada	Bob Watson; Jamie Lange; Bryan Milonja; Denis Vachon	111.20
Silver medal	Bulgaria	Radostin Rachev; Todor Banov; Dimitar Chaushev; Krasimir Kochev	110.20
Bronze medal	Spain	Hoi Pui Chau Tsang; Aniol Perez; Sandro Moreno; Jose Manuel Munoz	106.80
4	Russia	Alexei Ilichev; Stanislav Pokroev; Alexei Borovikov; Mikhail Povkh	75.50
5	United States	Keith Douglas; Casey Finley; Derek Stangel; Josh Vance	73.60

==== Tumbling ====
Rank	Country	Gymnast	Points
Gold medal	China	Wang Jiexu	77.000
Silver medal	China	Chen Yang	76.300
Bronze medal	Poland	Jozef Wadecki	75.700
4	France	Yves Tarin	71.200
5	Great Britain	Damien Walters	70.300
6	United States	Casey Finley	67.400
7	France	Nicolas Fournials	63.300
8	Kazakhstan	Sergei Berestovski	59.800

==== Tumbling Team ====
Rank	Country	Gymnasts	Points
Gold medal	China	Huanian Pan; Chen Yang; Jiexu Wang	111.90
Silver medal	Russia	Alexandre Skorodunov; Alexander Goncharov; Alexander Podlesky; Tagir Murtazaev	110.20
Bronze medal	France	Nicolas Fournials; Alexandre Dechanet; Nicolas Divry; Julien Coudert	100.00
4	Canada	Chris Donaldson; Anton Minayev; Cletus Okpoh; Denis Vachon	99.40
5	United States	Casey Finley; Chris Ford; Kalon Ludvigson; Gus Roethlisberger	94.80

=== Women ===
==== Trampoline Individual ====
Rank	Country	Gymnast	Points
Gold medal	Russia	Irina Karavaeva	38.900
Silver medal	Russia	Natalia Chernova	38.400
Bronze medal	Germany	Anna Dogonadze	38.300
4	Netherlands	Andrea Lenders	37.900
5	United States	Alaina Hebert	37.600
6	Canada	Karen Cockburn	37.600
7	Ukraine	Olena Movchan	37.400
8	China	Huang Shanshan	37.300

==== Trampoline Team ====
Rank	Country	Gymnasts	Points
Gold medal	China	Huang Shanshan; Dan Luo; Xingping Zhong; Wenjuan Wang	112.30
Silver medal	Russia	Irina Karavaeva; Natalia Chernova; Natalia Kolesnikova; Natalia Kolesnikova	108.40
Bronze medal	United States	Jennifer Parilla; Amanda Bailey; Jenny Wescott; Alaina Hebert	94.30
4	Ukraine	Svitlana Sigitova; Yulia Domchevska; Olena Movchan; Marina kiyko	78.70
5	Germany	Jessica Simon; Anna Dogonadze; Sarah Syed; Jessica Simon	57.30

==== Trampoline Synchro ====
Rank	Country	Gymnasts	Points
Gold medal	Russia	Irina Karavaeva; Natalia Chernova	48.500
Silver medal	Canada	Karen Cockburn; Rosannagh MacLennan	48.300
Bronze medal	Germany	Jessica Simon; Anna Dogonadze	46.300
4	Japan	Yoko Seto; Hiromi Hammoto	45.300
5	Great Britain	Claire Wright; Jaime Moore	45.200
6	Ukraine	Yulia Domchevska; Olena Movchan	42.300
7	Belarus	Alena Tarasevich; Tatiana Petrenia	22.800
8	United States	Jennifer Parilla; Alaina Hebert	

==== Double Mini Trampoline ====
Rank	Country	Gymnast	Points
Gold medal	Portugal	Silvia Saiote	69.400
Silver medal	Russia	Anna Ivanova	65.000
Bronze medal	Portugal	Ana Simoes	64.700
4	Canada	Jane Bickerstaff	53.800
5	Canada	Julie Warnock	35.500
6	Bulgaria	Antonia Ivanova	34.600
7	Russia	Galina Goncharenko	33.200
8	Slovakia	Katarina Prokesova	30.800

==== Double Mini Trampoline Team ====
Rank	Country	Gymnasts	Points
Gold medal	Portugal	Silvia Saiote; Marta Ferreira; Ana Simoes; Nicole Pacheco	103.70
Silver medal	United States	Krista Mahoney; Shelly Klochan; Megan Dacy; Ashlynn Sundvold	103.00
Bronze medal	Canada	Julie Warnock; Sarah Charles; Jane Bickerstaff; Rose James	92.50
4	Russia	Anna Ivanova; Maria Kozlova; Svetlana Balandina; Galina Gontcharenko	70.00
5	Great Britain	Asha Bayliss; Nicola Pugh; Nicola Petitt	83.90

==== Tumbling ====
Rank	Country	Gymnast	Points
Gold medal	Russia	Anna Korobeynikova	70.800
Silver medal	Ukraine	Olena Chabanenko	70.100
Bronze medal	Great Britain	Samantha Palmer	68.300
4	United States	Alexis Diaz	64.800
5	Russia	Elena Bluzhina	64.200
6	United States	Yulia Hall	62.300
7	Great Britain	Zoe McLean	60.600
8	France	Emeline Millory	59.400

==== Tumbling Team ====
Rank	Country	Gymnasts	Points
Gold medal	Russia	Elena Bloujina; Natalia Rakhmanova; Anna Korobeinkova; Tatiana Danilina	96.60
Silver medal	United States	Yulia Hall; Alexis Diaz; Amy McDonald; Leanne Seitzinger	91.70
Bronze medal	France	Delphine Francois; Emeline Millory; Marion Limbach; Elisa Faure	90.70
4	Great Britain	Sarah Bellis; Zoe Maclean; Donna Maclean; Samatha Palmer	89.30
5	Ukraine	Olena Chabanenko; Kateryna Bayeva; Hanna Zayarna; Hanna Mamchur	86.30
