= Trampoline gymnastics at the 2001 World Games – Women's synchronized trampoline =

Women's synchronized trampoline at the World Games
- Venue: Akita City Gymnasium
- Date: 20–21 August 2001
- Competitors: 18 from 9 nations

Medalists
1st place, gold medalist(s)		Oxana Tsyhuleva; Olena Movchan
2nd place, silver medalist(s)		Kirsten Lawton; Claire Wright
3rd place, bronze medalist(s)		Irina Karavayeva; Natalia Chernova

The women's synchronized trampoline competition in trampoline gymnastics at the 2001 World Games took place from 20 to 21 August 2001 at the Akita City Gymnasium in Akita, Japan.

== Competition format ==
A total of 9 pairs entered the competition. Best eight duets from preliminary round qualifies to the final.

== Results ==
=== Preliminary ===
Rank	Athlete	Nation	Round 1	Round 2	Total	Note
1	Anna Dogonadze; Tina Ludwig	Germany	37.50	47.40	84.90	Q
2	Irina Karavayeva; Natalia Chernova	Russia	36.20	47.90	84.10	Q
3	Hiroi Tokuma; Akiko Furu	Japan	37.10	46.10	83.20	Q
4	Kirsten Lawton; Claire Wright	(United Kingdom) Great Britain	37.50	45.70	83.20	Q
5	Andrea Martonova; Katka Prokešová	Slovakia	36.70	45.40	82.10	Q
6	Lisa Ross; Khali Ridge	Australia	34.60	44.10	78.70	Q
7	Kim Poling; Jaime Strandmark	United States	35.50	41.50	77.00	Q
8	Oxana Tsyhuleva; Olena Movchan	Ukraine	37.60	14.50	52.10	Q
9	Tatsiana Piatrenia; Galina Lebedeva	Belarus	37.20	13.70	51.90	

=== Final ===
Rank	Athlete	Nation	Score
1st place, gold medalist(s)	Oxana Tsyhuleva; Olena Movchan	Ukraine	50.90
2nd place, silver medalist(s)	Kirsten Lawton; Claire Wright	(United Kingdom) Great Britain	48.40
3rd place, bronze medalist(s)	Irina Karavayeva; Natalia Chernova	Russia	47.00
4	Hiroi Tokuma; Akiko Furu	Japan	45.70
5	Lisa Ross; Khali Ridge	Australia	44.60
6	Andrea Martonova; Katka Prokešová	Slovakia	43.90
7	Kim Poling; Jaime Strandmark	United States	43.70
8	Anna Dogonadze; Tina Ludwig	Germany	30.20
