= 2007 Trampoline World Championships =

The 25th Trampoline World Championships were held in Quebec City, Canada from 31 October to 3 November 2007.

== Results ==
=== Men ===
==== Trampoline Individual ====
| Rank | Country | Gymnast | Points |
|---|---|---|---|
| Gold medal | China | Ye Shuai | 41.400 |
| Silver medal | China | Dong Dong | 40.700 |
| Bronze medal | Japan | Yasuhiro Ueyama | 40.500 |
| 4 | Japan | Tetsuya Sotomura | 39.700 |
| 5 | Germany | Henrik Stehlik | 39.500 |
| 6 | Italy | Flavio Cannone | 39.500 |
| 7 | Russia | Alexander Rusakov | 39.500 |
| 8 | Russia | Dmitry Ushakov | 39.300 |

==== Trampoline Team ====
| Rank | Country | Gymnasts | Points |
|---|---|---|---|
| Gold medal | China | Dong Dong; Chunlong Lu; Tu Xiao; Ye Shuai | 122.90 |
| Silver medal | Japan | Shunsuke Nagasaki; Masaki Ito; Tetsuya Sotomura; Yasuhiro Ueyama | 119.50 |
| Bronze medal | France | Mickaël Jala; Sébastien Martiny; David Martin; Grégoire Pennes | 117.00 |
| 4 | Russia | Alexander Russakov; German Knytchev; Yuri Kozyakov; Dmitry Ushakov | 99.80 |
| 5 | Ukraine | Viacheslav Makovetski; Andrei Matvyev; Oleksander Chernonos; Yuri Nikitin | 76.50 |

==== Trampoline Synchro ====
| Rank | Country | Gymnasts | Points |
|---|---|---|---|
| Gold medal | Japan | Tetsuya Sotomura; Yasuhiro Ueyama | 51.200 |
| Silver medal | Australia | Scott Brown; Ben Wilden | 49.600 |
| Bronze medal | Switzerland | Michel Boillet; Ludovic Martin | 48.200 |
| 4 | United States | Ryan Weston; Chris Estrada | 48.100 |
| 5 | France | Mickaël Jala; Sébastien Laifa | 48.100 |
| 6 | Belarus | Yakau Rakitski; Yauhen Zhukouski | 47.900 |
| 7 | Ukraine | Yuri Nikitin; Olexander Chernonos | 5.400 |
| 8 | Russia | Alexander Rusakov; Dmitry Ushakov | |

==== Double Mini Trampoline ====
| Rank | Country | Gymnast | Points |
|---|---|---|---|
| Gold medal | Russia | Kirill Ivanov | 78.000 |
| Silver medal | Canada | Denis Vachon | 73.600 |
| Bronze medal | United States | Kalon Ludvigson | 71.600 |
| 4 | Russia | Alexey Borovikov | 70.900 |
| 5 | Australia | Ty Swadling | 70.900 |
| 6 | United States | Stephen Raymond | 69.300 |
| 7 | Portugal | Fabio Castanho | 61.400 |
| 8 | Great Britain | Micheal Scott-Beaulieu | 37.700 |

==== Double Mini Trampoline Team ====
| Rank | Country | Gymnasts | Points |
|---|---|---|---|
| Gold medal | Russia | Alexei Ilichev; Kirill Ivanov; Alexei Borovikov; Evgeniy Chernoivanov | 111.40 |
| Silver medal | United States | Stephen Raymond; Kalon Ludvigson; Andrew Muzzarelli; Josh Vance | 109.60 |
| Bronze medal | Great Britain | Micheal Scott-Beaulieu; Toby Eager; Domonic Swaffer; Matthew Swaffer | 107.20 |
| 4 | Australia | Ty Swadling; Damian Ryan; Nicholas Smith; Leigh Howlett | 95.60 |
| 5 | Spain | Ivan Ontiveros Ortiz; Aniol Perez; Sandro Moreno; Ruiz−Cuevas Quintero A. | 56.80 |

==== Tumbling ====
| Rank | Country | Gymnast | Points |
|---|---|---|---|
| Gold medal | Russia | Andrey Krylov | 79.200 |
| Silver medal | China | Pan Huanian | 77.200 |
| Bronze medal | Belarus | Sergei Artemenko | 74.900 |
| 4 | United States | Kalon Ludvigson | 74.900 |
| 5 | China | Wang Jiexu | 72.600 |
| 6 | Belarus | Andrei Kabishev | 71.800 |
| 7 | Great Britain | Charlie Burrows | 71.700 |
| 8 | Ukraine | Yuriy Freyuk | 62.700 |

==== Tumbling Team ====
| Rank | Country | Gymnasts | Points |
|---|---|---|---|
| Gold medal | Russia | Andrey Krylov; Alexander Goncharov; Alexander Dramaretskiy; Vasili Kirillov | 113.90 |
| Silver medal | China | Huanian Pan; Yang Song; Jiexu Wang; Zhenqiu Li | 111.90 |
| Bronze medal | Belarus | Andrei Kabishev; Sergei Artemenko; Sergei Primakou; Dzmitry Darashuk | 109.00 |
| 4 | Great Britain | Michael Barnes; Charlie Burrows; Damien Walters greg Boosey | 107.70 |
| 5 | United States | Jeffrey Brown; Chris Ford; Kalon Ludvigson; Chris Adair | 106.40 |

=== Women ===
==== Trampoline Individual ====
| Rank | Country | Gymnast | Points |
|---|---|---|---|
| Gold medal | Russia | Irina Karavaeva | 38.600 |
| Silver medal | China | Huang Shanshan | 38.100 |
| Bronze medal | Canada | Rosannagh MacLennan | 37.700 |
| 4 | China | He Wenna | 37.100 |
| 5 | Germany | Anna Dogonadze | 36.800 |
| 6 | Belarus | Tatiana Petrenia | 35.200 |
| 7 | Russia | Natalia Chernova | 34.400 |
| 8 | Canada | Karen Cockburn | 17.600 |

==== Trampoline Team ====
| Rank | Country | Gymnasts | Points |
|---|---|---|---|
| Gold medal | China | Huang Shanshan; Dan Luo; Xingping Zhong; Wenna He | 115.20 |
| Silver medal | Canada | Karen Cockburn; Brenna Casey; Rosannagh MacLennan; Sarah Charles | 111.40 |
| Bronze medal | Russia | Irina Karavaeva; Natalia Chernova; Natalia Kolesnikova; Galina Goncharenko | 107.90 |
| 4 | Japan | Mina Terada; Kazuya Minato; Haruka Hirato; Hirromi Hammoto | 106.00 |
| 5 | Belarus | Maria Gridchina; Ekaterina Mironova; Tatiana Prischepova; Tatiana Petrenia | 104.70 |

==== Trampoline Synchro ====
| Rank | Country | Gymnasts | Points |
|---|---|---|---|
| Gold medal | Canada | Karen Cockburn; Rosannagh Maclennan | 49.300 |
| Silver medal | Russia | Irina Karavaeva; Natalia Chernova | 48.700 |
| Bronze medal | Ukraine | Yulia Domchevska; Olena Movchan | 47.700 |
| 4 | Belarus | Tatiana Petrenia; Ekaterina Mironova | 46.500 |
| 5 | China | Gu Qingwen; Jiang Yiqi | 46.400 |
| 6 | Japan | Kazuyo Minato; Mina Terada | 43.800 |
| 7 | Germany | Lara Hueninghake; Sarah Syed | 41.800 |
| 8 | Great Britain | Claire Wright; Katherine Driscoll | 23.400 |

==== Double Mini Trampoline ====
| Rank | Country | Gymnast | Points |
|---|---|---|---|
| Gold medal | Canada | Sarah Charles | 70.900 |
| Silver medal | Canada | Julie Warnock | 69.700 |
| Bronze medal | United States | Kaci Barry | 68.800 |
| 4 | Russia | Galina Goncharenko | 67.800 |
| 5 | Russia | Victoria Voronina | 65.900 |
| 6 | Portugal | Ana Simoes | 65.800 |
| 7 | United States | Aubree Balkan | 54.600 |
| 8 | Brazil | Samantha Oliveira | 54.500 |

==== Double Mini Trampoline Team ====
| Rank | Country | Gymnasts | Points |
|---|---|---|---|
| Gold medal | Russia | Anastasia Velichko; Victoria Voronina; Svetlana Balandina; Galina Gontcharenko | 104.70 |
| Silver medal | Canada | Julie Warnock; Sarah Charles; Kelsi Semeschuk; Merdith Reynolds | 103.70 |
| Bronze medal | United States | Aubree Balkan; Kaci Barry; Sarah Prosen | 101.00 |
| 4 | Portugal | Silvia Saiote; Marta Ferreira; Ana Simoes; Joana Pereira | 100.80 |
| 5 | Great Britain | Asha Bayliss; Nicola Pugh; Kristy Ward; Asha Philip | 100.60 |

==== Tumbling ====
| Rank | Country | Gymnast | Points |
|---|---|---|---|
| Gold medal | Russia | Anna Korobeynikova | 70.700 |
| Silver medal | Ukraine | Olena Chabanenko | 68.200 |
| Bronze medal | Russia | Anastasia Isupova | 67.700 |
| 4 | Belarus | Anna Terrenia | 66.100 |
| 5 | China | Song Yehong | 61.300 |
| 6 | Great Britain | Sarah Turner | 55.100 |
| 7 | United States | Yulia Hall | 52.700 |
| 8 | United States | Kaitlin Tortorich | 50.700 |

==== Tumbling Team ====
| Rank | Country | Gymnasts | Points |
|---|---|---|---|
| Gold medal | United States | Yulia Hall; Kaitlin Tortorich; Susannah Johnson; Leanne Seitzinger | 98.50 |
| Silver medal | Russia | Anastasia Isupova; Ekaterina Reynbakh; Anna Korobeinkova; Anzhelika Soldatkina | 97.70 |
| Bronze medal | Great Britain | Sarah Turner; Zoe Maclean; Laura Houson; Samatha Palmer | 96.60 |
| 4 | Canada | Emily Smith; Ashley Speed; Jenna Stamp; Julie Warnock | 96.60 |
| 5 | Ukraine | Olena Chabanenko; Kateryna Bayeva; Olga Sudarkova; Olena Dribna | 94.80 |

== Medal table ==
| Rank | Nation | Gold | Silver | Bronze | Total |
|---|---|---|---|---|---|
| 1 | Russia (RUS) | 7 | 2 | 2 | 11 |
| 2 | China (CHN) | 3 | 4 | 0 | 7 |
| 3 | Canada (CAN) | 2 | 4 | 1 | 7 |
| 4 | United States (USA) | 1 | 1 | 3 | 5 |
| 5 | Japan (JPN) | 1 | 1 | 1 | 3 |
| 6 | Ukraine (UKR) | 0 | 1 | 1 | 2 |
| 7 | Australia (AUS) | 0 | 1 | 0 | 1 |
| 8 | Belarus (BLR) | 0 | 0 | 2 | 2 |
| 8 | Great Britain (GBR) | 0 | 0 | 2 | 2 |
| 10 | France (FRA) | 0 | 0 | 1 | 1 |
| 10 | Switzerland (SUI) | 0 | 0 | 1 | 1 |
| Totals (11 entries) | | 14 | 14 | 14 | 42 |
