= 2000 European Trampoline Championships =

The 17th European Trampoline Championships took place in Eindhoven, Netherlands, in October, 2000.

== Medals ==
=== Juniors ===
https://www.gymmedia.com/TR/events2000/em/medals.htm

15th European Junior Championships

1 Germany 6 1 - 7

2 Russia 4 3 4 11

3 Portugal 2 - 1 3

4 France 1 3 4 8

5 Belgium 1 - - 1

6 Belarus - 3 1 4

7 Netherlands - 2 - 2

8 Spain - 1 1 2

9 Switzerland - 1 - 1

10 Great Britain - - 1 1

11 Ukraine - - 1 1

=== Seniors ===
Rank	Nation	Gold	Silver	Bronze	Total
1	Russia (RUS)	7	1	1	9
2	France (FRA)	2	1	2	5
3	Portugal (POR)	2	1	0	3
4	Belarus (BLR)	1	2	2	5
5	Belgium (BEL)	1	0	0	1
5	Slovakia (SVK)	1	0	0	1
7	Germany (GER)	0	5	1	6
8	Ukraine (UKR)	0	2	2	4
9	Great Britain (GBR)	0	1	3	4
10	Bulgaria (BUL)	0	1	2	3
11	Moldova (MDA)	0	0	1	1
Totals (11 entries)		14	14	14	42

== Results ==
Event	Gold	Silver	Bronze
Men
Individual	German Khnytchev (RUS)	David Martin (FRA)	Vladimir Kakorko (BLR)
Synchro	Russia; German Khnytchev; Aleksandr Moskalenko	Germany; Michael Serth; Stefan Reithofer	Great Britain; Simon Milnes; Mark Alexander
Trampoline Team	France	Belarus	United Kingdom
Double Mini	Nuno Merino (POR)	Uwe Marquardt (GER)	Vladimir Cojoc (MDA)
Double Mini Team	Portugal	Germany	Russia
Tumbling	Levon Petrosian (RUS)	Ruslan Gruzda (UKR)	Andriy Kozlenko (UKR)
Tumbling Team	Russia	United Kingdom	France
Women
Individual	Irina Karavaeva (RUS)	Anna Dogonadze (GER)	Oksana Tsyguleva (UKR)
Synchro	Belarus; Galina Lebedeva; Natalia Karpenkova	Germany; Tina Ludwig; Anna Dogonadze	Great Britain; Claire Wright; Kirsten Lawton
Trampoline Team	Russia	Belarus	Germany
Double Mini	Katarina Prokesova (SVK)	Teodora Sinilkova (BUL)	Antonia Ivanova (BUL)
Double Mini Team	Belgium	Portugal	Bulgaria
Tumbling	Elena Bloujina (RUS)	Natalia Rakhmanova (RUS)	Chrystel Robert (FRA)
Tumbling Team	France	Ukraine	Belarus
