= Gymnastics at the 2000 Summer Olympics – Women's trampoline =

Women's trampoline at the Games of the XXVII Olympiad
- Date: 22 September 2000
- Competitors: 12 from 12 nations

Medalists
1st place, gold medalist(s)		Irina Karavaeva	Russia
2nd place, silver medalist(s)		Oxana Tsyhuleva	Ukraine
3rd place, bronze medalist(s)		Karen Cockburn	Canada

These are the results for the women's individual trampoline competition, one of two events of the trampoline discipline contested in the gymnastics at the 2000 Summer Olympics in Sydney.

== Results ==
=== Qualification ===
Twelve entrants competed in the qualifying round. The top eight progressed to the final round.

Rank	Athlete	Compulsory	Optional	Total	Notes
1	Anna Dogonadze (GER)	28.20	37.00	65.20	Q
2	Irina Karavaeva (RUS)	28.50	36.70	65.20	Q
3	Oxana Tsyhuleva (UKR)	27.60	37.50	65.10	Q
4	Karen Cockburn (CAN)	27.80	37.20	65.00	Q
5	Natalia Karpenkova (BLR)	28.00	35.80	63.80	Q
6	Rusudan Khoperia (GEO)	27.40	34.90	62.30	Q
7	Akiko Furu (JPN)	26.70	35.40	62.10	Q
8	Ekaterina Khilko (UZB)	27.60	34.10	61.70	Q
9	Jennifer Parilla (USA)	26.90	33.80	60.70	R1
10	Robyn Forbes (AUS)	27.50	33.20	60.70	R2
11	Petra Vachníková (CZE)	26.40	34.00	60.40	
12	Jaime Moore (GBR)	27.10	32.80	59.90	

=== Final ===
Rank	Athlete	Poland	Brazil	Denmark	Australia	Portugal	Diff	Total
Gold medal	Irina Karavaeva (RUS)	9.0	9.0	8.8	8.8	8.8	12.30	38.90
Silver medal	Oxana Tsyhuleva (UKR)	8.6	8.6	8.5	8.6	8.6	11.90	37.70
Bronze medal	Karen Cockburn (CAN)	8.5	8.3	8.5	8.3	8.2	12.30	37.40
4	Ekaterina Khilko (UZB)	8.4	8.4	8.2	8.3	8.2	11.70	36.60
5	Natalia Karpenkova (BLR)	8.3	8.5	8.3	8.2	8.1	11.00	35.80
6	Akiko Furu (JPN)	8.2	8.5	8.3	8.0	8.0	10.80	35.30
7	Rusudan Khoperia (GEO)	7.5	7.4	7.1	7.2	7.4	12.10	34.10
8	Anna Dogonadze (GER)	0.9	1.0	0.8	0.8	0.8	2.50	5.00
