= Chen Yang =

Chen Yang or Yang Chen may refer to:

== People surnamed Chen ==
- Chen Yang (TV host) (born 1954), Chinese TV host and newspaper columnist
- Chen Yang (footballer) (born 1977), Chinese football player and manager
- Chen Yang (gymnast) (born 1987), Chinese trampolinist
- Chen Yang (discus thrower) (born 1991), Chinese discus thrower
- Chen Yang (field hockey) (born 1997), Chinese field hockey player

== People surnamed Yang ==
- Yang Chen (footballer, born 1974), Chinese football player and manager
- Yang Chen (parathlete) (born 1989), Chinese Paralympic athlete
- Yang Chen (footballer, born 1989), Chinese football player
- Yang Chen (footballer, born 1991), Chinese football player
- Yang Chen-Ning (1922–2025), Chinese theoretical physicist
