= Farnham Grammar School =

School in Farnham, Surrey, England

Coordinates: 51.208°N 0.793°W

Farnham Grammar School on its last site

Farnham Grammar School is now called Farnham College which is located in Farnham, Surrey, southern England.

== History ==
The grammar school was created at some time before 1585 (the date of a donation being made by a Richard Searle "to the maintenance of the school in Farnham"). The first evidence that the school was built is a record in 1585 of a yeoman in Farnham donating 20 shillings 'to the maintenance of the school of Farnham'. It is, though, possible that this ancient school dated back as far as 1351 when a chantry was created at Farnham Castle, but there is no documentary evidence of this.

The school benefited over the years from bequests by different people as well as the generosity of Bishops of Winchester who occupied Farnham Castle over the centuries.

== New building ==
The school was housed in West Street, Farnham until 1906. It moved then because in the previous year, the town centre assets were sold in order to purchase and build a new school in fields to the south of the town.

== Dissolution ==
In 1973, under Government education reforms, the school merged with Farnham Girls' Grammar School (now South Farnham School) to form Farnham College.

== Notable alumni ==
- Patrick Blower (born 1959), Chief Political Cartoonist at The Daily Telegraph
- Jack Coutu (1924–2017), printmaker and sculptor
- Maj-Gen Alexander Elmslie CB CBE, Colonel Commandant of the Royal Army Service Corps (RASC) from 1964-5, and the Royal Corps of Transport from 1964–69
- Cyril Garbett (briefly), successively the Anglican Bishop of Southwark and Bishop of Winchester, later Archbishop of York from 1942–55
- Jack Gwillim, actor
- Jeremy Hardy, comedian
- Hugh Johns, ITV football commentator
- Charles Judd CBE, Director General of the United Nations Association UK from 1945–64
- James Kendall, Professor Chemistry at the University of Edinburgh from 1928–59, and President of the Royal Society of Edinburgh from 1949–54
- David Lea, Baron Lea of Crondall OBE, trade union official
- Lt-Gen Sir Harold Redman CB CBE, Governor of Gibraltar from 1955-8
- Prof Charles Rees CBE, Hofmann Professor of Organic Chemistry at Imperial College London from 1978–83, and President of the Royal Society of Chemistry from 1992–94
- Sir Eric Rideal MBE (briefly), chemist, Professor of Colloid Science at the University of Cambridge from 1930–46
- George Sturt, author
- Jeffrey Tate CBE (attended 1954–61), conductor
- Bill Wallis (attended 1948–55), actor and satirist (head boy in his final year)
- David Watkin, Professor of History of Architecture from 2001-8 at the University of Cambridge
- Squadron Leader Sydney Wiltshire, awarded the George Cross
