= Ascherson =

Ascherson is a surname. Notable people with the surname include:

- Neal Ascherson (born 1932), Scottish journalist
- Pamela Ascherson (1923–2010), British sculptor, painter, and illustrator
- Paul Friedrich August Ascherson (1834–1913), German botanist

== See also ==
- Renée Asherson (born Dorothy Renée Ascherson, 1915–2014), English actress
