= Gymnastics at the 2004 Summer Olympics – Men's trampoline =

Men's trampoline at the Games of the XXVIII Olympiad

Medalists
1st place, gold medalist(s)		Yuri Nikitin	Ukraine
2nd place, silver medalist(s)		Alexander Moskalenko	Russia
3rd place, bronze medalist(s)		Henrik Stehlik	Germany

These are the results for the men's individual trampoline competition, one of two events of the trampoline discipline contested in the gymnastics at the 2004 Summer Olympics. The qualification and final rounds took place on August 21 in the Olympic Indoor Hall in Athens.

== Results ==
=== Qualification ===
Sixteen gymnasts competed in the qualification round by performing a compulsory routine followed by a free routine. For the compulsory routine (#1), each gymnast received a score from 0.0 to 10.0 from each of the five execution judges, with the highest and lowest scores being dropped. The free routine (#2) had a similar format but included a difficulty score, determined by two difficulty judges, which was added to the three kept scores from the execution judges. The scores from the two routines were summed to give the total score and the eight highest scoring gymnasts advanced to the final.

Rank	Gymnast	Country	#	Greece	Spain	Brazil	Sweden	Czech Republic	Difficulty score	Routine score	Total	
1	Henrik Stehlik	Germany	1	9.3	9.4	9.4	9.4	9.3	—	28.10	69.10	Q
1	Henrik Stehlik	Germany	2	8.3	8.5	8.5	8.5	8.4	15.6	41.00	69.10	Q
2	Yuri Nikitin	Ukraine	1	9.3	9.2	9.2	9.2	9.0	—	27.60	69.00	Q
2	Yuri Nikitin	Ukraine	2	8.3	8.4	8.6	8.5	8.2	16.2	41.40	69.00	Q
3	Alexander Rusakov	Russia	1	9.3	9.4	9.4	9.4	9.2	—	28.10	69.00	Q
3	Alexander Rusakov	Russia	2	8.2	8.2	8.3	8.2	8.4	16.2	40.90	69.00	Q
4	Alexander Moskalenko	Russia	1	9.3	9.4	9.5	9.5	9.4	—	28.30	68.90	Q
4	Alexander Moskalenko	Russia	2	8.2	8.1	8.3	8.1	8.3	16.0	40.60	68.90	Q
5	Dimitri Polyarush	Belarus	1	9.1	8.9	9.2	9.2	9.2	—	27.50	67.80	Q
5	Dimitri Polyarush	Belarus	2	8.3	8.4	8.3	8.1	8.0	15.6	40.30	67.80	Q
6	David Martin	France	1	8.8	8.8	8.9	9.0	9.1	—	26.70	67.40	Q
6	David Martin	France	2	8.1	8.3	8.3	8.4	8.3	15.8	40.70	67.40	Q
7	Gary Smith	Great Britain	1	9.1	9.1	9.1	8.9	9.0	—	27.20	67.20	Q
7	Gary Smith	Great Britain	2	8.1	8.2	8.1	7.9	8.0	15.8	40.00	67.20	Q
8	Nuno Merino	Portugal	1	9.1	8.7	8.8	9.0	8.9	—	26.70	66.90	Q
8	Nuno Merino	Portugal	2	8.0	8.0	8.0	7.5	8.2	16.2	40.20	66.90	Q
9	Ludovic Martin	Switzerland	1	9.0	9.1	9.0	9.1	9.2	—	27.20	66.80	
9	Ludovic Martin	Switzerland	2	7.9	7.9	7.9	8.0	8.2	15.8	39.60	66.80	
10	Mu Yongfeng	China	1	8.7	8.5	8.8	8.8	8.8	—	26.30	65.20	
10	Mu Yongfeng	China	2	8.0	8.0	7.8	7.7	7.7	15.4	38.90	65.20	
11	Mathieu Turgeon	Canada	1	8.8	8.7	8.8	9.1	9.0	—	26.60	63.40	
11	Mathieu Turgeon	Canada	2	6.8	6.9	6.8	6.9	7.1	16.2	36.80	63.40	
12	Michail Pelivanidis	Greece	1	8.9	8.4	8.4	8.7	8.8	—	25.90	62.60	
12	Michail Pelivanidis	Greece	2	7.3	7.3	7.2	7.4	7.0	14.9	36.70	62.60	
13	Flavio Cannone	Italy	1	9.4	9.1	9.1	9.1	8.9	—	27.30	57.60	
13	Flavio Cannone	Italy	2	6.3	6.4	6.3	6.5	6.2	11.3	30.30	57.60	
14	Mikalai Kazak	Belarus	1	9.4	9.1	9.2	9.4	9.4	—	28.00	52.80	
14	Mikalai Kazak	Belarus	2	4.7	4.5	4.6	4.3	4.4	11.3	24.80	52.80	
15	Alan Villafuerte	Netherlands	1	9.0	8.8	9.0	9.2	9.0	—	27.00	44.90	
15	Alan Villafuerte	Netherlands	2	3.1	3.2	3.2	3.0	3.5	8.4	17.90	44.90	
16	Peter Jensen	Denmark	1	8.7	8.8	8.8	8.9	8.9	—	26.50	32.70	
16	Peter Jensen	Denmark	2	0.9	0.9	0.9	0.9	0.8	3.5	6.20	32.70	

=== Final ===
The eight qualified gymnasts performed a single free routine with the same scoring format as in the qualification round.

Rank	Gymnast	Greece	Spain	Sweden	Czech Republic	Brazil	Difficulty score	Total
Gold medal	Yuri Nikitin (UKR)	8.3	8.6	8.5	8.4	8.4	16.2	41.50
Silver medal	Alexander Moskalenko (RUS)	8.2	8.5	8.4	8.4	8.2	16.2	41.20
Bronze medal	Henrik Stehlik (GER)	8.2	8.5	8.4	8.4	8.4	15.6	40.80
4	Dimitri Polyarush (BLR)	8.0	7.9	8.1	8.1	8.2	16.0	40.20
5	Alexander Rusakov (RUS)	8.0	8.1	7.9	7.8	7.9	16.4	40.20
6	Nuno Merino (POR)	8.1	7.9	7.9	7.7	8.1	16.2	40.10
7	Gary Smith (GBR)	8.1	7.9	8.0	7.8	8.2	16.0	40.00
8	David Martin (FRA)	8.1	8.0	8.0	8.1	7.8	15.8	39.90
