= Farnham College =

Sixth form college in Farnham, England

Coordinates: 51.208°N 0.793°W

Information
- School type: Sixth form college
- Established: September 1973; 53 years ago
- Age: 16 to 19

Farnham College is a coeducational sixth form college in Farnham in the English county of Surrey. It has a single campus in a residential area just to the south of Farnham town centre, and is now a foundation college. The majority of its land is leased from the Farnham College Foundation, which is governed by a board of trustees, four of whom are college governors.

The college offers a wide range of A-level and vocational qualifications and also caters for students with physical disabilities and special learning needs.

== History ==
Farnham College is the successor to Farnham Grammar School for boys, which was created some time before 1585 (the date of a donation being made by a Richard Searle "to the maintenance of the school in Farnham"). It is possible that this ancient school dated back as far as 1351 when a chantry was created at Farnham Castle, but there is no documentary evidence of this.

The school benefited over the years from various bequests as well as the generosity of Bishops of Winchester, who occupied Farnham Castle over the centuries.

In 1905, the town centre assets of the school were sold in order to purchase and build a new school in fields to the south of the town. In 1973, under Government education reforms, the school gave way to the present Farnham College.

Farnham College was created from the amalgamation of Farnham Girls' Grammar School with Farnham Grammar School and opened in September 1973 as Farnham's first sixth form college. At the same time the local secondary schools became 13 to 16 comprehensive schools. The college was established on the site of Farnham Grammar School, initially using the existing buildings. The Girls' Grammar School building in Menin Way is now home to South Farnham School.

In 2007 a merger took place between the college and Guildford College.

In 2019 Farnham College, along with the rest of Guildford College Group, were brought under the management of Activate Learning.

== Campus ==
Morley Court is the original school building of the former grammar school and was first opened in 1906. When built it was surrounded by extensive playing fields and these continue to form part of the site; with pitches for football (soccer), rugby, cricket, and tennis courts.

The main building on the campus is now Surrey Court, a three-storey facility equipped with laboratories, teaching rooms, a performing arts area, a restaurant, and the Learning Resource Centre.

College Court is a new teaching block with well-equipped classrooms for Social Sciences, Business, Mathematics, IT, Geography, and Art and Design. In addition, a separate wing is employed for musical activities.

The Music Centre played host to the music department, but the music courses have now been abandoned. It now runs as a creche facility.

== Students ==
Most of the students are from the 16-19 age group on full-time courses, along with a smaller adult education provision of daytime and evening courses.

The college currently enrolls around 500 full-time students aged 16 to 18 annually, with a further 500 adult part-time students within its adult education and community programme. In 2002/03, adults constituted only around 5% of the college's full-time equivalent students. The college works closely with local partner schools, from three of which it recruits most of its students. It also draws students from further afield, recruiting from around 40 schools in total. Over 80% of full-time students take advanced level (level 3) courses.

The majority of adult students are enrolled on English as a foreign language (EFL), childcare, general interest and basic skills courses. Most adults are on short courses.

== Notable alumni ==
- Michael Ball, actor, singer, radio and TV presenter
- Jeremy Hardy, comedian
- James Mates, journalist with ITV News
- Carl R May, sociologist
- Martin Millett, archaeologist
- Claire Wright, World Cup champion and Olympic trampolinist.
- Graham Thorpe England and Surrey Cricketer
