= Otway McCannell =

British painter (1883–1969)

- William Otway McCannell
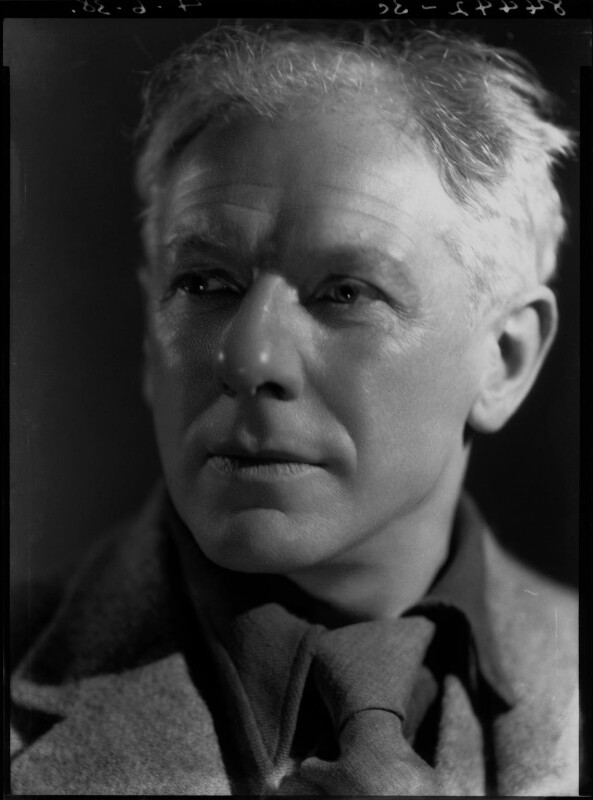
- Born: December 26, 1883; New Brighton, Cheshire, England
- Died: 1969
- Education: Nelson College, Royal College of Art
- Known for: Painting, illustration, writing
- Spouse: Winifred Cooper
- Children: Ursula McCannell
- Awards: FRSA, RBA

Otway McCannell FRSA RBA (1883 – 1969), also known as William Otway McCannell and W. Otway Cannell, was a British painter, illustrator, writer and Principal of Farnham School of Art.

== Biography ==
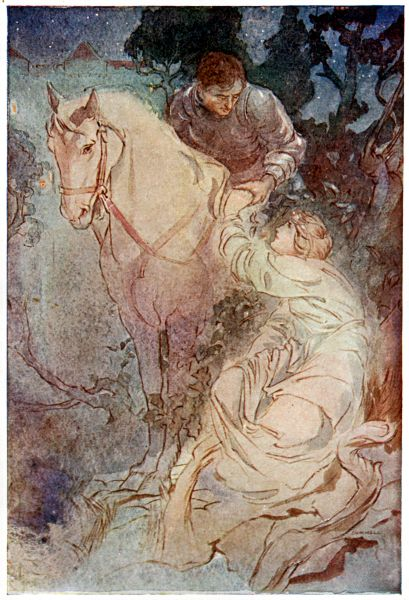
Illustration from Legends and Romances of Brittany (1917)

McCannell was born in the seaside resort of New Brighton in Wallasey, Cheshire, England on 26 December 1883.

After attending Nelson College in New Zealand in 1895, in 1905 he won an art scholarship at the Royal College of Art in London.

In the late 1920s McCannell moved to Farnham, England and was Principal of Farnham School of Art (later merged with Guildford School of Art and becoming the West Surrey College of Art and Design). His students included Geoffrey Burnand. McCannell retired in 1948.

McCannell frequently exhibited at the Royal Academy and other European centres. He exhibited The Devil's Chessboard at the Royal Academy in 1924.

He was a Fellow of Free Painters and Sculptors, a Fellow of the Royal Society of Arts and a member of the Royal Society of British Artists.

A number of photographic portraits by Bassano of the artist are in the National Portrait Gallery.

=== Illustrations ===
Among the books McCannell illustrated were:

- Legends and Romances of Brittany, 1917 (by Lewis Spence)
- Legends and Romance of Spain, 1931 (by Lewis Spence)
- The Rubaiyat of Omar Khayyam, 1950 (translated by Edward Fitzgerald)

=== Author ===
McCannell was the author of Fighting Types (1919) which contained portraits of men and women who had served in various branches of the armed forces in World War I.

=== Family ===
McCannell was the head of three generations of artists. His wife Winifred Cooper painted miniatures and they had one daughter, artist Ursula McCannell (1923-2015). McCannell taught art to his daughter at Farnham and she was extremely talented at an early age. At 16, she was the youngest member of the Women’s International Art Society and the youngest exhibitor at the Royal Academy. Ursula was married to artist Peter Rees Roberts who also taught with McCannell at Farnham and they had three sons (Tristan, Marcus and Lucien), all painters. In 1989 the entire family exhibited in "Three Generations" at the England & Co gallery in London.
