= Ursula McCannell =

British painter

Ursula Vivian McCannell
- Born: 11 June 1923; Hampstead Garden Suburb, London, UK
- Died: 16 January 2015 (aged 91); Farnham, Surrey, UK
- Education: Royal College of Art
- Known for: painting

Ursula Vivian McCannell (11 June 1923 – 16 January 2015) was a British painter known for depicting the Spanish Civil War in her early years. Her works are held in numerous private and public collections.

== Biography ==
Ursula Vivian McCannell was born in Hampstead Garden Suburb in 1923. Her father, William Otway McCannell, was a painter and teacher and her mother, Winifred Cooper, painted miniatures. When she was four years old the family moved to Farnham in Surrey where her father was appointed principal of the local School of Art. Her father taught her painting from her early years. At the age of 13, in 1936, McCannell traveled to Spain with her father, shortly before the outbreak of the Spanish Civil War, events which influenced McCannell for the rest of her life. She painted her impressions of the war, depicting refuges, peasants and others.

In 1939 McCannell was enrolled in the Farnham School of Art where she studied under her father till 1942. From 1942 to 1944 she studied at the Royal College of Art, RCA, under Professor Tristram.

=== Family ===
In 1945 McCannell married Peter Rees Roberts who she met while studying in the RCA. They had three sons: Tristan, an architect and painter; Marcus, a painter, lecturer and printmaker; and Lucien, a designer and painter. Their family home remained in Farnham, although McCannell made yearly visits to Spain and, from 1973, to County Cork for painting.

== Works and exhibitions ==
McCannell's paintings include landscapes, figurative subjects and portraits. She worked in a simple yet distinctive technique which conveyed the characters and likeness without being overexaggerated.

McCannell first exhibited her works in 1934 at the age of eleven at the Wertheim Gallery. Her Spanish Civil War paintings were exhibited at Redfern Gallery in London in 1938. At that time she was sixteen and it was her first major exhibition and she was elected a member of the Women's International Art Club.

In 1940 McCannell was the youngest artist to exhibit at the Royal Academy. She also exhibited at Royal Society of Portrait Painters and with The London Group. Solo shows were held at Gimpel Fins, Roland, as well as Browse and Delbanco galleries. Numerous solo and group shows followed at notable galleries and societies, including the Royal Academy, Leicester Galleries, Leger Gallery and at the New English Art Club. Her exhibitions were widely presented at the Ashgate Gallery in Farnham and Trackeray Gallery.

Starting from 1960 both McCannell and her husband regularly exhibited in Cadaqués in Spain, and it became their second home. In 1989 the entire McCannel/Rees Roberts family presented their exhibition “Three Generations” at the England & Co Gallery in London.

In June 2013 McCannell's last solo show was held at the Fosse Gallery, Stow-on-the-Wold, which was very successful. In 2015 McCannell's works, along with other 80 works of 30 artists, were included in Awareness and conflict: British Artists and Spanish Civil War, at the Pallant House Gallery, in Chichester.

McCannell's paintings are held in many public and private collections such as Contemporary Art Society and Manchester City Art Gallery.
