= Neil Haddon =

British-Australian painter

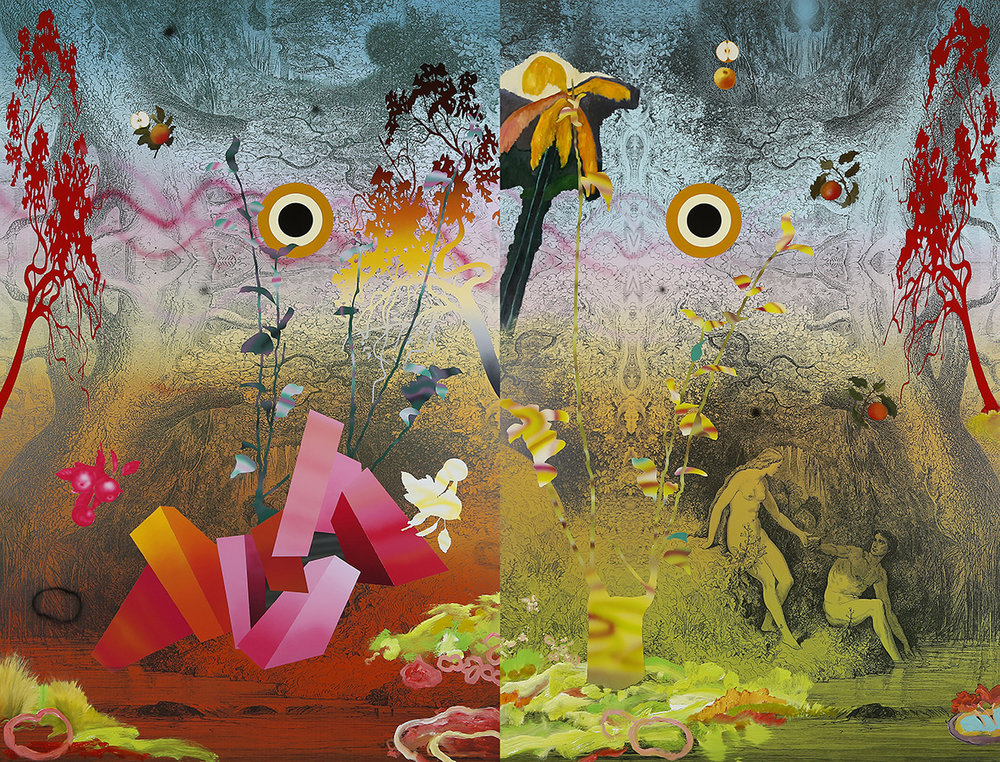
We Bring Our Own Fruit, Neil Haddon, 2017, oil, enamel and digital print on aluminium

Neil Haddon is a British-Australian painter. His paintings display a wide variety of influences and styles, from hard edge geometric abstraction to looser expressive figurative painting. Haddon has lived and worked in Hobart, Tasmania, since the late 1990s.

== Early life and education ==
Haddon was born in Epsom, England. He was born at "Eversleigh" in Worple Road – the former residence of the English writer George Gissing.

He earned a B-TEC Diploma in Art and Design from the Epsom School of Art, Surrey, England (1985–1987) (now the University for the Creative Arts), where he studied alongside the painter Cecily Brown. He received an Honours degree from West Surrey College of Art and Design (1987–1990) (now the University for the Creative Arts) where he studied under Stephen Farthing.

In 2020, he was awarded a Doctorate in Fine Art from the School of Creative Arts and Media, University of Tasmania (CAM).

== Career ==
Haddon relocated to Barcelona, Spain, in 1990 and lived and worked there until 1996. He maintained a studio in Cornellá throughout this period. He held his first solo exhibition at Galería Carles Poy in 1992. In 1996 he moved to Tasmania, Australia. He has lived and worked there since then.

He has held a variety of part-time teaching posts at the School of Creative Arts and Media, University of Tasmania. He was formerly Head of Painting and Associate Head of Art. In 2025, Haddon took on a voluntary role as an Adjunct Senior Researcher, concentrating on his studio practice since that time.

== Other activities ==
In 2014 Haddon undertook a three-month residency in New York at the Australia Council for the Arts Greene Street Studio. Haddon was the Chair of Contemporary Art Tasmania from 2010 to 2016 and was a board member of Salamanca Arts Centre from 2018 to 2022. In 2026, he was awarded the prestigious Rosamund McCulloch Studio at the Cité Internationale des Arts in Paris.

== Work ==
Haddon's paintings combine a wide range of influences and styles, from geometric abstraction to figuration. He has become known for using a variety of materials and techniques, from flat high gloss enamel painting to expressive oil painting. The sources for Haddon's paintings come from an array of visual media that includes local newspaper images, archival photographs of Australia and the UK, and the paintings of earlier 'colonial' artists such as John Glover and Paul Gauguin. His paintings have been described as "a meta-landscape mash up of samples from John Glover and Paul Gauguin and the reflectiveness of your granny's ornamental biscuit tins". Kelly Gellatly, senior curator of contemporary art at the National Gallery of Victoria described Haddon's work as abstract painting that "doesn't depict a traditional landscape but is evocative in its use of darker aspects of landscape." Haddon describes working from these sources as "a process of razing an image to the ground and then building back up." Andrew Frost of The Guardian described Haddon's 2016 painting I Read Day of the Triffids When I Lived in England (and now I Live in Tasmania) as "a delightful post-painting nightmare." Since 2017, Haddon's diverse work has explored themes of displacement and identity, influenced by his migratory experiences and lutruwita/Tasmania's colonial history. This work is framed by theories of migratory aesthetics.

== Exhibitions ==
Haddon's paintings have been exhibited in Australia, the US, and Europe. Exhibitions include: Theatre of the World, MONA (and La Maison Rouge, Paris) curated by Jean-Hubert Martin, Platform Los Angeles, Strange Trees, Tasmanian Museum and Art Gallery, Hobart; and MOP Gallery, Sydney. His paintings were featured in Ten Days on the Island, 2003 and were described by Daniel Thomas as "a high-spirited meeting of Pop art and popular culture with austere reto-Futurist abstraction." He has held several solo exhibitions at Bett Gallery, Hobart and This Is No Fantasy, Melbourne.

Haddon's paintings appeared on the cover and liner notes of the Australian Chamber Orchestra recording Scenes, and his paintings Wear No.4 was reproduced in the MONA publication Art from MONA that your child could have made.

== Collections ==
Haddon's work is held in private and public collections internationally and in Australia by the National Gallery of Victoria, Artbank; the Tasmanian Museum and Art Gallery; the University of Tasmania Fine Art Collection; Devonport Regional Gallery, and the Queen Victoria Museum and Art Gallery, Launceston.

== Awards ==
The Visit (2018), winner of Hadley's Art Prize.

Haddon's painting "The Visit", inspired by his migration to Tasmania and H. G. Wells' novel The War of the Worlds was awarded the A$100,000 Hadley's Art Prize in 2018. Hadley's Prize judge and Tasmanian Museum and Art Gallery curator, Jane Stewart, described the painting as "a complex and accomplished painting that raises many questions about landscape, custodianship and contact history".

His painting "Portrait with Paperchains", featuring Timothy Walker CBE, chief executive and artistic director of the London Philharmonic Orchestra, was awarded the A$25,000 City of Whyalla Art Prize in 2011. Haddon returned to judge the Whyalla Prize in 2013.

"Purblind (Opiate)" won the $25,000 Glover Prize (Tasmania) 2008.

"Survivor (del tink gyp flynn)" was awarded the City of Devonport Art Award in 2006.

His paintings have been selected for other significant art prizes, including both the Wynne Prize and the Sulman Prize, both at Art Gallery of New South Wales.

His work "It's Difficult (this Tasmanian landscape)" was also a finalist in the $50,000 Arthur Guy Memorial Painting Prize at the Bendigo Art Gallery in 2023.
