= Scott Brown (gymnast) =

Australian trampoline gymnast

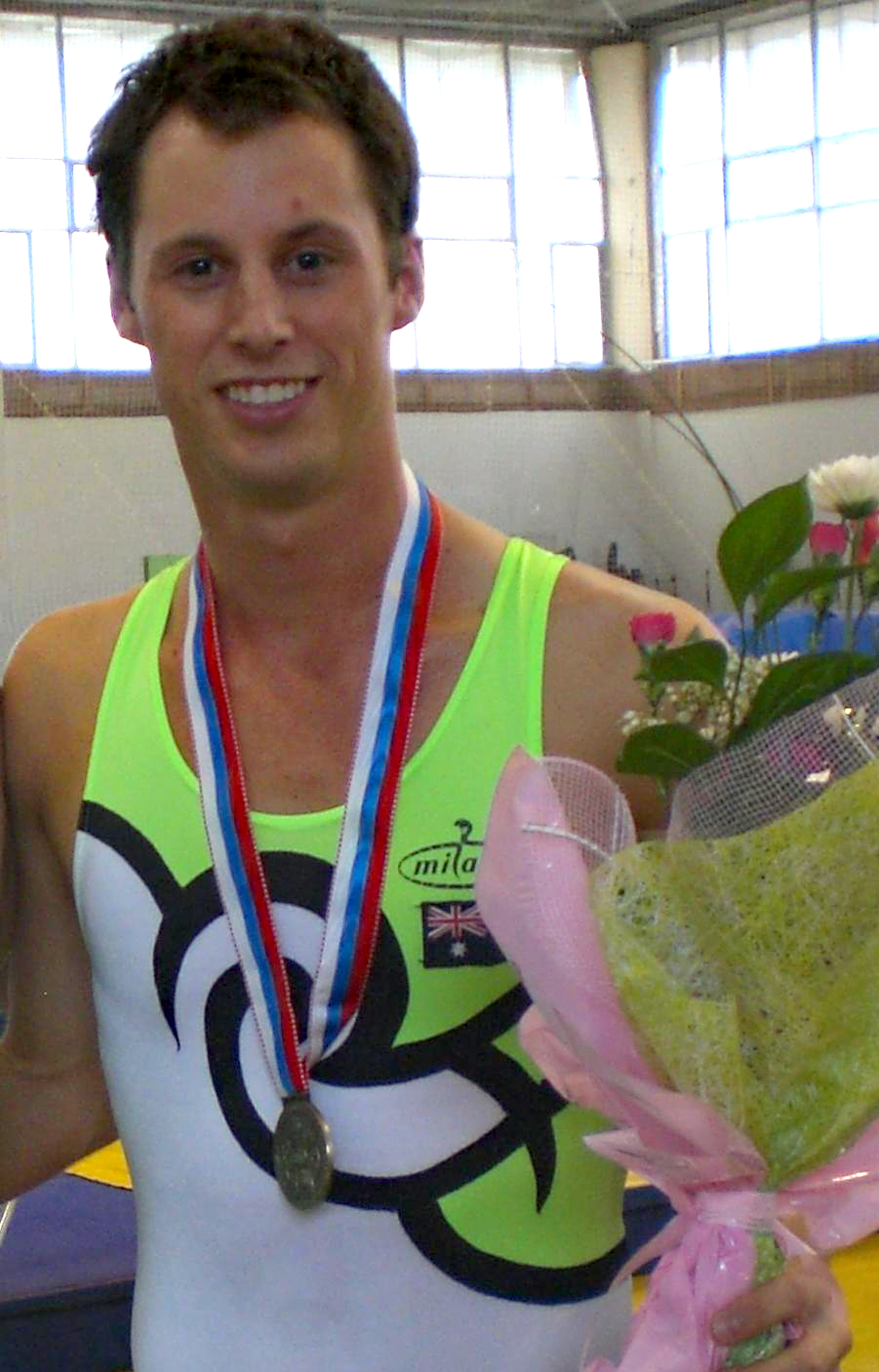

Personal information
- Nickname: Scottie
- Born: 1983 (42–43) Gosford
- Height: 175 cm (5 ft 9 in)

Gymnastics career
- Discipline: Trampoline gymnastics
- Country represented: Australia
- Head coach: Nikolay Zhuravlev
Medal record
Men's trampoline gymnastics
Representing Australia
World Championships
Silver medal – second place	2007 Quebec	Synchro
World Cup Final
Silver medal – second place	2008 Togliatti	Synchro

Scott Brown (born 1983) is an Australian trampoline gymnast. Brown has been most successful in synchronised trampolining, achieving a silver medal with partner Ben Wilden at the 2007 Trampoline World Championships.

Brown began trampolining at the Central Coast Youth Club in Gosford. He was spotted by the head coach of Australia, Nikolay Zhuravlev, who offered to train him.

After several years of training at The Trampoline Sports Academy (TTSA), Brown began competing at an international level in 1995 and went on to compete in World Cup events, his first being in 2000. He gained the ranking of Number One in Australia on six occasions (2001, 2002, 2003, 2004, 2006 and 2008).

The National Trampoline Program moved to South Australia in 2005, with the promise of better funding and facilities at the South Australia Sports Institute (SASI). Brown moved to Adelaide to resume his training, where he continued to excel, gaining his best results in synchronised trampolining with his partner Ben Wilden.

Scott retired from trampolining after the World Cup Final in 2008, where he was placed second in the Synchronised event.
