= Periodic table (disambiguation) =

The periodic table is a tabular arrangement of the chemical elements.

Periodic table may also refer to:

== Sciences ==
- Periodic table (crystal structure), a variant of the periodic table of chemical elements
- Periodic table (electron configurations), a variant of the periodic table of chemical elements

== Literature ==
- The Periodic Table (short story collection), by Primo Levi, 1975
- The Periodic Table (Basher book), a 2007 children's science book

== See also ==
- Alternative periodic tables
- Extended periodic table
- Periodic table of topological invariants
