= Stephen Farthing =

English painter

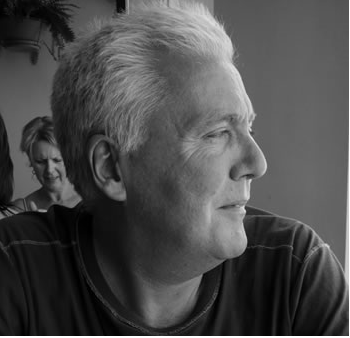
Image of Stephen Farthing

Stephen Farthing RA (born 16 September 1950) is an English painter and writer of art history.

== Education ==
Stephen Farthing grew up in London and earned a bachelor's degree from Saint Martin's School of Art in 1973 and a master's degree in painting from the Royal College of Art, London in 1976. In the final year of his master's program, Farthing won a scholarship to study at the British School at Rome for one year.

== Life and career ==
Since his return from Italy in 1977, Farthing has had one-man shows in the UK, Brazil, Uruguay, Mexico, Australia, Japan, and the United States. Farthing's work was featured in the 1989 São Paulo Biennale and that same year he served as the Artist in Residence at the Hayward Gallery in London. He also won prizes in the John Moores Liverpool Exhibition on eight occasions between 1976 and 1999.

Farthing was elected as a member of the Royal Academy of Arts in 1998. Farthing's work is in the National Portrait Gallery. He showed at Tate Britain in 2006 as part of a project called "Drawing from Turner," which he designed and curated. Farthing painted large murals for the Cleveland Browns Football Club in Cleveland, Ohio (2004) and Aston Villa Football Club in Birmingham, UK (2008).

Stephen Farthing's teaching career began at Canterbury College of Art (1977–79) where he was a lecturer of painting. He went on to teach at the Royal College of Art (1980–85) before becoming Head of Painting and later Head of Fine Art at West Surrey College of Art and Design (1985–89). Farthing spent the next ten years at Oxford University serving as the Ruskin Master at the Ruskin School of Drawing and Fine Art. He was also made a Professorial Fellow of Oxford's St Edmund Hall (1990–2000). Upon leaving the University of Oxford in 2000, Farthing was made a professor emeritus of St Edmund Hall.

Farthing moved to New York in 2000 to become the Executive Director of the New York Academy of Art and led the Academy until he became the Rootstein Hopkins Research Chair of Drawing at the University of the Arts London in 2004, a position he held until 2017.

Farthing has published extensively. He is best known for his authorship of 1001 Paintings You Must See Before You Die and 501 Great Artists. He authored the Intelligent Person's Guide to Modern Art, published in 2000, in addition to numerous academic essays and journal articles.

== Work ==
Farthing described his work in a 2005 interview, saying "I have dined with the devil in terms of becoming a modern artist. I have taken hold of history, tried to understand it—and then used and abused it."

Farthing's work reflects his education, personal experience and perspective on historical events that have captured his imagination. After spending a period of study at the Cité internationale des arts in Paris while a student at the Royal College of Art, Stephen Farthing inadvertently fell upon what one could later describe as a postmodernist relationship with history. In Paris, he painted an interpretation of Hyacinthe Rigaud's portrait of Louis XV that as a student won him a prize at the John Moores Exhibition in Liverpool, today this painting stands as an early example of British post modernist painting.

In the late 1980s and early 1990s whilst showing with Edward Totah in London, Farthing showed works that positioned Latin American vernacular culture within a modernist idiom and classicism within the vernacular.

During the 1990s, he reinvented history painting as a viable contemporary narrative taking on subject matters as diverse as the Battle of Trafalgar, swagger portraiture, and the topographical mapping of cities. His most recent work makes explicit a theme that has consistently sat between Farthing and his audience, the "narrative" and "text".

Farthing commented that his work is, "not this thing about 'Oh, let's let the audience make up their mind what it is'…" but about "degrading it on purpose so it becomes not more ambiguous, but less what it was in the first place."

Toward the end of 2009, Farthing had his first one-person show at the Purdy Hicks Gallery in London where he debuted his "back-story" paintings. The "back-story" paintings are a series of images painted with a text in reverse sitting on the picture plane between the audience and the image. The text informs the viewer what is going on behind the picture as opposed to in front of it, simultaneously compromising and informing the image with text.

In November 2010, Farthing became the second living Royal Academician to be featured in the "laboratory" series of one man shows at the Royal Academy of Arts London. "The Back Story," featured an epic 30-foot painting of the Atlantic Ocean.

Farthing's work as a painter sits midway between the conservative and the cutting edge between a classical and radical painting.

== Bibliography ==
- Ruskin and Art Education 1836–1993, Review of the Pre-Raphaelite Society, no.3, Autumn.1993
- The Knowledge, The Artist's Eye, Essay Arts Review, paintings of SE1.1995
- Cornelia Hesse Honegger, exhibition catalogue, interview with Dr Stephen Simpson, edited by Paul Bonaventura, published by Locus +, Newcastle.1997
- In a Valley of the Restless Mind, Hilary Davis, Enitharmon, 1997 ISBN 1-870612-97-3.
- International Minds, front cover by Stephen Farthing
- Instructions For Use, English translation of Mode d'emploi, Editions, Jannink, Paris, ISBN 2-902462-48-4.
- Mode d'emploi, Stephen Farthing, Edition Jannink, funded by the British Council, Paris, 1999 ISBN 2-902462-44-1,
- New Contemporaries, catalogue essay with Paul Bonaventura, 1999
- The Higher Education Journal, Vol. 10, March Fine Art, The Cinderella Subject, Stephen Farthing, 1999
- Intelligent Persons Guide to Modern Art, Stephen Farthing, Duckworth, London, 2000 ISBN 0-7156-2944-1.
- British School at Rome Centenary, edited by Andrew-Wallace Hadrill, chapter "Post War Art 1945-75", 2002 ISBN 0-904152-35-9.
- Will Barnet: in his own words, edited by Sandra April and Stephen Farthing, NYAA, 2004 New York.
- A Curriculum for Artists, edited by Stephen Farthing and Paul Bonaventura, University of Oxford & NYAA, 2004 ISBN 0-9538525-3-9.
- Dirtying the Paper Delicately, University of the Arts, London. 2005
- Jerwood Drawing Prize, Drawing: The Bigger Picture, catalogue essay, 2005, ISBN 0-948327-20-0.
- Short Stories about Painting, edited by Jeffrey Dennis, essay, The Unpaintable, Art Space Gallery 2005, ISBN 0-9549623-2-X.
- 1001 Paintings You Must See Before You Die, 2006, edited by Stephen Farthing. Cassell. 2006 ISBN 978-1-84403-563-2, ISBN 1-84403-563-8.
- Writing on Drawing, 2008, edited by Steven Garner, with essay by Stephen Farthing and introduction by Anita Taylor. Published by Intellect, ISBN 978-1-84150-200-7.
- 501 Great Artists, A Comprehensive Guide to the Giants of the Art World, 2008, USA Publisher: Barron's Educational Series. New Zealand Publisher: Penguin. ISBN 0-7641-6133-4 . ISBN 978-0-7641-6133-9.
