= Geoffrey Burnand =

British soldier and artist (1912–1997)

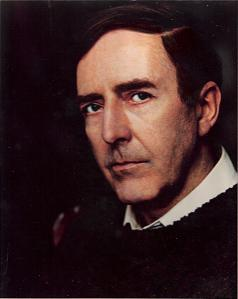
- Born: Geoffrey Norman Burnand; 1 January 1912; Hastings, Sussex, England
- Died: 17 August 1997 (aged 85); Chelmsford, Essex, England
- Education: Farnham School of Art, Surrey, England, Royal Academy Schools, London, England, British School at Rome, Italy
- Known for: Painting, Scenography
- Movement: Realism, Expressionism
- Awards: British Prix de Rome 1932

Geoffrey Burnand (1 January 1912 – 17 August 1997) was an English painter, theatrical designer and mural artist.

== Biography ==
=== Early life ===
Geoffrey Burnand was born in Hastings, Sussex to an English father, a Colonel in the British Army, and an Irish mother. His first noted ambition was at the age of six, when he wished to be a composer. His father was not keen on such an idea, as alluded to in Geoffrey's later recollection of his father's reaction when his ambitions turned towards painting: "My father agreed I could become a painter because he felt there was more chance of making a career in that field." His love of classical music would remain and serve as the basis for a series of later expressionist paintings, particularly after 1980.

=== Education ===
Geoffrey attended the Imperial Service College, Windsor until the age of 14½ when an agreement with his father enabled him to leave for Farnham School of Art, Farnham, Surrey. "We struck a bargain and I think it was a fair one. I could train to be a painter as long as I didn't let my hair grow long or let any of my funny friends from the Royal Academy walk across his barrack square." He studied at Farnham under the Principal Otway McCannell, A.R.A. R.B.A. from 1929 through to 1931.

He went on to study at the Royal Academy Schools under the tutelage of Sir Walter Thomas Monnington from 1931 to 1932.

Winning the prestigious British Prix de Rome award (Painting Category) in 1932, at the age of 20, provided Geoffrey with a scholarship to the British School at Rome. He studied the history and techniques of the Old Masters at the BSR from 1933 to 1935.

=== Further travel ===
The Prix de Rome award, in addition to providing a scholarship to the British School at Rome, also provided Geoffrey with the funds to make several study trips to Germany in the early-mid 1930s. It was on these trips he discovered the works of the German expressionist artists George Grosz, Franz Marc and Max Beckmann, the latter of whom he met in person during a trip to Berlin. He found considerable stimulus in their work and the influence of it latterly informed much of his own.

=== Military service ===
At the outbreak of the Second World War, Burnand returned to England and was ushered into the army. Having spent most of the previous few years of his life in Italy and Germany, it was difficult to now consider them enemies. He would later say "Then I had to go and fight them. Didn't think much of that." Following his attendance of Royal Military College, Sandhurst, Burnand was commissioned and would go on to become a captain and serve in his father's old regiment until the conclusion of the war in 1945. During this period, he produced sketches and drawings of some of the troubling sights he encountered but only painted during periods of leave.

=== Scenic painting ===
When demobbed, Geoffrey was determined not to return home without first obtaining a job. He went to his local rep, the Little Theatre in Nottingham (later to become the Nottingham Playhouse) and became a scenic painter. He had no prior experience of scenic painting but was hired on the basis of photographs of his work. While employed there he would have to paint up to three different sets every Sunday. Similar work followed at various other rep theatres including the Liverpool Playhouse and Royal Hippodrome Theatre in Eastbourne.

Regard for Burnand's work in the medium was sufficiently high for him to be hired to work at a number of famous opera houses, including the Royal Opera House in the London district of Covent Garden, Glyndebourne opera house near Lewes in East Sussex, and the Teatro di San Carlo opera house in Naples, Italy, on a production of Boris Godunov. He also worked on various panto productions and variety shows at the London Palladium and painted the original sets for a production of My Fair Lady in New York City, from designs by Cecil Beaton.

=== Film and television ===
Geoffrey painted audience stills for the BBC, which were used in early television programmes, and was one of the first painters hired by the fledgling ITV in 1955. He worked for over a decade at Wembley Studios in Wembley, London for ITV's London contractor Associated-Rediffusion (later renamed Rediffusion London).

In time he worked on a number of feature films. Examples of his work can be seen in Diamonds For Breakfast (1968) (including four large portraits of star Marcello Mastroianni) and The Pied Piper (1972) (including many of the mediaeval monsters in the dungeons).

=== Draftsman and portrait painter ===
Burnand was an accomplished draftsman and often-painted large multi figured compositions in the style of Max Beckmann. He was also an accomplished portrait painter. The artist painted almost exclusively on canvas and signed his work with his initials. He lived at Bordon, Hampshire after the war and later moved to Little Baddow, Essex.
