= William Henry David Birch =

British painter

- Born: 19th of May 1895; Epsom, Surrey, England, British Empire
- Died: 10th of March 1968; Epsom, Surrey, England, United Kingdom
- Education: Epsom School of Art, Goldsmiths’ College School of Art
- Known for: British artist, painter, illustrator

William Henry David Birch, also known as David Birch R.O.I. (May 19, 1895, Epsom, Surrey, England, British Empire – March 10, 1968, Epsom, Surrey, England, United Kingdom) was a British artist, painter and illustrator.

David Birch was the Principal of Epsom and Ewell School of Art started from 1930 and retired in 1961.

== Biography ==
David Birch was born in Epsom, Surrey, England on May 19, 1895. He studied at Epsom School of Art where he was a student of William Henry Osmond (1865-1943), the first Principal of this school, and at Goldsmiths’ College School of Art.

He was invalided out of World War I in 1915 and spent the next three years working at HM Stationery Office continuing his art education and training. He took up book illustration and later became a part time art teacher in London.

In 1930, he was appointed as Principal of the Epsom and Ewell School of Art and held this position for over 30 years, retiring in 1961.

From 1935 Birch focused on landscape painting in the Constable tradition. He began exhibiting regularly at the Royal Academy, Royal Institute of Oil Painters, Royal Society of British Artists, Royal Glasgow Institute of the Fine Arts and other major galleries. His works were widely reproduced, notably by Royle Publications and others.

In 1945 he was elected as a member of the Royal Institute of Oil Painters (ROI).

In 1959, a catalogue of David Birch’s landscapes was published under the title Landscape Paintings Exhibition Catalogue. English and Welsh Landscape.

He died on 10 March 1968 in Epsom.

Nowadays, Brighton Museum and Art Gallery, other galleries and private collections holds and exhibits his works. There is at least one known depiction of David Birch - a pencil drawing portrait created by British painter Sir Stanley Spencer in 1943.
