= Jeffrey Tate =

English conductor

Sir Jeffrey Tate CBE
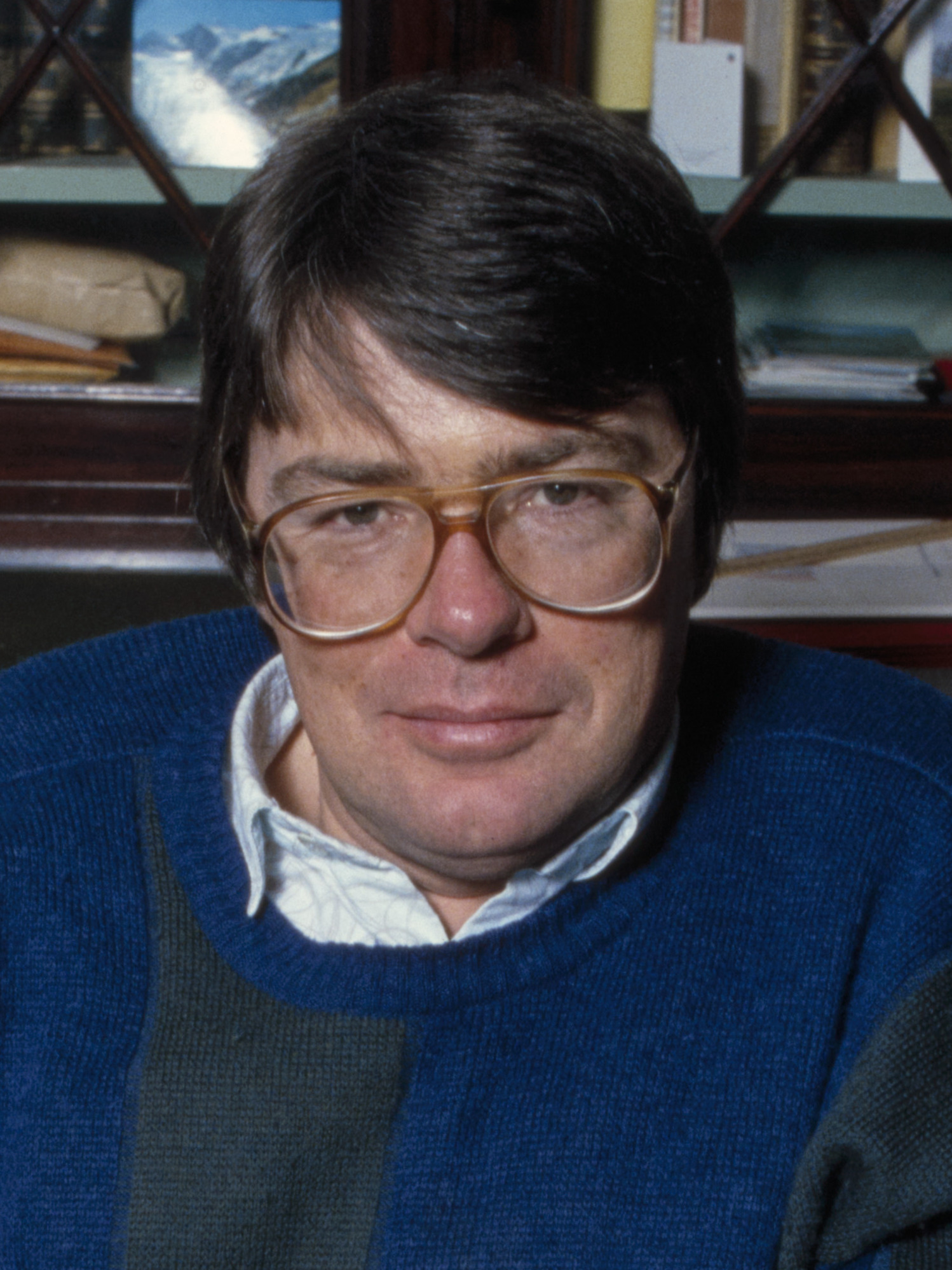
- Born: Jeffrey Philip Tate; 28 April 1943; Salisbury, Wiltshire, England
- Died: 2 June 2017 (aged 74); Bergamo, Lombardy, Italy
- Education: Farnham Grammar School
- Alma mater: Cambridge University; Christ's College, Cambridge
- Occupation: Conductor
- Years active: 1979–2017
- Spouse: Klaus Kuhlemann (m. 1977)
- Awards: Knight Bachelor (2017); Commander of the Order of the British Empire (1990)

Sir Jeffrey Philip Tate CBE (28 April 1943 – 2 June 2017) was an English conductor of classical music. Tate was born with spina bifida and had an associated spinal curvature. After studying medicine at the University of Cambridge and beginning a medical career in London, he switched to music and worked under Georg Solti at the Royal Opera House, Covent Garden, before making his conducting debut in 1979 at the Metropolitan Opera, New York. He held conducting appointments with the English Chamber Orchestra, Rotterdam Philharmonic Orchestra and Hamburg Symphony Orchestra, among others, and was the first person to be appointed principal conductor of the Royal Opera House. He was knighted for his services to music in 2017.

== Early life ==
Tate was born in Salisbury, England, with spina bifida, a major birth defect, and also had an associated spinal curvature, kyphosis. His family moved to Farnham, Surrey, when he was young and he attended Farnham Grammar School between 1954 and 1961, gaining a State Scholarship to Cambridge University, where he directed theatre productions. He took piano lessons until he was ten, switching to the cello. During his university years and just after he went to major music events "I listened while I was at Cambridge and when I came to London ... to the Goodall Mastersingers, to Giulini and Klemperer conducting the Philharmonia, to Monteux's last concerts with the LSO. London was fantastically exciting. It gave me my musical standard". At Cambridge he was in the Madrigal Society (conducted by Raymond Leppard) and directed a few plays which led him into opera. He accompanied John Kentish and later found himself working on parts of Götterdämmerung with Anne Evans.

Tate initially read medicine at Christ's College, Cambridge (1961–64), specializing in eye surgery. He later worked at St Thomas's Hospital, London, before giving up his clinical career to study music at the London Opera Centre from 1970 to 1971. He became a repetiteur and a coach at the Royal Opera House, Covent Garden, under the tutelage of Sir Georg Solti. He accompanied Maria Callas in the concert aria Ah! perfido by Beethoven in 1976, one of last recordings Callas made, and reissued in a 2023 complete set.

== Career ==
Tate was a musical assistant to Pierre Boulez for the centenary production of The Ring at Bayreuth in 1976, also working with the conductor on Lulu for the historic 1979 production at the Paris Opéra which restored Act 3. Tate's international conducting début was in Carmen at the Gothenburg Opera in 1978. Working as a repetiteur on a Ring revival in Cologne in 1977, Ragnar Ulfung, then director of the Gothenburg company, and Donald McIntyre, proposed that he conduct a production of Carmen; Tate was initially reluctant; "At Covent Garden I'd said firmly that I only wanted to be a repetiteur. If you're a good repetiteur that's extremely satisfying. The privilege of working as I'd done with great conductors as their assistant is the next best thing to conducting". Tate also had worries about his physical ability for conducting a whole opera, but Carmen was successful and he was invited back to conduct a new production of Die Zauberflöte.

Tate conducted the Metropolitan Opera in New York City in 1980. His range at the Royal Opera House encompassed Mozart (La clemenza di Tito in 1982, Così fan tutte in 1989, Le nozze di Figaro in 1991, Idomeneo in 1989), Strauss (Ariadne auf Naxos in 1985, Der Rosenkavalier in 1989, Arabella in 1990), Wagner (Lohengrin in 1988, Der fliegende Holländer in 2011) and French repertoire (Manon in 1987, Les Contes d'Hoffmann in 1991, Carmen in 1994).

In 1985, he was appointed the first principal conductor of the English Chamber Orchestra (ECO), with which group he undertook a recording of all the symphonies by Mozart for EMI in the 1980s, and held the post until 2000. Other recordings with the ECO included late symphonies of Haydn, and a Mozart piano concerto cycle with Mitsuko Uchida. In 1982 he won the 'Outstanding First Achievement of the Year in Opera' for conducting Mozart's La clemenza di Tito, at the Royal Opera House in June 1981, in the SWET (now Olivier) Awards. In September 1986, Tate became principal conductor of the Royal Opera House, Covent Garden, the first person in the company's history to have that title. He held this Covent Garden post until 1991, and subsequently became principal guest conductor at Covent Garden from 1991 to 1994. He was principal conductor of the Rotterdam Philharmonic Orchestra from 1991 to 1995. In 2005, Tate was appointed music director of the San Carlo Theatre of Naples, remaining in the post until 2010. He created the Rolf Liebermann opera La Forêt, based on Ostrovsky's The Forest, in Geneva in April 1987. He conducted The Ring at the Théâtre du Châtelet in Paris in 1994,

In October 2007, the Hamburg Symphony Orchestra announced the appointment of Tate as its next chief conductor, and he took up the post in 2009. In 2014, the orchestra announced the extension of his contract as chief conductor until 2019, and he held the post until his death in June 2017. Tate was principal guest conductor and artistic adviser of the Adelaide Symphony Orchestra, in part as a result of his association with the orchestra from a 1998 production of the Ring, from 2016 until his death.

The Opera magazine obituary noted that his "recordings, notably of Lulu, Hänsel und Gretel and Elektra, demonstrate his emotive power and continual care that the singing should never be drowned by the pit".

Tate was president of UK Spina Bifida charity ASBAH (now SHINE [Spina Bifida, Hydrocephalus, Information, Networking, Equality]) from 1989. A portrait of Jeffrey Tate is in David Blum's book Quintet, Five Journeys toward Musical Fulfillment (Cornell University Press, 1999). It originally appeared as an article on 30 April 1990 issue of The New Yorker.

In private life, Tate was partners with Klaus Kuhlemann, a German geomorphologist, whom he met when conducting at Cologne from 1977. Tate has described this situation as being an outsider on two scores:

The gay world is immensely hung up with physical perfection for some curious reason ... Therefore, being disabled in that world is harder.

Tate and Kuhlemann eventually married.

Tate was made a Knight Bachelor in the 2017 New Year Honours for services to British music overseas. He was also appointed a Commander of the Order of the British Empire (CBE) in the 1990 Birthday Honours. Tate conducted his last concerts on 30 and 31 May 2017, in Bolzano and Trento, with the Haydn Orchestra. He died of a heart attack in Bergamo, Lombardy, Italy, on 2 June 2017 at the age of 74. Kuhlemann, his spouse, survives him.

== Discography ==
As well as his Mozart cycles, his English Chamber Orchestra discography also includes English music by Bax, Bridge, Butterworth and Moeran, Verklärte Nacht, Metamorphosen, and the Missa Solemnis; he conducted the Canteloube Songs of the Auvergne for Kiri Te Kanawa in 1982 and 1983. His version of incidental music to Peer Gynt by Grieg with the Berlin Philharmonic and soloist Sylvia McNair was described by Diapason magazine in a survey as a "vital, almost breathless", almost ideal recording.

As a keyboard player he played organ for recordings of Vivaldi choral works in the 1970s, and was part of the continuo for Le nozze di Figaro in 1982, conducted by Georg Solti on Decca.

== Videography ==
- The Metropolitan Opera Centennial Gala (1983), Deutsche Grammophon DVD, 00440–073–4538
- Recording of a live televised English Chamber Orchestra concert from the Schloss Schönbrunn, Vienna on 16 November 1990; Mozart: Symphony No.36 in C K425 "Linz", Piano Concerto No.17 in G K453 (with Dezsö Ránki) and Symphony No.41 in C K551 "Jupiter", issued in parts on laserdisc (Philips 070 141.1PHG), VHS (Philips 070 141.3PHG), DVD (ArtHaus Musik 100 081, EuroArts 201021.8, and Brilliant Classics 92819) and Blu-ray (EuroArts 200102.4).

Cultural offices
Preceded by no predecessor	Principal Conductor, English Chamber Orchestra; 1985–2000	Succeeded by Ralf Gothóni
Preceded by James Conlon	Principal Conductor, Rotterdam Philharmonic Orchestra; 1991–1995	Succeeded by Valery Gergiev
Preceded by Gary Bertini	Music Director, Teatro di San Carlo in Naples; 2005–2010	Succeeded by Nicola Luisotti
Preceded by Andrey Boreyko	Chief Conductor, Hamburg Symphony Orchestra; 2009–2017	Succeeded by Sylvain Cambreling
