= Mu Yongfeng =

Chinese trampoline gymnast

- Born: 19 September 1983 (age 42) Shanxi, China

Gymnastics career
- Discipline: Trampoline gymnastics
- Country represented: China

Mu Yongfeng (Chinese: 穆勇峰, born 19 September 1983) is a Chinese trampoline gymnast. He represented China at the 2004 Summer Olympics in Athens, Greece in the men's trampoline event. He finished in 10th place in the qualification round.
