= Simon Basher =

English writer, illustrator and artist

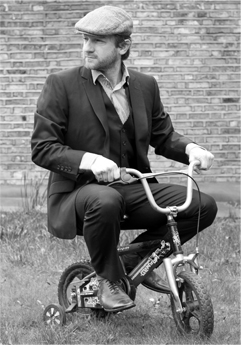
- Born: Simon Coleman
- Occupations: Writer, illustrator
- Years active: 2000–present
- Website: https://basherscience.com

Simon Basher is an English artist, illustrator and author based in Amsterdam. He is best known for his illustrated children's reference books, particularly the Basher Science series, which includes The Periodic Table, the world's best-selling children's book on the periodic table of the elements.

== Life and career ==
Basher studied illustration at both the Epsom School of Art and Design (which merged with Surrey Institute of Art & Design, University College in 1994) and Lincoln College, Lincolnshire. After graduating in 1992, he was a member of the rock / hip-hop band Boasti who enjoyed indie rock chart success and toured with Senser, Chumbawamba and Dub War. From 1995, he worked as a session musician for various record labels including EMI, Rhythm King and Talkin' Loud both in London and New York City. He toured the UK extensively with different acts and was a performer with the band Posh at the Songs & Visions Carlsberg Concert Tour at Wembley Stadium in 1997. From 1998, he ran a musician and artist management company and along with record producer Paul Epworth was one of the founding members of the 93 Feet East music venue.

In 2000, Simon returned to art and illustration. Working under the name Basher, he created his manga character style exhibiting and selling original artwork and limited edition prints both internationally and in the U.K. In 2002 and 2006, he exhibited at two solo shows 'look how bright and brave they are' and 'Hello Oddbod' in The Truman Brewery, Brick Lane, London. In 2004, the Basher clothing range was launched in Selfridges. In 2007, the first book in the Basher Science series, The Periodic Table, was published by Kingfisher to critical and commercial acclaim. He has since published over 50 books across eight series including Basher Science, History, Basics and Go!Go! BoBo. His art style has been best described as "graphic surrealism". His books are available in over twenty countries and have sold nearly 4 million copies worldwide. In 2017, the Basher Science toy line was launched in the US in partnership with Mattel. Basher books are available in more than 20 countries, including the UK, USA, South Korea, Japan and China and have sold nearly four million copies worldwide.

== Work ==
Basher received a Graphic Design HND from Lincoln College of Art in 1992, with contemporaries such as Lydia Monks (see Julia Donaldson).

Starting in 2006, Basher began writing and illustrating a series of books aimed at making science relevant and interesting. His first work was "Rocks and Minerals", which he wrote with illustrator Dan Green, which was published in December 2006. His second book, on the Periodic Table, invited the reader to enjoy "Elements with Style!". While Dan Green works with most of Basher's later books, The Periodic Table was written with Adrian Dingle, and was published in 2007. It received positive reviews from Publishers Weekly and the Royal Society of Chemistry, and it is the most successful of Basher's books.

In 2011 Basher started a series of books for toddlers called Go!Go! BoBo.

== Bibliography ==
All titles were published by Kingfisher, a division of Macmillan Publishers, except as indicated.

=== Science Series ===
- Rocks and Minerals: A Gem of a Book! (2006)
- The Periodic Table: Elements With Style! (2007)
- Physics: Why Matter Matters! (2008)
- Biology: Life as We Know It! (2008)
- Astronomy: Out of This World! (2009)
- Planet Earth: What Planet Are You On? (2010)
- Chemistry: Getting a Big Reaction! (2010)
- Algebra and Geometry: Anything But Square! (2011)
- Human Body: A Book With Guts! (2011)
- Oceans: Making Waves! (2012)
- Technology: a Byte-Sized World! (2012)
- Extreme Physics: Take a Quantum Leap...to the Edge of Science (2013)
- Extreme Biology: From Superbugs to Clones... Get to the Edge of Science (2013)
- Climate Change: A Hot Topic! (2015)
- Microbiology: It's a Small World! (2015)
- The Complete Periodic Table: More Elements With Style! (2015)
- Engineering: The Riveting World of Buildings and Machines (2017)
- A to Z of Science (2019)

=== Basics Series ===
- Math: A Book You Can Count On! (2010)
- Punctuation: The Write Stuff! (2010)
- Grammar: The Bill of Writes! (2011)
- Music: Hit the Right Note! (2011)
- Dinosaurs: The Bare Bones! (2012)
- Weather: Whipping Up a Storm! (2012)
- Creative Writing: The Plot Thickens! (2013)
- Space Exploration: It IS Rocket Science! (2013)

=== Basher STEM Junior Series ===
- STEM Science (2020)
- STEM Technology (2020)
- STEM Engineering (2020)
- STEM Math (2020)

=== Individual Titles ===
- Basher ABC (2012)
- Basher 123 (2012)
- Basher Science Sticker Book (2012)
- Money: How to Save, Spend, and Manage Your Moolah (2021)

=== Superstars Series ===
- Superstars of History (2014), published by Scholastic Corporation
- Superstars of Science (2014), published by Scholastic Corporation

=== History Series ===
- U.S. Presidents: Oval Office All-stars (2013)
- Mythology: the Stuff of Legends! (also known as Mythology: Oh My! Gods and Goddesses) (2013)
- States And Capitals: United we Stand! (2014)
- Civics: Democracy Rules! (2020)
- Legendary Creatures: Unleash the Beasts! (2021)
- National Parks: Where the Wild Things Are! (2022)

=== Geography Series ===
- Countries of the World: an Atlas With Attitude! (2018)

=== Mini Series ===
- Pandemic: When a Virus Goes Viral (2021)
- Green Technology: The Ultimate Clean-up Act! (2021)
- Artificial Intelligence: When Computers Get Smart! (2022)
- Chess: We’ve Got All the Best Moves! (2022)
- Forensics: Cracking Cases! (2023)
- Extreme Weather: It’s Really Wild! (2023)

=== Go!Go! BoBo Series ===
- Colors (US) (2011)
- Colours (UK) (2011)
- Shapes (2011)
- Time (2012)
- Opposites (2012)

=== Coding Series ===
- Code your own Website, with Hansel Lynn and Wayne Teng of theCoderSchool (2019)
- Coding with Scratch, with Hansel Lynn and Wayne Teng of theCoderSchool (2019)
