= Michail Pelivanidis =

Greek trampoline gymnast (born 1972)

- Born: 9 October 1972 (age 53)

Gymnastics career
- Discipline: Trampoline gymnastics
- Country represented: Greece

Michail Pelivanidis (born 9 October 1972) is a Greek trampoline gymnast. He represented Greece at the 2004 Summer Olympics in Athens, Greece in the men's trampoline event. He finished in 12th place in the qualification round.
