= Natalia Karpenkova =

Belarusian trampoline gymnast

- Full name: Nataliya Vladimirovna Karpenkova
- Born: February 1, 1970 (age 56)
- Height: 156 cm (5 ft 1 in)

Gymnastics career
- Discipline: Trampoline gymnastics
- Country represented: Belarus
Medal record
Women's trampoline gymnastics
Representing Belarus
World Championships
Silver medal – second place	1994 Portugal	Synchro
Silver medal – second place	1996 Canada	Synchro
Bronze medal – third place	1996 Canada	Team
Silver medal – second place	1998 Australia	Team
Bronze medal – third place	1999 South Africa	Team
Bronze medal – third place	2001 Denmark	Synchro
European Championships
Gold medal – first place	2000 Netherlands	Synchro
- Last updated on: 1 September 2018.

Natalia Karpenkova (born 1 February 1970) is a Belarusian trampoline gymnast. She competed in the women's trampoline event at the 2000 Summer Olympics and various Trampoline World Championships.

== Career statistics ==
=== Trampoline World Championships ===
Year	Event	Rank	Team partner(s)	Point	Ref
1994	Individual	6	N/A	36.60	
1994	Team	5	Galina Lebedeva; Ludmila Padasenko; Marina Nikitina	184.70	
1994	Synchro	2nd place, silver medalist(s)	Galina Lebedeva	46.20	
1996	Individual	6	N/A	100.9	
1996	Team	3rd place, bronze medalist(s)	Galina Lebedeva; Liudmila Padasenko; Tamara Graevskaia	105.9	
1996	Synchro	2nd place, silver medalist(s)	Galina Lebedeva	128.40	
1998	Individual	=6	N/A	99.60	
1998	Team	2nd place, silver medalist(s)	Galina Lebedeva; Liudmila Padasenko; Tatiana Petrenia	110.10	
1998	Synchro	4	Galina Lebedeva	124.50	
1999	Individual	6	N/A	103.20	
1999	Team	3rd place, bronze medalist(s)	Galina Lebedeva; Liudmila Padasenko; Tatiana Petrenia	110.30	
1999	Synchro	4	Galina Lebedeva	130.30	
2001	Team	5	Galina Lebedeva; Liudmila Padasenko; Tatiana Petrenia	113.30	
2001	Synchro	3rd place, bronze medalist(s)	Galina Lebedeva	48.10	
