= Shine (charity) =

Shine (a name derived from Spina bifida, Hydrocephalus, Information, Networking and Equality) (formerly known as ASBAH) is a UK registered charity providing information and advice about spina bifida and hydrocephalus to individuals, families and carers.

Their services are targeted towards:

- support to parents before and around the birth of their baby, or diagnosis of the disability
- support to the child and family on educational matters
- specialised information and help on health matters
- helping young people access services to progress towards control of their lives
- responding to the needs of adults with spina bifida and/or hydrocephalus.

They do this by employing a network of advisers throughout England, Wales and Northern Ireland who deliver advice, support and advocacy services. Their staff also include specialist advisers in education, health and continence management.

Shine works in partnership with a network of independent affiliated local associations to share information and promote good practice, and to deliver a range of support and specialist services.

Advisory committees for medical matters and education are composed of professionals from the relevant fields who offer guidance for ASBAH's services.

Shine's work is financed by voluntary donations, trading activities and grants from charitable and corporate trusts.

Conductor Jeffrey Tate, CBE, was ASBAH/ Shine president from 1989 until his death in 2017. In 2024, Kate Steele is the charity’s CEO.

Footballer Danny Mills has been a patron of Shine.
