= Rosebery School =

Location
- White Horse Drive; Epsom, Surrey, KT18 7NQ; England; 51.32859°N 0.27775°W

Information
- Type: Academy
- Motto: "Excellence, Endeavour, Opportunity."
- Established: 1927; 99 years ago
- Department for Education URN: 137736 Tables
- Ofsted: Reports
- Staff: Over 100
- Gender: Female
- Age: 11 to 16
- Enrolment: 1,470
- Website: roseberyschool.co.uk

Rosebery School is an all-girls school located in Epsom, Surrey. It consists of a lower school for those aged between 11 and 16, and a sixth form for those aged between 16 and 18. The school has academy status. It is situated close to the A24, and is a 10 to 20-minute walk from Epsom town centre and Epsom railway station.

== History ==
Rosebery School sits on an area of land given to the borough by Lord Rosebery, along with the nearby Rosebery Park. It is the product of the amalgamation of Rosebery Grammar School for Girls and Epsom County School for Girls. It was founded in 1927 and became an academy on 1 December 2011.

== Houses ==
At Rosebery, pupils are organised into different houses: Malala, Elizabeth, Pankhurst and Curie. When a new pupil joins she is placed in a house, remaining part of it throughout her time at the school. Pupils who already have a sister in the school join the house to which their sister already belongs. The house names changed in 2016 to that of inspirational women. They were formerly Diamond, Sapphire, Ruby and Emerald. In the 1970s they were Bruce, Drake, Faraday, Nightingale and Raleigh.

== Uniform ==
All girls in the lower school, Years 7–11, wear a uniform consisting of a kilt and navy blue jumper bearing a red primrose in recognition of the family name of Lord Rosebery. The school was opened by Lord Rosebery on his birthday and he gave permission for his name to be used for the school. Previously brown and pink were used because this was the colour of Lord Rosebery's Derby uniform colours

== Specialist status ==
In 2006, Rosebery was awarded specialist status for Mathematics and ICT.

== Notable alumni ==
=== Rosebery Grammar School for Girls ===
- Jackie Ashley, Guardian journalist and broadcaster.
- Peta Buscombe, Baroness Buscombe, Chairman of the Press Complaints Commission 2009–11 and previously Chief Executive of the Advertising Association 2007-9
- Alex Kingston, actress, ER and Doctor Who; competed in the 2025 season of Strictly Come Dancing.
- Daphne Padden (1927-2009), graphic designer.
- Nuala Scarisbrick, co-founder and National Administrator of Life.

=== Rosebery School for Girls ===
- Tanya Boniface, actress, singer, and member of The 411.
