= Kate MccGwire =

British sculptor (born 1964)

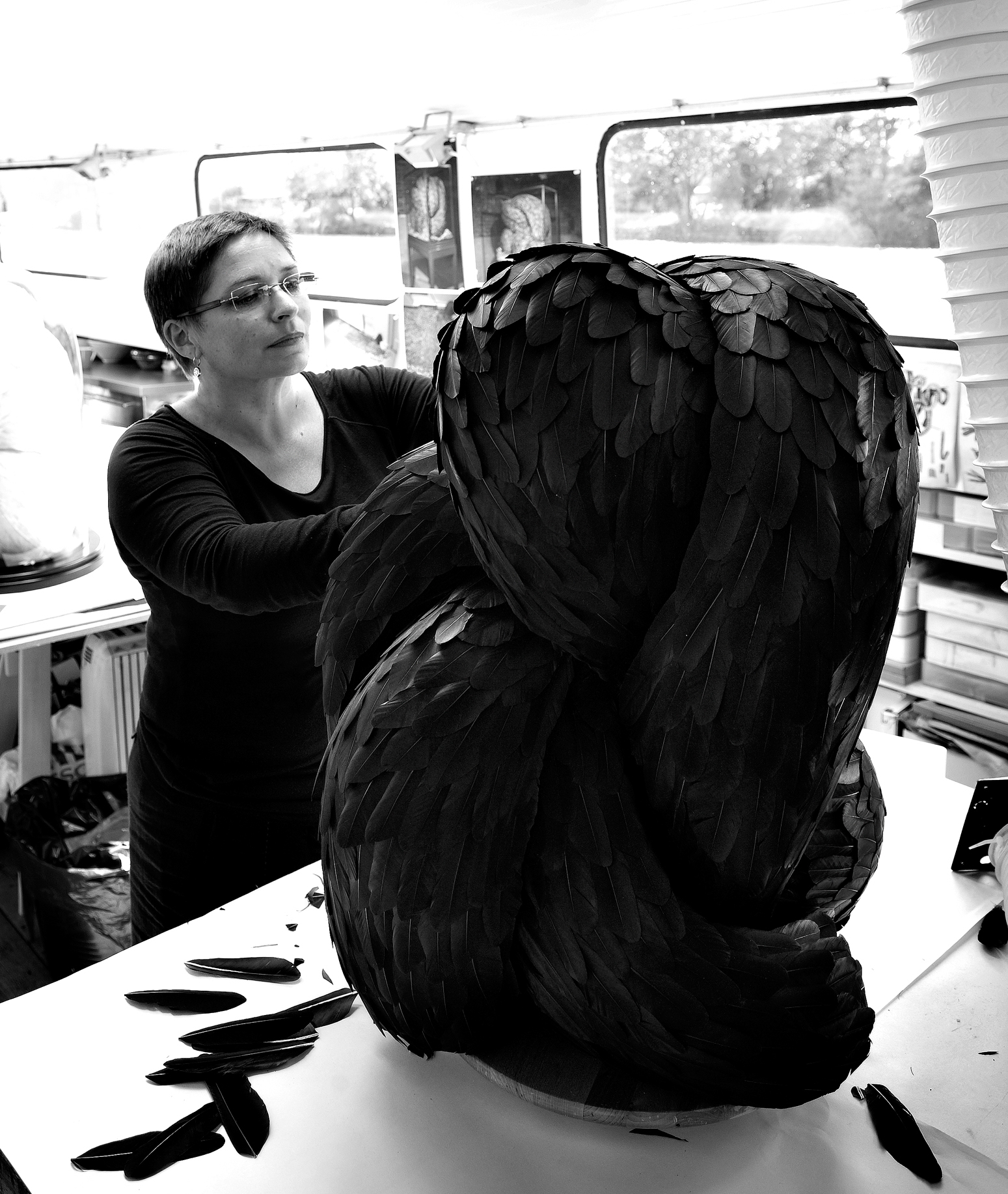
Kate MccGwire at work in her studio

Kate MccGwire (born 1964) is a British sculptor who specializes in the medium of feathers. She was born in Wroxham, Norfolk, and grew up at a boatyard. Her mother was a teacher, and her father was the managing director of a boat holiday company. She was educated at Manchester Polytechnic, Surrey Institute of Art & Design, University College and the Royal College of Art. MccGwire uses a Dutch barge moored on the Thames at Platt's Eyot, Hampton, as her studio.

MccGwire's exhibition history includes solo shows at All Visual Arts (2012) and Pertwee, Anderson and Gold (2011), as well as numerous groups shows such as at Glass tress (2015) at the Venice Biennale alongside artists such as Polly Morgan and Jake and Dinos Chapman. MccGwire's work is also collected by several notable figures in the art world including Charles Saatchi, who purchased her 2004 graduation show work constructed using 23,000 boiled chicken wishbones.

In 2025, a 25 year retrospective exhibition, named Quiver, was held at the University of Nottingham Djanogly Gallery. As well as her classic feather works her exhibition included works on paper, a bridal dress made from cable ties, and an infinity-style projection made from 3D printer cast-offs and mirrors.

== Personal life ==
Her partner is a retired engineer who now works in her studio. She has two children from a previous relationship, from which she took the MccGwire surname.
