= Ludovic Martin (gymnast) =

Swiss trampoline gymnast

- Born: 25 October 1983 (age 42)

Gymnastics career
- Discipline: Trampoline gymnastics
- Country represented: Switzerland
Medal record
Men's trampoline gymnastics
Representing Switzerland
World Championships
Silver medal – second place	2005 Eindhoven	Synchro
Bronze medal – third place	2007 Quebec	Synchro

Ludovic Martin (born 25 October 1983) is a Swiss trampoline gymnast. He represented Switzerland at the 2004 Summer Olympics in Athens, Greece in the men's trampoline event. He finished in 9th place in the qualification round.

In 2005, he won the silver medal in the men's synchro event at the Trampoline World Championships in Eindhoven, Netherlands. At the 2007 Trampoline World Championships in Quebec, Canada he won the bronze medal in this event.

He worked in accounting for some time and in September 2008 he joined Cirque du Soleil.
