= Jack Coutu =

English painter

- Born: Raymond John Coutu; 13 September 1924; Farnham, Surrey, England, UK
- Died: 17 May 2017 (aged 92); Farnham, Surrey, England, UK
- Education: Farnham School of Art; Royal College of Art
- Known for: Printmaking, sculpture, etching, engraving, carving, netsuke, watercolours

Raymond John "Jack" Coutu ARE ARCA (13 September 1924 – 17 May 2017) was an English printmaker, sculptor, etcher, engraver, carver, watercolourist and teacher. He was influenced by Oriental art.

Jack Coutu was born Raymond John Coutu at Farnham, Surrey, England, and was educated at Farnham Grammar School. On leaving school in 1940, he worked at Abbott of Farnham, a coachbuilding company in Farnham, where his father Bert Coutu was also employed painting coats of arms and heraldic shields. In 1942, at the age of 18 during World War II, he joined the Royal Corps of Signals, where after training he served in Ceylon (now Sri Lanka), India, and Singapore. At the end of WWII, he was in Kure, Japan, in the Hiroshima Prefecture.

From 1947 to 1951, Coutu studied at the Farnham School of Art, followed by the Royal College of Art in London from 1951 to 1954 and the Central School of Art from 1951 to 1955. At the Central School of Art, Merlin Evans was an influence on Coutu's printmaking.

Coutu taught printmaking at the Central School of Art from 1957 to 1965 and then at the West Surrey College of Art and Design in Farnham from 1965 to 1985. In 1968, he started to carve netsuke (as practised in Japan) and he joined the Netsuke Kenkyukai Society, based in the United States. He is also a member of the Royal Society of Painter-Etchers and Engravers and the Printmakers Council.

Jack Coutu has exhibited at the Royal Academy in London, netsuke conventions, jointly with Michael Rothenstein at the Alecto Gallery in 1965, and at the Graphic Arts Gallery in 1968. His work is in the permanent collections of the Arts Council of Great Britain, Cartwright Hall art gallery in Bradford, King Gustave of Sweden, the Museum of Fine Arts in Boston, Massachusetts, and the Victoria and Albert Museum in London.

Coutu never married and lived with his sister, Peggy, who died ten days after him. They are both buried next to their parents in Farnham.
