= Daphne Padden =

English graphic designer (1927–2009)

- Born: 21 May 1927
- Died: 21 September 2009 (aged 82)
- Alma mater: Rosebery School for Girls; Surrey Institute of Art & Design
- Occupation: Graphic designer, watercolorist
- Parent(s): Percy Padden

Daphne Padden (1927–2009) was an English graphic designer.

Padden was born on 21 May 1927, in London, the daughter of Percy Padden (1886–1965), himself an artist and poster designer.

She was educated at Rosebery County School and at Epsom & Ewell School of Art, obtaining the National Diploma in Design for painting.

She designed posters and other material for clients including travel companies (not least P&O Orient Lines and British European Airways), the British Transport Commission, the Royal Society for the Prevention of Accidents, the British Diabetic Society, Trust House Forte, the United Kingdom General Post Office (including, in 1966, a card sent in reply to children who had written to Father Christmas) and the Post Office Savings Bank. She also designed product packaging for Marks & Spencer, Unilever and Pall Mall cigarettes, and postage stamps including a 1977 set for the post office of Jamaica as well as various designs for the Pitcairn Islands, Saint Lucia and Saint Vincent.

She was also a watercolourist, holding her first exhibition in that genre at Bourne Hall Museum Gallery, Ewell, in 1976. She painted countryside and wildlife, especially birds, in miniature. She became a member of the Royal Society of Miniature Painters, Sculptors and Gravers in 1984, having been an associate since 1981.

Padden died on 21 September 2009. Copies of her works are in several collections, including the UK's Royal Archives, The Postal Museum, London, the Science Museum Group and National Museum Wales.
