= Jaime Halsey =

British trampoline gymnast

- Born: 16 August 1979 (age 47) Northampton, England

Jaime Halsey (née Moore; born 16 August 1979) is a British former Olympic trampolinist. She represented her nation at the 2000 Summer Olympics, the first time the event was recognised by the competition. After a twenty-year career, Moore retired from gymnastics in January 2010 to focus on coaching.

== Biography ==
Northampton-born Moore started out, at the age of five, as a gymnast, and five years later she took up trampolining after discovering beach trampolines in Great Yarmouth, where her parents used to take her on holiday. She was spotted by Tracy Whittaker-Smith, the coach of Northamptonshire Trampoline Gymnastics Academy. Moore joined the Academy, and Whittaker-Smith went on to be her coach for her entire career.

It was not long until Moore entered her first competition, which she won.

Moore came to prominence in 1994, aged 14, by winning the synchronised competition at the World Age Games and finishing second at the European Youth Championships. Two years later, she won the individual and team events.

In 1999, she became British champion and finished ninth at the World Championships in South Africa. It won her country the first place at the 2000 Summer Olympics in Sydney. In Australia, she finished twelfth. Injuries prevented her from appearing at the 2004 Games in Athens.

In July 2005 Moore won her sixth national title, but her first since coming out of retirement.

Also in 2005, reacting to the news that London had won the bid to host the 2012 Summer Olympics, Moore said: "It's going to be really brilliant. The Olympics is the most amazing experience an athlete can have. To be part of it, especially in your home country, has got to be just incredible."

On 25 November 2005, Moore and Claire Wright won the British Championship title in synchronised trampolining.

In 2006, she missed out on obtaining the British senior title by just a tenth of a point to compatriot Claire Wright. She did, however, break her own record for difficulty, with a 13.1 total.

Also in 2006, Moore attended the eighth FIG Trampoline and Tumbling World Cup final, which was held in Birmingham.

After winning Britain's place at the Beijing Olympics, Moore finished below Claire Wright in the European Championships and travelled to China as the reserve.

Moore continued to partake in top-level competitions, including finals at the British and European Championships, until 2008. Her final competition was the 2009 World Championships in Russia.

=== Retirement ===
Two years before the 2012 Summer Olympics in London, a 30-year-old Moore announced her retirement from gymnastics in order to concentrate on coaching.

=== Media work ===
In the early 1990s, Moore appeared in an episode of the British game show You Bet! in which the celebrity contestants had to predict whether or not the gymnast could perform a certain number of somersaults in an allotted timeframe.

In November 2000, Moore appeared on BBC One comedy sports quiz They Think It's All Over as a mystery guest in the Feel the Sportsman round.

== Personal life ==
Moore married Steve Halsey in 2009. They have four daughters: Flo (born 2012) and triplets Eden, Amber and Erin (born 2015).
