= The Periodic Table (Basher book) =

2007 book by Simon Basher and Adrian Dingle

The Periodic Table: Elements with Style
- Author: Adrian Dingle
- Illustrator: Simon Basher
- Cover artist: Simon Basher
- Language: English
- Series: Simon Basher Science
- Subject: Periodic table
- Genre: Non-fiction
- Publisher: Kingfisher Publications (UK); Macmillan (US)
- Publication date: May 23, 2007
- Publication place: United Kingdom
- Media type: Print (Paperback)
- Pages: 128 pages
- ISBN: 0-7534-6085-8
- Followed by: Physics: Why Matter Matters!

The Periodic Table: Elements with Style is a 2007 children's science book created by Simon Basher and written by Adrian Dingle. It is the second book in Basher's science series, after Rocks and Minerals: A Gem of a Book. Some of the Basher Science books includes Physics: Why Matter Matters!, Biology: Life As We Know It, Astronomy: Out of this World!, Rocks and Minerals: A Gem of a Book, and Planet Earth: What Planet Are You On?, each of which is 128 pages long.

The book is arranged in eleven chapters plus an introduction, and includes a poster in the back of the book. Each chapter is on a different group of the periodic table (hydrogen, the alkali metals, the alkaline earth metals, the transition metals, the boron elements, the carbon elements, the nitrogen elements, the oxygen elements, the halogen elements, the noble gases, the lanthanides and actinides, and the transactinides). For every type of then known atom, Basher has created a "manga-esque" cartoon, and for many types of atoms, Dingle, a high-school chemistry teacher who also developed an award-winning chemistry website has written a couple paragraphs of facts to go with the cartoon. Dingle, who says that "science is a serious business", wanted in writing the book "to get people engaged is to make it accessible while still presenting hard facts and knowledge," while Basher was concerned that the book's design be "sharp and focused" in order to "connect with today's visually advanced young audience."

== Critical response ==
Publishers Weekly said that the book was a "lively introduction to the chart that has been the bane of many a chemistry student", and in a review in New Scientist, Vivienne Greig called The Periodic Table "an engrossing read and an ideal way to painlessly impart a great deal of science history to seen-it-all-before teenagers." A review on the Royal Society of Chemistry website had some minor reservations about the book, but said it was "endearing" and succeeded in making learning chemistry easier and more fun.

The Periodic Table: Elements with Style has also been reviewed in the Bulletin of the Center for Children's Books and the Journal of Chemical Education.
