= Akiko Furu =

Japanese trampoline gymnast

- Born: 18 July 1973 (age 53)

Gymnastics career
- Discipline: Trampoline gymnastics
- Country represented: Japan

Akiko Furu (古章子, Furu Akiko; born 18 July 1973) is a Japanese trampoline gymnast. She competed in the women's trampoline event at the 2000 Summer Olympics held in Sydney, Australia. She finished in 6th place.

In 2001, she competed in the women's synchronized trampoline event at the 2001 World Games held in Akita, Japan.
