= Ben Wilden =

Australian trampoline gymnast

- Born: 24 April 1985 (age 41) Murray Bridge, South Australia
- Height: 1.70 m (5 ft 7 in)

Gymnastics career
- Discipline: Trampoline gymnastics
- Country represented: Australia
- Head coach: Nikolay Zhuravlev
Medal record
Men's trampoline gymnastics
Representing Australia
World Championships
Silver medal – second place	2007 Quebec	Synchro

Ben Wilden (born 24 April 1985 in Murray Bridge, South Australia) is an Australian trampoline gymnast. He is a former national champion in trampoline sports and represented Australia at the 2008 Summer Olympics in Beijing as the country's sole representative in trampolining.

== Personal life ==
Wilden completed his schooling at Murray Bridge High School and Hamilton Secondary College in South Australia. He first started trampolining in his backyard 1994, and only a year later competed at the National Championships in trampoline sports, finishing with second place.

== Competition ==
Wilden has won a number of junior and senior titles in trampoline and has competed at both an Australian national and international level.

=== Youth Olympic Festivals ===
In 2001, Wilden competed at the inaugural Australian Youth Olympic Festival, receiving silver in the synchronised trampoline event. He followed this achievement by winning gold in the same event at the Australian Youth Olympics in 2003. Wilden openly credits this as one of the highlights of his trampolining career because he hyperextended his knee the week prior to the competition, but was still successful in his pursuit for gold.

=== 2008 Beijing Olympics ===
In 2007, Wilden was selected as a wildcard to represent Australia in the 2008 Beijing Olympics as the country's sole representative in trampolining. His Games entry was gained on the back of his performance at the previous years' World Trampoline Championships in Stuttgart, Germany in which Wilden was the highest-placed Oceania performer of the Championships.

Wilden narrowly missed the Olympic final, receiving total score of 67.10 to finish 13th overall.
