= Chen Yang (gymnast) =

Chinese trampoline gymnast (born 1987)

- Born: December 26, 1987 (age 38)

Gymnastics career
- Discipline: Trampoline gymnastics
- Country represented: China
Medal record
Men's trampoline gymnastics
Representing China
World Championships
Silver medal – second place	2005 Eindhoven	Tumbling

Chen Yang (Chinese: 陈杨, born 26 December 1987) is a Chinese gymnast who represented China at the 2005 Trampoline World Championships.
