= Chen Yang (TV host) =

Chinese TV and radio personality

Chen Yang (Chinese: 陈扬; pinyin: chén yáng; Jyutping: can^{4} joeng^{4}; Cantonese Yale: Chàhn Yèuhng) is a Chinese TV and radio personality, born in Guangzhou on 30 July 1954.

He had worked for Radio Guangdong, Radio Foshan, Guangdong TV, HKSTV and the Guangzhou Broadcasting Network, and had a column in Southern Metropolis Daily and Yangcheng Evening News. However, since his contract with HKSTV expired August 2012, his TV show was handed over to other hosts. He also was one of the torchbearers of the 2008 Summer Olympics torch relay in Guangzhou.
