= Natalia Chernova =

Russian trampoline gymnast

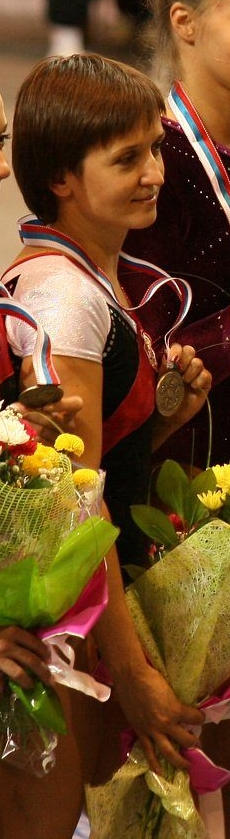

Medal record

Women's trampoline gymnastics

Representing Russia

World Championships
Silver medal – second place	2005 Eindhoven	Individual

European Championships
Gold medal – first place	2002 St Petersburg	Individual

Natalia Aleksandrovna Chernova (Russian: Наталья Александровна Чернова; born March 6, 1976, in Krasnodar, Russia) is a Russian Olympic trampoline gymnast. She has been competing in international competitions since 1994. In this period she has been to 2 Olympics, 7 World Championships and 7 European Championships.

== Record ==
Below is her competition record:

Olympics

- Athens 2004 = 4th
- Beijing 2008 = 11th

World Championships

- 2007 Quebec City World Championships = 7th
- 2005 Eindhoven World Championships = 2nd
- 2003 Hannover World Championships = 4th
- 2001 Odense World Championships = 47th
- 1999 Sun City World Championships = 5th
- 1998 Sydney World Championships = 10th
- 1994 Porto World Championships = 54th

European Championships

- 2008 Odense European Championships = 6th
- 2006 Metz European Championships = 5th
- 2004 Sofia European Championships = 9th
- 2002 St Petersburg European Championships = 1st
- 2000 Eindhoven European Championships = 5th
- 1998 Dessau European Championships = 34th
- 1995 Antibes European Championships = 13th

In addition she is the 4-time Russian Champion taking the title in 1998, 1999, 2000 and 2007. Chernova is 5 ft 2in (158 cm) and currently lives in Krasnodar with her husband German Khnychev who is a one time World and two time European champion himself at trampolining. They have one child together.
