= Susannah Johnson =

American trampoline gymnast

- Born: September 30, 1990 (age 35)

Gymnastics career
- Discipline: Trampoline gymnastics
- Country represented: United States

Susannah Johnson (born September 30, 1990) is an American gymnast. She was a senior-level gymnast for the United States Gymnastics national team. Johnson retired in November 2009 after the Trampoline and Tumbling World Championships and is now a trampoline instructor.

Johnson is originally from Roanoke, Virginia.
