= Katka Prokešová =

Slovak trampoline gymnast

Katarína Prokešová
- Born: 1 February 1976 (age 50) Bratislava, Slovakia
- Height: 169 cm (5 ft 7 in)

Gymnastics career
- Discipline: Trampoline gymnastics
- Country represented: Slovakia; (2000-2011 (?))
- Club: TJ Slavia UK/TGJ Salzgitter, GER

Katarína "Katka" Prokešová (born 1 February 1976 in Bratislava) is a Slovak former individual and double-mini trampolinist, representing her nation at international competitions.

She participated in the 2004 Summer Olympics, finishing 10th in the women's trampoline event. At the 2000 European Trampoline Championships she won the gold medal in the individual double-mini event. She competed at world championships, including at the 2001, 2005 and 2011 Trampoline World Championships, winning the bronze medal in the individual double-mini event in 2001.
