= South Farnham School =

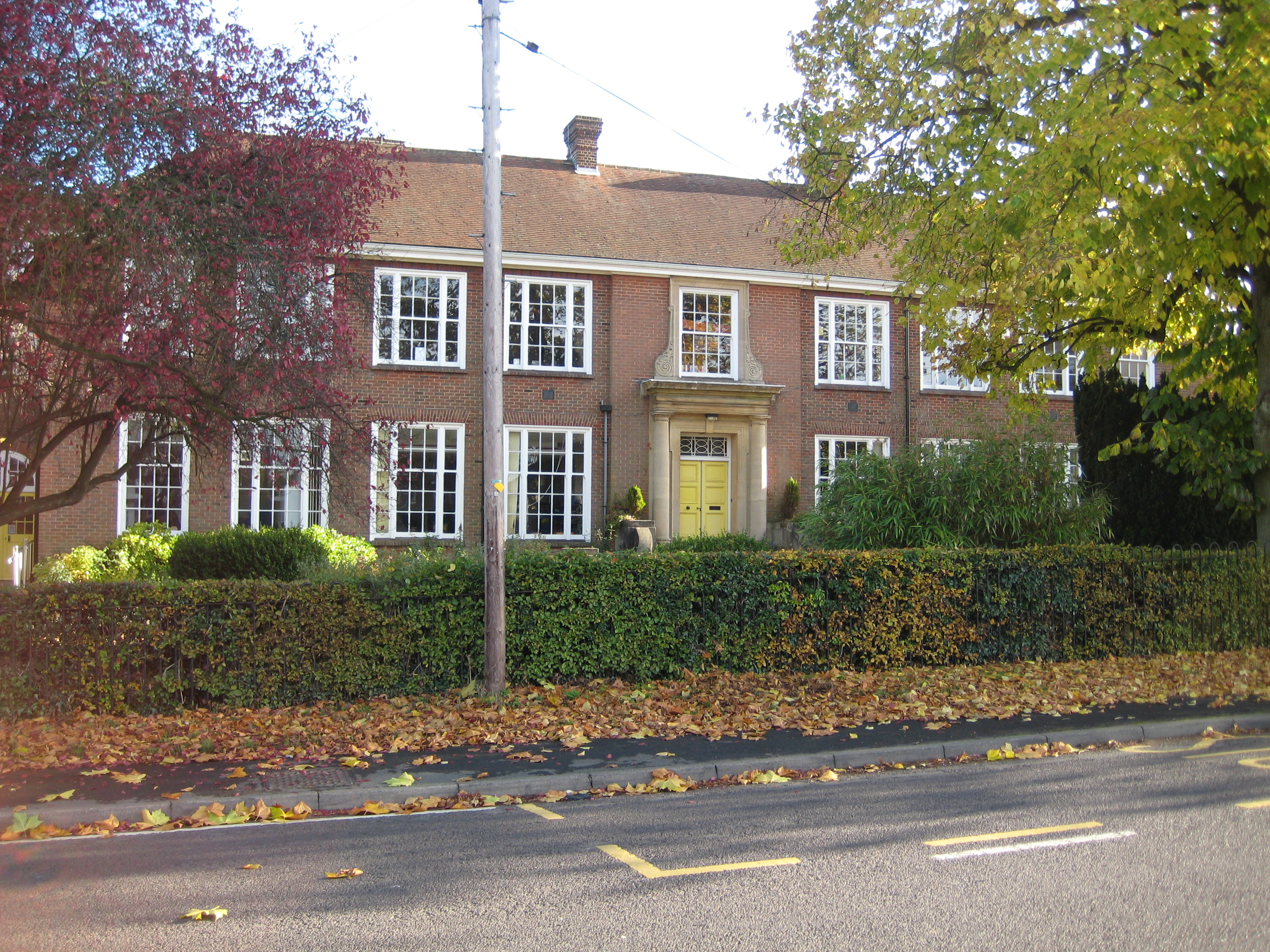

Location
- Menin Way (Junior Site); School Lane (Infant Site); Farnham, Surrey, GU9 8DY; England; 51°12′36″N 0°47′10″W

Information
- Type: Academy
- Established: 2011
- Local authority: Surrey
- Department for Education URN: 136888 Tables
- Ofsted: Reports
- Headteacher: Esther Franks
- Gender: Mixed
- Age: 4 to 11
- Enrolment: 846
- Website: www.south-farnham.surrey.sch.uk

South Farnham School is a coeducational academy in Farnham, Surrey, England. It is on two separate sites, with the infants' section for children aged 4–7 at the Bourne site (formerly the Bourne Infants School) in the Lower Bourne, and the junior section for children aged 7–11 at the main school site at Menin Way.

== History ==
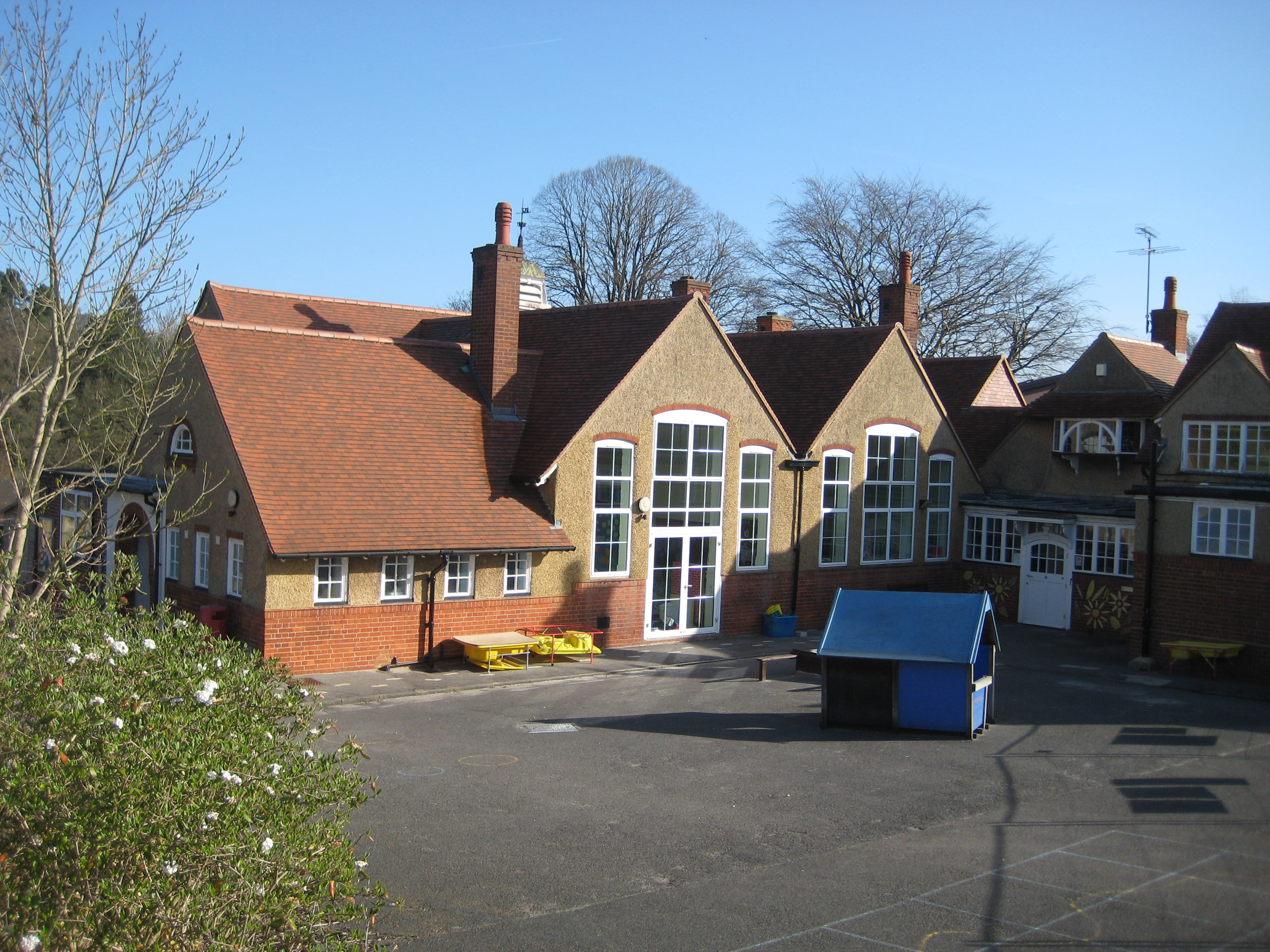
The Bourne site (formerly the Bourne School)

The school was originally built in 1938 as the Farnham Girls' Grammar School', which was opened by Princess Alice, Duchess of Gloucester in 1939 and closed in 1973.

In 2011 the Bourne Infants School merged with South Farnham School, and teaching now takes place on two sites. Reception through Year 2 (ages 4–7) are taught at the Bourne site, and Years 3–6 (ages 7–11) are taught at the Menin Way site.

== Academic performance and inspections ==
The school was judged Outstanding by Ofsted in 2012 and at the next inspection in 2024.

In 2024, the school was listed as the best primary school in England by The Schools Index.

The school is a teaching school, taking the project lead role in the Surrey South Farnham School Centred Teacher Training project.

== Facilities ==
The accommodation at South Farnham School includes seven libraries, a music suite and four practical rooms. There is an assembly hall, two studios, gymnasium, cloakrooms and changing rooms. The 7 acres (28,000 m^{2}) of play area include three astroturf courts, grassed sports fields and pavilion.

== Notable pupils ==
=== Farnham Girls' Grammar School ===
- Liza Goddard, actress

=== South Farnham Primary School ===
- Rachel Morris, paralympic handcyclist
