= Surrey Institute of Art & Design, University College =

Former art school in England

Coordinates: 51.216°N 0.806°W

Surrey Institute of Art & Design, University College (SIAD) was an art college in the United Kingdom from 1994 to 2005. It was formed from the merger of West Surrey College of Art and Design (1969–1995) and Epsom School of Art and Design (1893–1995). It merged with the Kent Institute of Art & Design on 1 August 2005 to form the University College for the Creative Arts at Canterbury, Epsom, Farnham and Rochester, now the University for the Creative Arts.

== Evolution ==
The Farnham School of Art was founded in 1866. The Guildford School of Art followed in 1870. The two conjoined to become the West Surrey College of Art and Design in 1969. Epsom School of Art and Design was founded in 1893 as Epsom and Ewell Technical Institute and School of Art which later split into a separate Technical Institute and art school sometime before World War II. A new purpose built site was opened in Heathcote Road on Thursday 26 April 1973.

In 1994 there was a merger between and the West Surrey College of Art and Design and Epsom School of Art and Design, with the combined institution renamed the Surrey Institute of Art & Design a year later. These two former colleges formed the basis for the two main campuses of the school. In 1999, the college was granted university college status and took on its last name.

Until its 2005 merger it was the second largest specialist art and design institution in the country with the largest being the University of the Arts, London. A 3,500 yearly student intake was reached during its final years. As with that institution and the more restricted, typically established professional intake to the Royal College of Art, Surrey Institute gained degree-awarding powers independent of a university. As such it was degree validating partner to The Arts Institute at Bournemouth.

UCA has now sold the Maidstone campus at Oakwood Park to MidKent college and has completely withdrawn from the location. However the University still also either validates or provides courses at Maidstone Studios (TV production) and the Royal School of Needlework at Hampton Court Palace.

== Notable alumni ==
- Pamela Ascherson, sculptor and illustrator
- Piers Baker, cartoon illustrator and creator of the comic strip Ollie and Quentin
- Jason Barker, Professor of Cultural Studies Kyung Hee University and film director
- Linda Barker, television presenter
- Simon Basher, artist, illustrator and author
- Owen Bell, illustrator
- William Henry David Birch, artist, illustrator and principal of Epsom and Ewell School of Art between 1930 and 1961
- Stacy Bragger, Falkland Islands politician
- Simon Bor, Sara Bor (née Hirst) animation directors & producers
- Cecily Brown, painter
- Geoffrey Burnand, painter
- Davide Cinzi, cinematographer
- Jack Coutu, printmaker and sculptor
- Sue Darlow, documentary photographer and cycle adventurer
- Michaël Dudok de Wit, animator
- Gareth Edwards, film director (Godzilla, 2014)
- Malika Favre (b. 1982, French illustrator)
- Anna Fox, documentary photographer
- Neil Haddon, painter
- David Hulin, animator and director
- Annabel Jankel, animator and film director
- Kathi Käppel, illustrator and animation director
- Kate MccGwire, sculptor, specializing in the medium of feathers
- Dominic Mitchell, screenwriter/playwright (In The Flesh, 2013-14)
- John Mollo, film costume designer (Star Wars, 1977)
- Morten Mørland, political cartoonist
- Rocky Morton, animator and film director
- Gwen Mullins (1904-1997) weaver
- Lance Nielsen, writer and director, film and theatre
- Magdalene Odundo, potter
- Mrinalini Mukherjee, sculptor
- Cyriak Harris, animator
- Omeima Mudawi-Rowlings, British-Sudanese textile artist
- Grant Orchard, animator and director
- Daphne Padden (1927-2009), graphic designer
- Jimmy Page, musician and producer, founder of Led Zeppelin
- Nigel Rolfe, performance artist
- Chris Shepherd, animator and director
- Suzie Templeton, animator and director
- Alan Thornhill, sculptor and former potter
- Darren Walsh, animator and director
- Mary Wondrausch, artist, potter and writer
