= Jennifer Parilla =

American trampoline gymnast

- Born: January 9, 1981 (age 45) Newport Beach, California, U.S.
- Height: 5 ft 2 in (157 cm)

Gymnastics career
- Discipline: Trampoline gymnastics
- Country represented: United States
- Club: Team Everybody

Jennifer Parilla (born January 9, 1981) is an American trampolinist who was born in Newport Beach, California. She was the first and only American to qualify to the 2000 Summer Olympics in Sydney as a trampolinist when the sport debuted; and finished in 9th place. She competed for the US at the 2004 Athens Summer Olympics.

She was on the national team for eleven years from 1993 to 2004; her favorite event was trampoline but she also competed successfully on the double mini. She was the National Champion in 1998, 2000, 2002, 2003, and 2004 on the trampoline, and on the double mini in 1998 and 1999. She earned national titles in 1993, 1994, 1995, 1996, and 1998 in synchronized trampoline, bringing her total national title count to twelve.

She was inducted into the USA Gymnastics Hall of Fame in 2010.

== Personal life ==
Jennifer's hometown is Lake Forest, California but she now resides in Newport Beach. She trained with Team Everybody gymnastics club and was coached by Lionel Rangel. Jennifer attended Orange Coast College and California State Polytechnic University in Pomona.

Jennifer is one of two children to Paul and Jan Parilla; she has an older brother named Steve. She is currently the Trampoline and Tumbling Director at National Gymnastics Training Center in Aliso Viejo, California.

== International competition ==
- 2003 World Championships, Hannover, GER; 16th-Trampoline
- 2003 World Cup, Prague, CZE; 4th-Trampoline
- 2003 World Cup, Ostend, BEL; 18th-Trampoline
- 2003 Canada Cup, Oakville, O.N., CAN; 8th-Trampoline
- 2002 World Cup, Mykolayiv, UKR; 11th – Trampoline
- 2001 World Championships, Odense, DEN; 19th – Trampoline
- 2000 Summer Olympics, Sydney, AUS; 9th-Trampoline
- 2000 World Cup, Sydney, AUS; 6th – Trampoline (4th vs. Olympic Field)
- 2000 Olympic Test Event, Sydney, AUS; 6th – Trampoline (4th vs. Olympic Field)
- 1999 Olympic Selection; 9th – Trampoline
- 1999 World Championships, Sun City, RSA; 7th – Synchro, 17th – Trampoline
- 1999 French Nationals, Toulouse, FRA; 1st – Synchro
- 1998 World Championships, Sydney, AUS; 2nd – Double Mini, 3rd – Team Double Mini
- 1997 Trampoline World cup final, Frankfurt, GER; 5th – Trampoline
- 1997 Indo-Pacific Championships, Durban, RSA; 3rd – Double mini
- 1997 Trampoline World Cup Final, Sydney, AUS; 4th – Trampoline
- 1996 Trampoline World Cup, Frankfurt, GER; 2nd Trampoline
- 1996 World Championships, Vancouver, CAN; 6th – Synchro, 7th – Trampoline
- 1995 Trampoline World Cup, Vancouver, CAN; 7th – Trampoline
- 1994 World Championships, Porto, POR; 1st – Team Double Mini
- 1994 World Age Group Games, Vila De Conde, POR; 1st - Trampoline 2nd – Double Mini

== National Competition ==
- 2004 U.S. Olympic Team Trials, San Jose, Calif.; 1st - Trampoline
- 2004 Visa U.S. Championships, Nashville, Tenn.; 1st - Trampoline
- 2003 U.S. Championships, Sacramento, Calif.; 1st – Trampoline
- 2003 Winter Classic, Tampa, Fla.; 2nd - Trampoline
- 2002 National Championships, Cleveland, Ohio; 1st – Trampoline
- 2002 U.S. Elite Challenge, Indianapolis, Ind.; 1st – Trampoline
- 2002 Winter Classic, Indianapolis, Ind.; 4th – Trampoline
- 2001 National Championships, San Antonio, Texas; 11th - Trampoline
- 2000 National Championships, St. Louis, Mo.; 1st – Trampoline
- 1999 U.S. World Team Trials, Sacramento, Calif.; 1st – Trampoline, 1st – Synchro - 2nd Double Mini
- 1999 U.S. World Team Trials, Knoxville, Tenn.; 1st – trampoline, 1st – Double Mini, 1st - Synchro
- 1999 National Championships, Anaheim, Calif.; 1st – Double Mini
- 1998 National Championships, St. Paul, Minn.; 1st – Trampoline, 1st – Synchro, 1st – Double Mini
- 1996 National Championships, Phoenix Ariz.; 1st – Synchro, 3rd – Trampoline
- 1995 National Championships, Denver, Colo.; 1st – Synchro, 2nd – Trampoline, 3rd – Double Mini
- 1994 National Championships, Nashville, Tenn.; 1st - Synchro, 4th – Double Mini
- 1993 National Championships; San Diego, Calif.; 1st - Synchro
