= Kirsten Lawton =

British trampoline gymnast

- Born: 17 November 1980 (age 45) Hemel Hempstead
- Height: 162 cm (5 ft 4 in)

Gymnastics career
- Discipline: Trampoline gymnastics
- Country represented: Great Britain
- Club: Edgbarrow Trampolining Club
- Head coach: Sue Lawton
Medal record
Women's trampoline gymnastics
Representing Great Britain
World Championships
Bronze medal – third place	2001 Odense	Team
World Games
Silver medal – second place	2001 Akita	Synchro (with Claire Wright)

Kirsten Lawton (born 17 November 1980 in Hemel Hempstead, England) is a British trampoline gymnast who represented Great Britain at the 2004 Summer Olympics.
