= David Martin (gymnast) =

French gymnast (born 1977)

- Full name: David Martin
- Born: 8 June 1977 (age 49) Thiais, France

Gymnastics career
- Country represented: France

David Martin (born 8 June 1977), is a French former trampoline gymnast. He had competed for France at the 2000 and 2004 Summer Olympics.

== Biography ==
David Martin was born in Thiais, France on 8 June 1977. During the 2000 Summer Olympics in Sydney, he became the first French to have taken part in the Olympic Games. He finished fourth in individual, in 2000. He finished 8th at the 2004 Summer Olympics in Athens. He has to date one of the biggest achievements in the discipline. In addition to his individual performances, associated with Emmanuel Durand or Cornu, Martin was claimed to be of the best "synchro" pairs in the world.
