= Claire Wright (gymnast) =

British trampoline gymnast

- Full name: Claire Louise Wright
- Born: 5 August 1979 (age 47) Camberley
- Height: 167 cm (5 ft 6 in)

Gymnastics career
- Discipline: Trampoline gymnastics
- Country represented: Great Britain
- Club: OLGA
- Head coach: Nigel Rendell
- Assistant coach: Sharon Wood
Medal record
Women's trampoline gymnastics
Representing Great Britain
World Championships
Bronze medal – third place	2001 Odense	Individual
Bronze medal – third place	2001 Odense	Team
World Cup
Gold medal – first place	2001 Hannover	Synchro (with Kirsten Lawton)
Bronze medal – third place	2006 Birmingham	Individual
World Games
Silver medal – second place	2001 Akita	Synchro (with Kirstin Lawton)

Claire Louise Wright (born 5 August 1979 in Camberley, England) is a British trampoline gymnast. Her parents, Bernie and Colin Wright are gymnastics coaches and they run the Rushmoor Gymnastics Academy. She attended sixth form at Farnham College before doing a Sports Science degree at University of Wales Institute, Cardiff. The couple introduced Wright to gymnastics at an early age.

Wright received FIG pin for achievement at World Championships in 2000.

Wright retired after representing Great Britain at the 2008 Summer Olympics

Claire is currently performing in Cirque du Soleil's La Nouba, in the trampolining and track act.

== Titles ==
- British Champion 2001, 2002, 2003, 2004, 2005
- World Championships 2001, bronze medallist team and individual.
- Nine times World Cup Synchro Champion.
- World Cup Final 1st 2002. Synchro
- World Cup individual Champion 2002, Canada.
- World Cup Individual Champion 2004, Moscow
- World Cup Individual Champion 2005, Sofia
