= Gymnastics at the 2001 Goodwill Games =

- Location: Brisbane, Queensland, Australia

At the 2001 Goodwill Games, three different gymnastics disciplines were contested: artistic gymnastics, rhythmic gymnastics and trampolining.

== Artistic Gymnastics ==
=== Medalists ===
Event	Gold	Silver	Bronze
Men
Individual all-around	(Romania) Marian Drăgulescu	(China) Huang Xu	(Belarus) Ivan Ivankov
Floor	(Bulgaria) Yordan Yovchev	(Romania) Marian Drăgulescu	(Russia) Alexei Bondarenko
Pommel horse	(Romania) Marius Urzica	(China) Huang Xu	(United States) Brett McClure
Rings	(Hungary) Szilveszter Csollany	(Belarus) Ivan Ivankov	(Bulgaria) Yordan Yovchev
Vault	(China) Lu Bin	(Poland) Leszek Blanik	(Romania) Marian Drăgulescu
Parallel bars	(China) Huang Xu	(Russia) Nikolai Kryukov	(Belarus) Ivan Ivankov
High bar	(Australia) Philippe Rizzo	(Russia) Nikolai Kryukov	(China) Huang Xu
Women
Individual all-around	(Romania) Sabina Cojocar	(Russia) Svetlana Khorkina	(Russia) Elena Zamolodchikova
Vault	(Russia) Elena Zamolodchikova	(Uzbekistan) Oksana Chusovitina	(Ukraine) Alona Kvasha
Uneven bars	(Russia) Svetlana Khorkina	(Russia) Natalia Ziganshina	(United States) Hollie Vise
Balance beam	(China) Sun Xiaojiao	(Russia) Anna Pavlova	(United States) Hollie Vise
Floor	(Russia) Elena Zamolodchikova	(Russia) Svetlana Khorkina	(Romania) Sabina Cojocar

== Rhythmic Gymnastics ==
=== Medalists ===
Event	Gold	Silver	Bronze
Individual
All-Around	Irina Tchachina (RUS)	Alina Kabaeva (RUS)	Simona Peycheva (BUL)
Rope	Alina Kabaeva (RUS)	Irina Tchachina (RUS)	Simona Peycheva (BUL)
Hoop	Irina Tchachina (RUS)	Alina Kabaeva (RUS)	Simona Peycheva (BUL)
Ball	Alina Kabaeva (RUS)	Irina Tchachina (RUS)	Simona Peycheva (BUL)
Clubs	Alina Kabaeva (RUS)	Irina Tchachina (RUS)	Anna Bessonova (UKR)

== Trampolining ==
=== Medalists ===
Games	Gold	Silver	Bronze
Men's individual	Alexander Moskalenko; Russia	Olexander Chernonos; Ukraine	Dimitri Polyarush; Belarus
Women's individual	Anna Dogonadze; Germany	Irina Karavayeva; Russia	Oxana Tsyhuleva; Ukraine

== Details ==
=== Artistic Gymnastics ===
==== Men ====
===== Individual All-Around =====
Rank	Gymnast	Floor (gymnastics)	Pommel horse	Rings (gymnastics)	Vault (gymnastics)	Parallel bars	Horizontal bar	Total
1st place, gold medalist(s)	Marian Drăgulescu (ROU)	9.312	9.512	9.125	9.750	8.962	9.387	56.048
2nd place, silver medalist(s)	Huang Xu (CHN)	8.375	9.450	9.712	9.225	9.537	9.700	55.999
3rd place, bronze medalist(s)	Ivan Ivankov (BLR)	8.887	9.587	9.687	9.375	8.887	9.525	55.948
4	Yordan Yovchev (BUL)	9.400	8.987	9.775	9.375	9.075	9.187	55.799
5	Nikolai Kryukov (RUS)	8.200	9.687	9.275	9.200	9.287	9.637	55.286
6	Brett McClure (USA)	8.700	9.512	8.725	9.325	9.175	9.612	55.049
7	Alexei Bondarenko (RUS)	8.700	8.575	9.300	9.575	9.212	9.662	55.024
8	Sean Townsend (USA)	8.137	8.825	9.487	9.050	9.475	9.600	54.574
9	Philippe Rizzo (AUS)	8.812	8.925	8.512	9.300	8.600	9.675	53.824
10	Stephen McCain (USA)	8.662	8.475	9.012	9.337	8.737	9.012	53.235
11	Alexander Svetlichnyi (UKR)	8.700	9.175	8.937	9.000	8.712	8.587	53.111
12	Damian Istria (AUS)	7.400	8.000	9.350	9.412	8.162	8.837	51.161

===== Floor =====
Rank	Gymnast	Score
1st place, gold medalist(s)	Yordan Yovchev (BUL)	9.375
2nd place, silver medalist(s)	Marian Drăgulescu (ROU)	9.312
3rd place, bronze medalist(s)	Alexei Bondarenko (RUS)	9.237
4	Yu Yanan (CHN)	9.125
5	Alexei Nemov (RUS)	8.975
6	Igors Vihrovs (LAT)	8.962
7	Oleksandr Beresch (UKR)	8.512
8	Brett McClure (USA)	8.500

===== Pommel Horse =====
Rank	Gymnast	Score
1st place, gold medalist(s)	Marius Urzica (ROU)	9.762
2nd place, silver medalist(s)	Huang Xu (CHN)	9.412
3rd place, bronze medalist(s)	Brett McClure (USA)	9.362
4	Nikolai Kryukov (RUS)	9.025
5	Yordan Yovchev (BUL)	8.925
6	Philippe Rizzo (AUS)	8.712
7	Oleksandr Beresch (UKR)	8.687
8	Alexei Bondarenko (RUS)	7.850

===== Rings =====
Rank	Gymnast	Score
1st place, gold medalist(s)	Szilveszter Csollany (HUN)	9.775
2nd place, silver medalist(s)	Ivan Ivankov (BLR)	9.700
3rd place, bronze medalist(s)	Yordan Yovchev (BUL)	9.687
4	Xie Jianhui (CHN)	9.625
5	Damian Istria (AUS)	9.362
6	Jason Furr (USA)	9.337
7	Alexei Bondarenko (RUS)	9.137
8	Marian Drăgulescu (ROU)	8.600

===== Vault =====
Rank	Gymnast	Score
1st place, gold medalist(s)	Lu Bin (CHN)	9.556
2nd place, silver medalist(s)	Leszek Blanik (POL)	9.525
3rd place, bronze medalist(s)	Marian Drăgulescu (ROU)	9.387
4	Nikolai Kryukov (RUS)	9.381
5	Oleksandr Svitlychniy (UKR)	9.287
6	Alexei Bondarenko (RUS)	9.256
7	Jason Furr (USA)	8.575
8	Damian Istria (AUS)	4.693

===== Parallel Bars =====
Rank	Gymnast	Score
1st place, gold medalist(s)	Huang Xu (CHN)	9.675
2nd place, silver medalist(s)	Nikolai Kryukov (RUS)	9.450
3rd place, bronze medalist(s)	Ivan Ivankov (BLR)	9.187
4	Alexei Bondarenko (RUS)	8.962
5	Marius Urzica (ROU)	8.800
6	Oleksandr Svitlychniy (UKR)	8.750
7	Alexander Jeltkov (CAN)	8.625
8	Jason Furr (USA)	8.525

===== High Bar =====
Rank	Gymnast	Score
1st place, gold medalist(s)	Philippe Rizzo (AUS)	9.737
2nd place, silver medalist(s)	Nikolai Kryukov (RUS)	9.712
3rd place, bronze medalist(s)	Huang Xu (CHN)	9.687
4	Brett McClure (USA)	9.625
5	Alexander Jeltkov (CAN)	9.500
6	Oleksandr Beresch (UKR)	9.287
7	Alexei Nemov (RUS)	8.462
8	Marius Urzica (ROU)	8.375

==== Women ====
===== Individual All-Around =====
Rank	Gymnast	Vault (gymnastics)	Uneven bars	Balance beam	Floor (gymnastics)	Total
1st place, gold medalist(s)	Sabina Cojocar (ROU)	9.062	9.368	8.962	9.462	36.854
2nd place, silver medalist(s)	Svetlana Khorkina (RUS)	8.962	9.568	9.737	8.350	36.617
3rd place, bronze medalist(s)	Elena Zamolodchikova (RUS)	9.225	9.500	9.075	8.512	36.312
4	Oksana Chusovitina (UZB)	8.825	9.262	8.862	8.662	35.611
5	Qi Linzi (CHN)	8.687	8.950	8.425	9.375	35.437
6	Allana Slater (AUS)	8.700	8.581	9.187	8.575	35.043
7	Carly Patterson (USA)	7.125	9.225	8.937	9.562	34.849
8	Tatiana Yarosh (UKR)	8.762	8.837	7.787	8.337	33.723
8	Kaitlin White (USA)	8.550	9.156	7.775	7.737	33.218
10	Danielle Kelly (AUS)	8.812	8.706	7.062	8.437	33.017
11	Olga Roschupkina (UKR)	7.587	8.718	7.362	9.012	32.679
12	Yang Yun (CHN)	7.937	0.000	8.612	8.787	25.336

===== Vault =====
Rank	Gymnast	Score
1st place, gold medalist(s)	Elena Zamolodchikova (RUS)	9.393
2nd place, silver medalist(s)	Oksana Chusovitina (UZB)	9.125
3rd place, bronze medalist(s)	Alona Kvasha (UKR)	8.987
4	Svetlana Khorkina (RUS)	8.968
5	Allison Johnston (AUS)	8.862
6	Andreea Ulmeanu (ROU)	8.674
7	Yang Yun (CHN)	8.668
8	Kaitlin White (USA)	8.168

===== Uneven Bars =====
Rank	Gymnast	Score
1st place, gold medalist(s)	Svetlana Khorkina (RUS)	9.712
2nd place, silver medalist(s)	Natalia Ziganshina (RUS)	9.425
3rd place, bronze medalist(s)	Hollie Vise (USA)	9.212
4	Yang Yun (CHN)	8.612
5	Olga Roschupkina (UKR)	8.562
6	Sun Xiaojiao (CHN)	8.550
7	Alona Kvasha (UKR)	8.537
8	Jacqui Dunn (AUS)	8.300

===== Balance Beam =====
Rank	Gymnast	Score
1st place, gold medalist(s)	Sun Xiaojiao (CHN)	9.662
2nd place, silver medalist(s)	Anna Pavlova (RUS)	9.062
3rd place, bronze medalist(s)	Hollie Vise (USA)	8.887
4	Natalia Ziganshina (RUS)	8.825
5	Carly Patterson (USA)	8.687
6	Sabina Cojocar (ROU)	8.475
7	Olga Roschupkina (UKR)	8.462
8	Allana Slater (AUS)	7.800

===== Floor =====
Rank	Gymnast	Score
1st place, gold medalist(s)	Elena Zamolodchikova (RUS)	8.950
2nd place, silver medalist(s)	Svetlana Khorkina (RUS)	8.587
3rd place, bronze medalist(s)	Sabina Cojocar (ROU)	8.462
4	Allison Johnston (AUS)	8.312
5	Tatiana Yarosh (UKR)	8.262
6	Andreea Ulmeanu (ROU)	8.087
7	Tia Orlando (USA)	7.725
8	Qi Linzi (CHN)	7.612

=== Rhythmic Gymnastics ===
==== Individual All Around ====
Rank	Gymnast	Score
1st place, gold medalist(s)	Irina Tchachina (RUS)	113.550
2nd place, silver medalist(s)	Alina Kabaeva (RUS)	112.600
3rd place, bronze medalist(s)	Simona Peycheva (BUL)	107.975
4	Anna Bessonova (UKR)	105.150
5	Eliza Gower (AUS)	101.225
6	Jessica Howard (USA)	100.250
7	Valeria Vatkina (BLR)	98.350
8	Kate Riley (AUS)	97.550

==== Rope ====
Rank	Gymnast	Score
1st place, gold medalist(s)	Alina Kabaeva (RUS)	28.875
2nd place, silver medalist(s)	Irina Tchachina (RUS)	28.350
3rd place, bronze medalist(s)	Simona Peycheva (BUL)	27.325
4	Anna Bessonova (UKR)	26.850
5	Valeria Vatkina (BLR)	24.750
6	Eliza Gower (AUS)	24.725
7	Jessica Howard (USA)	24.550
8	Kate Riley (AUS)	24.000

==== Hoop ====
Rank	Gymnast	Score
1st place, gold medalist(s)	Irina Tchachina (RUS)	28.525
2nd place, silver medalist(s)	Alina Kabaeva (RUS)	28.200
3rd place, bronze medalist(s)	Simona Peycheva (BUL)	27.300
4	Anna Bessonova (UKR)	26.925
5	Eliza Gower (AUS)	25.175
6	Jessica Howard (USA)	24.925
7	Kate Riley (AUS)	24.775
8	Valeria Vatkina (BLR)	24.000

==== Ball ====
Rank	Gymnast	Score
1st place, gold medalist(s)	Alina Kabaeva (RUS)	28.725
2nd place, silver medalist(s)	Irina Tchachina (RUS)	28.075
3rd place, bronze medalist(s)	Simona Peycheva (BUL)	26.600
4	Anna Bessonova (UKR)	26.575
5	Jessica Howard (USA)	24.800
6	Eliza Gower (AUS)	24.275
7	Kate Riley (AUS)	23.875
8	Valeria Vatkina (BLR)	23.000

==== Clubs ====
Rank	Gymnast	Score
1st place, gold medalist(s)	Alina Kabaeva (RUS)	29.200
2nd place, silver medalist(s)	Irina Tchachina (RUS)	28.900
3rd place, bronze medalist(s)	Anna Bessonova (UKR)	27.500
4	Simona Peycheva (BUL)	27.225
5	Jessica Howard (USA)	24.950
6	Valeria Vatkina (BLR)	24.775
7	Eliza Gower (AUS)	24.500
8	Kate Riley (AUS)	23.750

=== Trampolining ===
==== Men ====
Rank	Gymnast	Score
1st place, gold medalist(s)	Alexander Moskalenko (RUS)	71.50
2nd place, silver medalist(s)	Oleksandr Chemonos (UKR)	69.80
3rd place, bronze medalist(s)	Dimitri Polyarush (BLR)	69.60
4	Alan Villafuerte (NED)	69.10
5	Lee Brearley (GBR)	68.60
6	Scott Brown (AUS)	67.50
7	Ryan Weston (USA)	66.80
8	Matt Turgeon (CAN)	66.40

==== Women ====
Rank	Gymnast	Score
1st place, gold medalist(s)	Anna Dogonadze (GER)	68.00
2nd place, silver medalist(s)	Irina Karavayeva (RUS)	67.70
3rd place, bronze medalist(s)	Oxana Tsyhuleva (UKR)	67.30
4	Karen Cockburn (CAN)	67.10
5	Natalia Karpenkova (BLR)	65.20
6	Ekaterina Khilko (UZB)	64.30
7	Robyn Forbes (AUS)	53.40
8	Erin Maguire (USA)	27.40
