= 2001 Trampoline World Championships =

The 22nd Trampoline World Championships were held in Odense, Denmark from 26 July to 28 July 2001.

== Results ==
=== Men ===
==== Trampoline Individual ====
Rank	Country	Gymnast	Points
Gold medal	Russia	Alexander Moskalenko	43.50
Silver medal	Ukraine	Olexander Chernonos	41.40
Bronze medal	Netherlands	Alan Villafuerte	40.20
4	France	David Martin	38.80
5	Ukraine	Yuri Nikitin	18.60
6	Belarus	Dmitri Poliarouch	18.50
7	Russia	German Knytchev	11.40
8	Germany	Markus Kubicka	6.10

==== Trampoline Team ====
Rank	Country	Gymnasts	Points
Gold medal	Russia	Alexander Russakov; German Knytchev; Alexander Moskalenko; Sergei Iachev	126.10
Silver medal	Germany	Michael Serth; Markus Kubicka; Henrik Stehlik; Michael Kubicka	121.20
Bronze medal	France	Micheal Jala; Guillaume Bourgeon; David Martin; Sebastien Laifa	119.8
4	Ukraine	Zhan Yordanov; Yuri Nikitin; Oleksador Chernonos; Denys Vrazhkin	91.50
5	Belarus	Vladimir Kakorko; Nikolai Kazak; Dmitri Poliarush; Evgueni Beliaev	90.20

==== Trampoline Synchro ====
Rank	Country	Gymnasts	Points
Gold medal	Russia	Aleksandr Moskalenko; German Knychev	51.70
Silver medal	Germany	Michael Serth; Henrik Stehlik	50.80
Bronze medal	Belarus	Dmitri Poliarush; Evgueni Beliaev	50.50
4	Japan	Daisuke Nakata; Takayuki Kawanishi	50.10
5	Portugal	Nuno Lico joao Marques	48.90
6	Great Britain	Paul Simith; Lee Brearley	48.60
7	Poland	Arkadiusz Piluh; Konrad Bojakowiski	47.60
8	Spain	Javier Guerrero; Asier Zumieta	9.30

==== Double Mini Trampoline ====
Rank	Country	Gymnast	Points
Gold medal	Portugal	Nuno Lico	63.90
Silver medal	Portugal	Amadeu Neves	63.70
Bronze medal	Brazil	Rodolfo Rangel	63.60
4	United States	Keith Douglas	62.90
5	New Zealand	Justin Dougal	62.90
6	Bulgaria	Radostin Ratchev	62.50
7	Sweden	Nils Melkerud	61.80
8	Canada	Chris Mitruk	54.10

==== Double Mini Trampoline Team ====
Rank	Country	Gymnasts	Points
Gold medal	Portugal	Amadeu Neves; Nuno Lico; Nuno Merino; Diogo Faria	95.20
Silver medal	Spain	Asier Zumeta; Javier Guerrero; Ivan Ontiveros; Jose Manuel Munoz	94.20
Bronze medal	United States	Derrick Aldrich; Keith Douglas; David Ford; Josh Vance	93.90
4	Canada	Chris Mitruk; Ryan Ward; Marti Myers; Dave Parke	63.40
5	New Zealand	Steve Vette; Justin Dougal; Chris Ormandy; Anthony Jackson	53.20

==== Tumbling ====
Rank	Country	Gymnast	Points
Gold medal	Russia	Denis Serdioukov	77.30
Silver medal	France	Nicolas Fournials	74.80
Bronze medal	Russia	Levon Petroian	72.80
4	France	Alexandre Dechanet	71.30
5	United States	Frankie Hartman	71.10
6	Lithuania	Aleksander Barkov	69.90
7	Great Britain	Robert Small	69.00
8	South Africa	Thato Morubane	68.90

==== Tumbling Team ====
Rank	Country	Gymnast	Points
Gold medal	Russia	Denis Serdioukov; Levon Petroian; Alexei Batienko; Alexei Kryjanovski	113.50
Silver medal	South Africa	Thato Morubane; Jackonia Seepamore; Tseko Mogotsi; Eon van Zyl	110.00
Bronze medal	United States	Frankie Hartman; Chris Helton; Brad Davis; Jared Olsen	108.30
4	Great Britain	Robert Small; Richard Harris; Damien Walters	107.10
5	France	Nicolas Fournials; Alexandre Dechanet; Nicolas Divry; Gael Manry	96.20

=== Women ===
==== Trampoline Individual ====
Rank	Country	Gymnast	Points
Gold medal	Germany	Anna Dogonadze-Lilkendey	40.80
Silver medal	Russia	Irina Karavaeva	40.70
Bronze medal	Great Britain	Claire Wright	39.10
4	Ukraine	Olena Movchan	39.10
5	Canada	Karen Cockburn	38.90
6	Belarus	Galina Lebedeva	37.70
7	Russia	Marina Mourinova	37.40
8	Ukraine	Oxana Tsyhuleva	5.80

==== Trampoline Team ====
Rank	Country	Gymnasts	Points
Gold medal	Ukraine	Oxana Tsyhuleva; Yulia Domshevsky; Olena Movchan; Oxana Pochynok	115.80
Silver medal	Germany	Nicole Maintz; Anna Dogonadze-Lilkendey; Tina Ludwig; Irmgard Erl	115.50
Bronze medal	Great Britain	Claire Wright; Kirsten Lawton; Victoria Pollard; Aurora Necco	114.40
4	Canada	Karen Cockburn; Brenna Casey; Heather Ross-McManus; Lydia Zanon	114.40
5	Belarus	Galina Lebedeva; Liudmila Padasenko; Natalia Karpenkova; Tatiana Petrenia	113.30

==== Trampoline Synchro ====
Rank	Country	Gymnasts	Points
Gold medal	Ukraine	Oksana Tsyhuleva; Olena Movchan	50.50
Silver medal	Germany	Tina Ludwig; Anna Dogonadze-Lilkendey	49.90
Bronze medal	Belarus	Natalia Karpenkova; Galina Lebedeva	48.10
4	Canada	Lydia Zanon; Karen Cockburn	47.40
5	Great Britain	Claire Wright; Kirsten Lawton	46.20
6	France	Magali Trouche; Stephanie Pallanche	45.50
7	Russia	Natalia Chernova; Irina Karavaeva	37.70
8	Japan	Hiroi Tokuma; Akiko Furu	23.00

==== Double Mini Trampoline ====
Rank	Country	Gymnast	Points
Gold medal	Russia	Marina Mourinova	62.20
Silver medal	Argentina	Mónica Fernández	61.80
Bronze medal	Slovakia	Katarina Prokesova	61.10
4	United States	Dede Magavero	59.60
5	Canada	Cheryl Johnson	51.40
6	United States	Tara Sewell	42.10
7	Australia	Jacinta Harford	31.00
8	Portugal	Sabrina Teixeira	29.60

==== Double Mini Trampoline Team ====
Rank	Country	Gymnasts	Points
Gold medal	Russia	Irina Vassilieva; Marina Mourinova; Svetlana Balandina	93.80
Silver medal	Portugal	Rita Costa; Marta Ferreira; Raquel Pinto; Sabrina Teixeira	92.90
Bronze medal	Australia	Kahli Ridge; Robyn Forbes; Jacinta Harford	92.70
4	United States	Erin Smith; Tara Sewell; Debe Magavero	92.30
5	Canada	Lisa Colussi- Mitruk; Cheryl Johnson; Shannon Lee; Cassandra Siwek	92.00

==== Tumbling ====
Rank	Country	Gymnast	Points
Gold medal	Ukraine	Olena Chabanenko	73.30
Silver medal	United States	Lajeana Davis	69.60
Bronze medal	Great Britain	Kathryn Peberdy	69.50
4	Russia	Anna Korobeynikova	68.70
5	United States	Alisha Robinson	68.10
6	Russia	Anna Gaiganova	66.10
7	Ukraine	Tetyana Zhoutodup	66.00
8	France	Sevim Temal	64.00

==== Tumbling Team ====
Rank	Country	Gymnasts	Points
Gold medal	Russia	Elena Bloujina; Tatiana Chakhnovskaia; Anna Korobeinkova; Anna Gaiganova	103.40
Silver medal	Ukraine	Olena Chabanenko; Tetyana Zhoutodup; Olena Dribna; Khrystyna Zhereznyak	101.80
Bronze medal	Great Britain	Kathryn Peberdy; Elisabeth Gough; Zoe Styles	99.10
4	France	Sevim Temal; Marlene Bayet; Melanie Avisse; Marion Limbach	97.00
5	Belarus	Hanna Tsiarenia; Katsiaryna Kuziankova; Yashkevic Mazian; Hanna Pazniakova	94.00
