= Gymnastics at the 2004 Summer Olympics – Women's trampoline =

Women's trampoline events at the Olympics

Women's trampoline at the Games of the XXVIII Olympiad

Medalists
1st place, gold medalist(s)		Anna Dogonadze	Germany
2nd place, silver medalist(s)		Karen Cockburn	Canada
3rd place, bronze medalist(s)		Huang Shanshan	China

These are the results for the women's individual trampoline competition, one of two events of the trampoline discipline contested in the gymnastics at the 2004 Summer Olympics in Athens. The qualification and final rounds took place on August 20 at the Olympic Indoor Hall.

== Results ==
=== Qualification ===
Sixteen gymnasts competed in the qualification round by performing a compulsory routine followed by a free routine. For the compulsory routine (#1), each gymnast received a score from 0.0 to 10.0 from each of the five execution judges, with the highest and lowest scores being dropped. The free routine (#2) had a similar format but included a difficulty score, determined by two difficulty judges, which was added to the three kept scores from the execution judges. The scores from the two routines were summed to give the total score and the eight highest scoring gymnasts advanced to the final.

Rank	Gymnast	Country	#	Greece	Spain	Brazil	Sweden	Czech Republic	Difficulty score	Routine score	Total	
1	Natalia Chernova	Russia	1	9.3	9.3	9.5	9.5	9.3	—	28.10	66.80	Q
1	Natalia Chernova	--	2	7.9	8.3	8.1	8.4	8.3	14.0	38.70	66.80	Q
2	Anna Dogonadze	Germany	1	9.0	9.1	9.0	9.3	9.2	—	27.30	66.70	Q
2	Anna Dogonadze	--	2	8.3	8.4	8.4	8.5	8.4	14.2	39.40	66.70	Q
3	Olena Movchan	Ukraine	1	9.0	9.2	9.2	9.4	9.4	—	27.80	65.80	Q
3	Olena Movchan	--	2	8.0	7.8	8.2	8.1	7.6	14.1	38.00	65.80	Q
4	Huang Shanshan	China	1	8.9	8.7	8.8	8.7	8.9	—	26.40	65.40	Q
4	Huang Shanshan	--	2	8.2	8.6	8.3	8.4	8.3	14.0	39.00	65.40	Q
5	Karen Cockburn	Canada	1	8.9	9.0	8.7	9.1	9.1	—	27.00	65.10	Q
5	Karen Cockburn	--	2	8.2	8.1	7.7	8.1	7.7	14.2	38.10	65.10	Q
6	Heather Ross-McManus	Canada	1	9.2	9.1	8.4	8.8	8.9	—	26.80	63.80	Q
6	Heather Ross-McManus	--	2	7.8	7.5	7.3	7.8	7.7	14.0	37.00	63.80	Q
7	Haruka Hirota	Japan	1	8.7	8.9	9.1	9.0	9.0	—	26.90	63.00	Q
7	Haruka Hirota	--	2	7.7	7.8	7.6	7.9	7.8	12.8	36.10	63.00	Q
8	Andrea Lenders	Netherlands	1	9.1	9.2	9.0	9.1	9.2	—	27.40	62.70	Q
8	Andrea Lenders	--	2	7.5	7.7	7.5	7.6	7.4	12.7	35.30	62.70	Q
9	Rusudan Khoperia	Georgia	1	8.6	8.8	8.5	8.9	9.0	—	26.30	62.50	
9	Rusudan Khoperia	--	2	7.7	7.3	7.8	7.4	7.3	13.8	36.20	62.50	
10	Katerina Prokesova	Slovakia	1	8.8	8.4	8.6	8.6	8.7	—	25.90	61.90	
10	Katerina Prokesova	--	2	7.6	7.6	7.6	7.7	7.3	13.2	36.00	61.90	
11	Ekaterina Khilko	Uzbekistan	1	8.6	8.7	9.2	9.1	9.0	—	26.80	61.60	
11	Ekaterina Khilko	--	2	7.3	7.2	7.1	7.3	7.2	13.1	34.80	61.60	
12	Kirsten Lawton	Great Britain	1	9.0	9.1	9.3	9.2	9.3	—	27.60	60.20	
12	Kirsten Lawton	--	2	6.9	7.0	6.8	6.9	7.0	11.8	32.60	60.20	
13	Lesley Daly	Australia	1	8.5	8.4	8.9	8.8	8.5	—	25.80	58.90	
13	Lesley Daly	--	2	6.7	6.8	6.7	6.7	6.7	13.0	33.10	58.90	
14	Jennifer Parilla	United States	1	9.0	9.1	8.7	9.0	8.9	—	26.90	52.70	
14	Jennifer Parilla	--	2	5.2	4.8	5.3	5.1	4.8	10.7	25.80	52.70	
15	Irina Karavaeva	Russia	1	9.2	8.9	8.9	9.0	9.3	—	27.10	39.90	
15	Irina Karavaeva	--	2	2.2	2.2	2.2	2.4	2.2	6.2	12.80	39.90	
16	Tatsiana Piatrenia	Belarus	1	9.2	9.2	9.1	9.2	9.3	—	27.60	32.90	
16	Tatsiana Piatrenia	--	2	0.6	0.6	0.7	0.7	0.6	3.4	5.30	32.90	

=== Final ===
The eight qualified gymnasts performed a single free routine with the same scoring format as in the qualification round.

Rank	Gymnast	Greece	Spain	Brazil	Sweden	Czech Republic	Difficulty score	Total
Gold medal	Anna Dogonadze (GER)	8.3	8.4	8.5	8.6	8.5	14.2	39.60
Silver medal	Karen Cockburn (CAN)	8.0	8.2	8.2	8.3	8.2	14.6	39.20
Bronze medal	Huang Shanshan (CHN)	8.2	8.3	8.4	8.4	8.3	14.0	39.00
4	Natalia Chernova (RUS)	8.0	8.2	8.1	8.3	8.3	14.0	38.60
5	Olena Movchan (UKR)	8.1	8.2	8.3	8.3	8.1	13.0	37.60
6	Heather Ross-McManus (CAN)	7.9	7.6	7.7	7.7	7.6	14.4	37.40
7	Haruka Hirota (JPN)	7.8	8.2	8.1	8.1	8.4	12.8	37.20
8	Andrea Lenders (NED)	5.7	5.6	5.4	5.6	5.5	7.6	24.30
