= 1994 Trampoline World Championships =

The 18th Trampoline World Championships were held in Porto, Portugal from 7 October to 9 October 1994.

== Results ==
=== Men ===
==== Trampoline Individual ====
Rank	Country	Gymnast	Points
Gold medal	Russia	Alexander Moskalenko	41.00
Silver medal	Belarus	Dmitri Poliarouch	40.10
Bronze medal	Belarus	Nikolai Kazak	38.60
4	France	Fabrice Hennique	38.10
5	France	Fabrice Schwertz	37.00
6	Ukraine	Igor Sokolovsky	36.90
7	Ukraine	Yuri Nikitin	35.90
8	Great Britain	Theo Kypri	35.00

==== Trampoline Team ====
Rank	Country	Gymnasts	Points
Gold medal	Belarus	Dmitri Poliarouch; Nikolai Kazak; Denis Shishov; Viatseslav Morozov	201.40
Silver medal	Russia	Alexander Moskalenko; German Knytchev; Alexander Danilchenko; Igor Durnev	200.90
Bronze medal	France	Fabrice Hennique; Jean-Pierre Thorn; Fabrice Schwertz; Denis Passemard	197.10
4	Ukraine	Igor Sokolovsky; Sergei Bukhovtsev; Nikolai Malikov; Yuri Nikitin	194.70
5	Great Britain	Theo Kypri; Paull Smyth; Luke Porter; David Herring	189.80

==== Trampoline Synchro ====
Rank	Country	Gymnasts	Points
Gold medal	Russia	Alexander Moskalenko; Alexander Danilchenko	49.20
Silver medal	Belarus	Dmitri Poliaroush; Evgeni Beliaev	48.60
Bronze medal	Ukraine	Igor Sokolovsky; Yuri Nikitin	46.80
4	Japan	Daisuke Nakata; Goroh Tachizaki	45.70
5	Poland	Krystian Sawicki; Jakub Zaim	45.60
6	Australia	Michael Johnston; Adrian Wareham	44.90
7	Netherlands	Alan Villafuerte; Lennard Villafuerte	44.40
8	Great Britain	Luke Porter; David Herring	44.20

==== Double Mini Trampoline ====
Rank	Country	Gymnast	Points
Gold medal	Portugal	Jorge Pereira	12.10
Silver medal	Australia	Adrian Wareham	11.90
Bronze medal	Portugal	Luis Nunes	11.80
4	Canada	Jeremy Brock	11.60
5	Bulgaria	Radostin Todorov	11.50
6	New Zealand	Tom Delany	11.40
7	Germany	Jörg Gehrke	11.10
8	Canada	Michel Greene	10.70

==== Double Mini Trampoline Team ====
Rank	Country	Gymnasts	Points
=	Germany	Jörg Gehrke; Steffen Eislöffel; Pascual Robles; Uwe Marquardt	52.50
=	Portugal	Diogo Faria; Carlos Nobre; Luis Nunes; Jorge Pereira	52.50
=	Australia	Ji Wallace; Adrian Wareham; Paul Vavnor; Michael Johnston	50.20
=	Canada	Angelo Despotas; Jeremy Brock; Dominic Dagenais; Michel Greene	50.20
5	United States	Karl Heger; Richard Hartman; Jason Zulauf; Brad Davis	47.70

==== Tumbling ====
Rank	Country	Gymnast	Points
Gold medal	Poland	Adrian Sienkiewicz	
Silver medal	United States	Rayshine Harris	
Bronze medal	France	Pascal Eouzan	
4	France	Stephane Bayol	
5	Portugal	Sergio Nascimento	
6	United States	Jon Beck	
7	Poland	Krzysztof Wilusz	
8	Canada	Keith McDonald	

==== Tumbling Team ====
Rank	Country	Gymnasts	Points
Gold medal	United States	Rayshine Harris; Jon Beck; Daniel Aldea; Rashaan Sampson	147.23
Silver medal	Poland	Krzysztof Wilusz; Adrian Sienkiewicz; Jerzy Trzaska; Tomasz Kies	146.51
Bronze medal	France	Pascal Eouzan; Stephane Bayol; Franck Salcines; Christophe Freroux	144.61
4	Canada	Carey Jones; Chris Shaw; Steve Grannary; Keith McDonald	136.20
5	Portugal	Sergio Nascimento; Hugo Reis; Vitor Amador; Nuno Pereira	134.17

=== Women ===
==== Trampoline Individual ====
Rank	Country	Gymnast	Points
Gold medal	Russia	Irina Karavaeva	39.80
Silver medal	Great Britain	Andrea Holmes	37.80
Bronze medal	Russia	Tatiana Lushina	37.40
4	Ukraine	Lada Tsebrenko	37.20
5	Great Britain	Sue Challis	37.00
6	Belarus	Natalia Karpenkova	36.60
7	Ukraine	Olena Movchan	36.30
=8	Belarus	Galina Lebedeva	35.70
=8	Germany	Tina Ludwig	35.70

==== Trampoline Team ====
Rank	Country	Gymnasts	Points
Gold medal	Russia	Irina Karavaeva; Tatiana Lushina; Irina Slonova; Natalia Chernova	190.20
Silver medal	Ukraine	Lada Tsebrenko; Olena Movchan; Oxana Tsyguliova; Larisa Khrestchik	187.80
Bronze medal	Great Britain	Andrea Holmes; Sue Challis; Claire Wright; Lorraine Lyon	186.1
4	Germany	Tina Ludwig; Hiltrud Roewe; Sandra Beck; Gabi Dreier	185.00
5	Belarus	Natalia Karpenkova; Galina Lebedeva; Ludmila Padasenko; Marina Nikitina	184.70

==== Trampoline Synchro ====
Rank	Country	Gymnasts	Points
Gold medal	Germany	Hiltrud Roewe; Tina Ludwig	46.40
Silver medal	Belarus	Galina Lebedeva; Natalia Karpenkova	46.20
Bronze medal	Ukraine	Oxana Tsyguliova; Olena Movchan	46.00
4	Russia	Irina Karavaeva; Natalia Chernova	45.90
5	Great Britain	Lorraine Lyon; Andrea Holmes	44.70
6	France	Magali Trouche; Alice Besseige	44.40
7	Netherlands	Inke van Braak; Yvonne Hartog	44.00
8	Great Britain	Sylwia Langner; Marta Kubiak	43.50

==== Double Mini Trampoline ====
Rank	Country	Gymnast	Points
Gold medal	New Zealand	Kylie Walker	11.10
Silver medal	United States	Jaime Strandmark	11.00
Bronze medal	United States	Kimberly Sans	10.80
=4	Canada	Lisa Colussi	10.30
=4	Australia	Donna White	10.30
6	Australia	Kate McDougal	9.90
=7	Germany	Ute Springub	9.70
=7	New Zealand	Tiffany Smith	9.70

==== Double Mini Trampoline Team ====
Rank	Country	Gymnasts	Points
Gold medal	United States	Jennifer Sans; Kimberly Sans; Jennifer Parilla; Jaime Strandmark	45.90
=	Germany	Gretje Reinemer; Nadine Intrup; Nicole Krüger; Ute Springub	44.90
=	New Zealand	Kylie Walker; Alana Boulton; Angela O'Brien; Tiffany Smith	44.90
4	Australia	Robyn Forbes; Donna White; Kate McDougal	43.70
5	Canada	Lisa Colussi; Martha Purdy; Devena Ratcliffe; Karina Kosko	41.30

==== Tumbling ====
Rank	Country	Gymnast	Points
Gold medal	France	Chrystel Robert	
Silver medal	France	Christelle Giroud	
Bronze medal	Belgium	Sigy van Renterghem	
4	Canada	Kris Smeelen	
5	United States	Tiffany Simpson	
6	United States	Brianne Smith	
7	Australia	Elisabeth Hezlop	
8	Canada	Karen Stevens	

==== Tumbling Team ====
Rank	Country	Gymnasts	Points
Gold medal	France	Chrystel Robert; Christelle Giroud; Corinne Robert; Marie Guinet	135.99
Silver medal	Belgium	Yolanda Wouters; Sigy Van Renterghem; Mireille Meermans; Patricia Nolf	131.96
Bronze medal	Canada	Kris Smeelen; Karen Stevens; Alison Wammel; Tammy Thrasher	130.32
4	United States	Tiffany Simpson; Kendra Stucki; Brianne Smith; Emily Giglio	129.50
5	South Africa	Lara Painting; Jenny Pickston; Liezl Miller; Sunet Seyffert	119.54
