= 1999 Trampoline World Championships =

Championship edition

The 21st Trampoline World Championships were held in Sun City, South Africa from 30 September to 3 October 1999.

== Results ==
=== Men ===
==== Trampoline Individual ====
Rank	Country	Gymnast	Points
Gold medal	Russia	Aleksandr Moskalenko	111.0
Silver medal	Belarus	Nikolai Kazak	109.5
Bronze medal	France	David Martin	107.5
4	Belarus	Dmitri Poliarouch	107.2
5	Australia	Ji Wallace	106.5
6	Ukraine	Olexander Chernonos	104.7
7	Russia	Sergei Lachev	104.7
8	Netherlands	Alan Villafuerte	79.6

==== Trampoline Team ====
Rank	Country	Gymnasts	Points
Gold medal	Russia	Alexander Russakov; German Knytchev; Alexander Moskalenko; Sergei Iachev	119.4
Silver medal	Germany	Michael Serth; Markus Kubicka; Henrik Stehlik; Stefan Reithofer	115.7
Bronze medal	Canada	Ben Snape; Chris Mitruk; Mathieu Turgeon; Michel Greene	115.5
4	France	Sebastian Laifa; Guillaume Bourgeon; David Martin; Emmanuel Durand	114.3
5	Belarus	Vladimir Kakorko; Nikolai Kazak; Dmitri Poliarouch	88.3

==== Trampoline Synchro ====
Rank	Country	Gymnasts	Points
Gold medal	Russia	Aleksandr Moskalenko; German Khnychev	135.50
Silver medal	Belarus	Nikolai Kazak; Vladimir Kakorko	134.80
Bronze medal	Ukraine	Sergei Bukovtsev; Olexander Chernonos	132.20
4	Japan	Daisuke Nakata; Keita Sugai	129.5
5	Germany	Michael Serth; Stefan Reithofer	128.90
6	United States	David Popkin; Ryan Weston	127.00
7	Canada	Michel Greene; Chris Mitruk	126.80
8	Portugal	Joao Marques; Nuno Lico	118.90

==== Double Mini Trampoline ====
Rank	Country	Gymnast	Points
Gold medal	Canada	Chris Mitruk	25.00
Silver medal	Germany	Jorg Gehrke	24.53
Bronze medal	Brazil	Rodolfo Rangel	24.33
4	Portugal	Nuno Merino	23.86
5	New Zealand	Justin Dougal	22.87
6	United States	Ryan Weston	22.60
7	United States	Mark Griffith	22.47
8	Sweden	Nils Melkerud	22.00

==== Double Mini Trampoline Team ====
Rank	Country	Gymnasts	Points
Gold medal	United States	Mark Griffith; Karl Heger; Byron Smith; Ryan Weston	35.07
Silver medal	Germany	Jorg Gehrke; Uwe Marquardt; Dennis Luxon; Michael Dobert	34.60
Bronze medal	Canada	Chris Mitruk; Ryan Ward; Scott Fischer; Jeremy Brock	34.01
4	New Zealand	Justin Dougal; Chris Ormandy; Steven Vette; Marcus Leslie	33.33
5	Sweden	Martin Innala; Mathias Lindeberg; Nils Melkerud; Douglas Jansson	29.40

==== Tumbling ====
Rank	Country	Gymnast	Points
Gold medal	Russia	Levon Petrosian	85.90
Silver medal	Russia	Alexei Kryjanovski	85.10
Bronze medal	Great Britain	Robert Small	83.71
4	Denmark	Martin Jyde Nielsen	82.53
5	United States	Brad Davis	81.27
6	France	Alexandre Dechanet	81.27
7	Great Britain	Ross Gibson	80.77
8	Poland	Tomasz Kies	77.87

==== Tumbling Team ====
Rank	Country	Gymnasts	Points
Gold medal	Russia		87.60
Silver medal	France		84.50
Bronze medal	Great Britain		83.80
4	Denmark		82.44
5	United States		81.44

=== Women ===
==== Trampoline Individual ====
Rank	Country	Gymnast	Points
Gold medal	Russia	Irina Karavaeva	108.90
Silver medal	Ukraine	Oxana Tsyhuleva	108.10
Bronze medal	Germany	Anna Dogonadze-Lilkendey	106.40
4	Ukraine	Olena Movchan	104.80
5	Russia	Natalia Chernova	104.50
6	Belarus	Natalia Karpenkova	103.20
7	Canada	Karen Cockburn	102.60
8	Uzbekistan	Ekaterina Khilko	102.60

==== Trampoline Team ====
Rank	Country	Gymnasts	Points
Gold medal	Russia	Irina Karavaeva; Natalia Chernova; Marina Mourinova; Tatiana Kovaleva	113.50
Silver medal	Ukraine	Oxana Tsyhuleva; Olena Movchan; Oxana Verbitskaya	113.20
Bronze medal	Belarus	Galina Lebedeva; Liudmila Padasenko; Natalia Karpenkova; Tatsiana Piatrenia	110.30
4	Germany	Tina Ludwig; Irmgard Erl; Nicole Maintz; Anna Dogonadze-Lilkendey	109.50
5	Great Britain	Claire Wright; Kirsten Lawton; Jaime Moore; Vicky Pollard	107.60

==== Trampoline Synchro ====
Rank	Country	Gymnasts	Points
Gold medal	Ukraine	Oxana Tsyhuleva; Elena Movchan	133.10
Silver medal	Germany	Tina Ludwig; Anna Dogonadze-Lilkendey	132.90
Bronze medal	Russia	Natalia Chernova; Irina Karavaeva	131.90
4	Belarus	Natalia Karpenkova; Galina Lebedeva	130.30
5	Great Britain	Claire Wright; Kirsten Lawton	128.20
6	Poland	Sylwia Durlik; Marta KubiaK	126.10
7	United States	Jennifer Sans; Jennifer Parilla	125.80
8	Canada	Karen Cockburn; Lydia Zanon	123.20

==== Double Mini Trampoline ====
Rank	Country	Gymnast	Points
Gold medal	Canada	Lisa Colussi-Mitruk	22.40
Silver medal	Russia	Marina Mourinova	21.47
Bronze medal	United States	Erin Maguire	21.27
4	Russia	Alla Trifonova	21.13
5	Australia	Jacinta Harford	20.60
6	Belgium	Ilse Despriet	20.47
7	Germany	Kathrin Deuner	20.33
8	Portugal	Raquel Pinto	20.10

==== Double Mini Trampoline Team ====
Rank	Country	Gymnasts	Points
Gold medal	Portugal	Marta Ferreira; Raquel Pinto; Rita Costa; Sónia Oliveira	31.13
Silver medal	Australia		30.92
Bronze medal	Canada		29.67
4	Bulgaria	Antonia Ivanova; Teodora Sinilkova; Daniela Petrova	28.6
5	United States		28.20

==== Tumbling ====
Rank	Country	Gymnast	Points
Gold medal	Russia	Elena Bloujina	79.69
Silver medal	France	Chrystel Robert	78.07
Bronze medal	France	Melanie Avisse	76.17
4	United States	Amanda Lentz	75.87
5	Great Britain	Kathryn Peberdy	74.37
6	Great Britain	Melanie Thompson	73.97
7	Russia	Tatiana Chakhnovskaia	73.97
8	United States	Lajeana Davis	71.63

==== Tumbling Team ====
Rank	Country	Gymnasts	Points
Gold medal	Russia		77.46
Silver medal	France		75.77
Bronze medal	Ukraine		75.24
4	United States		74.17
5	Great Britain		73.16
