= 2003 Trampoline World Championships =

The 23rd Trampoline World Championships were held in Hannover, Germany, from 17 October to 19 October 2003.

== Results ==
=== Men ===
==== Trampoline individual ====
Rank	Country	Gymnast	Points
Gold medal	Germany	Henrik Stehlik	41.5
Silver medal	Russia	Alexander Moskalenko	41.5
Bronze medal	France	David Martin	41.3
4	Russia	Alexander Rushakov	40.9
5	Belarus	Vladimir Kakorko	40.5
6	Ukraine	Yuri Nikitin	40
7	Portugal	Nuno Merino	39.6
8	Belarus	Dimitri Polyarush	30.7

==== Trampoline team ====
Rank	Country	Gymnasts	Points
Gold medal	Germany	Michael Serth; Markus Kubicka; Henrik Stehlik; Adam Gotz	120.80
Silver medal	Russia	Alexander Russakov; German Knytchev; Alexander Moskalenko; Stanislav Pokroev	120.70
Bronze medal	Ukraine	Zhan Yordanov; Denys Vrazhkin; Oleksandr Chernonos; Yuri Nikitin	120.20
4	France	Sebastian Laifa; Guillaume Bourgeon; David Martin; Ulrich Borchand	120.00
5	Belarus	Vladimir Kakorko; Nikolai Kazak; Dmitri Poliarush; Anton Prischepov	119.20

==== Trampoline synchro ====
Rank	Country	Gymnast	Points
Gold medal	Belarus	Nikolai Kazak; Dimitri Polyarush	51.2
Silver medal	Russia	Alexander Rusakov; Alexander Leven	50.8
Bronze medal	Ukraine	Yuri Nikitin; Olexander Chernonos	50.2
4	Switzerland	Michel Boillet; Ludovic Martin	49.5
5	United States	David Ford; Ryan Weston	47.6
6	Great Britain	Simon Milnes; Mark Alexander	47.2
7	Portugal	Amadeu Neves; Nuno Merino	19.5
8	France	Mickaël Jala; Sébastien Laifa	14.6

==== Double mini trampoline ====
Rank	Country	Gymnast	Points
Gold medal	Russia	Alexei Ilichev	64.50
Silver medal	Canada	Adam Menzies	64.40
Bronze medal	Germany	Nico Garter	63.90
4	Canada	Chris Mitruk	63.40
5	Brazil	Gabriel Miranda	63.20
6	Moldova	Vladimir Cojoc	62.60
7	United States	Keith Douglas	62.60
8	Bulgaria	Radostin Ratchev	32.00

==== Double mini trampoline team ====
Rank	Country	Gymnasts	Points
Gold medal	Canada	Chris Mitruk; Adam Menzies; Bryan Milonja; Denis Vachon	96.10
Silver medal	United States	Keith Douglas; Casey Finley; Jamar Young; Josh Vance	95.50
Bronze medal	Germany	Nico Garter; Denis Luxon; Uwe Marquardt; Martin Gromowski	95.00
4	New Zealand	Anthony Jackson; Justin Dougal; Chris Ormandy; Richard Henry	94.10
5	Russia	Alexei Ilichev; Stanislav Pokroev; Alexei Borovikov; Evgeniy Kolokolytsev	31.30

==== Tumbling ====
Rank	Country	Gymnast	Points
Gold medal	Russia	Alexei Kryzhanovski	76.6
Silver medal	China	Pan Huanian	76.2
Bronze medal	Russia	Alexei Bantienko	75.4
4	South Africa	Tseko Mogotsi	74.6
5	Great Britain	Damien Walters	74.2
6	United States	Jamar Young	68.8
7	Great Britain	Robert Proctor	66.8
8	France	Yves Tarin	65.8

==== Tumbling team ====
Rank	Country	Gymnasts	Points
Gold medal	Great Britain	Robert Small; Christopher Porter; Damien Walters; Robert Proctor	112.30
Silver medal	France	Nicolas Fournials; Alexandre Dechanet; Yves Tarin; Gael Manry	111.40
Bronze medal	Russia	Alexandre Skorodunov; Andrey Dukhnov; Alexei Batienko; Alexei Kryzhanovski	110.70
4	United States	Casey Finley; Daniel Walker; Jamar Young; Jared Olsen	110.70
5	China	Huanian Pan; Ling Gu; Jie Gao	100.60

=== Women ===
==== Trampoline individual ====
Rank	Country	Gymnast	Points
Gold medal	Canada	Karen Cockburn	40.2
Silver medal	Ukraine	Olena Movchan	39.7
Bronze medal	Germany	Anna Dogonadze	39.2
4	Russia	Natalia Chernova	39.1
5	Canada	Heather Ross-McManus	39.0
6	Great Britain	Kirsten Lawton	39.0
7	Russia	Irina Karavaeva	38.6
8	China	Huang Shanshan	12.9

==== Trampoline team ====
Rank	Country	Gymnasts	Points
Gold medal	Russia	Irina Karavaeva; Natalia Chernova; Natalia Kolesnikova; Irina Vasilyeva	116.90
Silver medal	China	Huang Shanshan; Min Lin; Xiaojun Zheng; Wenjuan Wang	115.30
Bronze medal	Canada	Karen Cockburn; Brenna Casey; Heather Ross-McManus; Savija McManus	109.90
4	Ukraine	Svitlana Sigitova; Yulia Domchevska; Olena Movchan; Oxana Pochynok	76.80
5	Great Britain	Claire Wright; Kirsten Lawton; Aurora Necco; Natalia O'Connor	76.00

==== Trampoline synchro ====
Rank	Country	Gymnasts	Points
Gold medal	Belarus	Tatsiana Piatrenia; Galina Lebedeva	48.8
Silver medal	Ukraine	Yulia Domchevska; Olena Movchan	48.1
Bronze medal	Germany	Jessica Simon; Anna Dogonadze	46.4
4	Japan	Naomi Nishioka; Haruka Hirota	45.6
5	Great Britain	Claire Wright; Kirsten Lawton	44.9
6	France	Aurore Monin; Julie Perreten	44
7	Russia	Irina Karavaeva; Natalia Kolesnikova	17.7
8	Canada	Heather Ross-McManus; Karen Cockburn	5.1

==== Double mini trampoline ====
Rank	Country	Gymnast	Points
Gold medal	Canada	Sarah Charles	62.20
Silver medal	Bulgaria	Antoniya Ivanova	61.80
Bronze medal	United States	Shelly Klochan	61.60
4	Russia	Galina Gontcharenko	61.50
5	Argentina	Mónica Fernández	51.90
6	United States	Drew Rentfro	51.80
7	Canada	Julie Warnock	31.10
8	Russia	Irina Vasilyeva	30.70

==== Double mini trampoline team ====
Rank	Country	Gymnasts	Points
Gold medal	Russia	Irina Vassilieva; Maria Kozlova; Svetlana Balandina; Galina Gontcharenko	94.10
Silver medal	United States	Drew Rentfro; Shelly Klochan; Megan Dacy; Whitney Kusak	93.40
Bronze medal	Germany	Anika Cloppernburg; Nancy Rinkau; Christina Jansen; Kathrin Deuner	92.90
4	Portugal	Filipa Victor; Marta Ferreira; Raquel Pinto; Sabrina Teixeira	92.80
5	Canada	Julie Warnock; Sarah Charles; Brenna Casey; Sarah Caruso	83.90

==== Tumbling ====
Rank	Country	Gymnast	Points
Gold medal	Ukraine	Olena Chabanenko	74.1
Silver medal	Great Britain	Kathryn Peberdy	73.7
Bronze medal	Russia	Anna Korobeynikova	71.5
4	Great Britain	Charmaine Salla	66.1
5	France	Emeline Millory	65.5
6	Russia	Natalia Rakhmanova	63.9
7	Argentina	Yanina Silva	52.6
8	France	Delphine Francois	32.4

==== Tumbling team ====
Rank	Country	Gymnasts	Points
Gold medal	Great Britain	Kathryn Peberdy; Julie Cheung; Donna Mac Lean; Charmaine Salla	102.70
Silver medal	Russia	Elena Bloujina; Natalia Rakhmanova; Anna Korobeinkova; Tatiana Danilina	98.30
Bronze medal	France	Delphine Francois; Emeline Millory; Marion Limbach	98.10
4	Ukraine	Olena Chabanenko; Olga Pashkova; Anna Zayarna; Oksana Vstryetyentseva	96.00
5	Kazakhstan	Aliya Nurtazina; Yevgenia Kazakevich; Yuliya Reznichenko	93.50

== Sources ==
- 23rd Trampoline World Championships Hannover 2003, Trampoline UK
