= Trampoline gymnastics at the 2001 World Games =

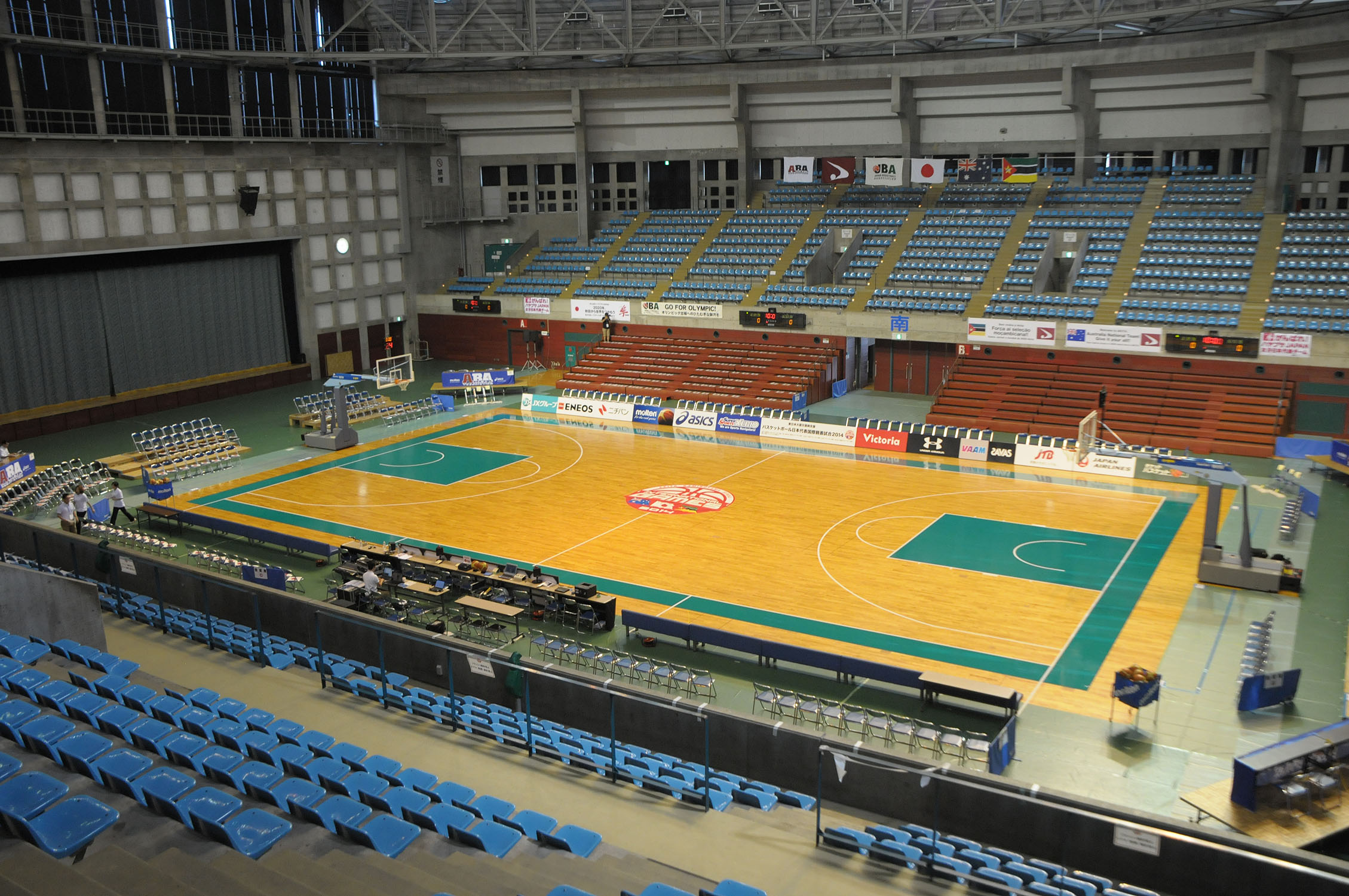
- Akita City Gymnasium
- Venue: Akita City Gymnasium
- Dates: 19–21 August 2001
- Competitors: 75 from 22 nations

The trampoline gymnastics tournaments at the 2001 World Games in Akita was played between 19 and 21 August. 75 acrobatic gymnastics competitors, from 22 nations, participated in the tournament. The trampoline gymnastics competition took place at Akita City Gymnasium.

== Participating nations ==
- Australia (5)
- Belarus (6)
- Belgium (1)
- Brazil (2)
- Bulgaria (2)
- Canada (2)
- Denmark (3)
- France (3)
- Germany (6)
- Great Britain (6)
- Japan (7)
- Kazakhstan (1)
- New Zealand (2)
- Poland (1)
- Portugal (5)
- Russia (7)
- Slovakia (2)
- South Africa (1)
- Spain (2)
- Sweden (1)
- Ukraine (2)
- United States (8)

== Medal table ==
Rank	Nation	Gold	Silver	Bronze	Total
1	Russia	3	0	1	4
2	Bulgaria	2	0	0	2
3	Ukraine	1	0	0	1
4	Great Britain	0	2	1	3
5	Belarus	0	1	1	2
6	Australia	0	1	0	1
6	Portugal	0	1	0	1
6	South Africa	0	1	0	1
9	Belgium	0	0	1	1
9	Germany	0	0	1	1
9	Japan	0	0	1	1
Totals (11 entries)		6	6	6	18

== Events ==
=== Men's events ===
Event	Gold	Silver	Bronze
Synchronized trampoline	Russia; Alexander Moskalenko; German Khnychev	Belarus; Mikalai Kazak; Vladimir Kakorka	Japan; Takayuki Kawanishi; Daisuke Nakata
Double-mini trampoline	Radostin Rachev; Bulgaria	Diogo Faria; Portugal	Uwe Marquardt; Germany
Tumbling	Levon Petrosian; Russia	Tseko Mogotsi; South Africa	Rob Small; Great Britain

=== Women's events ===
Event	Gold	Silver	Bronze
Synchronized trampoline	Ukraine; Oxana Tsyhuleva; Olena Movchan	Great Britain; Kirsten Lawton; Claire Wright	Russia; Irina Karavayeva; Natalia Chernova
Double-mini trampoline	Teodora Sinilkova; Bulgaria	Jacinta Harford; Australia	Ilse Despriet; Belgium
Tumbling	Elena Bluyina; Russia	Kathryn Peberdy; Great Britain	Anna Terenya; Belarus
