= Trampoline gymnastics at the 2001 World Games – Men's synchronized trampoline =

Men's synchronized trampoline at the World Games
- Venue: Akita City Gymnasium
- Date: 20–21 August 2001
- Competitors: 22 from 11 nations

Medalists
1st place, gold medalist(s)		Alexander Moskalenko; German Khnychev
2nd place, silver medalist(s)		Mikalai Kazak; Vladimir Kakorka
3rd place, bronze medalist(s)		Takayuki Kawanishi; Daisuke Nakata

The men's synchronized trampoline competition in trampoline gymnastics at the 2001 World Games took place from 20 to 21 August 2001 at the Akita City Gymnasium in Akita, Japan.

== Competition format ==
A total of 11 pairs entered the competition. Best eight duets from preliminary round qualifies to the final.

== Results ==
=== Preliminary ===
Rank	Athlete	Nation	Round 1	Round 2	Total	Note
1	Alexander Moskalenko; German Khnychev	Russia	38.60	50.90	89.50	Q
2	Mikalai Kazak; Vladimir Kakorka	Belarus	38.60	50.70	89.30	Q
3	Stefan Reithofer; Michael Serth	Germany	37.90	49.50	87.40	Q
4	Sebastien Laifa; Michael Jala	France	37.90	49.50	87.40	Q
5	Takayuki Kawanishi; Daisuke Nakata	Japan	37.50	49.40	86.90	Q
6	Lee Brearley; Paull Smyth	(United Kingdom) Great Britain	37.10	49.40	86.50	Q
7	Peter Jensen; Mats Jorgensen	Denmark	37.20	47.90	85.10	Q
8	Nic Marlin; Peter Dodd	United States	35.30	45.70	81.00	Q
9	Jonathon Dore; Damian Ryan	Australia	35.30	44.00	79.30	
10	Asier Zumeta; Javier Guerrero	Spain	36.50	31.90	68.40	
11	Nuno Merino; Amadeu Neves	Portugal	36.40	19.50	55.90	

=== Final ===
Rank	Athlete	Nation	Score
1st place, gold medalist(s)	Alexander Moskalenko; German Khnychev	Russia	51.90
2nd place, silver medalist(s)	Mikalai Kazak; Vladimir Kakorka	Belarus	50.60
3rd place, bronze medalist(s)	Takayuki Kawanishi; Daisuke Nakata	Japan	50.40
4	Sebastien Laifa; Michael Jala	France	50.10
5	Peter Jensen; Mats Jorgensen	Denmark	47.00
6	Nic Marlin; Peter Dodd	United States	44.70
7	Lee Brearley; Paull Smyth	(United Kingdom) Great Britain	44.40
8	Stefan Reithofer; Michael Serth	Germany	15.30
