= 1998 Trampoline World Championships =

The 20th Trampoline World Championships were held in Sydney, Australia from 9 October to 11 October 1998.

== Results ==
=== Men ===
==== Trampoline Individual ====
Rank	Country	Gymnast	Points
Gold medal	Russia	German Knytchev	109.2
Silver medal	Belarus	Nikolai Kazak	109.0
=	Belarus	Eugeni Beliaev	108.1
=	France	Emmanuel Durand	108.1
5	Russia	Alexandr Russakov	107.9
6	Great Britain	Paull Smyth	103.6
7	Germany	Stefan Reithofer	103.2
8	Canada	Chris Mitruk	102.5

==== Trampoline Team ====
Rank	Country	Gymnasts	Points
Gold medal	Russia	Alexander Russakov; German Knytchev; Alexander Moskalenko; Michail Tchepilevski	122.50
Silver medal	Belarus	Vladimir Kakorko; Nikolai Kazak; Eugueni Beliaev; Oleg Bondarik	119.30
Bronze medal	France	Sebastian Laifa; Guillaume Bourgeon; David Martin; Emmanuel Durand	118.8
4	Germany	Michael Serth; Markus Kubicka; Thorsten Windusch; Stefan Reithofer	112.10
5	Ukraine	Zhan Yordanov; Sergei Bukhovtsev; Olexander Chernonos	79.60

==== Trampoline Synchro ====
Rank	Country	Gymnasts	Points
Gold medal	France	David Martin; Emmanuel Durand	134.40
Silver medal	Belarus	Nikolai Kazak; Vladimir Kakorko	132.50
Bronze medal	Ukraine	Sergei Bukovtsev; Olexander Chernonos	130.50
4	Germany	Michael Serth; Stefan Reithofer	128.60
5	Denmark	Mads Sejerøe; Mads Ledstrup	127.20
6	Japan	Daisuke Nakata; Keita Sugai	126.40
7	Russia	Aleksandr Moskalenko; German Knychev	124.20
8	Great Britain	Brian Camp; Daniel Neale	123.40

==== Double Mini Trampoline ====
Rank	Country	Gymnast	Points
Gold medal	Brazil	Rodolfo Rangel	24.88
Silver medal	Portugal	Joao Marques	24.13
Bronze medal	Canada	Chris Mitruk	23.20
4	Canada	Jeremy Brock	22.60
=5	Spain	Jaime Castillejo	22.33
=5	Australia	Paul Hadfield	22.33
7	Portugal	Diogo Faria	22.20
8	Bulgaria	Radostin Ratchev	21.29

==== Double Mini Trampoline Team ====
Rank	Country	Gymnasts	Points
Gold medal	New Zealand	Tom Delany; Justin Dougal; Chris Ormandy; Damien McCown	36.27
Silver medal	Canada	Chris Mitruk; Jeremy Brock; Ben Snape; Israel Martens	35.05
Bronze medal	Australia	Ji Wallace; Adrian Wareham; Karl Shore; Paul Hadfield	34.72
4	Brazil	Rodolfo Rangel; Rodrigo Rodrigues; Cicero Macedo; Rogerio Troian	34.53
5	United States	Karl Heger; Mark Griffith; Brian Beech; Byron Smith	34.13

==== Tumbling ====
Rank	Country	Gymnast	Points
Gold medal	Russia	Levon Petrosian	86.03
Silver medal	Russia	Daniel Avakian	83.30
Bronze medal	Poland	Tomasz Kies	80.56
4	Portugal	Luis Nunes	79.80
5	France	Alexandre Dechanet	79.60
6	France	Nicolas Fournials	78.67
7	Portugal	Sergio Morais	77.47
8	South Africa	Tseko Mogotsi	73.90

==== Tumbling Team ====
Rank	Country	Gymnasts	Points
Gold medal	Russia	Daniel Avakian; Levon Petrosian; Oleg Akinchine; Eugeni Bogomolov	86.60
Silver medal	United States	Rayshine Harris; Brian Beech; Brad Davis; Graylan Stewart	77.47
Bronze medal	France	Nicolas Fournials; Alexandre Dechanet; Joseph Imbert; Christopher Gigou	77.20
4	Denmark	Martin J. Nielsen; Flemming Johansen; Rune Kristensen	75.80
5	Portugal	Luis Nunes; Sergio Nascimento; Eduardo Mendes; Sergio Morais	75.43

=== Women ===
==== Trampoline Individual ====
Rank	Country	Gymnast	Points
Gold medal	Russia	Irina Karavaeva	104.6
Silver medal	Ukraine	Oxana Tsyhuleva	103.5
Bronze medal	Germany	Anna Dogonadze-Lilkendey	102.5
4	Georgia	Rusudan Khoperia	100.9
5	Canada	Karen Cockburn	100.5
=6	Great Britain	Claire Wright	99.60
=6	Belarus	Natalia Karpenkova	99.60
8	Belarus	Galina Lebedeva	99.00

==== Trampoline Team ====
Rank	Country	Gymnasts	Points
Gold medal	Russia	Irina Karavaeva; Natalia Chernova; Marina Mourinova; Tatiana Kovaleva	112.30
Silver medal	Belarus	Galina Lebedeva; Liudmila Padasenko; Natalia Karpenkova; Tatsiana Piatrenia	110.10
Bronze medal	Ukraine	Oxana Tsyhuleva; Larisa Khreschik; Elena Movchan; Oxana Verbitskaya	108.2
4	Canada	Karen Cockburn; Marianne Saint-Jacques; Heather Ross-McManus; Lydia Zanon	107.60
5	Great Britain	Claire Wright; Kirsten Lawton; Jaime Moore; Ellie Dixon-Jackson	107.00

==== Trampoline Synchro ====
Rank	Country	Gymnasts	Points
Gold medal	Tina Ludwig; Anna Dogonadze-Lilkendey	Germany	130.10
Silver medal	Oksana Tsyhuleva; Olena Movchan	Ukraine	129.10
Bronze medal	Natalia Chernova; Tatiana Kovaleva	Russia	126.40
4	Natalia Karpenkova; Galina Lebedeva	Belarus	124.50
5	Sylwia Durlik; Marta Kubiak	Poland	124.20
6	Hiromi Hammoto; Akiko Horiuchi	Japan	121.40
7	Magali Trouche; Karine Pallanche	France	120.80
8	Lydia Zanon; Karen Cockburn	Canada	120.00

==== Double Mini Trampoline ====
Rank	Country	Gymnast	Point
Gold medal	New Zealand	Kylie Walker	21.86
Silver medal	United States	Jennifer Parilla	21.40
Bronze medal	Bulgaria	Teodora Sinilkowa	21.27
4	Australia	Jacinta Harford	21.20
5	Belgium	Saskia Demeyer	20.86
6	Canada	Lisa Colussi	20.73
7	Germany	Irina Mut	20.54
8	United States	Tara Sewell	16.10

==== Double Mini Trampoline Team ====
Rank	Country	Gymnasts	Points
Gold medal	New Zealand	Kylie Walker; Rebecca Winstone; Katrina Moodie; Sarah Bradnock	31.74
Silver medal	Australia	Lauren Gillett; Elizabeth Cox; Jackie Cully; Jacinta Harford	31.60
Bronze medal	United States	Jennifer Parilla; Tara Sewell; Betsy Pottorff; Gina Trapane	31.13
4	Canada	Lisa Colussi; Cheryl Johnson; Erin Arnason; Joanne Gaumont	30.19
5	Russia	Tatiana Kovaleva; Irina Vassilieva; Marina Mourinova	28.89

==== Tumbling ====
Rank	Country	Gymnast	Points
Gold medal	Russia	Elena Bloujina	77.53
Silver medal	United States	Amanda Lentz	75.80
Bronze medal	France	Chrystel Robert	75.00
4	France	Karine Boucher	73.84
5	Russia	Tatiana Chakhnovskaia	72.47
6	United States	Lajeanna Davis	71.07
7	Canada	Karen Stevens	
8	Portugal	Tania Santos	

==== Tumbling Team ====
Rank	Country	Gymnasts	Points
Gold medal	Russia	Elena Bloujina; Tatiana Chakhnovskaia; Anna Korobeinkova	75.86
Silver medal	France	Chrystel Robert; Marlene Bayet; Melanie Avisse; Karine Boucher	74.94
Bronze medal	United States	Amanda Lentz; Kendra Stucki; Lajeanna Davis; Erin Maguire	71.97
4	Great Britain	Kathryn Peberdy; Melanie Thompson; Leigh Rugman; Zoe Styles	68.06
5	Canada	Karen Stevens; Christy Jeanes; Julie Hurst; Iyana Gardner	66.40
