= Huang Shanshan =

Chinese trampoline gymnast

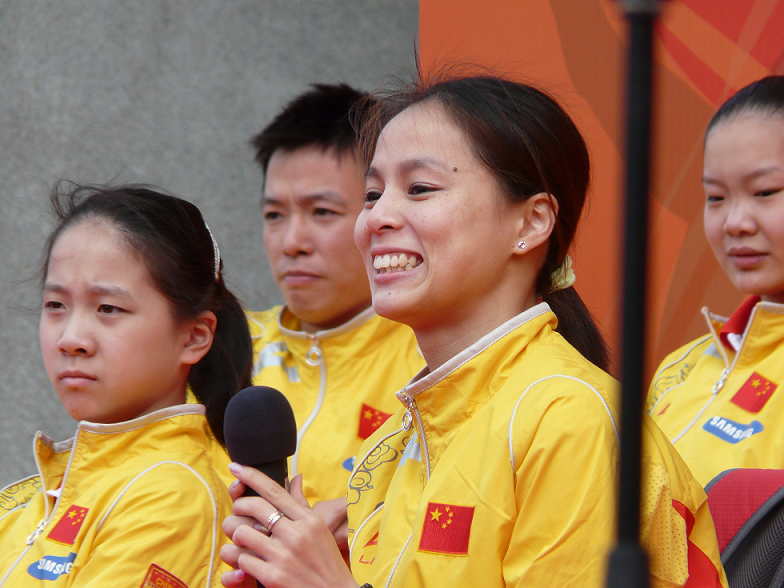
- Huang Shanshan at Hong Kong Polytechnic University

Personal information
- Born: 18 January 1986 (age 40) Fuzhou, Fujian
- Height: 157 cm (5 ft 2 in)

Gymnastics career
- Discipline: Trampoline gymnastics
- Country represented: China
Medal record
Women's trampoline gymnastics
Representing China
Olympic Games
Silver medal – second place	2012 London	Individual
Bronze medal – third place	2004 Athens	Individual
World Championships
Gold medal – first place	2005 Eindhoven	Team
Gold medal – first place	2007 Quebec	Team
Gold medal – first place	2009 St. Petersburg	Team
Gold medal – first place	2009 St. Petersburg	Individual
Gold medal – first place	2011 Birmingham	Team
Silver medal – second place	2003 Hannover	Team
Silver medal – second place	2007 Quebec	Individual
Silver medal – second place	2010 Metz	Individual
Asian Games
Gold medal – first place	2006 Doha	Individual
Gold medal – first place	2010 Guangzhou	Individual

Huang Shanshan (simplified Chinese: 黄珊汕; traditional Chinese: 黃珊汕; pinyin: Huáng Shānshàn; born 18 January 1986) is a Chinese former trampoline gymnast who won bronze in the individual competition at the 2004 Summer Olympics and silver at the 2012 Summer Olympics. She is the 2009 World individual champion and a four-time team World champion. Additionally, she is a two-time Asian Games individual champion.

== Gymnastics career ==
Huang began trampoline gymnastics when she was four years old and was selected for the national team in 2002. She won her first World Championships medal in 2003 as part of the Chinese team that finished second to Russia. Additionally, she advanced to the individual final in third place but finished eighth after a fall in the final. This marked the first time a Chinese athlete advanced into the individual final at the Trampoline Gymnastics World Championships. She represented China at the 2004 Summer Olympics and qualified for the final in fourth place. She went on to win the bronze medal in the final, behind Anna Dogonadze and Karen Cockburn.

At the 2005 World Championships, Huang won a gold medal in the team competition, and she finished eighth in the individual final. She won the gold medal at the 2006 Asian Games by 0.100 points ahead of teammate Zhong Xingping. She won an individual silver medal at the 2007 World Championships, behind Russia's Irina Karavayeva. There, she also won a gold medal in the team competition. At the 2008 Summer Olympics, she failed to advance to the finals due to a fall in the qualification round.

Huang won the individual event at the 2009 Salzgitter World Cup. She won the qualification round at the 2009 National Games of China but ultimately won the bronze medal after performing a less difficult routine in the final. She helped China defend its team title at the 2009 World Championships. Then in the individual final, she won the gold medal by 0.100 points ahead of teammate He Wenna.

At the 2010 Asian Games, Huang successfully defended her individual title.. At the 2010 World Championships, she won the individual silver medal to teammate Li Dan. She won a gold medal with the Chinese team at the 2011 World Championships. She represented China at the 2012 Summer Olympics and won the silver medal, behind Rosie MacLennan. She announced her retirement after the Olympics concluded to focus on her education.
