= Oxana Tsyhuleva =

Ukrainian trampoline gymnast

- Full name: Oxana Mykolayivna Tsyhuleva
- Alternative names: Oksana Tsyhulova, Oxana Tsiguleva
- Born: 15 December 1973 (age 52) Mykolaiv, Ukrainian SSR, Soviet Union

Gymnastics career
- Discipline: Trampoline gymnastics
- Country represented: Ukraine
Medal record
Representing Ukraine
Event	1st	2nd	3rd
Olympic Games	0	1	0
World Championships	4	6	2
European Championships	1	1	4
World Games	2	0	0
Goodwill Games	0	0	1
Total	7	8	7
Olympic Games
Silver medal – second place	2000 Sydney	Individual
World Championships
Gold medal – first place	1996 Vancouver	Synchro
Gold medal – first place	1999 Sun City	Synchro
Gold medal – first place	2001 Odense	Team
Gold medal – first place	2001 Odense	Synchro
Silver medal – second place	1994 Porto	Team
Silver medal – second place	1996 Vancouver	Team
Silver medal – second place	1998 Sydney	Individual
Silver medal – second place	1998 Sydney	Synchro
Silver medal – second place	1999 Sun City	Individual
Silver medal – second place	1999 Sun City	Team
Bronze medal – third place	1994 Porto	Synchro
Bronze medal – third place	1998 Sydney	Team
World Games
Gold medal – first place	1997 Lahti	Synchro
Gold medal – first place	2001 Akita	Synchro
European Championships
Gold medal – first place	1993 Sursee	Synchro
Silver medal – second place	1993 Sursee	Team
Bronze medal – third place	1997 Eindhoven	Individual
Bronze medal – third place	1997 Eindhoven	Team
Bronze medal – third place	1998 Dessau	Individual
Bronze medal – third place	2000 Eindhoven	Individual
Goodwill Games
Bronze medal – third place	2001 Brisbane	Individual

Oxana Mykolayivna Tsyhuleva (Ukrainian: Оксана Миколаївна Цигульова; born 15 December 1973) is a Ukrainian trampolinist who won a silver medal at the 2000 Summer Olympics.

== Career ==
Tsyhuleva competed at her first World Championships in 1996 in Vancouver. She won the gold medal in the synchro competition with Olena Movchan and Ukraine won the team silver medal behind Russia. At the 1998 World Championships in Sydney, she won the silver medal in the individual event behind Russia's Irina Karavayeva. Ukraine won the team bronze medal behind Russia and Belarus. She also won the silver medal in the synchro competition with Olena Movchan behind German trampolinists Tina Ludwig and Anna Dogonadze.

At the 1999 World Championships in Sun City, South Africa, Tsyhuleva once again won the silver medal in the individual event behind Irina Karavayeva. The Ukrainian team of Tsyhuleva, Olena Movchan, and Oxana Verbitskaya won the silver medal behind Russia. She reclaimed her synchro World title with Movchan.

Tsyhuleva was selected to represent Ukraine at the 2000 Summer Olympics for the inaugural Olympic trampoline competition. She qualified for the women's individual trampoline event in third place. In the final, she won the silver medal behind Irina Karavayeva.

Tsyhuleva competed at the 2001 World Championships in Odense, Denmark. She finished eighth in the individual competition. She won the team gold medal alongside Yulia Domshevsky, Olena Movchan, and Oxana Pochynok, and she once again won the synchro gold medal with Olena Movchan. She then competed at the 2001 World Games in Akita, Japan. She won the gold medal with Olena Movchan in the synchronized trampoline event.
