= 1992 Trampoline World Championships =

- Location: Auckland, New Zealand
- Start date: 1 October 1992
- End date: 11 October 1992

The 17th Trampoline World Championships were held in Auckland, New Zealand.

== Medal summary ==
Event	Gold	Silver	Bronze
Men
Individual	Alexander Moskalenko (RUS)	Michael Kuhn (GER)	Adrian Wareham (AUS)
Individual Team	Russia; Alexander Moskalenko; German Knytchev; Alexander Danilchenko; Andrei Alexienko	France; Fabrice Hennique; Jean-Pierre Thorn; Fabrice Schwertz; Denis Passemard	Germany; Michael Kuhn; Christian Kemmer; Christoff Emmes; Martin Kubicka
Synchro	Russia; Alexander Moskalenko; Alexander Danilchenko	Denmark; John Hansen; Anders Christiansen	Russia; Guerman Knychev; Andrei Alexienko
Double Mini	Jorge Pereira (POR)	Steffen Eislöffel (GER)	Jeremy Brock (CAN)
Double Mini Team	Germany; Jörg Gehrke; Steffen Eislöffel; Pascual Robles; Heiko Berger	Portugal; Joao Ferreira; Jorge Moreira; Luis Nunes; Jorge Pereira	Canada; Daniel Chretien; Jeremy Brock; Allister Booth; Michel Greene
Tumbling	Jon Beck (USA)	Krzysztof Wilusz (POL)	Marcin Leszcaniecki (POL)
Tumbling Team	United States; Rayshine Harris; Jon Beck; Brad Davis; Don Rice	Poland; Krzysztof Wilusz; Marcin Leszcaniecki; Radoslaw Walczak; Tomasz Kies	Portugal; Sergio Nascimento; Luis Nunes; Francisco Pinto; Nuno Pereira
Women
Individual	Elena Merkulova (RUS)	Tatiana Lushina (RUS)	Sue Challis (GBR)
Individual Team	Great Britain; Andrea Holmes; Sue Challis; Samantha Tenn; Lorraine Lyon	Germany; Tina Ludwig; Hiltrud Roewe; Sandra Beck; Bafke Spang	France; Natalie Treil; Alice Besseige; Christelle Guidicelli; Magali Trouche
Synchro	Great Britain; Lorraine Lyon; Andrea Holmes	Germany; Hiltrud Roewe; Tina Ludwig	Netherlands; Inke van Braak; Babette van de Wetering
Double Mini	Kylie Walker (NZL)	Donna White (AUS)	Robyn Forbes (AUS)
Double Mini Team	New Zealand; Kylie Walker; Alana Boulton; Paula O'Gorman; Kristen Glover	Belgium; Natacha Bacque; Katy Claerhout; Saskia Demeyer; Sigy van Renterghem	Australia; Robyn Forbes; Donna White; Jackie Cully; Natalie Abreu
Tumbling	Chrystel Robert (FRA)	Kendra Stucki (USA)	Michelle Mara (USA)
Tumbling Team	France; Chrystel Robert; Christelle Giroud; Corinne Robert	United States; Michelle Mara; Kendra Stucki; Shannon Mogolis; Emily Giglio	Belgium; Anneleen Warmoes; Sigy Van Renterghem; Mireille Meermans; Patricia Nolf

== Medal table ==
* Host nation (New Zealand)

Rank	Nation	Gold	Silver	Bronze	Total
1	Russia	4	1	1	6
2	United States	2	2	1	5
3	France	2	1	1	4
4	Great Britain	2	0	1	3
5	New Zealand*	2	0	0	2
6	Germany	1	4	1	6
7	Portugal	1	1	1	3
8	Poland	0	2	1	3
9	Australia	0	1	3	4
10	Belgium	0	1	1	2
11	Denmark	0	1	0	1
12	Canada	0	0	2	2
13	Netherlands	0	0	1	1
Totals (13 entries)		14	14	14	42

== Results ==
=== Men ===
==== Trampoline Individual ====
Rank	Country	Gymnast	Points
Gold medal	Russia	Alexander Moskalenko	108.70
Silver medal	Germany	Michael Kuhn	99.90
Bronze medal	Australia	Adrian Wareham	96.50
4	France	Jean-Pierre Thorn	95.80
5	Germany	Christian Kemmer	95.50
6	France	Fabrice Hennique	95.30
7	Canada	Paul Cameron	94.80
8	Japan	Takuya Fukui	94.20

==== Trampoline Team ====
Rank	Country	Gymnasts	Points
Gold medal	Russia	Alexander Moskalenko; German Knytchev; Alexander Danilchenko; Andrei Alexienko	192.60
Silver medal	France	Fabrice Hennique; Jean-Pierre Thorn; Fabrice Schwertz; Denis Passemard	188.30
Bronze medal	Germany	Michael Kuhn; Christian Kemmer; Christoff Emmes; Martin Kubicka	187.00
4	Canada	Paul Cameron; Michel Greene; Chris Mitruk; Jean-Paul Aucoin	183.00
5	Australia	Adrian Wareham; Michael Johnston; Paul Saynor; Steve Bland	177.20

==== Trampoline Synchro ====
Rank	Country	Gymnasts
Gold medal	Russia	Alexander Moskalenko; Alexander Danilchenko
Silver medal	Denmark	John Hansen; Anders Christiansen
Bronze medal	Russia	Guerman Knychev; Andrei Alexienko
4	France	Jean-Pierre Thorn; Denis Passemard
5	Australia	Michael Johnston; Adrian Wareham
6	Canada	Jean-Pierre Aucoin; Paul Cameron
7	Germany	Christof Emmes; Ralf Gehrke
8	France	Fabrice Hennique; Fabrice Schwertz

==== Double Mini Trampoline ====
Rank	Country	Gymnast
Gold medal	Portugal	Jorge Pereira
Silver medal	Germany	Steffen Eislöffel
Bronze medal	Canada	Jeremy Brock
4	Australia	Adrian Wareham
5	Canada	Michel Greene
6	Portugal	Joao Ferreira
7	Germany	Jörg Gehrke
8	New Zealand	Tom Delany

==== Double Mini Trampoline Team ====
Rank	Country	Gymnasts	Points
Gold medal	Germany	Jörg Gehrke; Steffen Eislöffel; Pascual Robles; Heiko Berger	50.80
Silver medal	Portugal	Joao Ferreira; Jorge Moreira; Luis Nunes; Jorge Pereira	50.47
Bronze medal	Canada	Daniel Chretien; Jeremy Brock; Allister Booth; Michel Greene	50.30
4	New Zealand	Tom Delany; Les Unkovich; Clark Eddington; Darren Fitch	48.00
5	Australia	Darren Gillis; Adrian Wareham; Steve Bland; Michael Johnston	47.80

==== Tumbling ====
Rank	Country	Gymnast
Gold medal	United States	Jon Beck
Silver medal	Poland	Krzysztof Wilusz
Bronze medal	Poland	Marcin Leszcaniecki
4	United States	Rayshine Harris
5	United States	Brad Davis
6	Poland	Tomasz Kies
7	France	Christophe Freroux
8	United States	Don Rice

==== Tumbling Team ====
Rank	Country	Gymnasts	Points
Gold medal	United States	Rayshine Harris; Jon Beck; Brad Davis; Don Rice	201.36
Silver medal	Poland	Krzysztof Wilusz; Marcin Leszcaniecki; Radoslaw Walczak; Tomasz Kies	199.60
Bronze medal	Portugal	Sergio Nascimento; Luis Nunes; Francisco Pinto; Nuno Pereira	187.85
4	Canada	Jeffrey Gallant; Michael Rosenberger; Steve Grannary; Keith McDonald	184.84
5	South Africa	Tseko Mogotsi; Sean McDonald; Dion Vorster	177.09

=== Women ===
==== Trampoline Individual ====
Rank	Country	Gymnast
Gold medal	Russia	Elena Merkulova
Silver medal	Russia	Tatiana Lushina
Bronze medal	Great Britain	Sue Challis
4	Germany	Hiltrud Roewe
5	Great Britain	Lorraine Lyon
6	Denmark	Majka Sand
7	Belarus	Lilia Shvalbo
8	Germany	Tina Ludwig

==== Trampoline Team ====
Rank	Country	Gymnasts	Points
Gold medal	Great Britain	Andrea Holmes; Sue Challis; Samantha Tenn; Lorraine Lyon	187.80
Silver medal	Germany	Tina Ludwig; Hiltrud Roewe; Sandra Beck; Bafke Spang	180.80
Bronze medal	France	Natalie Treil; Alice Besseige; Christelle Guidicelli; Magali Trouche	174.90
4	Japan	Akiko Furu; Masami Nishikawa; Rumiko Fukui; Narumi Sakano	171.95
5	Canada	Heather Ross; Franny Jewett; Catherine Worley; Kirsten Coke	171.50

==== Trampoline Synchro ====
Rank	Country	Gymnasts
Gold medal	Great Britain	Lorraine Lyon; Andrea Holmes
Silver medal	Germany	Hiltrud Roewe; Tina Ludwig
Bronze medal	Netherlands	Inke van Braak; Babette van de Wetering
4	Australia	Donna White; Jackie Cully
5	Australia	Sallyann Proposch; K Stephens
6	New Zealand	Kylie Walker; Tracy Bathgate
7	United States	Jennifer Sans; Christie Hayes
8	Germany	Sandra Beck; Gabi Dreier

==== Double Mini Trampoline ====
Rank	Country	Gymnast
Gold medal	New Zealand	Kylie Walker
Silver medal	Australia	Donna White
Bronze medal	Australia	Robyn Forbes
4	New Zealand	Alana Boulton
5	Belgium	Natacha Bacque
6	New Zealand	Kristen Glover
7	United States	Karrin Helm
8	Canada	Moya Brown

==== Double Mini Trampoline Team ====
Rank	Country	Gymnasts	Points
Gold medal	New Zealand	Kylie Walker; Alana Boulton; Paula O'Gorman; Kristen Glover	44.00
Silver medal	Belgium	Natacha Bacque; Katy Claerhout; Saskia Demeyer; Sigy van Renterghem	41.50
Bronze medal	Australia	Robyn Forbes; Donna White; Jackie Cully; Natalie Abreu	39.60
4	United States	Jennifer Sans; Karen Vandemeer; Karrin Helm; Jaime Strandmark	38.80
5	Canada	Moya Brown; Kirsten Coke; Devena Ratcliffe; Sheena Teiffel	31.40

==== Tumbling ====
Rank	Country	Gymnast
Gold medal	France	Chrystel Robert
Silver medal	United States	Kendra Stucki
Bronze medal	United States	Michelle Mara
4	France	Corinne Robert
5	Canada	Gillian Boyd
6	Belgium	Mireille Meermans
7	Australia	Elisabeth Hezlop
8	Australia	Lisa Cullen

==== Tumbling Team ====
Rank	Country	Gymnasts	Points
Gold medal	France	Chrystel Robert; Christelle Giroud; Corinne Robert	187.03
Silver medal	United States	Michelle Mara; Kendra Stucki; Shannon Mogolis; Emily Giglio	184.24
Bronze medal	Belgium	Anneleen Warmoes; Sigy Van Renterghem; Mireille Meermans; Patricia Nolf	180.86
4	Canada	Tammy Trasher; Karen Stevens; Stacey Woluschuk; Gillian Boyd	178.45
5	Australia	Nikki Ahrens; Hayley Diplock; Elisabeth Hezlop; Lisa Cullen	176.97
