= Vitaly Dubko =

Soviet-Russian trampolining coach (1936–2023)

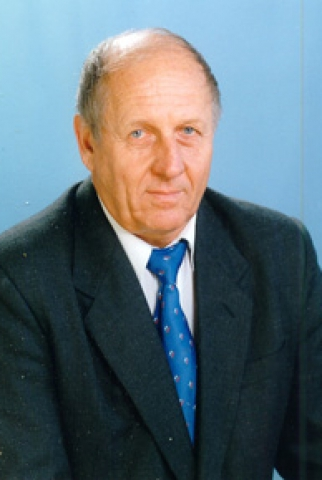
- Dubko in 2001
- Born: Vitaly Fyodorovich Dubko; 13 May 1936; Krasnodar, Russian SFSR, USSR
- Died: 19 September 2023 (aged 87)
- Education: Kuban State University
- Occupation: Trampolining coach

Vitaly Fyodorovich Dubko (Russian: Виталий Фёдорович Дубко; 13 May 1936 – 19 September 2023) was a Russian trampolining coach. He was also Vice-President of the Russian Trampolining Federation.

Dubko coached numerous Russian champions, such as Alexander Moskalenko, Irina Karavayeva, Natalia Chernova, and others at the 2000 and 2004 Summer Olympics.

In 2000, Dubko was named best trampolining coach of the 20th Century by the International Gymnastics Federation. In 2001, he was named to the Order of Honour.

Vitaly Dubko died on 19 September 2023, at the age of 87.
