= 1990 Trampoline World Championships =

The 16th Trampoline World Championships were held in Essen, Germany from 11 to 13 October 1990, only a few days after reunification of Germany.

== Results ==
=== Men ===
==== Trampoline Individual ====
Rank	Country	Gymnast	Points
Gold medal	Soviet Union	Alexander Moskalenko	107.40
Silver medal	Soviet Union	Dmitri Poliaroush	105.80
Bronze medal	West Germany	Michael Kuhn	104.20
4	Denmark	John Hansen	102.80
5	France	Fabrice Schwertz	102.10
6	West Germany	Ralf Pelle	100.60
7	West Germany	Bernd Leichert	100.20
8	Soviet Union	Zakkaria Abrahashivili	100.10

==== Trampoline Team ====
Rank	Country	Gymnasts	Points
Gold medal	Soviet Union	Alexander Moskalenko; Zakkaria Abrahashivili; Alexander Danilchenko; Dmitri Poliaroush	200.70
Silver medal	West Germany	Michael Kuhn; Bernd Leichert; Ralf Pelle; Christoff Emmes	193.50
Bronze medal	Denmark	John Hansen; Kjeld Rosén; Anders Christiansen; Michael Nielsen	189.80
4	Great Britain	Luke Porter; Kevin Young; Richard Cobbing; Ian Mallon	186.00
5	Poland	Waldemar Okoniesky; Eligiusz Skoczylas; Marek Haczkiewicz; Slawomir Milon	183.80

==== Trampoline Synchro ====
Rank	Country	Gymnasts
Gold medal	Soviet Union	Dmitri Poliaroush; Sergei Nestrelai
Silver medal	Soviet Union	Alexander Moskalenko; Alexander Danilchenko
Bronze medal	West Germany	Ralf Pelle; Micael Kuhn
4	France	Hubert Barthod; Fabrice Schwertz
5	Japan	Youzi Tachizaki; Takuya Fukui
6	Poland	Eligiusz Skoczylas; Waldemar Okoniewski/
7	Australia	Michael Johnston; Adrian Wareham
8	Canada	Jean-Paul Aucoin; Paul Cameron

==== Double Mini Trampoline ====
Rank	Country	Gymnast
Gold medal	Australia	Adrian Wareham
Silver medal	Portugal	Jorge Moreira
Bronze medal	West Germany	Steffen Eislöffel
4	United States	Karl Heger
5	Sweden	Ulf Andersson
6	Bulgaria	Pentcho Pentchev
7	Portugal	Joao Ferreira
8	Portugal	Jorge Pereira

==== Double Mini Trampoline Team ====
Rank	Country	Gymnasts
Gold medal	Australia	Darren Gillis; Adrian Wareham; Steve Bland; Michael Johnston
Silver medal	Portugal	Joao Ferreira; Jorge Moreira; Luis Nunes; Jorge Pereira
Bronze medal	West Germany	Jörg Gehrke; Steffen Eislöffel; Pascual Robles; Manfred Schwedler
4	Spain	Jaime Castillejo; Santiago Gomez-Valades; J. Ricardo Grajales; José Miguel Hernandez
5	United States	Tim Bilicic; Jon Beck; David Gross; Karl Heger

==== Tumbling ====
Rank	Country	Gymnast
Gold medal	France	Pascal Eouzan
Silver medal	United States	Jon Beck
Bronze medal	United States	Aaron Wilkins

==== Tumbling Team ====
Rank	Country	Gymnasts
Gold medal	France	
Silver medal	United States	
Bronze medal	Poland	

=== Women ===
==== Trampoline Individual ====
Rank	Country	Gymnast
Gold medal	Soviet Union	Elena Merkulova
Silver medal	Great Britain	Andrea Holmes
Bronze medal	Great Britain	Sue Challis
4	Soviet Union	Tatiana Lushina
5	Soviet Union	Elena Kolomeets
6	Soviet Union	Anna Dogonadze
7	West Germany	Sandra Siwinna
8	Great Britain	Lorraine Lyon

==== Trampoline Team ====
Rank	Country	Gymnasts
Gold medal	Soviet Union	Anna Dogonadze; Elena Kolomeets; Tatiana Lushina; Elena Merkulova
Silver medal	Great Britain	Andrea Holmes; Sue Challis; Sachelle Halford; Lorraine Lyon
Bronze medal	West Germany	Ivonne Kraft; Hiltrud Roewe; Sandra Siwinna; Gabi Bahr
4	France	Natalie Treil; Alice Besseige; Delphine Moreno; Magali Trouche
5	Canada	Heather Ross; Franny Jewett; Catherine Worley; Kirsten Coke

==== Trampoline Synchro ====
Rank	Country	Gymnasts
Gold medal	Soviet Union	Elena Merkulova; Tatiana Lushina
Silver medal	Soviet Union	Elena Kolomeets; Rusudan Khoperia
Bronze medal	West Germany	Sandra Siwinna; Gabi Dreier
4	Australia	Liz Jensen; Lisa Newman-Morris
5	Denmark	Majka Sand; Lisbet Michaelsen
6	Canada	Kirsten Coke; Catherine Worley
7	France	Alice Besseige; Nathalie Treil
8	Australia	Natalie Abrev; Robyn Forbes

==== Double Mini Trampoline ====
Rank	Country	Gymnast
Gold medal	Australia	Lisa Newman-Morris
=	Australia	Liz Jensen
=	New Zealand	Kylie Walker
4	West Germany	Renate Gehrke
5	Belgium	Sofie Van de Plassche
6=	Australia	Robyn Forbes
6=	New Zealand	Alana Boulton
8	West Germany	Martina Wiening

==== Double Mini Trampoline Team ====
Rank	Country	Gymnasts
Gold medal	New Zealand	Kylie Walker; Alana Boulton; Paula O'Gorman; Kristen Glover
Silver medal	Australia	Lisa Newman-Morris; Liz Jensen; Robyn Forbes; Natalie Abreu
Bronze medal	West Germany	Nicole Kruger; Stefanie Werner; Martina Wiening; Renate Gehrke
4	Belgium	Natacha Bacque; Katy Claerhout; Sofie Van de Plassche; Hilde van Dorpe
5	Canada	Nicole Liquorish; Kirsten Coke; Devena Ratcliffe; Nikki Saunders

==== Tumbling ====
Rank	Country	Gymnast
Gold medal	France	Chrystel Robert
Silver medal	France	Corinne Robert
Bronze medal	United States	Michelle Mara

==== Tumbling Team ====
Rank	Country	Gymnasts
Gold medal	France	
Silver medal	United States	
Bronze medal	Canada	Becky Howie; Stacey Woluschuk; Gillian Boyd; Jody Grey
