= Heather Ross-McManus =

Canadian trampoline gymnast

- Born: September 3, 1973 (age 53) Etobicoke, Ontario
- Height: 5 ft 1 in (155 cm)

Gymnastics career
- Discipline: Trampoline gymnastics
- Country represented: Canada
- Club: Spring Action Trampoline
- Head coach: Sean McManus
- Assistant coach: Yann Prigent
- Former coaches: Dave Ross, Ian Duffy, Ron Masotti, Lorne Singer, Kathy Handford
- Retired: 2005

Heather Ross-McManus (born September 3, 1973) is a Canadian retired trampoline gymnast. She placed 6th at the 2004 Summer Olympics and was part of the team that won bronze at the 2003 World Championships. She is now the director of the women's artistic gymnastics program for Gymnastics Canada.

== Gymnastics career ==
Ross-McManus began training in artistic gymnastics at age 7. However, she switched to trampolining at age 12 after a negative experience at a gymnastics school, where she said "I didn't feel they treated me as a human being." She first tried trampolining at a camp; on her second day at the camp, she fell from the trampoline and missed the landing mat, injuring her head. She was undeterred by the experience and eager to jump on the trampoline again.

In 1986, she competed in the age group competition for 11- and 12-year olds at the World Championships, where she placed 9th. The following year, at the Canadian Championships, she placed 3rd in the senior women's competition, then won silver in the senior synchro event with partner Franny Jewett. At only 13 years old, she was unusually young to be competitive at the senior level.

She competed at the 1988 World Championships and placed 26th. At the 1989 Canadian Championships, she once again won bronze in the individual competition and silver in synchro with Jewett. The next year, she won another bronze medal at the Canadian Championships and placed 18th at the 1990 World Championships.

Ross-McManus became the Canadian champion in 1991, performing the highest-ever difficulty by a Canadian women. She again finished second in the synchro competition with Jewett. The next year, she was third at the Canadian Championships. At the 1992 World Championships, she placed 14th in the individual event, the highest of the Canadian women competing there.

She retired after the World Championships. During her time away from competition, she was involved in other sports and studied cabinetry. In 1996, she reconnected with another former gymnast, Sean McManus, who owned a trampoline gym. They soon entered a romantic relationship and married in 1997.

Ross-McManus experienced a renewed interest in competing, and coached by her husband, she returned at the 1997 Canadian Championships, where she placed 6th. At the 1998 World Championships, she placed 36th. She initially struggled in her return to competition; at one World Cup event, she fell or discontinued three out of four routines. She attributed these problems to mental difficulties and a lack of confidence, and she improved after she started to see a sport psychologist.

In 2001, she tried competing in synchro with Karen Cockburn after the two were the only Canadian woman competing at FIG World Cup event. At the 2001 World Championships, she finished 10th individually. The Canadian team tied with the British team for 3rd, but Britain won the tiebreaker, leaving the Canadian team in 4th place.

The next year, she and Cockburn began to compete together officially after their usual synchro partners retired. Together, they won the Canadian Championships synchro title. At the World Cup stage held in Alberta, they won silver, having lost the gold by only 0.1 points. It was a personal best score for the pair, though Ross-McManus commented, "When it's that close you think back to every little thing you could have done just a bit better." In November, they won silver at the World Cup series final. Ross-McManus commented on her performance: "I got into some trouble and lost my height and Karen had to really make an adjustment to keep up with me. I thought for a moment I was going to land off the trampoline. Karen saved the routine and she's my hero right now."

At the 2003 World Championships, the Canadian team won the bronze medal. Individually, Cockburn won the World title, while Ross-McManus finished in 5th place; their results meant Canada could send two women to the upcoming 2004 Summer Olympics. Ross-McManus said she had spent a full year mentally preparing for the competition.

In March the next year, Ross-McManus competed at the 2004 Olympic test event in Athens, where she placed 12th. She finished second at the Canadian Championships, leading to her being selected for the Olympics. Ahead of the Olympics, she placed second behind Cockburn at a World Cup event where 13 of the 16 athletes who would be contesting the women's trampoline event competed. It was her best-ever placement on the World Cup series.

At the 2004 Summer Olympic Games, she qualified for the final and finished in 6th place. She expressed contentment with her placement, saying, "That was a really strong final; there were a lot of strong trampoliners there and I was just happy to be a part of that." At the end of the year, she competed at the Trampoline World Cup Final, held in Algiers, where she finished in 6th place in the individual competition and 4th in the synchronized competition with Cockburn.

== Post-gymnastics career ==
Ross-McManus ran Spring Action, a trampoline club, with her husband and coached gymnasts there while still competing. After retiring, she stayed involved in the sport of trampoline as a coach and judge. She and her husband have performed together at events since the mid-1990s. She has held developmental and high performance director positions for various gymnastics organizations in Canada, and in April 2026, she was appointed the director of the women's artistic gymnastics program for Gymnastics Canada.

== Personal life ==
Ross-McManus has two younger siblings. Her sister, Laurie, also competed in trampolining. She attended the Kingston Collegiate and Vocational Institute, then studied at Lakehead University.
