= Chrystel Robert =

French tumbling gymnast (born 1973)

- Born: 31 July 1973 (age 53) La Falaise
- Height: 160 cm (5 ft 3 in)

Gymnastics career
- Discipline: Tumbling
- Country represented: France
- Club: AC Ronchin
- Head coach: Christophe Lambert
- Retired: 2000
Medal record
Women's tumbling
Representing France
World Championships
Gold medal – first place	1990 Essen	Tumbling
Gold medal – first place	1990 Essen	Tumbling Team
Gold medal – first place	1992 Auckland	Tumbling
Gold medal – first place	1992 Auckland	Tumbling Team
Gold medal – first place	1994 Porto	Tumbling
Gold medal – first place	1994 Porto	Tumbling Team
Gold medal – first place	1996 Vancouver	Tumbling
Gold medal – first place	1996 Vancouver	Tumbling Team
Silver medal – second place	1988 Birmingham	Tumbling Team
Silver medal – second place	1998 Sydney	Tumbling Team
Silver medal – second place	1999 Sun City	Tumbling Team
Silver medal – second place	1999 Sun City	Tumbling
Bronze medal – third place	1998 Sydney	Tumbling
World Games
Gold medal – first place	1989 Karlsruhe	Tumbling
Gold medal – first place	1993 The Hague	Tumbling
Silver medal – second place	1997 Lahti	Tumbling

Chrystel Robert (born 31 July 1973) is a French tumbling gymnast. She is an eight-time world champion and three-time European champion.

From 1989 to 2000, Robert was the French national champion every year except 1997, when her teammate Karine Boucher won the title. She completed a grand slam in 1992 and 1993, winning all major titles: the 1992 IFSA and FIT world championships and the 1993 World Games.
