= Ross Menzies =

Scottish footballer (1934–2022)

Personal information
- Full name: Adam Ross Menzies
- Date of birth: 31 October 1934
- Place of birth: Rutherglen, Scotland
- Date of death: 3 September 2022 (aged 87)
- Place of death: Aberfeldy, Perthshire, Scotland
- Position: Wing half

Senior career*
| Years | Team | Apps | (Gls) |
| 1953–1954 | Armadale Thistle | | |
| 1954–1957 | Rangers | 0 | (0) |
| 1957–1960 | Cardiff City | 1 | (0) |
- Cheltenham Town
| Total | | 1 | (0) |

International career
- Scotland schools
- * Club domestic league appearances and goals

Adam Ross Menzies (31 October 1934 – 3 September 2022) was a Scottish professional footballer who played as a wing half.

== Career ==
Born in Rutherglen, Menzies began his career at Armadale Thistle in 1953. He then played for Rangers, making 3 Cup appearances in September 1954, before moving to Cardiff City in August 1957, for whom he made 1 Football League appearance. He then played for Cheltenham Town. Menzies also played for Scotland schools.

== Death ==
Menzies died in Aberfeldy, Perthshire on 3 September 2022, at the age of 87.
