= Gymnastics Canada =

Gymnastics governing body of Canada

- Sport: Gymnastics
- Membership: International Gymnastics Federation (FIG)
- Affiliation: Canadian Olympic Committee
- Headquarters: Ottawa
- Chairman: Petoit
- CEO: Previously: Ian Moss

Official website
- www.gymcan.org
- (Canada)

Gymnastics Canada is the national governing body for the sport of gymnastics in Canada and has its current headquarters in Ottawa, Ontario. It is responsible for the organization and promotion of gymnastics on a nationwide basis.

In 1956, a Canadian delegation attended its first world-level International Gymnastics Federation FIG (Fédération Internationale de Gymnastique) competition in Melbourne with only one male gymnast, Ed Gagnier, and one female gymnast, Ernestine Russell. This marked the beginning of Canada's participation in international competitions, signalling an important step towards development of their national team program.

In Canada, gymnastics is a part of the Canada Games programme. Gymnastics is said to have been originally practiced in ancient Greek civilization, evolving over time into a more structured form of exercise and recreation. Through running, jumping, swimming, throwing, wrestling and weightlifting exercises, gymnastics promotes physical strength as well as intellectual development by developing balance, coordination and rhythm.

== Controversy ==
In 2023, the McLaren Report sparked a move to change the leadership of the organization. Gymnastics Canada CEO Ian Moss left the organization while the board stated it would work together with him to ensure a "smooth transition" for the next CEO. Following the resignation of Jeff Thomson earlier in February 2023, the organization began searching for a new chairperson to lead its board of directors, an integral role for advancing and fulfilling its new mission objectives. Thomson was replaced by vice-chair Petoit on an interim basis.
