= Anna Dogonadze =

German trampoline gymnast

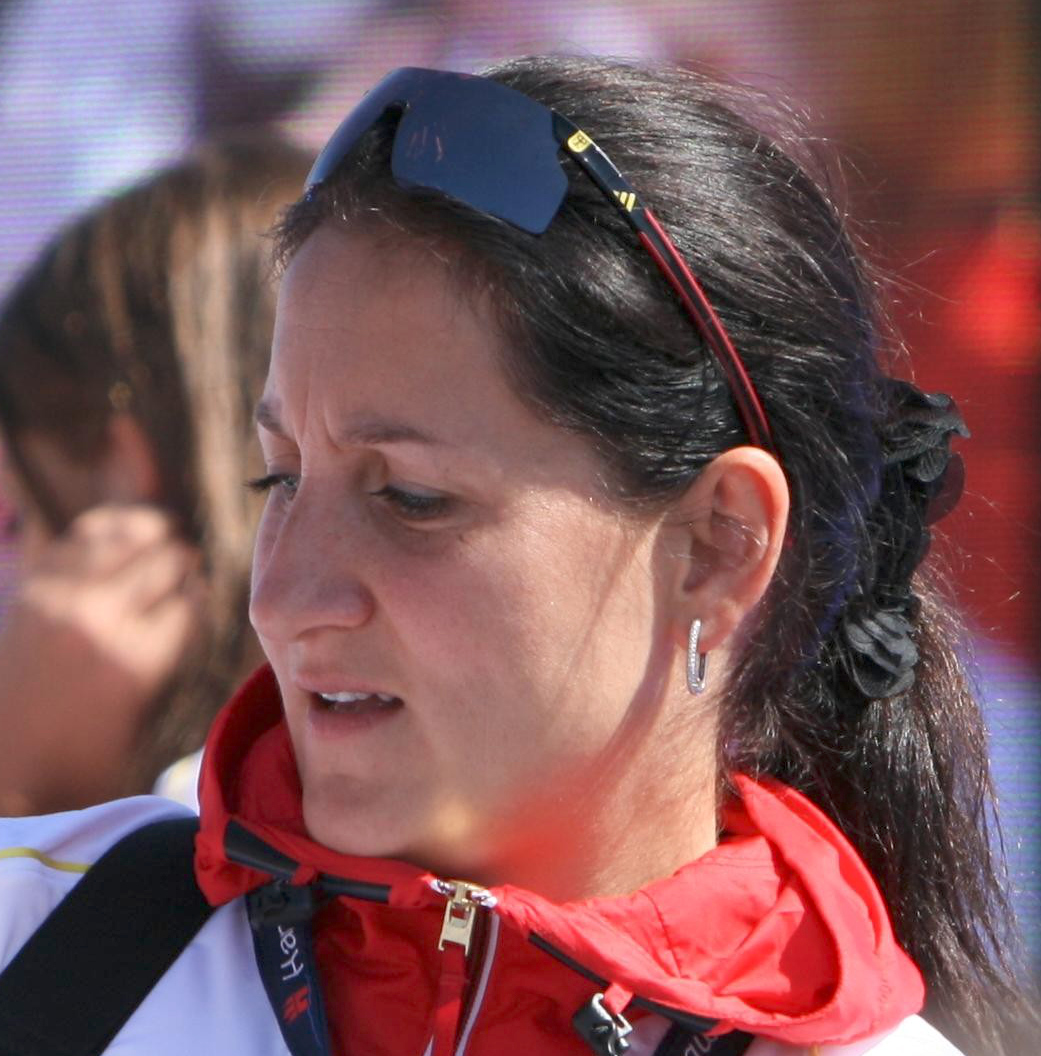
- Dogonadze in Hamburg, 2012

Personal information
- Full name: Anna Aleksandre Dogonadze
- Alternative name: Anna Dogonadze-Lilkendey
- Born: 15 February 1973 (age 53) Mtskheta, Georgian SSR, Soviet Union
- Height: 158 cm (5 ft 2 in)

Gymnastics career
- Discipline: Trampoline gymnastics
- Country represented: Germany
- Former countries represented: Soviet Union (Georgia (country)) Georgia
- Club: MTV Kreuznach
Medal record
Women's trampoline gymnastics
World Championships
Representing Soviet Union
| Gold medal – first place | 1990 Essen | Team |
Representing (Georgia (country)) Georgia
World Games
| Bronze medal – third place | 1997 Lahti | Individual |
World Cup Final
| Gold medal – first place | 1993 Frankfurt | Synchro |
| Bronze medal – third place | 1993 Frankfurt | Individual |
Representing Germany
Olympic Games
| Gold medal – first place | 2004 Athens | Individual |
World Games
| Gold medal – first place | 2005 Duisburg | Synchro |
World Championships
| Gold medal – first place | 1998 Sydney | Synchro |
| Gold medal – first place | 2001 Odense | Individual |
| Gold medal – first place | 2011 Birmingham | Synchro |
| Silver medal – second place | 1999 Sun City | Synchro |
| Silver medal – second place | 2001 Odense | Team |
| Silver medal – second place | 2001 Odense | Synchro |
| Silver medal – second place | 2010 Metz | Synchro |
| Bronze medal – third place | 1998 Sydney | Individual |
| Bronze medal – third place | 1999 Sun City | Individual |
| Bronze medal – third place | 2003 Hannover | Individual |
| Bronze medal – third place | 2003 Hannover | Synchro |
| Bronze medal – third place | 2005 Eindhoven | Individual |
| Bronze medal – third place | 2005 Eindhoven | Synchro |
World Cup Final
| Gold medal – first place | 2000 Dessau | Synchro |
| Silver medal – second place | 2006 Birmingham | Individual |
| Silver medal – second place | 2006 Birmingham | Synchro |
| Bronze medal – third place | 2000 Dessau | Individual |
| Bronze medal – third place | 2004 Alger | Individual |
| Bronze medal – third place | 2004 Alger | Synchro |

Anna Aleksandre Dogonadze (Georgian: ანა დოღონაძე; born 15 February 1973) is a Georgian-born trampoline gymnast who competed for the Soviet Union, Georgia, and Germany. She is the 2004 Olympic champion in individual trampoline, and she also competed at the 2000, 2008, and 2012 Summer Olympics. She is also a four-time World champion and a World Games champion.

== Gymnastics career ==
Dogonadze won a gold medal with the Soviet team at the 1990 World Championships, and she placed sixth in the individual events. She began competing for Georgia after the country's independence and won a gold medal in the synchro event at the 1993 World Cup Final. At the 1997 World Games, she won a bronze medal in the individual event.

Dogonadze moved to Germany in 1998 and became a German citizen following her marriage to her former coach, Axel Lilkendey. At the 1998 World Championships, she won a gold medal in the synchro event alongside Tina Ludwig. Additionally, she won the individual bronze medal, behind Irina Karavayeva and Oxana Tsyhuleva. She also finished third to Karavayeva and Tsyhuleva at the 1999 World Championships, and she won a silver medal in the synchro event.

Dogonadze competed at the 2000 Summer Olympics, the first Olympics to include trampoline. She qualified for the individual final in first place after winning the execution-score tiebreaker over the reigning World champion, Irina Karavayeva. She became sick before the final and placed last after falling off the trampoline. At the 2001 World Championships, she won her first individual world title and also won silver medals in the team and synchro competitions.

At the 2004 Summer Olympics, Dogonadze won the gold medal ahead of the reigning World champion, Karen Cockburn, thanks to a higher execution score. She won a gold medal in the synchro competition at the 2005 World Games alongside Jessica Simon. She won the individual title at the 2007 German Championships.

Dogonadze missed the beginning of the 2008 season due to a herniated disc. She advanced into the individual final at the 2008 Summer Olympics, but she fell in the final and placed last. At the 2010 Salzgitter World Cup, she placed seventh in the individual final, but she won the silver medal in the synchro event with Carina Baumgärtner.

Dogonadze placed sixth in the individual final at the 2011 World Championships and earned a berth to the 2012 Summer Olympics. Additionally, she won a gold medal with Simon in the synchro competition, Germany's first World synchro title since 1998. She competed at the 2012 Summer Olympics at the age of 39, but she did not advance into the final after placing 10th in the qualifications.

== Personal life ==
Dogonadze lived in Bad Kreuznach while representing Germany. She has one daughter. She has worked as a coach at the club she trained at– MTV Kreuznach. She was an ambassador for the 2019 World Championships, and she is an integration ambassador for the German Olympic Sports Confederation.

== See also ==
- Nationality changes in gymnastics
