= Alexander Moskalenko =

Russian trampoline gymnast

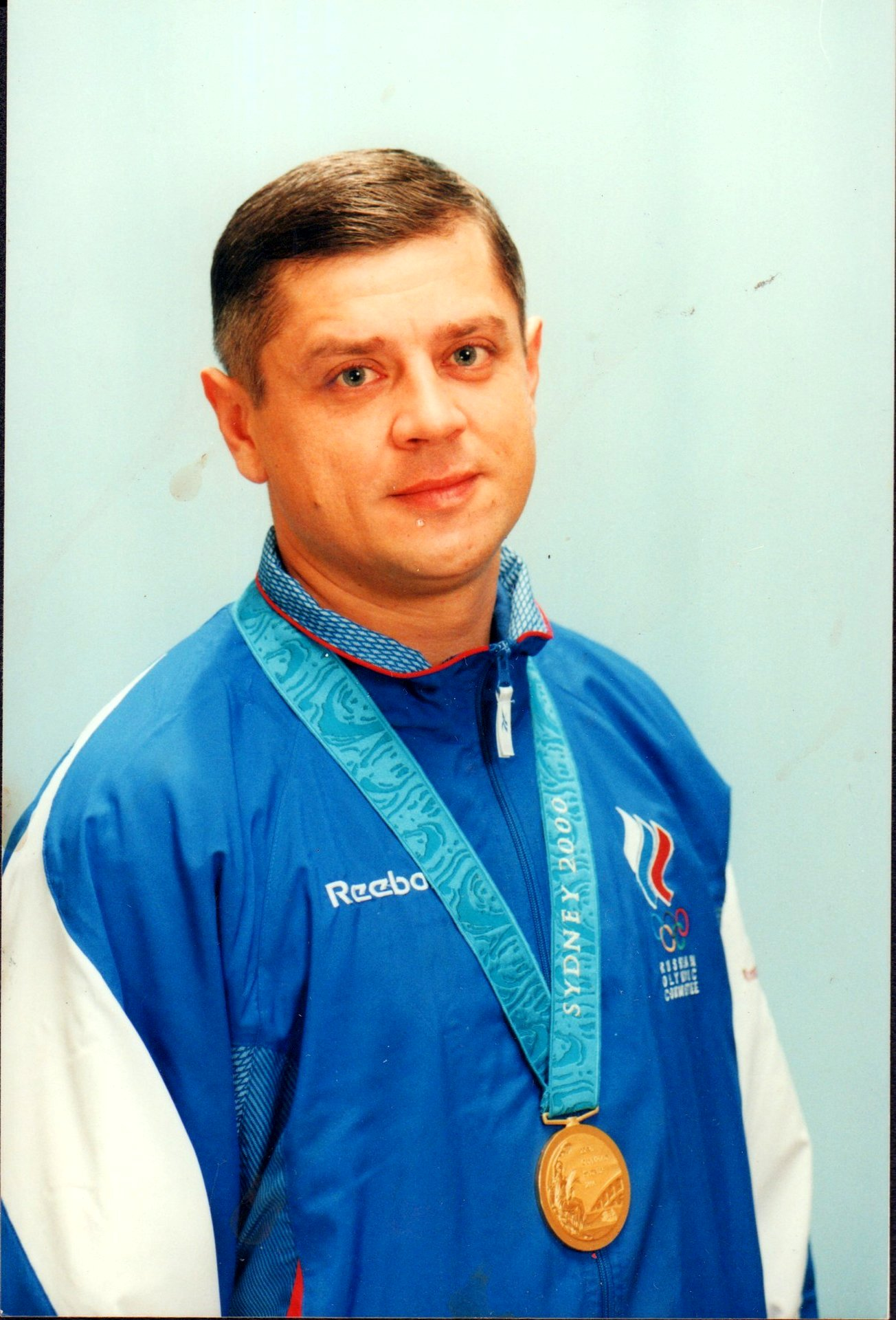

Personal information
- Born: November 4, 1969 (age 56) Bryukhovetsky District, Krasnodar Krai, Russian SFSR, Soviet Union

Gymnastics career
- Discipline: Trampoline gymnastics
- Country represented: Russia
- Retired: yes
Medal record
Men's trampoline gymnastics
Representing Russia
Olympic Games
Gold medal – first place	2000 Sydney	Individual
Silver medal – second place	2004 Athens	Individual
World Championships
Gold medal – first place	1992 Auckland	Individual
Gold medal – first place	1992 Auckland	Team
Gold medal – first place	1992 Auckland	Synchro
Gold medal – first place	1994 Porto	Individual
Gold medal – first place	1994 Porto	Synchro
Gold medal – first place	1998 Sydney	Team
Gold medal – first place	1999 Sun city	Individual
Gold medal – first place	1999 Sun city	Team
Gold medal – first place	1999 Sun city	Synchro
Gold medal – first place	2001 Odense	Individual
Gold medal – first place	2001 Odense	Team
Gold medal – first place	2001 Odense	Synchro
Silver medal – second place	1994 Porto	Team
Silver medal – second place	2003 Hannover	Individual
Silver medal – second place	2003 Hannover	Team
World Games
Gold medal – first place	2001 Akita	Synchro
Representing Soviet Union
World Championships
Gold medal – first place	1990 Essen	Individual
Gold medal – first place	1990 Essen	Team
Silver medal – second place	1990 Essen	Synchro

Alexander Moskalenko (born November 4, 1969) is a Russian former competitive trampoline gymnast. He is the 2000 Olympic champion and 2004 Olympic silver medalist in men's individual trampoline.

== Career ==
In the first half of the 1990s, Moskalenko won three world titles in individual trampoline (1990, 1992, 1994) and two in synchro (1992, 1994).

Moskalenko came out of retirement in 1998, when he learned that individual trampoline would become an Olympic discipline in 2000. It became a FIG discipline on 1 January 1999. Moskalenko decided to submit himself to a rigorous training programme to reestablish himself at the top of the ranking list and qualify for the Olympics. At the 1999 World Championships, he won gold in individual and synchro.

At the 2000 Summer Olympics in Sydney, Moskalenko became the first Olympic champion in men's trampoline, finishing ahead of Australia's Ji Wallace. The following year, he won gold in individual and synchro at the 2001 World Championships. He was awarded the silver medal at the 2003 World Championships behind Germany's Henrik Stehlik.

Moskalenko suffered from back pain during the whole of 2004. He won the silver medal behind Ukraine's Yuri Nikitin at the 2004 Summer Olympics in Athens, Greece. He retired on July 30 at the Dobrovolski World Cup in Krasnodar and was presented with a race horse. Almost thirty champions of different sports were present at the ceremony.
