= Jean-Pierre Thorn =

French film director (1947–2025)

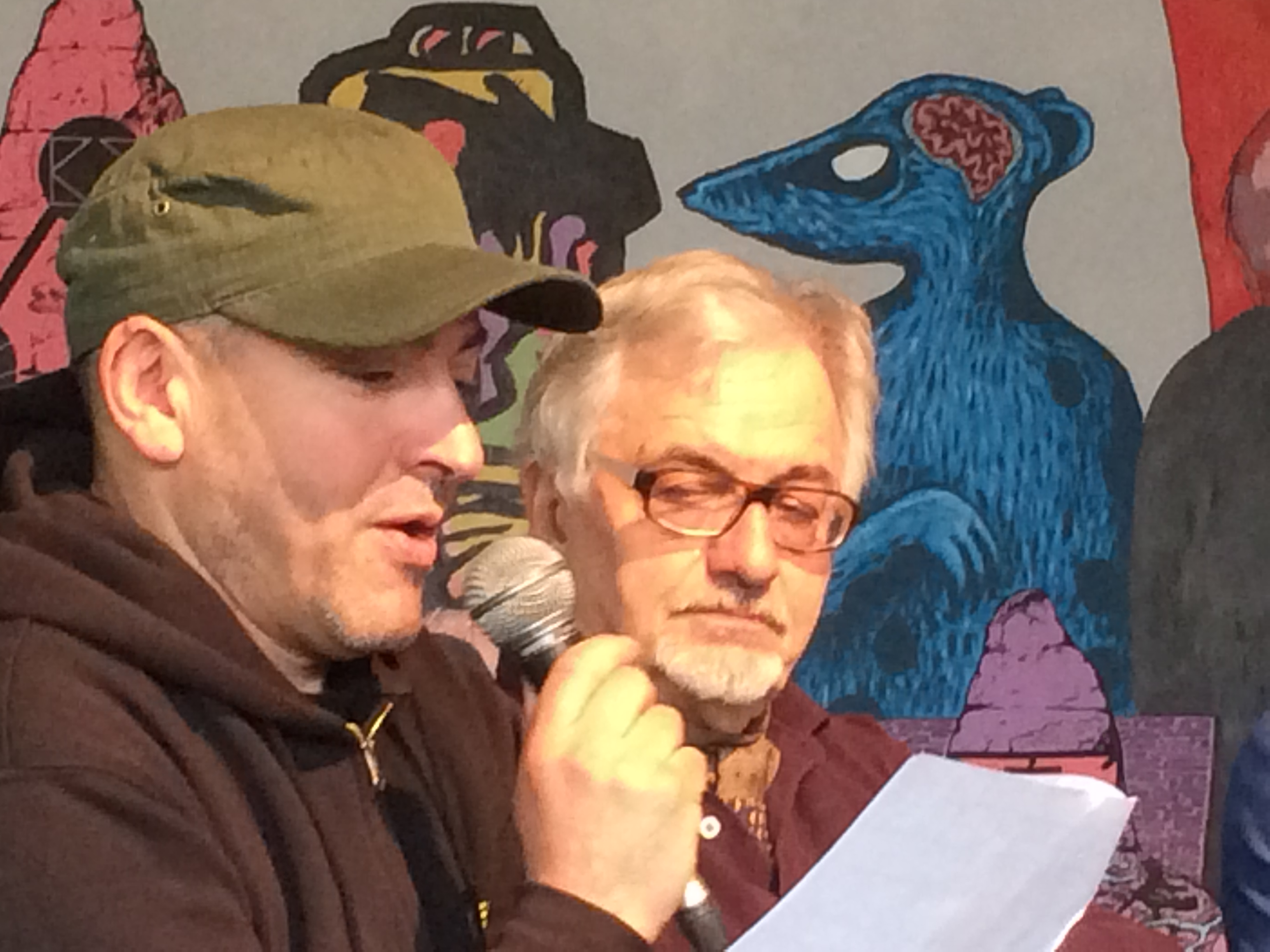
- Thorn in 2016
- Born: 24 January 1947; Paris, France
- Died: 5 July 2025 (aged 78)
- Occupation: Film director

Jean-Pierre Thorn (24 January 1947 – 5 July 2025) was a French film director.

== Life and career ==
Born in Paris on 24 January 1947, Thorn began his career in Aix-en-Provence directing theatrical pieces. In 1965, he directed his first short film, titled Emmanuelle. His first full-length film, Oser lutter oser vaincre, Flins 6, was released in 1968. He then abandoned cinema to work in an Alstom factory in Saint-Ouen in connection with the French Democratic Confederation of Labour. However, he returned to cinema in 1978. In 1989, he released a full-length documentary titled Je t'ai dans la peau, which covered François Mitterrand's victory in the 1981 French presidential election. In 1992, he co-founded the Association du cinéma indépendant pour sa diffusion. In 2019, he released L'Âcre Parfum des immortelles, which was about the premature death of his childhood sweetheart in the 1970s. In May of that year, he signed a letter in the newspaper Libération in support of the yellow vests protests.

Thorn died on 5 July 2025, at the age of 78.

== Filmography ==
- Emmanuelle (1966)
- Oser lutter oser vaincre, Flins 68 (1968)
- Le Dos au mur (1981)
- La Grève des ouvriers de Margoline (1981)
- Je t'ai dans la peau (1989)
- Bled Sisters (1993)
- Faire kiffer les anges (1997)
- On n'est pas des marques de vélo (2003)
- Allez, Yallah ! (2009)
- 93 La Belle Rebelle (2011)
- L'Âcre Parfum des immortelles (2019)

== Awards ==
- Prix Charles-Brabant (2023)
