= Yuri Nikitin (gymnast) =

Ukrainian trampoline gymnast

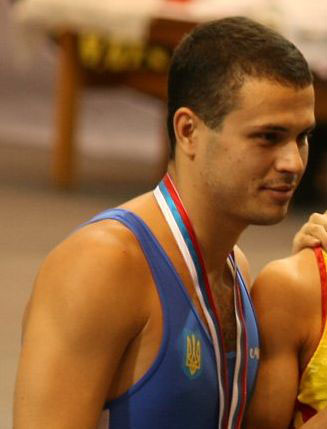
- Nikitin in 2011

Personal information
- Full name: Yuri Viktorovych Nikitin
- Born: 15 July 1978 (age 48) Kherson, Ukrainian SSR, Soviet Union
- Height: 172 cm (5 ft 8 in)

Gymnastics career
- Discipline: Trampoline gymnastics
- Country represented: Ukraine
Medal record
Representing Ukraine
Event	1st	2nd	3rd
Olympic Games	1	0	0
World Championships	0	0	4
European Championships	4	0	4
Total	5	0	8
Olympic Games
Gold medal – first place	2004 Athens	Trampoline
World Championships
Bronze medal – third place	1994 Porto	Synchro
Bronze medal – third place	2003 Hannover	Team Individual
Bronze medal – third place	2003 Hannover	Synchro
Bronze medal – third place	2009 Saint Petersburg	Synchro
European Championships
Gold medal – first place	2002 Saint Petersburg	Team
Gold medal – first place	2004 Sofia	Individual
Gold medal – first place	2004 Sofia	Synchro
Gold medal – first place	2008 Odense	Individual
Bronze medal – third place	1998 Dessau	Team
Bronze medal – third place	2008 Odense	Synchro
Bronze medal – third place	2012 Saint Petersburg	Team
Bronze medal – third place	2012 Saint Petersburg	Individual

Yuri Viktorovych Nikitin (Ukrainian: Юрій Вікторович Нікітін, born 15 July 1978) is a Ukrainian gymnast and Olympic champion. He won a gold medal at the 2004 Summer Olympics in Athens. He also competed at the 2008 and 2012 Summer Olympics.

== Before Olympics ==
Born on 15 July 1978 in Kherson, Ukraine. He began his sports career at Kherson State Secondary School. As a child, he was fond of jumping on a trampoline, as he says - "loved it for its extremity". His first coach was Igor Molchanov, who, according to Nikitin, taught the young athlete to "be a man" He graduated from the Kherson Higher School of Physical Culture. In 2012 he was trained by Volodymyr Gorzhi to prepare. In 2001, he graduated from Kherson State Pedagogical University. He was a member of the "Biola" sports club at KSPU.
