= Henrik Stehlik =

German trampoline gymnast

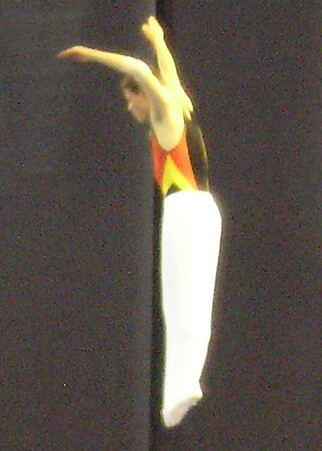
- Henrik Stehlik in 2008

Personal information
- Born: 29 December 1980 (age 45)
- Height: 175 cm (5 ft 9 in)

Gymnastics career
- Discipline: Trampoline gymnastics
- Country represented: Germany
- Head coach: Michael Kuhn
Medal record
Men's trampoline gymnastics
Representing Germany
Olympic Games
Bronze medal – third place	2004 Athens	Individual
World Games
Gold medal – first place	2005 Duisburg	Synchro
World Championships
Gold medal – first place	2003 Hannover	Individual
Gold medal – first place	2003 Hannover	Team
Silver medal – second place	1999 Sun city	Team

Henrik Stehlik (born 29 December 1980) is a German trampoline gymnast and three-time Olympic athlete. He competed at the 2004 Summer Olympics in Athens, where he received a bronze medal in the men's trampoline event. Since then he has also competed in the 2008 and 2012 Summer Olympics. Stehlik was also an active member of German Olympic Sports Federation (German: Deutscher Olympischer Sportbund, DOSB).

== Career achievements ==
- Winner in synchronized trampolining at the 2005 World Games, with Michael Serth
- Olympic bronze medal, 2004
- World Champion for both individual and team trampoline events, 2003
- European Masters, 2002, 2004, and 2006
