= Ji Wallace =

Australian trampoline gymnast

- Born: 23 June 1977 (age 49) Logan, Victoria, Australia
- Height: 179 cm (5 ft 10 in)

Gymnastics career
- Discipline: Trampoline gymnastics
- Country represented: Australia
Medal record
Men's trampoline gymnastics
Representing Australia
Olympic Games
Silver medal – second place	2000 Sydney	Individual
World Championships
Gold medal – first place	1996 Vancouver	Double mini
Silver medal – second place	1996 Vancouver	Double mini team
Bronze medal – third place	1994 Portugal	Double mini team
Bronze medal – third place	1998 Sydney	Double mini team
World Games
Bronze medal – third place	1997 Lahti	Synchro

Ji Wallace (born 23 June 1977 in Lismore, Victoria, Australia) is an Australian trampoline gymnast and Olympic silver medalist.

Earlier in his career, Wallace won several Australian national titles and made an international breakthrough in 1996 by winning gold in the double mini trampoline (DMT) discipline at the 19th Trampoline World Championships in Vancouver.

In the world championships held in Sydney, he set a world record for completing a jump with the highest degree of difficulty in the DMT, a triple-triple.

He competed at the 2000 Summer Olympics in Sydney, where he received a silver medal in trampoline.

In 2005, he came out publicly as gay, and was the first Australian to be named a Gay Games Ambassador. In an August 2012 letter to the Sydney Star Observer, a gay-oriented weekly tabloid newspaper, he revealed he is HIV-positive.

Wallace returned to his trampoline roots to qualify for the Beijing Olympics, but missed Olympic selection at the 2007 World Championships in Quebec, Canada.

Wallace was a cast member with the Cirque du Soleil in their show ZAIA in Macau, China. In October 2008 while performing an acrobatic move, Ji fell badly causing significant injuries; he spent 21 months rehabilitating his right ankle, learning to walk again. In August 2010, he took a coaching job in Montreal at the Cirque du Soleil headquarters but, in 2012, returned to his native Australia, where he is now head coach of Sky School, a trampoline program run by trampoline park chain Sky Zone.
