= Haruka Hirota =

Japanese Olympic trampoline gymnast

- Born: April 11, 1984 (age 42) Minoh, Osaka, Japan

Gymnastics career
- Discipline: Trampoline gymnastics
- Country represented: Japan

Haruka Hirota (廣田 遥, Hirota Haruka; born April 11, 1984) is a Japanese Olympic trampoline gymnast. She competed at the 2004 and 2008 Summer Olympics.
