= Robyn Forbes =

Australian trampoline gymnast

- Born: 24 April 1972 (age 54) Brisbane, Queensland, Australia
- Height: 1.67 m (5 ft 6 in)

Gymnastics career
- Discipline: Trampoline gymnastics
- Country represented: Australia
- Club: Omega
- Head coach: David Wareham
- Former coach: Melanie Tonks
Medal record
Women's trampoline gymnastics
Representing Australia
World Championships
Silver medal – second place	1990 Essen	Team Double Mini
Bronze medal – third place	1992 Auckland	Individual Double Mini
Bronze medal – third place	1992 Auckland	Team Double Mini
Bronze medal – third place	2001 Odense	Team Double Mini

Robyn Forbes (born 24 April 1972) is an Australian gymnast who competed at the Sydney 2000 Olympic Games.

Forbes was born in Brisbane on 24 April 1972. She began gymnastics at the age of ten and belonged to the Wynham PYC, where her first coach was Melanie Tonks.

She represented Australia at eight World Championships between 1990 and 2003.

At the Sydney 2000 Olympics Forbes competed in the women's individual trampoline event and finished tenth.
