= Marta Kubiak =

Polish politician (born 1985)

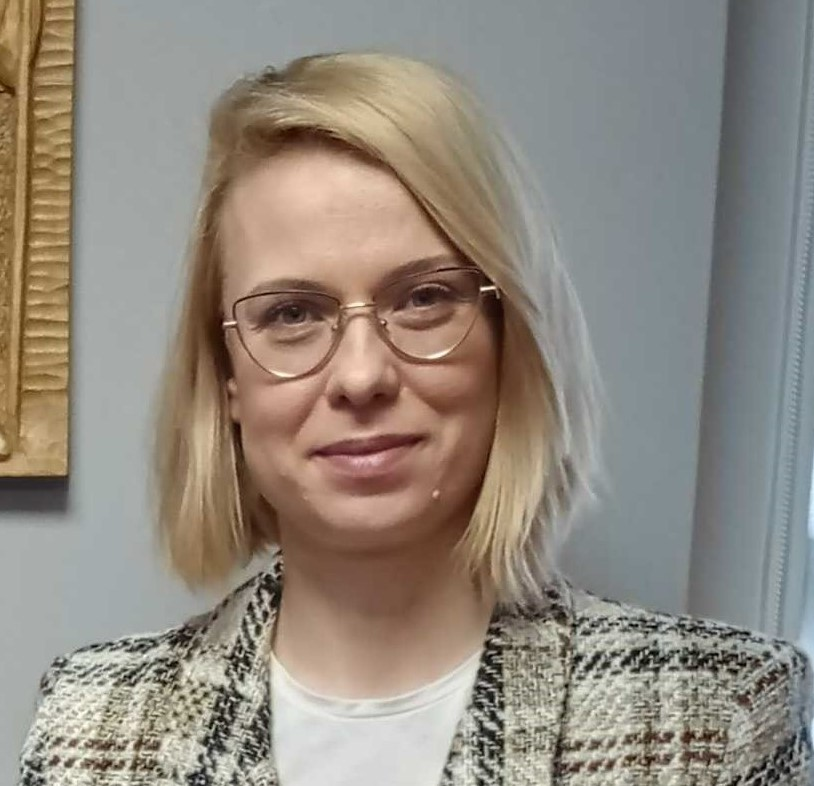

Member of the Sejm

Personal details
- Born: 21 September 1985 (age 40) Piła, Poland

Marta Ryszarda Kubiak (born 21 September 1985 in Piła) is a Polish politician. She was elected to the Sejm (9th term) representing the constituency of Piła. She previously also served in the 8th term of the Sejm (2015–2019).
