= Lee Brearley =

British trampoline gymnast

Personal information
- Full name: Lee John Brearley
- Nationality: British
- Born: 9 June 1980 (age 44); Manchester, England, UK
- Height: 5 ft 8.5 in (175 cm)
- Weight: 139 lb (63 kg)

Achievements and titles
- Olympic finals: 6th in 2000 Summer Olympics

Lee John Brearley (born 9 June 1980) is a British former trampolinist who was a competitor in the 2000 Summer Olympics. Lee finished 6th place in the Men's Individual Trampolining in 2000 for Great Britain.

Brearley also performed with Cirque du Soleil's show Paramour.

== See also ==
- Gymnastics at the 2000 Summer Olympics – Men's trampoline
