= Olena Movchan =

Ukrainian trampoline gymnast

- Full name: Olena Dmytrivna Movchan
- Born: 17 August 1976 (age 50) Mykolaiv, Ukrainian SSR, Soviet Union
- Height: 155 cm (5 ft 1 in)

Gymnastics career
- Discipline: Trampoline gymnastics
- Country represented: Ukraine
Medal record
Women's trampoline gymnastics
Representing Ukraine
Event	1st	2nd	3rd
World Championships	4	4	2
European Championships	4	5	1
World Games	3	1	0
Total	11	10	3
World Championships
Gold medal – first place	1996 Vancouver	Synchro
Gold medal – first place	1999 Sun City	Synchro
Gold medal – first place	2001 Odense	Team individual
Gold medal – first place	2001 Odense	Synchro
Silver medal – second place	1998 Sydney	Synchro
Silver medal – second place	1999 Sun City	Team individual
Silver medal – second place	2003 Hannover	Individual
Silver medal – second place	2003 Hannover	Synchro
Bronze medal – third place	1994 Porto	Synchro
Bronze medal – third place	1998 Sydney	Team individual
World Games
Gold medal – first place	2009 Kaohsiung	Synchro
Gold medal – first place	2001 Akita	Synchro
Gold medal – first place	1997 Lahti	Synchro
Silver medal – second place	1997 Lahti	Individual
European Championships
Gold medal – first place	1993 Sursee	Synchro
Gold medal – first place	2006 Metz	Team
Gold medal – first place	2008 Odense	Team
Gold medal – first place	2008 Odense	Synchro
Silver medal – second place	2002 Saint Petersburg	Team
Silver medal – second place	2002 Saint Petersburg	Individual
Silver medal – second place	2004 Sofia	Team
Silver medal – second place	2006 Metz	Synchro
Silver medal – second place	2008 Odense	Individual
Bronze medal – third place	1997 Eindhoven	Team

Olena Dmytrivna Movchan (Ukrainian: Олена Дмитрівна Мовчан; born 17 August 1976) is a Ukrainian world champion trampoline gymnast. She represented Ukraine at both the 2004 and 2008 Summer Olympics.
