= Dmitri Poliaroush =

Belarusian gymnastics coach and trampolinist

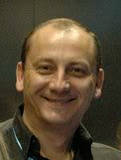
- Dmitri Poliaroush

Personal information
- Nickname: The Russian Machine
- Born: September 20, 1970 (age 55) Berezniki, Russia

Gymnastics career
- Discipline: Trampoline gymnastics
- Country represented: Belarus
- Former countries represented: Soviet Union
- Eponymous skills: Poliaroush (Double Full In – Double Full Out)

Dmitri Vladimir "Dima" Poliaroush (born September 20, 1970) is a Belarusian gymnastics coach and former competitive trampolinist. He is a six-time World Champion, seven-time European Champion, and twenty-time World Cup winner. He competed at the 2000 Summer Olympics and the 2004 Summer Olympics, finishing fifth and fourth respectively. Poliaroush was the first man to perform a “Double Full In – Double Full Out” on trampoline and the skill is named after him. He is the only person who has been an active trampolinist and trampoline coach at the Olympic Games.

== Early life ==
Dmitri Poliaroush was born on September 20, 1970, in Berezniki, Russia. From a young age, he wanted to be an astronaut. At the age of 6, he saw a trampolinist flying in the air, and he later told his mother that he wanted to do this. He joined the local trampoline club in Berezniki, where his talent was noticed.

== Competitive career ==
=== Before 1990 ===
In 1984, Poliaroush won the Soviet Union Junior National Competitions and was named to the Soviet Union junior team. In 1985, he competed in his first international competition in Denmark, where he finished 5th. In 1986, he won the bronze medal at the Soviet Union National Championships, won the European Junior Championships, and participated at his first Trampoline World Championships in Paris. Only 16, he finished 5th in the individual event there and won silver in the team event with the rest of the Soviet team.

In 1987 and 1988, Poliaroush won the Soviet Union National Championships, which had been one of his goals. In 1988, he competed at the World Championships in Birmingham, USA, where he brought home a gold medal in the team competition and a silver in the individual competition. He finished second in the final round of competition to Vadim Krasnoshapka by only 0.2.

=== 1990s ===
From 1990, Poliaroush regularly competed head to head against Alexander Moskalenko. At the 1990 World Championships in Essen, Germany, Poliaroush won two gold medals (team and synchronized), and silver again in individual, placing second to teammate Alexander Moskalenko. This loss was a motivation for Poliaroush to make upgrades to his routine.

In 1991 at the European Championships, Poliaroush competed with a routine that had a difficulty of 14.6, which was a new world record. His routine finished with a new skill that had never been seen before, a double full in – double full out, which would later be named the “Poliaroush”. In 1991, the Soviet Union Sports Government honored him with the highest national athletic title, Honor Master of Sport of the Soviet Union. In 1992, Poliaroush was not able to compete at the World Championships due to political problems within the Soviet Union.

In 1993, Poliaroush moved to Vitebsk, Belarus and started representing Belarus at international competitions. This helped the Belarus team tremendously. He led the team to beat the reigning world champions, Russia, at the World Championships in 1994. In 1995, the Belarus Sport Administration awarded Poliaroush with the title Honored Master of Sport of the Republic of Belarus. In 1995 and 1996, he won many World Cup titles, World Cup final, European Championships, and finally the individual world title, at the World Championships in 1996 in Vancouver, Canada.

After this competition, Poliaroush retired, but in 1998, when the sport was added to the Olympics, he decided to make a comeback. At the time, he was already living in the Lafayette, Louisiana, United States where he had started his coaching career. He found it difficult to combine his coaching and training life together. At the 1999 World Championships in South Africa, he finished in 4th place.

=== 2000 – 2005 ===
In 2000, he won all competitions that he entered, including the World Cup in Great Britain. There he set two new world records in Optional Routine and total score. His routine was given a 42.1, with a 14.2 tariff of difficulty, which made his execution scores, 9.3 9.2 9.3 9.4 9.3. In Sydney, Australia, trampoline made its Olympic debut. Two days before the competition took place, Poliaroush celebrated his 30th birthday. Preliminary competitions went extremely well, but he made a significant error in the final routine and finished in 5th place.

After a half year of break, Poliaroush decided to continue competing until the 2004 Olympic Games. He was a winner and medalist at many competitions such as the Goodwill Games and World Cups. In 2003, at the World Championships, he won the synchronized world title with Nikolai Kasak, which made him the oldest male to win a world title in trampoline. He was 33 years old. In Athens, at the Olympic Games, Poliaroush finished 4th and retired afterward.

Over his career, he won a total of 13 medals from the World Championships.

== Trampoline records and special awards ==
Poliaroush set many world records in the sport of trampoline. They are listed below:

- 1991-1997- World Difficulty Record
- 2000 – Highest Optional Score
- 2000 – Highest Total Score
- 2004 – Winner of the most individual World Cups (Men)

His awards include:

- 1991– Honor Master of Sport of the USSR
- 1995 – Honor Master of Sport of the Republic of Belarus
- 2008 – Inducted to Gallery of the Legends, World Acrobatic Association

== Coaching career ==
In 1998, Poliaroush began coaching at Trampoline and Tumbling Express in Lafayette, Louisiana, US. His students include 2008 Olympians Erin Blanchard and Chris Estrada, 2010 Youth Olympian Hunter Brewster, 2012 Olympian Savannah Vinsant, 2016 and 2021 Olympian Nicole Ahsinger, and 2021 Olympian Aliaksei Shostak.

From 2005 to 2008, Poliaroush was the USA Trampoline and Tumbling National Team coordinator, where he was serving USA Gymnastics to help develop the sport of trampoline in the United States. USA Gymnastics has awarded him with the USA Trampoline Coach of the Year Award multiple times.

Poliaroush currently resides in Lafayette, Louisiana, where he is the president of the Olympic Trampoline Academy and the head trampoline coach at Trampoline and Tumbling Express. He began serving the Fédération Internationale de Gymnastique on the Trampoline Technical Committee in 2005 and has been elected through the 2022-2024 cycle. He is a FIG Category 1 Brevet judge, the highest rating.
