= Alan Villafuerte =

Dutch trampoline gymnast

- Full name: Alan Gabriel Villafuerte
- Born: 29 June 1977 (age 49) San Salvador, El Salvador

Gymnastics career
- Discipline: Trampoline gymnastics
- Country represented: Netherlands

Alan Villafuerte (born 29 June 1977) is a Dutch trampoline gymnast. He represented the Netherlands at the 2000 Summer Olympics in Sydney, Australia and at the 2004 Summer Olympics in Athens, Greece. In the men's trampoline competition in 2000 he finished in 7th place. In the men's trampoline competition in 2004 he finished in 15th place in the qualification round.
