= Michael Serth =

German trampoline gymnast

- Full name: Michael Serth
- Born: 24 June 1975 (age 51) Langen, West Germany
- Height: 185 cm (6 ft 1 in)

Gymnastics career
- Country represented: Germany

Michael Serth (born 24 June 1975), is a German former trampoline gymnast. He had competed at the 2000 Summer Olympics in Sydney.
