= Irina Karavayeva =

Russian trampoline gymnast

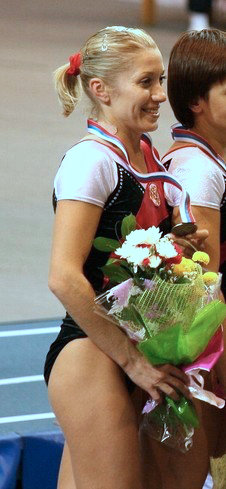

Personal information
- Full name: Irina Vladimirovna Karavayeva
- Born: 18 May 1975 (age 51) Krasnodar, Russian SFSR, Soviet Union

Gymnastics career
- Discipline: Trampoline gymnastics
- Country represented: Russia
- Head coach: Vitaly Dubko
- Assistant coach: Ludmila Nemejan
Medal record
Women's trampoline gymnastics
Representing Russia
Olympic Games
Gold medal – first place	2000 Sydney	Individual
World Championships
Gold medal – first place	1994 Porto	Individual
Gold medal – first place	1994 Porto	Team
Gold medal – first place	1996 Vancouver	Team
Gold medal – first place	1998 Sydney	Individual
Gold medal – first place	1998 Sydney	Team
Gold medal – first place	1999 Sun City	Individual
Gold medal – first place	1999 Sun City	Team
Gold medal – first place	2003 Hannover	Team
Gold medal – first place	2005 Eindhoven	Individual
Gold medal – first place	2005 Eindhoven	Synchro
Gold medal – first place	2007 Quebec	Individual
Gold medal – first place	2010 Metz	Synchro
Silver medal – second place	1996 Vancouver	Individual
Silver medal – second place	2001 Odense	Individual
Silver medal – second place	2005 Eindhoven	Team
Silver medal – second place	2007 Quebec	Synchro
Silver medal – second place	2009 St Petersburg	Team
Bronze medal – third place	1999 Sun City	Synchro
Bronze medal – third place	2007 Quebec	Team
World Games
Silver medal – second place	2005 Duisburg	Synchro
Bronze medal – third place	2001 Akita	Synchro
European Championships
Gold medal – first place	1995 Antibes	Individual
Gold medal – first place	1997 Eindhoven	Team
Gold medal – first place	1998 Dessau	Team
Gold medal – first place	2000 Eindhoven	Individual
Gold medal – first place	2000 Eindhoven	Team
Gold medal – first place	2002 Saint Petersburg	Team
Gold medal – first place	2004 Sofia	Individual
Gold medal – first place	2004 Sofia	Team
Gold medal – first place	2006 Metz	Individual
Gold medal – first place	2006 Metz	Synchro
Gold medal – first place	2010 Varna	Individual
Gold medal – first place	2010 Varna	Team
Silver medal – second place	2008 Odense	Team
Silver medal – second place	2008 Odense	Synchro

Irina Vladimirovna Karavayeva (born 18 May 1975 in Krasnodar) is a Russian trampoline gymnast, competing at an international level since 1990.

== Career ==
Originally beginning her sports career as a tumbler, Karavayeva soon switched to trampolining and excelled. She competed in the 2000 and 2004 Olympic Games, becoming the first female Olympic champion in this discipline. She is a three-time European Champion, 3 time World Champion and 2000 Olympic Champion. She belongs to the Krasnodar club and is coached by Vitaly Dubko.

She is well known within the sport of gymnastics as being a dedicated and driven athlete. This was especially made apparent during the 1999 World Championships in Sun City, where she won her third world title, in spite of severe back pain, that put her in a clinic for the following two months.

During the 2001 Trampoline World Championships, held in July, in the city of Odense, the gold medal was awarded Karavayeva incorrectly following a serious judging mistake. Karavayeva, at the World Games in August 2001, made the following statement; "I very much regret the mistake of the judges at the World Championships in Denmark. I consider that it is necessary to correct this mistake and I decided to give the Gold Medal to my friend Ana Dogonadze from Germany in the spirit of friendship and fair-play." FIG (Fédération Internationale de Gymnastique) rules state that once a medal has been awarded, official results cannot be changed. However, FIG President and IOC Member, Mr Bruno Grandi, made an exception to this ruling and allowed the error to be corrected. This led to Karavayeva being awarded the silver medal. Following this incident, she received the International Fair Play award from the hand of IOC President, Jacques Rogge.

Karavayeva took the World Record for the most difficult trampolining routine completed in a competition by a woman. The difficulty was 15.60. This record was broken on October 8, 2011, by Emma Smith (GBR), at the Trampoline and Tumbling World Cup, held in Odense, Denmark.
