= Pullinger =

Pullinger may refer to:

- Amanda Pullinger (born 1966), chief executive
- Dorothée Pullinger (1894–1986), automobile engineer
- George Pullinger (1920–1982), cricketer
- Herbert Pullinger (1878–1961), illustrator
- Jackie Pullinger (born 1944), missionary
- Jan Pullinger (born 1947), politician
- John Pullinger (born 1959), statistician
- Kate Pullinger, novelist
- Thomas Pullinger (1867–1945), automobile engineer

== See also ==
- Beardmore Halford Pullinger, manufacturer
- Pullinger Kop, park
- Pullingers, chain of stores
