= Farnham Beer Exhibition =

Beer festival in Farnham, Surrey, UK

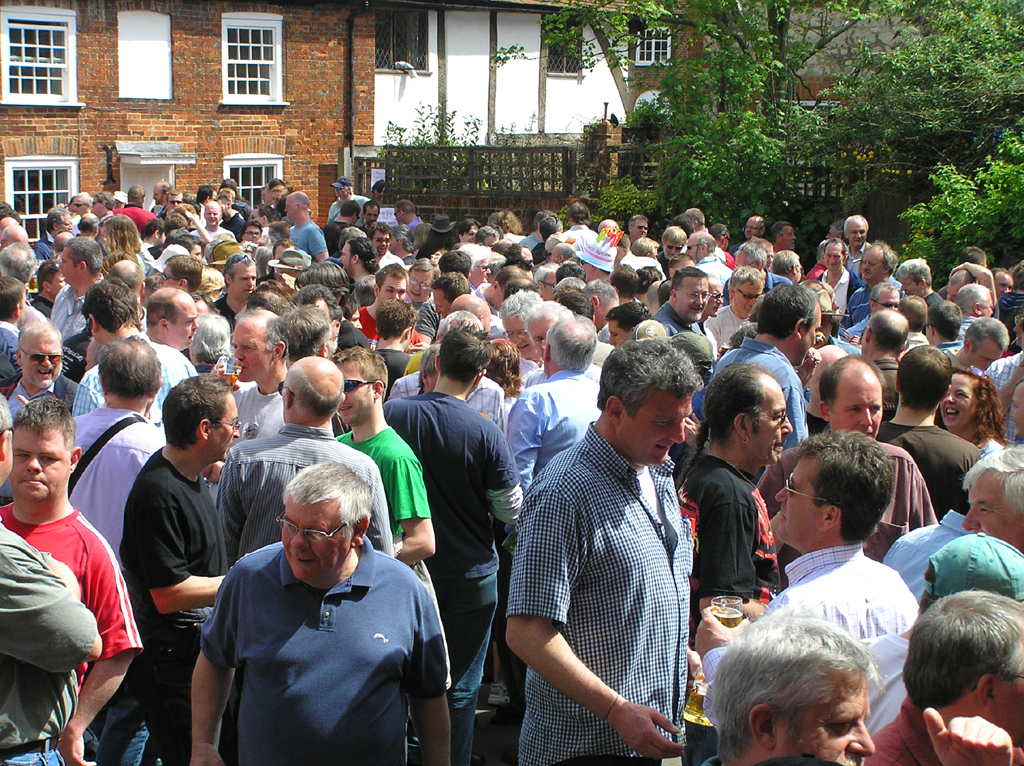
A crowd at Farnham Beerex 2008

Farnham Beer Exhibition, usually but informally known as Farnham Beerex (or just Beerex), is the longest established beer festival in the United Kingdom to be held annually on the same premises. Held in Farnham, Surrey, the first Beerex took place in 1977, and serves as a charity fundraiser for the Lions Club of Farnham.

== History ==
Held in Farnham, Surrey, the first Beerex took place in 1977, three years after CAMRA had been established, as a means of promoting traditional cask-conditioned beers from British breweries in line with CAMRA's aims, whilst raising money for charity. The concept was the idea of two CAMRA members who were also members of the Farnham Lions Club. These two, Paul Blowfield and Ralph Carter, were inspired by CAMRA's Covent Garden Beer Festival (London) of 1975. They took the idea to their two organisations, who then joined with the Farnham Maltings Association to organise the first event, which pre-dated the first CAMRA Great British Beer Festival by some months. The event attracted more attendees than anticipated necessitating additional supplies of beer and glasses. Originally planned as a one-off event, it has taken place every year since at the Farnham Maltings in late April or early May, still organised by the same three organisations.

== Organisation ==
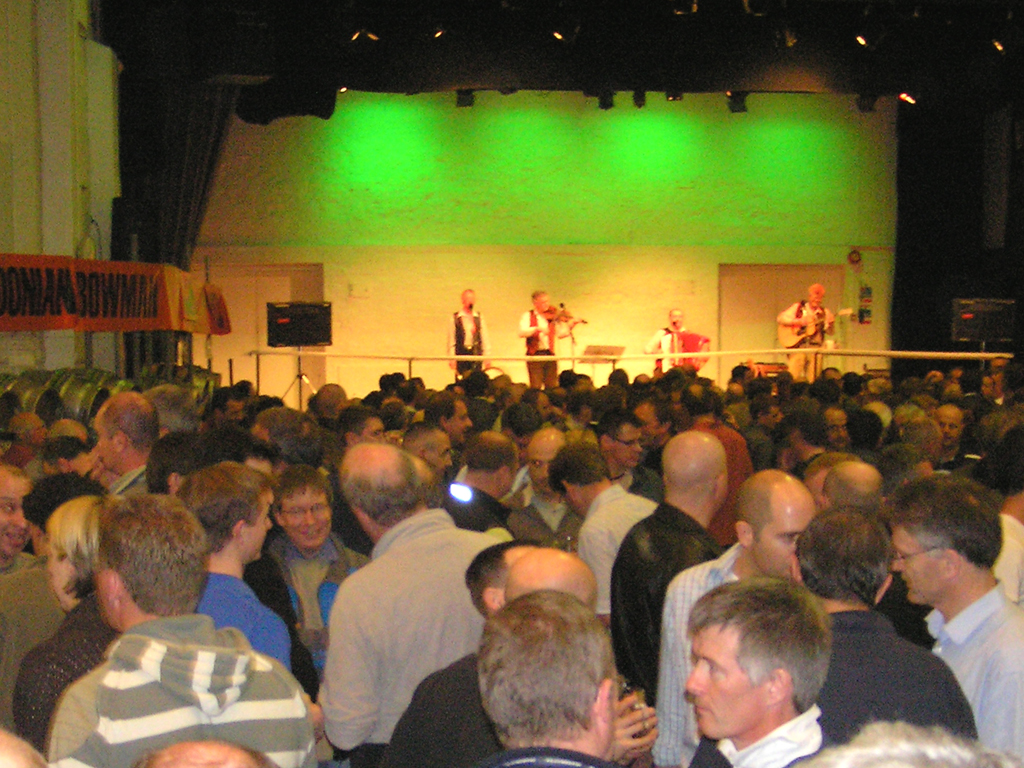
The Yetties performing at Farnham Beerex 2008

It is organised and staffed entirely by unpaid volunteers. Admission is by advance ticket only, which generally sell-out within hours of release, some months before the event. The event has raised in excess of £900,000 for mainly local charities and good causes through the Lions Club of Farnham, and has been instrumental in raising awareness of traditional beers in the Farnham area which can now boast a number of independent breweries including the longer-established Hogs Back Brewery.

Special half-pint glasses have been issued each year, and limited edition pint glasses for the 10th and 21st Exhibitions; these are very collectable and some reach high values. Since 1978 the Souvenir Programme has carried a front-cover cartoon by Bill Tidy and a booklet of these cartoons was published in 2006.
