= Museum of Farnham =

Museum in Farnham, Surrey, England

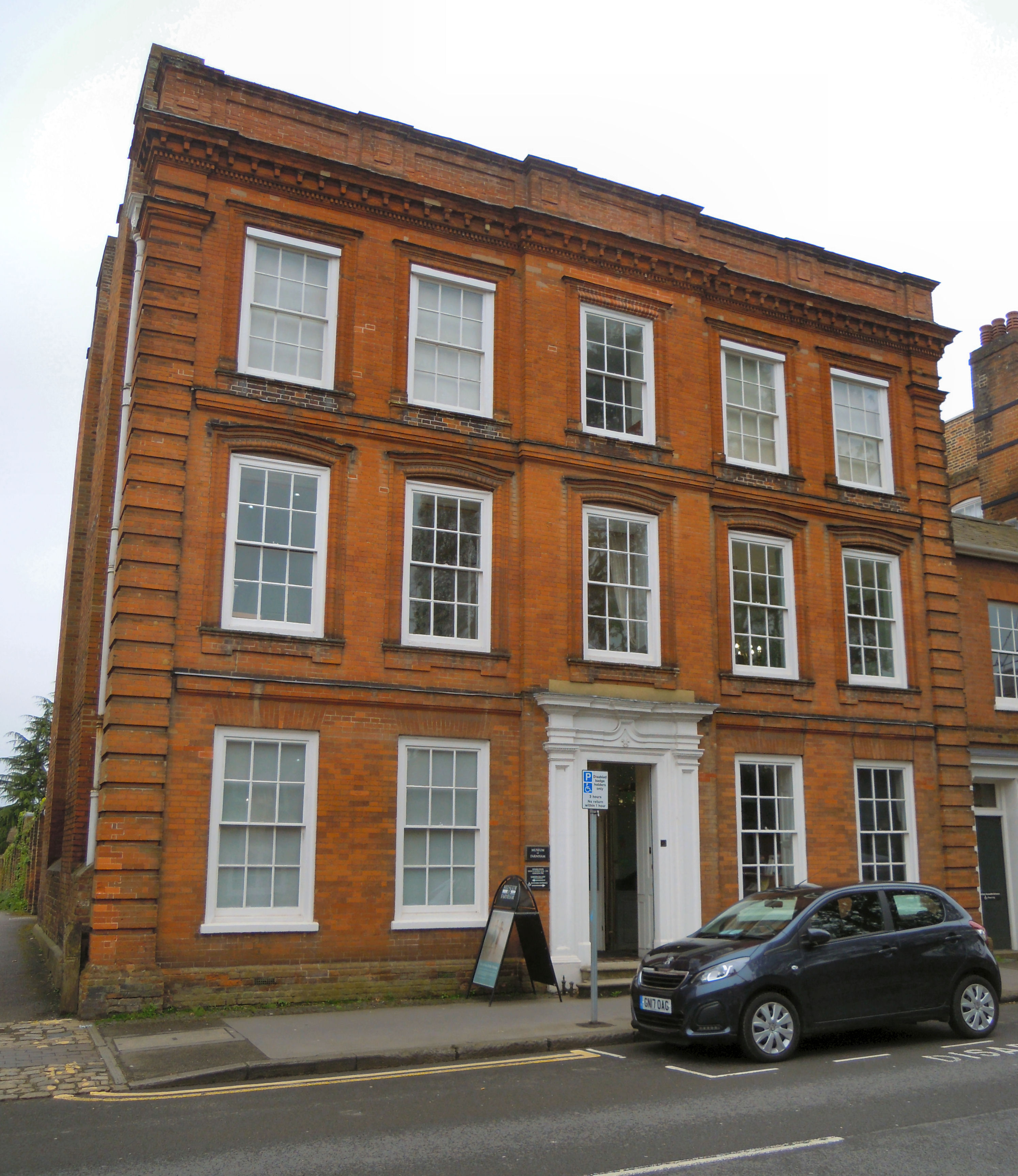
The Museum of Farnham in 2018

The Museum of Farnham is located in Willmer House, an 18th-century town house completed in 1718 with a decorative brickwork façade on West Street in Farnham in Surrey. Events were held in 2018 by the museum to celebrate the 300th anniversary of the building. The Museum houses a collection of artefacts spanning several periods of the town's history and prehistory. Open from Monday to Saturday, there is no admission charge. The Museum has a Muniment Room available to researchers with its extensive collection of printed material relating to Farnham and the surrounding area.

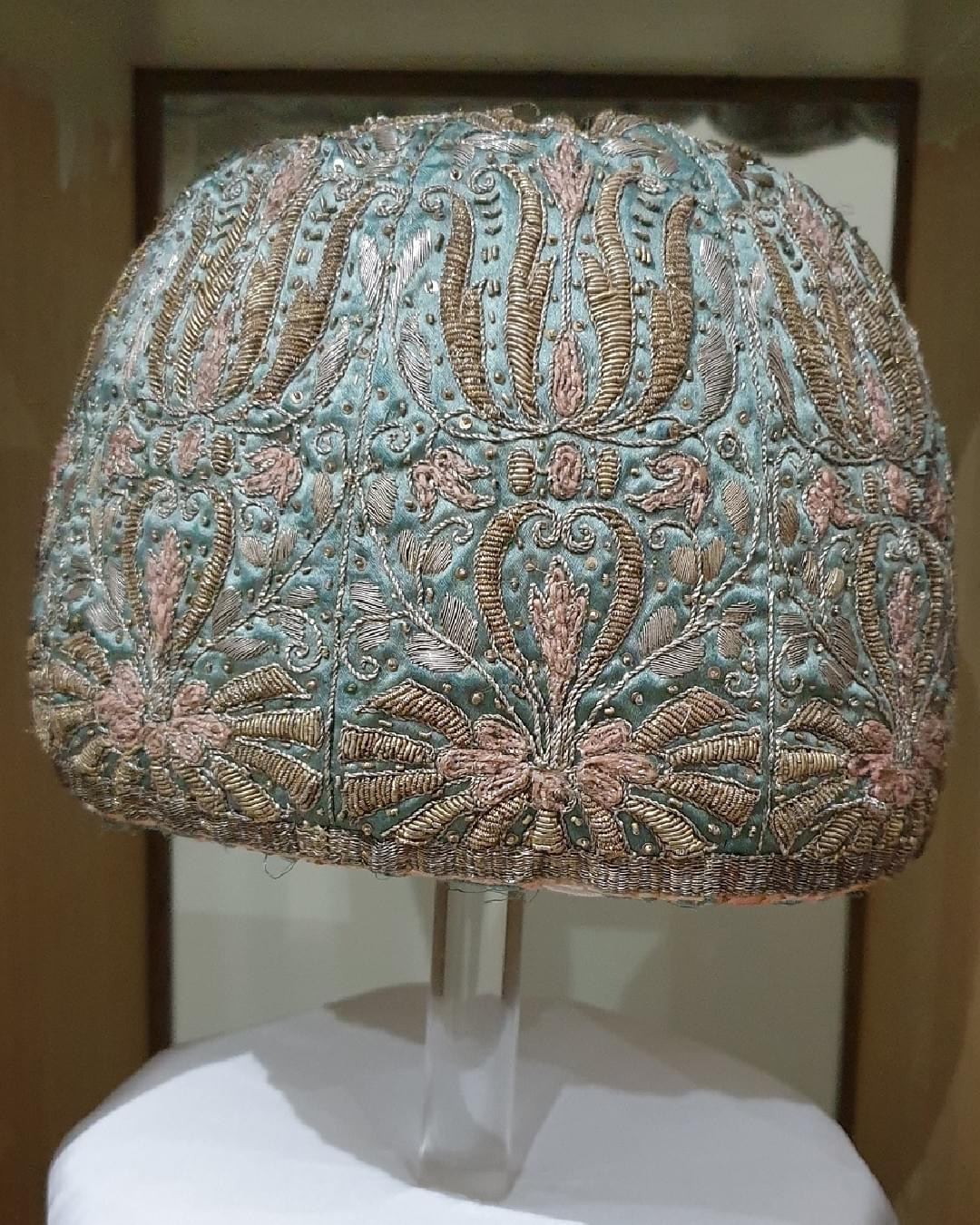
Nightcap belonging to Charles I displayed in the museum

The museum was founded in 1961 to provide the Farnham community with a collection dedicated to the history of the local area in an elegant Grade I listed Georgian townhouse which still retains many original features, including a walled garden. Spread over two floors and in six rooms, displays include items from a large and eclectic collection; from ancient archaeological artefacts to nationally important artworks by local artists and an extensive costume collection. Permanent displays include an elaborately embroidered nightcap belonging to Charles I, who in 1649 stayed in a nearby house on his way to trial in London; a decorated and gilded cassone panel by W. H. Allen; artworks of local scenes by John Verney, and objects connected with William Cobbett.

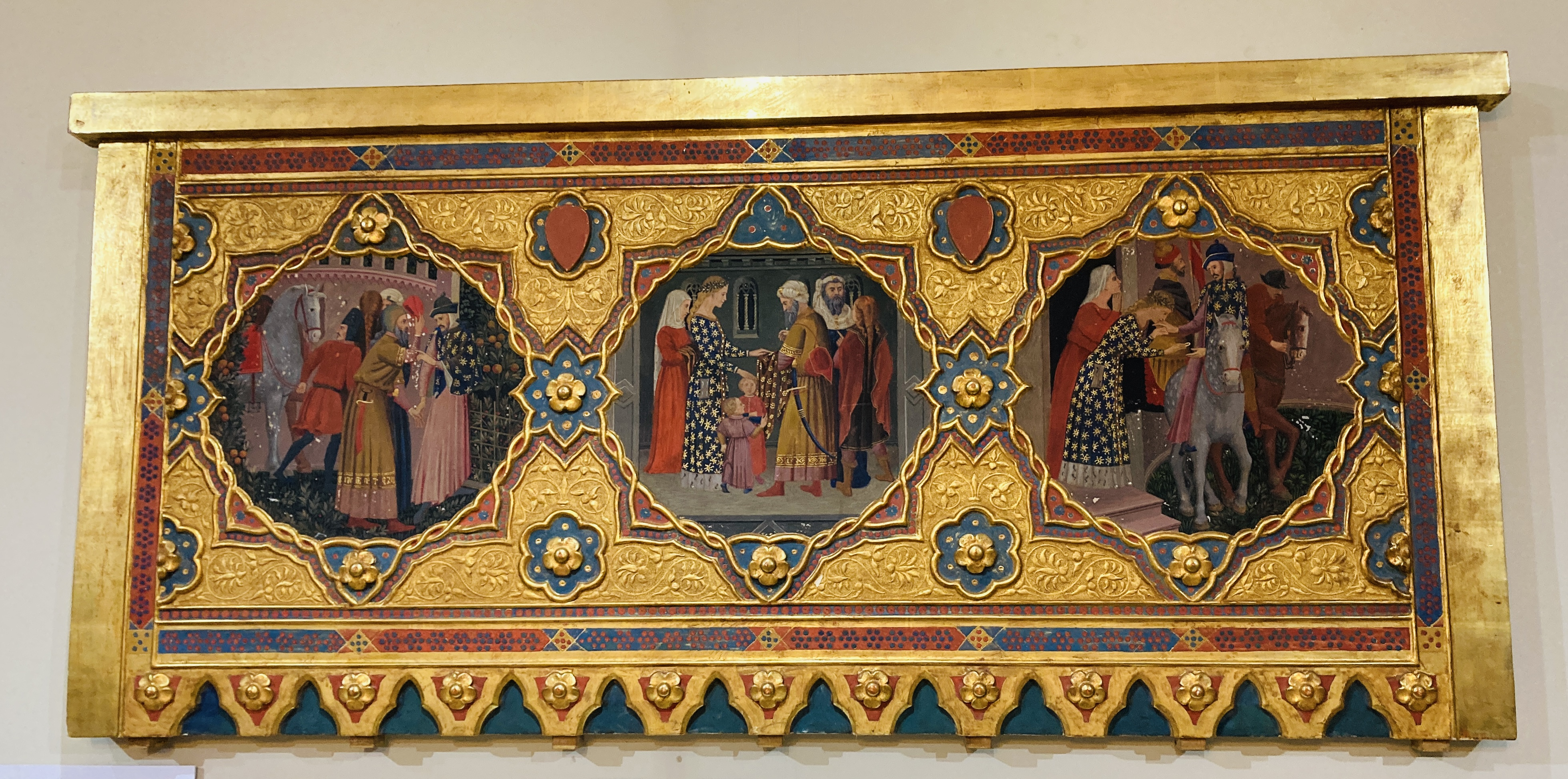
Panel for a cassone by W. H. Allen from early in his career

The Museum of Farnham is part of the Farnham Maltings Association, a creative organisation working with artists and communities to encourage people to get involved in Art in every aspect, including making and seeing Art. To achieve that aim, the Museum is closely involved with the Farnham Maltings.

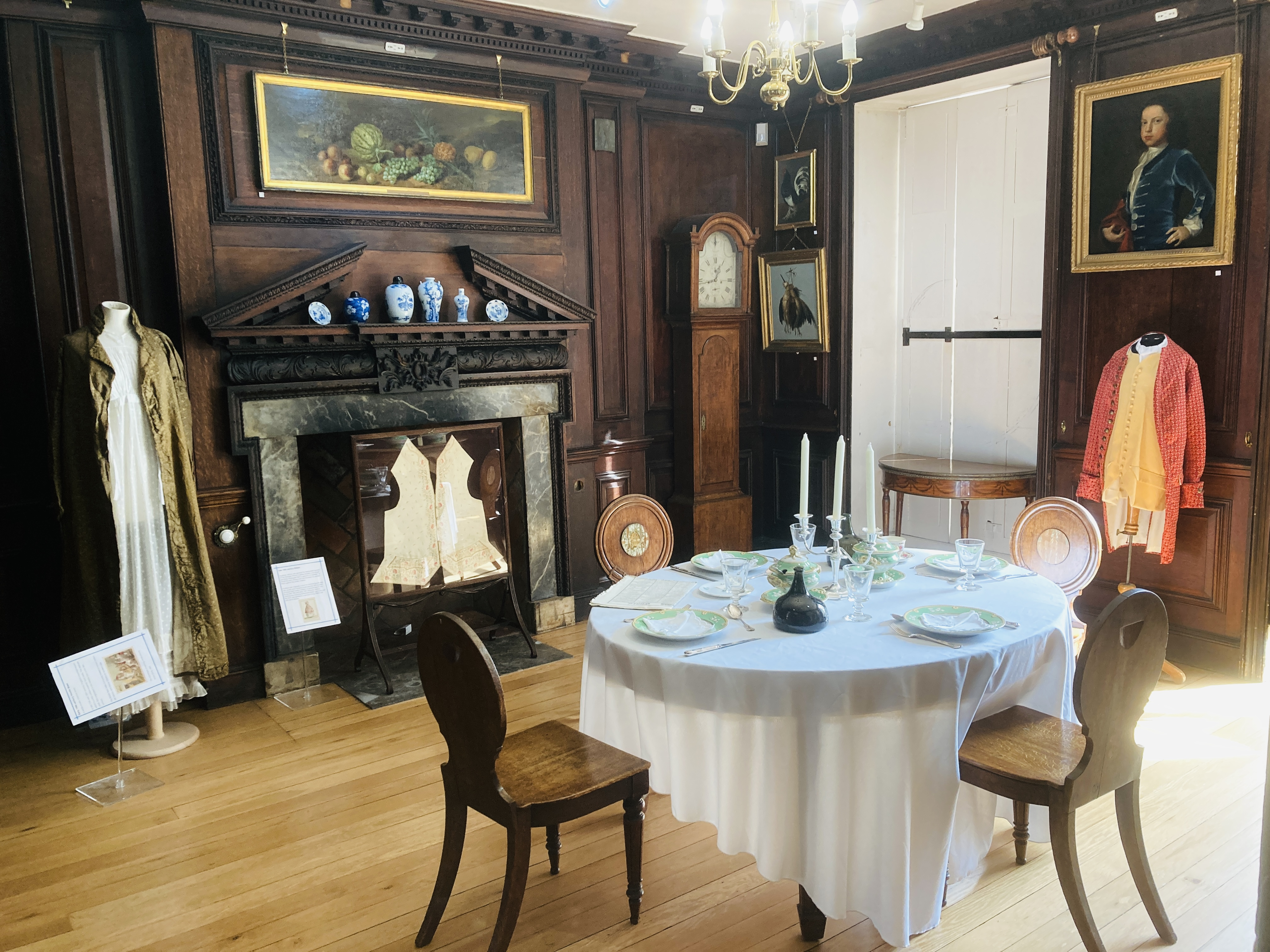
Display of costumes and original features

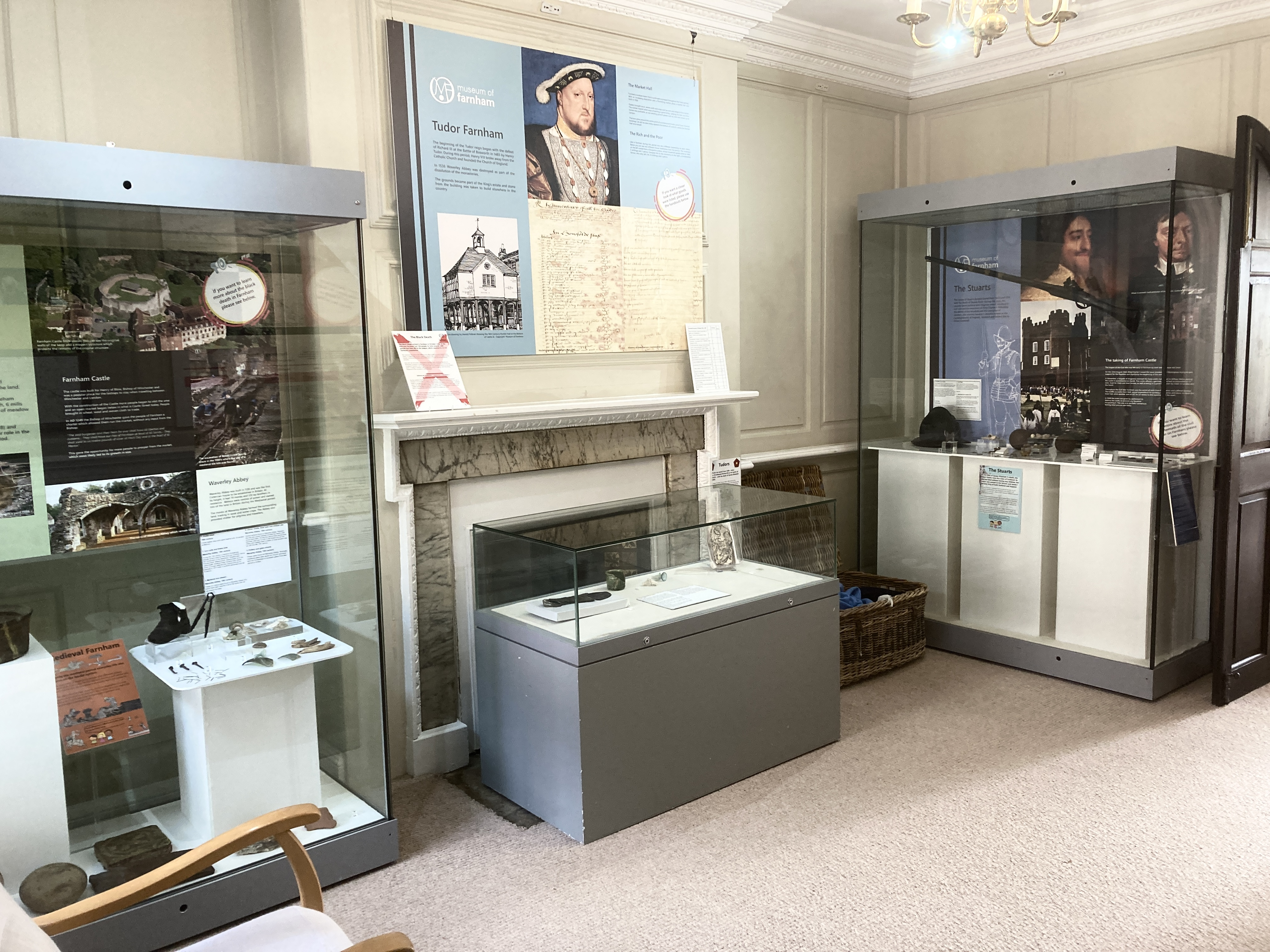
Cabinets showing artifacts found locally

Willmer House was purchased by Waverley Borough Council from Surrey County Council in 2012. The new owners began a £92,000 restoration of the façade but this was halted in 2017 when the condition was found to be much worse than thought. The council was notified that significant repair work was required in 2018 and since then scaffolding has been erected to protect the public from any falling masonry, this has partially obscured the façade.

The costs of the repairs prohibited immediate work and had the potential to threaten the future of the museum in the building. In October 2021 Waverley Borough Council indicated that it intended to relinquish ownership of the museum to an independent trust, as it was judged to make applying for grants easier. In September 2022 the council bid for more than £600,000 of funding from the Arts Council England to restore the façade. If granted this would still leave a shortfall of around £200,000, towards which local councillors started a crowdfunding campaign.
