= Willmer House =

Building in Farnham, Surrey, England

Coordinates: 51°12′48″N 0°48′16″W

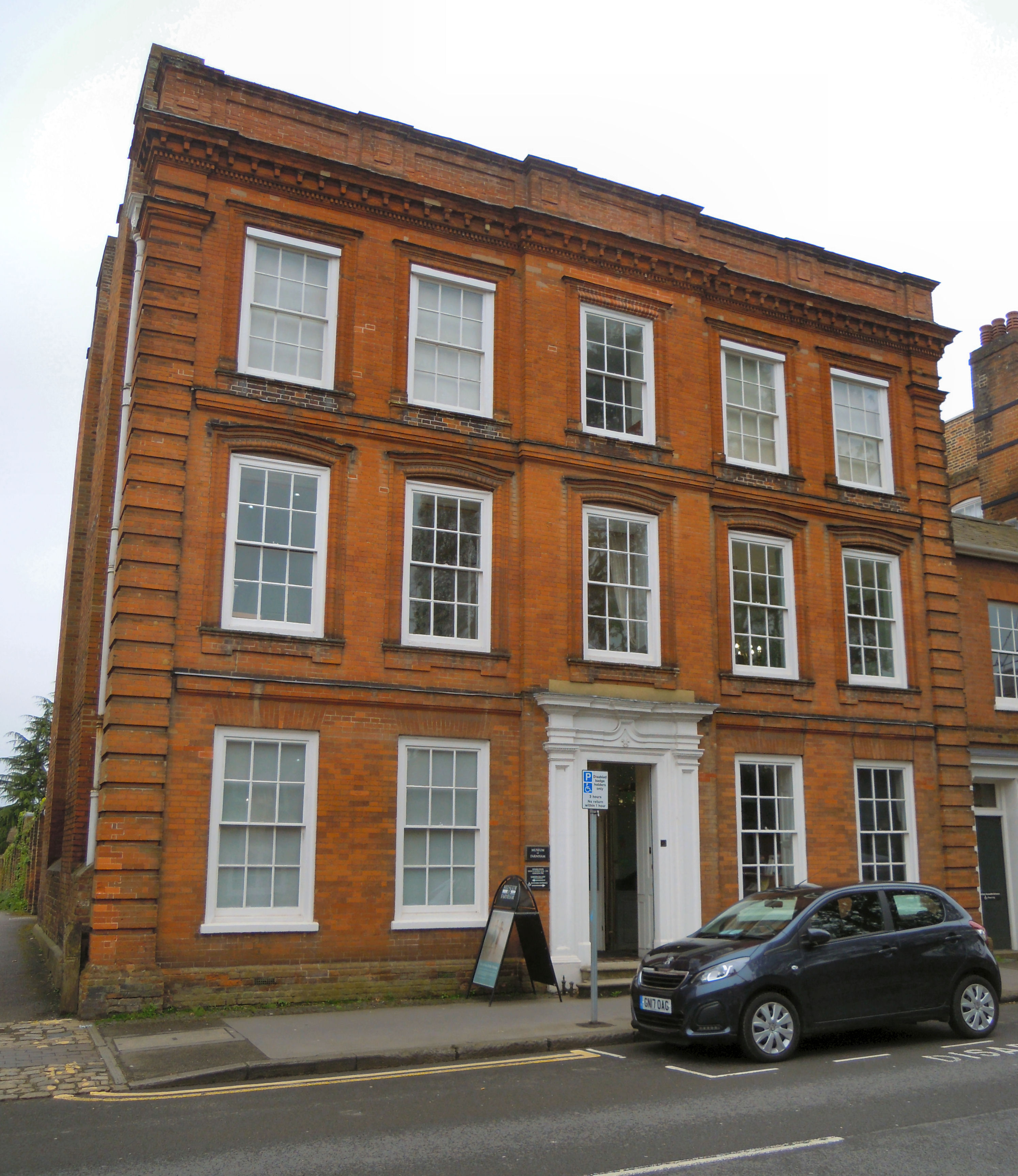
Façade pictured in 2018

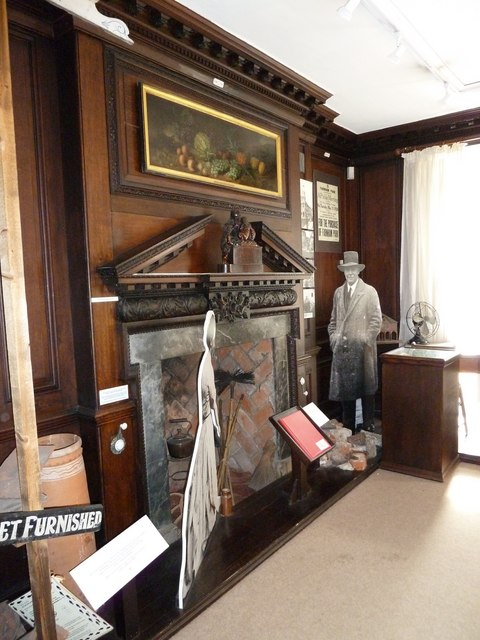
A fireplace

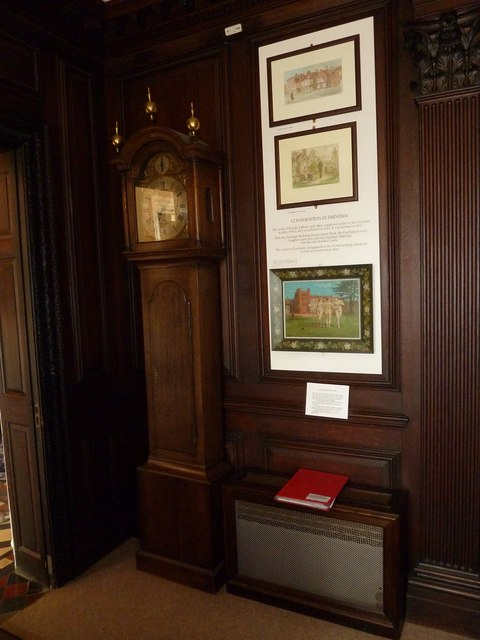
Wood panelling and tallcase clock

Willmer House is a grade I listed building in Farnham, Surrey, in England. Built in 1718 for a local hop merchant the building later became a school and dental surgery. Since 1961 it has housed the Museum of Farnham. The building was purchased by Waverley Borough Council from Surrey County Council in 2012. Willmer House is Baroque in style and features an elaborate red-brick façade, described by the Pevsner Architectural Guide as one of the finest in the country. Architectural historian Nathaniel Lloyd, in 1929, described the pilasters at either end of the façade as "perhaps the most beautiful example extant of the Doric order interpreted in brick".

A restoration of the façade in 2017 revealed it was in need of more significant repair than had been thought. Since 2018 scaffolding has been in place to protect the public from falling masonry. The council applied for Arts Council England funding in 2022 to part-fund the repairs.

== Description ==
Willmer House is a Baroque-style three-storey building with a facade of five bays facing West Street in Farnham, Surrey. It is constructed of red brick with detailing in moulded bricks. At either end of the façade are Doric-style brick pilasters. Architectural historian Nathaniel Lloyd described them in 1929 as "perhaps the most beautiful example extant of the Doric Order interpreted in brick". At the top of the first-floor level a string course is formed in moulded brick while a brick cornice runs along the top of the second floor. At the edge of the roof is a brick parapet, with piers between the bays. Ian Nairn, Nikolaus Pevsner and Bridget Cherry in the Pevsner Architectural Guide for Surrey describe Willmer House as having "one of the finest cut brick façades in the country", though note that while the individual features are impressive when combined they are somewhat lost in "a bewildering and rather forbidding tour de force".

The central bay protrudes towards the street and features the main entrance at ground-floor level. The door is wood with eight panels, it is surrounded by panelled pilasters, painted white, and surmounted by an entablature featuring a central cusp. The door is reached by two stone steps, though step-free disabled access is possible by an adjoining building. Because of the historic nature of the structure it has not been considered appropriate to install a lift or stair lift to provide step-free access to the upper floors. The windows are of the sash type. The windows on the upper two storeys have bolection moulded brick surrounds; those on the first floor are capped with segment-shaped moulding and those on the second storey with straight moulding. The ground-floor windows have plain surrounds.

Exploring Museums: The Home Counties, a 1990 work by Nell Hoare and Geoffrey Marsh for the Great Britain Museums and Galleries Commission, describes Willmer House as "one of the finest houses in the town". The interior features elaborate an Ionic pilaster and entablatured archway in the hall. A second doorway dividing a front and back room has Corinthian pilasters and carved spandrels. There is a fine oak staircase and period wood panelling and fireplaces. The garden features a bust of reforming local 19th-century member of parliament William Cobbett.

== History ==
Willmer House was built in 1718 as a house for the local hop merchant John Thorne, on land parcelled off in 1710. The site has earlier occupation as building work in 1992–93 revealed a late mediaeval chalk wall, probably used to retain a garden terrace, a brick-lined Tudor period well, a rubbish pit and a 17th-century cobbled surface and associated Purbeck Marble flagstone path. Pottery from the 13th and 14th centuries was also found. By the early Victorian period the house had become a private boarding school for boys. It later housed a girls school and a dental surgery.

The structure was first granted statutory protection as a listed building on 26 April 1950. It is currently grade I listed and forms a group with other listed buildings on the street. The eastern garden wall, of red brick, was separately listed, in grade II, on 29 December 1972.

Since 1961 the structure has housed the Museum of Farnham. Events were held in 2018 by the museum to celebrate the 300th anniversary of the building.

== 21st-century repairs ==
The structure was purchased by Waverley Borough Council from Surrey County Council in 2012. The new owners began a £92,000 restoration of the façade but this was halted in 2017 when the condition was found to be much worse than thought. The council was notified that significant repair work was required in 2018 and since then scaffolding has been erected to protect the public from any falling masonry, this has partially obscured the façade.

The costs of the repairs prohibited immediate work and had the potential to threaten the future of the museum in the building. In October 2021 Waverley Borough Council indicated that it intended to relinquish ownership of the museum to an independent trust, as it was judged to make applying for grants easier. In September 2022 the council bid for more than £600,000 of funding from the Arts Council England to restore the façade. If granted this would still leave a shortfall of around £200,000, towards which local councillors started a crowdfunding campaign.
