= Josephine Wall =

English fantasy artist and sculptor

- Born: May 1947 (age 79); Farnham, Surrey, UK
- Style: fantasy art, sculpture
- Website: www.josephinewall.co.uk

Josephine Wall (born May 1947 in Farnham, Surrey) is an English fantasy artist and sculptor.

== Biography ==
=== Early life ===
Educated at Farnham and Parkstone (Dorset) grammar schools, she studied at Bournemouth College and worked at Poole Pottery as a designer and painter of Delphis Ware. Her pottery figures include characters from Tolkien's The Lord of the Rings and mythological creatures. Pieces of this work now feature in a book on the history of Poole Pottery.

=== Paintings ===
Her paintings are mainly influenced and inspired by Arthur Rackham, with lesser influences from surrealist artists such as Magritte and Dalí, and the romanticism of the pre-Raphaelites.

A number of her works were exhibited in Teheran and Tokyo during 1974 and her first solo exhibition took place the following year in Swindon. Josephine and her paintings were the subject of a special feature on Southern Television in 1990. Following a visit to the Spring Fair in Birmingham in 1993 she signed contracts with firms in Britain and Switzerland to publish her work as prints, posters and cards for worldwide distribution.

In addition to a range of Limited Edition Prints, Josephine Wall continues to work with her exclusive licensing agents Art Impressions in California who began licensing her work around the world in 1996. They are responsible for finding the contacts and setting up licensing deals. It has been used for greeting cards, calendars, posters, stained glass, craft transfers (T shirts), journals, stationery, cheques and cheque covers, mugs, magnets, suncatchers, treasure boxes, wall murals, scrapbook paper sets, fabric squares, figurines, and puzzles.

In 1998 five original works were selected for an exhibition at London's Mall Gallery entitled "Art of the Imagination". Josephine has subsequently joined the circle of artists in the society of the same name.

Since then her works have been selected by Ron and Yvette Emard (Founders of Courtyard of Romance) for exhibitions at New York Art Expo and have been the subject of a book The Fantasy World of Josephine Wall, jointly published by the artist and Courtyard of Romance. Pop singer Britney Spears has used a number of Josephine's images on her website. Britney also purchased a number of Limited Edition prints and Josephine is working on an original painting for her. Ron and Yvette Emard have also been featured in at least two of Josephine's paintings and are the proud owners of the largest private collection of Josephine Wall originals in the world.

=== Timeline ===
- 1967 – Following three years at Bournemouth College studying Fine Art, Josephine worked at Poole Pottery as a designer and painter of Delphis Ware (now very collectable), later modelling animals to be displayed at Harrods in London. Her pottery figures include characters from Tolkien's The Lord of the Rings and mythological creatures. Certain pieces of this work now form part of a book on the history of Poole Pottery.
- 1974 – A number of larger paintings were exhibited in Teheran and Tokyo.
- 1975 – Held her first solo exhibition in Swindon.
- 1990 – Following a period during which she brought up her three children whilst still exhibiting both locally and abroad, a second solo exhibition was held at the Mayfield Gallery in Bournemouth. Also during this year, Josephine and her paintings were the subject of a special feature on Southern Television in the UK.
- 1991 - Held her third solo exhibition at the Mayfield Gallery.
- 1993 – Following a visit to the Spring Fair in Birmingham she signed contracts with F. J. Warren based in Hitchen, England and Wizard and Genius from Switzerland to publish her work in the form of framing prints, posters and cards. These prints are distributed worldwide.
- 1995 – Josephine's painting "Dance of all Seasons" was selected for the cover of W&G's "Cheerful Joys" catalogue.
- 1996 – Signed a licensing agreement with Art Impressions based in Los Angeles, California, which has led to many new outlets for Josephine's images. Many products are now produced including cards, stationery, puzzles, journals, bookplates, back to school products, mugs, needlepoint kits and posters, as well as limited edition prints.
- 1998 – Five original works were selected for an exhibition at London's Mall Gallery entitled "Art of the Imagination". Josephine has subsequently joined the circle of artists in the society of the same name, with the possibility of many more exhibitions worldwide.
- 1999 – Many products are now produced including cards, stationery, puzzles, journals, bookplates, back to school products, mugs, needlepoint kits and posters, as well as limited edition prints.
- 2004 – First exhibition at the New York Art Expo, resulting in 6 images being selected for use as Hand Embellished Limited Edition Prints for sale at auctions on board cruise ships around the world.
- 2005 – Exhibition at New York Art Expo at which my first book was released The Fantasy World of Josephine Wall.
- 2006 – Leanin' Tree requested a series of "Zodiac" images which were completed in 6 months, and have proved to be very popular. They were exhibited all together at Courtenays Fine Art Gallery in Westbourne. Seven were sold that evening, and the rest soon followed.
