= Farnham =

Market town in Surrey, England

Coordinates: 51°12′54″N 0°47′56″W

- Market town and civil parish
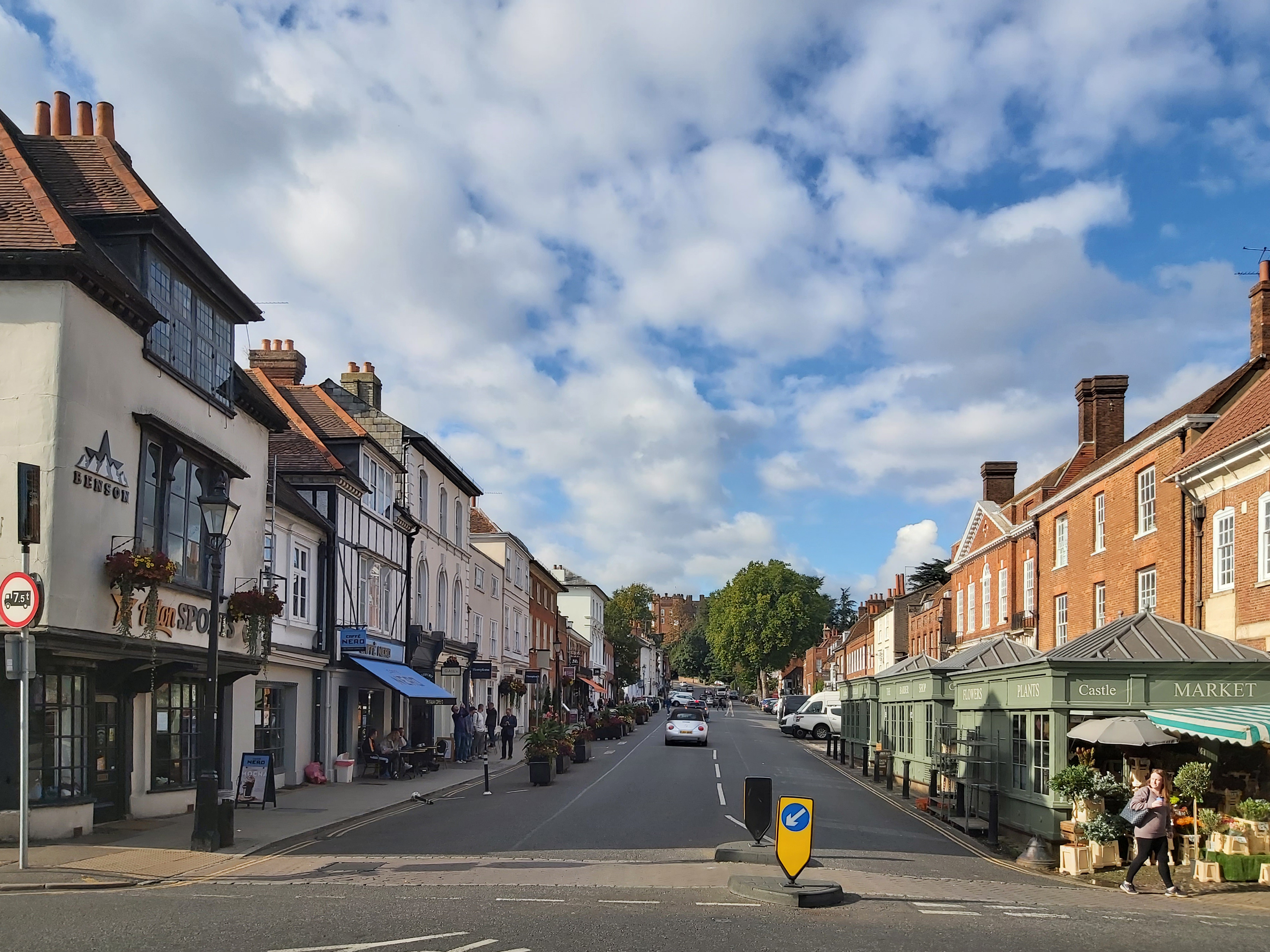
- Castle Street

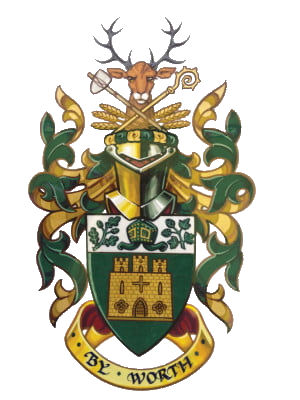
- Coat of arms Motto: 'By Worth'

- Location within Surrey
- Area: 36.52 km^{2} (14.10 sq mi)
- Population: 39,488 (civil parish)
  - Density: 1,081/km^{2} (2,800/sq mi)
- OS grid reference: SU8447
- Civil parish: Farnham
- District: Waverley
- Shire county: Surrey
- Region: South East
- Country: England
- Sovereign state: United Kingdom
- Post town: Farnham
- Postcode district: GU9
- Dialling code: 01252
- Police: Surrey
- Fire: Surrey
- Ambulance: South East Coast
- UK Parliament: Farnham and Bordon

Farnham is a market town and civil parish in Surrey, England, around 36 miles (58 km) southwest of London. It is in the Borough of Waverley, close to the county border with Hampshire. The town is on the north branch of the River Wey, a tributary of the Thames, and is at the western end of the North Downs. The civil parish, which includes the villages of Badshot Lea, Hale and Wrecclesham, covers 14.1 sq mi (37 km^{2}) and had a population of 39,488 in 2011.

Among the prehistoric objects from the area is a woolly mammoth tusk, excavated in Badshot Lea at the start of the 21st century. The earliest evidence of human activity is from the Neolithic and, during the Roman period, tile making took place close to the town centre. The name "Farnham" is of Saxon origin and is generally agreed to mean "meadow where ferns grow". From at least 803, the settlement was under the control of the Bishops of Winchester and the castle was built as a residence for Bishop Henry de Blois in 1138. Henry VIII is thought to have spent part of his childhood under the care of Bishop Richard Foxe and is known to have lived at Farnham Castle when he was 16.

In the late medieval period, the primary local industry was the production of kersey, a coarse, woollen cloth. In the early modern period, the town's weekly corn market was said to be the second largest in England after London. Between 1600 and the 1970s, the area was a centre for growing hops and for the brewing industry. The town began to expand in the early Victorian period, stimulated in part by the opening of the railway in 1849 and the arrival of the army in nearby Aldershot in 1855. Farnham became an Urban District in 1894, but under the Local Government Act 1972, it became part of the Borough of Waverley. The civil parish and town council were created in 1984.

The Farnham area has long been associated with the creative arts and with pottery making in particular. One of three campuses of the University for the Creative Arts is to the west of the centre and there are numerous works of public art on display in the town. Notable buildings in the civil parish include the ruins of Waverley Abbey and the 18th century Willmer House, now the location of the Museum of Farnham. Politician William Cobbett and writer George Sturt were both born in Farnham, as was Maud Gonne, the Irish republican suffragette. More recent residents have included the watercolour artist William Herbert Allen, Formula One driver Mike Hawthorn, the England cricketer Graham Thorpe, and the England rugby union captain Jonny Wilkinson.

== Toponymy ==
The oldest surviving record of Farnham is from a c. 1150 copy of a c. 688 charter, in which the settlement appears as Fernham. The name is written as Fearnhamme in the Anglo-Saxon Chronicle from c. 900 and as Ferneham in Domesday Book. The town first appears with its modern spelling "Farnham" in 1233. The name is thought to derive from the Old English words fearn and ham and is generally agreed to mean "homestead or enclosure where ferns grow". Alternatively the second part could derive from hamm, meaning "river meadow".

== Geography ==
Farnham's history and present status are mainly the result of its geography; a combination of river, streams, fresh water springs and varied soils, together with a temperate climate, was attractive in prehistoric times. The geology of the area continues to influence the town, both in terms of communications, scenic and botanic variety and the main local industries of agriculture and minerals extraction. Farnham Geological Society is an active organisation in the town, and the Museum of Farnham has a collection of geological samples and fossils.

Farnham lies in the valley of the North Branch of the River Wey, which rises near Alton, merges with the South Branch at Tilford, and joins the River Thames at Weybridge. The mainly east–west alignment of the ridges and valleys has influenced the development of road and rail communications. The most prominent geological feature is the chalk of the North Downs which forms a ridge (the Hog's Back) to the east of the town, and continues through Farnham Park to the north of the town centre, and westwards to form the Hampshire Downs. The land rises to more than 180 metres (590 feet) above sea level (ASL) to the north of the town at Caesar's Camp which, with the northern part of the park, lies on gravel beds. There are a number of swallow holes in the park where this stratum meets the chalk. The historic core of the town lies on gravel beds at an altitude of roughly 70 metres (230 ft) ASL on an underlying geology of Gault Clay and Upper Greensand and the southern part of the town rises to more than 100 metres (330 feet) on the Lower Greensand.

=== Climate ===
Farnham has a temperate maritime climate, free from extreme temperatures, with moderate rainfall and often breezy conditions. The nearest official weather station to Farnham is Alice Holt Lodge, just under 3 1/2 miles (6 kilometres) southwest of the town centre.

The highest temperature recorded was 35.4 °C (95.7 °F), in July 2006. In an 'average' year, the warmest day would reach 26.3 °C (79.3 °F), with 18.1 days attaining a temperature of 25.1 °C (77.2 °F) or higher.

The lowest temperature recorded was −14.0 °C (6.8 °F) in February 1986. On average, 57.7 nights of the year will register an air frost.

Annual rainfall averages 821mm, with at least 1mm of rain reported on 126.0 days. All averages refer to the 1991–2020 observation period.

Climate data for Alice Holt Lodge, elevation 115m, 1991–2020, extremes 1960-
Month	Jan	Feb	Mar	Apr	May	Jun	Jul	Aug	Sep	Oct	Nov	Dec	Year
Record high °C (°F)	15.0 (59.0)	17.0 (62.6)	21.1 (70.0)	25.8 (78.4)	27.6 (81.7)	34.2 (93.6)	35.4 (95.7)	35.1 (95.2)	28.9 (84.0)	24.0 (75.2)	18.1 (64.6)	14.7 (58.5)	35.4 (95.7)
Mean daily maximum °C (°F)	7.6 (45.7)	8.2 (46.8)	11.0 (51.8)	14.1 (57.4)	17.5 (63.5)	20.3 (68.5)	22.5 (72.5)	21.9 (71.4)	19.0 (66.2)	14.8 (58.6)	10.5 (50.9)	8.0 (46.4)	14.6 (58.3)
Mean daily minimum °C (°F)	1.3 (34.3)	1.3 (34.3)	2.4 (36.3)	3.9 (39.0)	6.8 (44.2)	9.5 (49.1)	11.5 (52.7)	11.4 (52.5)	9.2 (48.6)	6.7 (44.1)	3.7 (38.7)	1.6 (34.9)	5.8 (42.4)
Record low °C (°F)	−13.6 (7.5)	−14 (7)	−10.6 (12.9)	−6 (21)	−3.3 (26.1)	0.5 (32.9)	3.5 (38.3)	3.1 (37.6)	−0.8 (30.6)	−6.0 (21.2)	−7.6 (18.3)	−12.9 (8.8)	−14 (7)
Average precipitation mm (inches)	89.7 (3.53)	63.8 (2.51)	54.3 (2.14)	57.5 (2.26)	51.3 (2.02)	51.3 (2.02)	52.2 (2.06)	57.7 (2.27)	60.9 (2.40)	92.2 (3.63)	99.8 (3.93)	90.6 (3.57)	821.3 (32.34)
Average rainy days	13.3	10.8	10.0	9.7	8.8	8.5	8.7	8.7	9.2	11.8	13.8	12.7	126
Source 1: Meteoclimat
Source 2: Metoffice

== History ==
=== Prehistory ===
==== Stone Age ====
Farnham's history extends back hundreds of thousands of years to the hunter-gatherers of the Paleolithic or early Stone Age, on the basis of stone tools such as many Handaxes found around the town. Most of these were collected by antiquarians in the later 19th and early 20th Century. Additionally prehistoric animal bones, sometimes found together with the aforementioned flint tools in deep gravel pits such as a woolly mammoth tusk, excavated in Badshot Lea at the start of the 21st century. The first known settlement in the area was in the Mesolithic period, some 7,000 years ago; a cluster of pit dwellings and evidence of a flint-knapping industry from that period has been excavated a short distance to the east of the town. There was a Neolithic long barrow at nearby Badshot Lea, now destroyed by quarrying. This monument lay on the route of the prehistoric trackway known as the Harrow Way or Harroway, which passes through Farnham Park, and a sarsen stone still stands nearby, which is believed to have marked the safe crossing point of a marshy area near the present Shepherd and Flock roundabout.

==== Bronze Age ====
Occupation of the area continued to grow through the Bronze Age. Two bronze hoards have been discovered on Crooksbury Hill, and further artefacts have been found, particularly at sites in Green Lane and near the Bourne spring in Farnham Park. A significant number of Bronze Age barrows occur in the area, including a triple barrow at Elstead and an urnfield cemetery at Stoneyfield, near the Tilford road.

==== Iron Age ====
Hill forts from the early Iron Age have been identified locally at Botany Hill to the south of the town, and at Caesar's Camp to the north. The latter is a very large earthwork on a high promontory, served by a spring which emerges from between two conglomerate boulders called the Jock and Jenny Stones. "Soldier's Ring" earthworks on Crooksbury Hill date from the later Iron Age. The final era of the Iron Age, during the 1st century AD, found Farnham within the territory of the Belgic tribe Atrebates led by Commius, a former ally of Caesar, who had brought his tribe to Britain following a dispute with the Romans. A hut dating from this period was discovered at the Bourne Spring and other occupation material has been discovered at various sites, particularly Green Lane.

=== Roman Britain ===
During the Roman period the district became a pottery centre due to the plentiful supply of gault clay, oak woodlands for fuel, and good communications via the Harrow Way and the nearby Roman road from Silchester to Chichester. Kilns dating from about AD 100 have been found throughout the area, including Six Bells (near the Bourne Spring), Snailslynch and Mavins Road, but the main centre of pottery had been Alice Holt Forest, on the edge of the town, since about AD 50, just 7 years after the arrival of the Romans. The Alice Holt potteries continued in use, making mainly domestic wares, until about AD 400. Near the Bourne Spring two Roman buildings were discovered; one was a bath-house dating from about AD 270 and the other a house of later date. The Roman Way housing estate stands on this site. William Stukeley propounded that Farnham is the site of the lost Roman settlement of Vindomis, although this is now believed to be at Neatham, near Alton. Large hoards of Roman coins have been discovered some 10 miles (16 km) south-west of Farnham in Woolmer Forest and a temple has been excavated at Wanborough, about 8 miles (13 km) to the east.

=== The Anglo-Saxon period ===
In the 7th century, Surrey passed into the hands of King Caedwalla of Wessex, who also conquered Kent and Sussex, and founded a monastery at Farnham in 686.

It was the Anglo-Saxons who gave the town its name—Farnham and it is listed as Fearnhamme in the Anglo-Saxon Chronicle. They arrived in the 6th century and, in AD 688, the West Saxon King Caedwalla donated the district around Farnham to the Church, and to the diocese of Winchester. A Saxon community grew up in the valley by the river. By the year 803 Farnham had passed into the ownership of the Bishop of Winchester and the Manor of Farnham remained so (apart from two short breaks) for the next thousand years. Although Farnham is documented in Saxon texts and most of the local names are derived from their language, there is only one fully attested Saxon site in Farnham, just off the lower part of Firgrove Hill, where a road called Saxon Croft is now sited. Here several Saxon weaving huts from about AD 550 were discovered in 1924.

In 892 Surrey was the scene of another major battle when a large Danish army, variously reported at 200, 250 and 350 ship-loads, moved west from its encampment in Kent and raided in Hampshire and Berkshire. Withdrawing with their loot, the Danes were intercepted and defeated at Farnham by an army led by Alfred the Great's son, the future Edward the Elder, and fled across the Thames towards Essex.

==== The Hundred of Farnham ====
A hundred (county subdivision) was an area that had a general overlord of its lords of the manor, entitled to charge certain rents to certain intermediate lords. Parishes within Farnham hundred were: Frensham (including tything Pitfold with Churt) (partly in the hundred of Alton) Elstead, the liberty of Dockenfield, the liberty of Waverley, Seal (now Seale) the tythings of Badshot, Runfold, Culverlands, Tilford with Culverlands, Farnham, Runwick, Wrecklesham (now Wrecclesham), and Bourne.

In the 14th century, Farnham hundred was owned by the Bishop of Winchester and was one of the wealthiest on the bishop's rolls.

See also, in this context:

- Surrey § Medieval Surrey
- List of hundreds of England

=== After the Norman invasion ===
Farnham appears in Domesday Book of 1086 in the Hundred of Farnham as Ferneham, one of the five great "minster" churches in Surrey. Its Domesday assets were: 40 hides; 1 church, 6 mills worth £2 6s 0d, 43 ploughs, 35 acres (140,000 m^{2}) of meadow, woodland worth 175½ hogs. It rendered £53.

Waverley Abbey, the first Cistercian abbey in England, was founded in 1128 by William Giffard, Bishop of Winchester about one mile (1.6 km) south of the town centre. King John visited Waverley in 1208, and Henry III in 1225. The abbey produced the famous Annals of Waverley, an important reference source for the period. By the end of the 13th century the abbey was becoming less important. By the time it was suppressed by Henry VIII in 1536 as part of the dissolution of the monasteries there were only thirteen monks in the community.

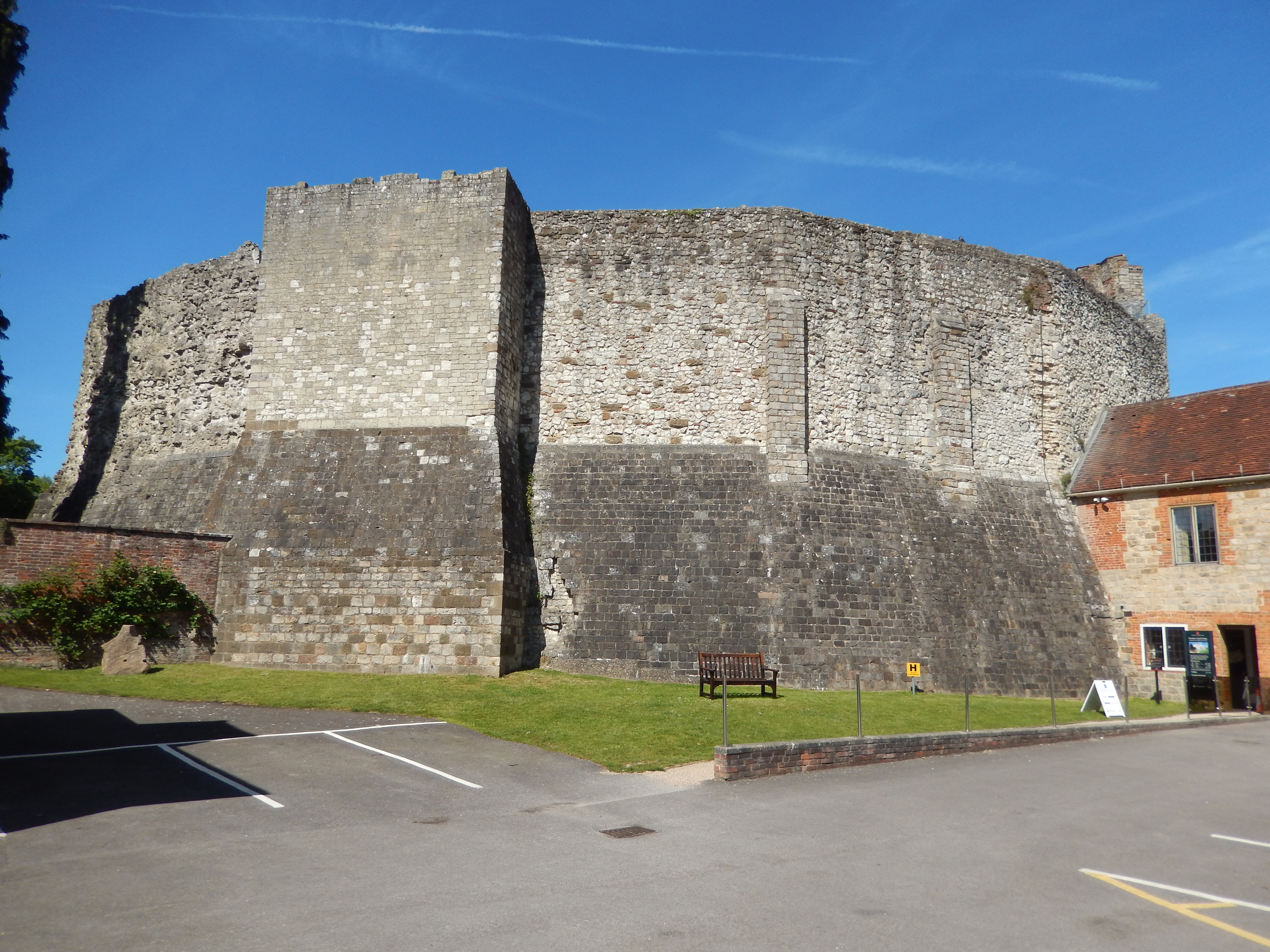
The keep and entrance to Farnham Castle

The town is midway between Winchester and London and, in 1138, Henry de Blois (grandson of William the Conqueror and brother of King Stephen) started building Farnham Castle to provide accommodation for the Bishop of Winchester in his frequent journeying between his cathedral and the capital. The castle's garrison provided a market for farms and small industries in the town, accelerating its growth. Three miles (five kilometres) west of the town is Barley Pound, the remains of an 11th-century precursor of Farnham Castle.

Farnham was granted its charter as a town in 1249 by William de Ralegh, then Bishop of Winchester.

The Blind Bishop's Steps, a series of steps leading along Castle Street up to the Castle, were originally constructed for Bishop Richard Foxe (godfather of Henry VIII).

The Black Death hit Farnham in 1348, killing about 1,300 people, at that time about a third of the population. In 1625 Farnham was again subject to an outbreak of the plague which, together with a severe decline in the local woollen industry (the local downland wool being unsuitable for the newly fashionable worsted) led by the 1640s to a serious economic depression in the area. Local wool merchants were, like merchants throughout the country, heavily taxed by Charles I to pay for his increasingly unpopular policies.

=== The Civil War ===
Against this background the English Civil War began, with Farnham playing a major part. Here, support for the Parliamentarians was general. The castle was considered a potential rallying point for Royalists, resulting in the installation of a Roundhead garrison there in 1642. As the King's forces moved southwards, taking Oxford, Reading and Windsor, the garrison commander at Farnham (a noted poet), Captain George Wither, decided to evacuate the castle; the new High Sheriff of Surrey (John Denham, a Royalist sympathiser and another noted poet) then occupied the vacant castle with 100 armed supporters. With the castle and much of the surrounding area in Royalist hands, Parliament despatched Colonel Sir William Waller to Farnham to retake the castle. The defenders refused to surrender but Waller's men used a petard to destroy the castle gates and overcame them, with only one fatality, and took the High Sheriff prisoner.

The following year, as the Royalists strengthened their position west of Farnham, the garrison at Farnham Castle was strengthened when it became the headquarters of the Farnham regiment of foot or "Greencoats", with some eight to nine hundred officers and men, supported by a number of troops of horse. Further reinforcement by three regiments from London, 4,000 strong under Waller's command arrived in Farnham that October prior to an unsuccessful foray to recapture Winchester from the Royalists. Eight thousand Royalists under Ralph Hopton (a former friend of Waller) advanced on Farnham from the west and skirmishes took place on the outskirts of town. Despite further reinforcement for Waller from Kent, Hopton's entire army gathered on the heathland just outside Farnham Park. There was some skirmishing but Hopton's men withdrew. Through the next few years Farnham was an important centre of Parliamentary operations and the garrison cost Farnham people dearly in terms of local taxes, provisioning and quartering; even the lead from the Town Hall roof had been requisitioned to make bullets. A number of local women were widowed following the pressing of local men into the militia. The bombardment of Basing House was by a train of heavy cannon assembled at Farnham from other areas and, in 1646, most of the garrison was removed from Farnham to form a brigade to besiege Donnington Castle near Newbury. The King surrendered shortly afterwards at Newark and a small garrison remained at Farnham.

In 1647, having escaped from custody at Hampton Court, the King rode through Farnham at dawn on 12 November with a small party of loyal officers, en route to the Isle of Wight, where he sought sanctuary under the protection of Colonel Robert Hammond, a Parliamentarian officer but with Royalist sympathies. The following March, Oliver Cromwell stayed at Farnham for discussions concerning the marriage of his daughter to a Hampshire gentleman, although some historians have speculated that this was cover for secret negotiations with the King.

Following the rebellion during the summer of 1648 the keep was partially dismantled at the orders of Cromwell, to make further occupation by garrison indefensible. In late November that year Hammond was summoned to Farnham, where he was arrested and the King was removed under military escort to the mainland. On 20 December the King and his escort entered Farnham, where groups of men, women and children gathered at the roadside to welcome him and touch his hand. That night the King lodged at Culver Hall (now Vernon House) in West Street before the party continued to London for Charles's trial and execution in January 1649. The King gave his night cap to Henry Vernon, owner of Culver Hall, "as a token of Royal favour". Records show that the following period of interregnum until restoration of the monarchy in 1660 was a time of prosperity and growth for Farnham. In 1660 the bishops of Winchester were restored to the adjoining Bishops Palace, which remained their residence until 1927. From 1927 until 1955 it was a residence of the bishops of the newly created diocese of Guildford. The castle is currently owned by English Heritage.

=== Post-Restoration ===
Farnham became a successful market town; the author Daniel Defoe wrote that Farnham had the greatest corn-market after London, and describes 1,100 fully laden wagons delivering wheat to the town on market day. During the 17th century, other new industries evolved: greenware pottery (a pottery, dating from 1873, still exists on the outskirts of the town), wool and cloth, the processing of wheat into flour, and eventually hops, a key ingredient of beer.

The Anglican divine, Augustus Montague Toplady, author of the hymn Rock of Ages (1763, at Blagston) was born in Farnham in 1740 – a plaque now marks the building on West Street where he was born.

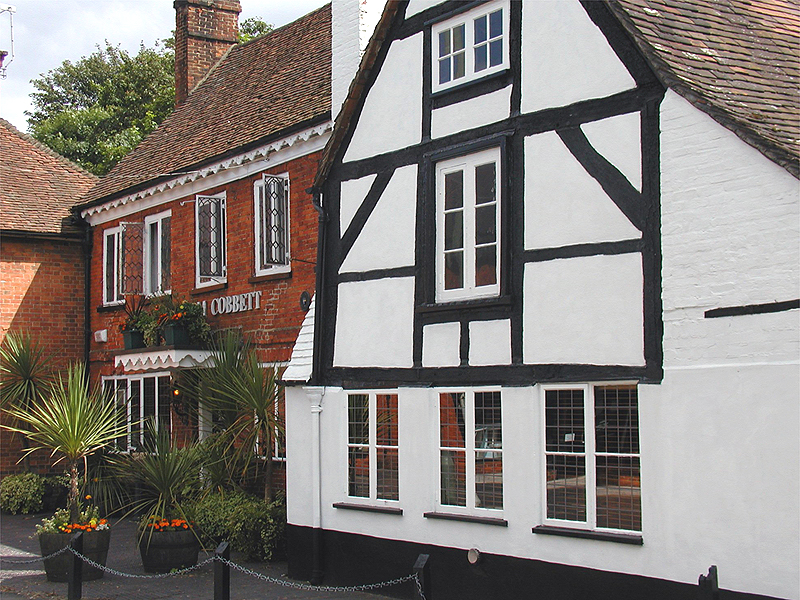
William Cobbett's birthplace

The radical MP, soldier, farmer, journalist and publisher William Cobbett was born in Farnham in 1763, in a pub called the Jolly Farmer. The pub still stands, and has since been renamed the William Cobbett.

The London and South Western Railway arrived in 1848, and in 1854 neighbouring Aldershot became the "Home of the British Army". Both events had a significant effect on Farnham. The fast link with London meant city businessmen could think of having a house in the country and still being in close contact with the office; so Farnham became an early "commuter town". The railway did not reach Aldershot until 1870; until then, soldiers would take a train to Farnham station and then march to Aldershot. Many officers and their families chose to billet in Farnham itself. The railway was electrified by the Southern Railway company in 1937 as far as Alton, and a carriage shed for the new electric stock was built in Weydon Lane. This building, which carried fading camouflage paint for many years after World War II, was replaced in 2006.

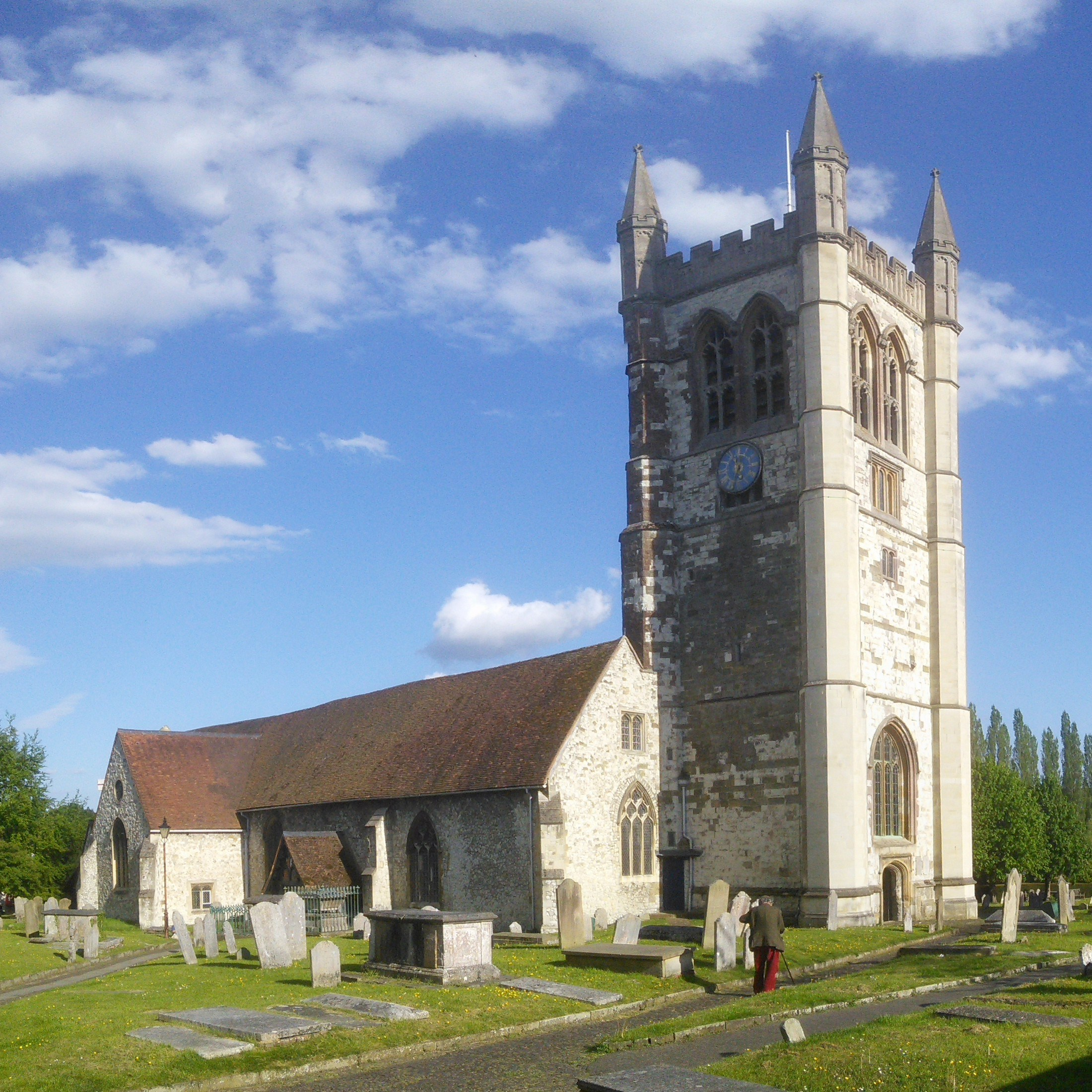
St Andrew's Parish Church

In 1895 Farnham Urban District Council (FUDC) was formed. In 1930 the council purchased Farnham Park, a large park occupying much of the former castle grounds. That same year, St Joan of Arc Church was built on Waverley Lane; it was dedicated to St Joan of Arc because Farnham Castle was a residence of Cardinal Henry Beaufort who presided over the saint's trial. The FUDC was abolished in 1973 by the Local Government Act of the previous year. Farnham, together with Hindhead, Haslemere, Cranleigh and surrounding areas, was absorbed into the new Waverley District Council (latterly Waverley Borough Council) with its headquarters in Godalming. In 1984 Farnham Parish Council became Farnham Town Council, taking on some of the minor roles of the former FUDC from Waverley.

Farnham Maltings, Bridge Square was once a tannery; the site expanded to become part of the Farnham United Breweries, which included its own maltings. It was taken over by a major brewer (Courage); brewing ceased, but malting continued into the 1960s, when Courage planned to sell off the site for redevelopment. The people of Farnham raised enough money to buy the building so that it could be converted into a community centre for the town. Other buildings in Farnham once linked to the Farnham Maltings include The Oasthouse (now offices) in Mead Lane and The Hop Kiln (now private residences) on Weydon Lane.

== Transport ==
=== Rail ===
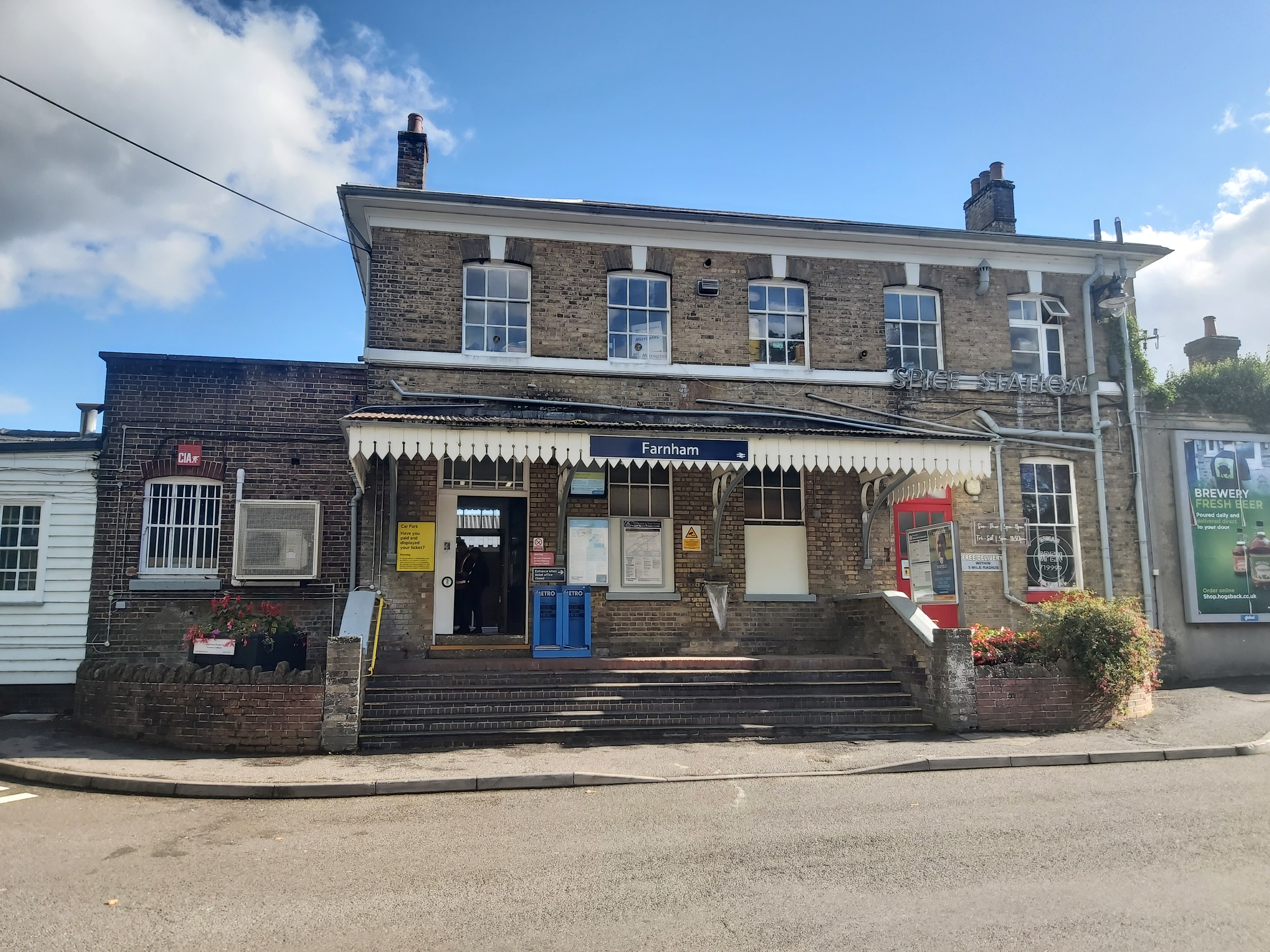
Front of Farnham railway station

Farnham railway station is served by South Western Railway services between Alton and Waterloo. South Western Railway also manage the station. Services to Guildford are facilitated by a line running in that direction. The Alton Line becomes a single track between Farnham and Alton station. The station formerly served as the terminus for the Tongham railway until passenger services ceased in July 1937.

=== Roads ===
The A31 Farnham bypass links the town by road to Winchester, Alton and Guildford; the A325 links the town to Farnborough and to the A3 (London-Portsmouth) at Greatham. The A287 links Farnham to the M3 at Hook and the A3 at Hindhead.

=== Buses ===
Farnham is served by several bus routes, the majority of bus services originate from Aldershot bus station and are run by Stagecoach. The Waverley Hoppa provides demand-responsive transport for travel between Farnham and the surrounding villages.

=== Air ===
The nearest airport for business passengers is Farnborough Airport. The nearest major airport is London Heathrow Airport which is 31 miles (50 km) by road. Gatwick Airport and Southampton Airport are each about 43 miles (69 km) away by main roads.

=== Recreational routes ===
Farnham is the western starting point of the North Downs Way National Trail, which is predominantly footpath. The Pilgrims Way which follows long sections of the North Downs Way traditionally runs from Winchester to Canterbury. The footpath known as St. Swithun's Way has created a more pleasant route to Winchester than the modern road network which constitutes a lot of the Pilgrims Way.
The southern suburb of Rowledge lies adjacent to the north western fringes of the South Downs National Park.

National Cycle Route 22 passes through Farnham, connecting it to Guildford, East Surrey, Isle of Wight and the New Forest.

== Economy ==
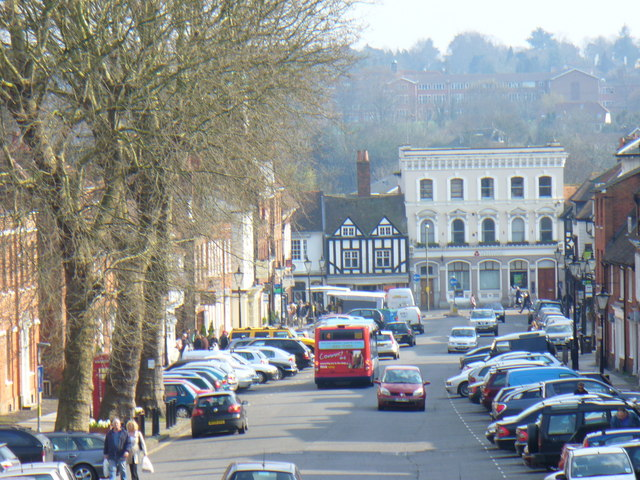
Castle Street

Farnham is a market town with many shops located along the main thoroughfare running through West Street, The Borough and East Street. The town has a significant number of independent retailers, some of which have been in business since the 19th century, such as Rangers Furnishing Stores (est. 1895), Elphicks department store (est. 1881) and Pullingers (est. 1850). The latter evolved into the Pullingers Art Shop chain and is thought to be Farnham's oldest surviving business. There are also branches of many national retailers and grocery markets.

Castle Street's market stalls have been replaced by semi-permanent "orangery" style buildings. Once a month a farmers' market is held in the central car park where produce from farms in Farnham and the surrounding area is sold. The Farnham Maltings hosts a monthly market selling arts, crafts, antiques and bric-a-brac with specialist fairs and festivals held there on a less regular basis.

== Public services ==
=== Public library ===
Farnham Library moved to its current site in the grounds of Vernon House in April 1990. Refurbished in November 2005, it is a community lending library service run by Surrey County Council. The library is housed in the historic Vernon House at which King Charles I slept on his way to his trial and execution in London in 1649, commemorated by a plaque on the building wall. The library features public gardens with sculptures provided by local artists and UCA students.

=== Museum of Farnham ===
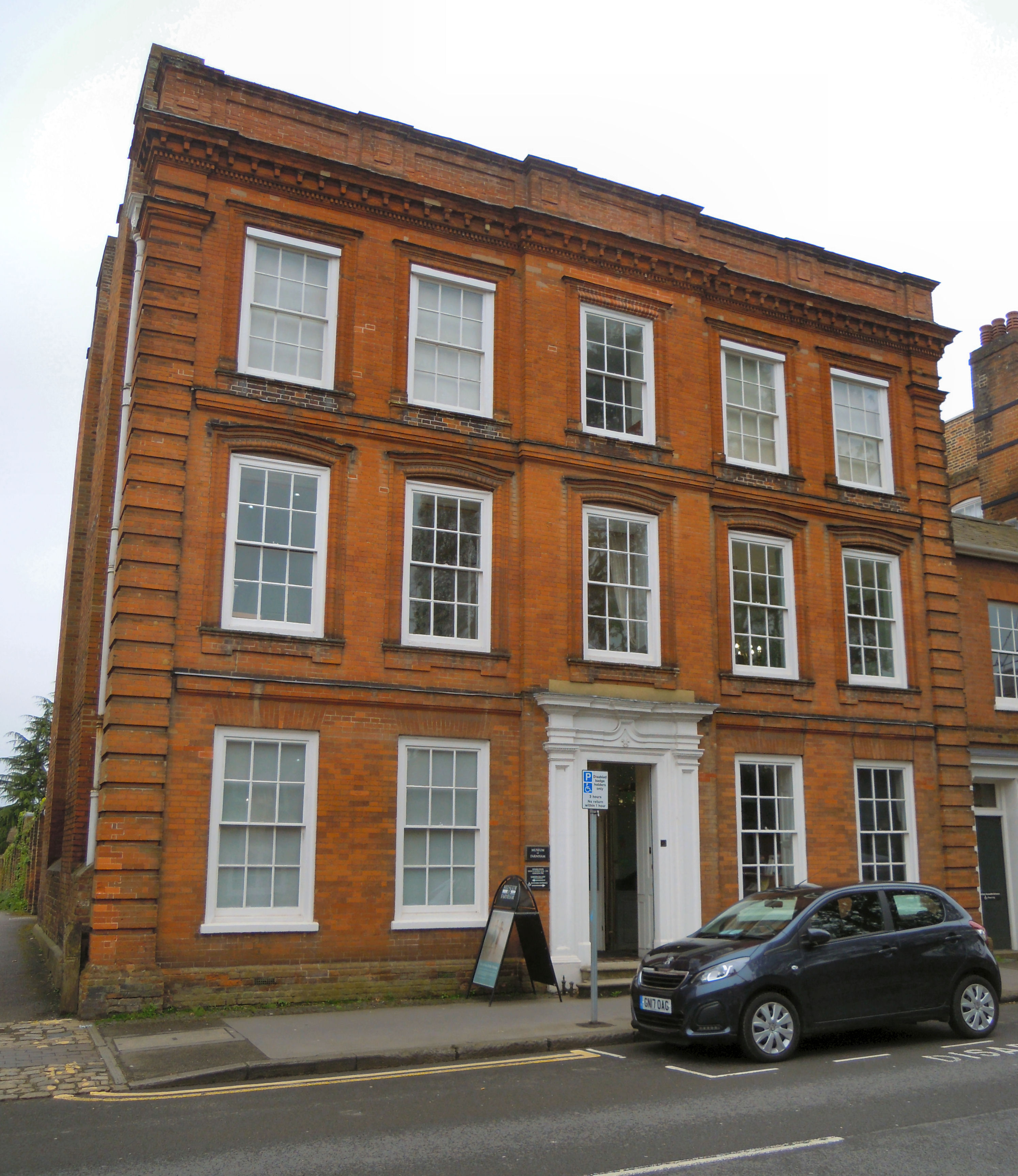
The Museum of Farnham in 2018

The Museum of Farnham is located at Willmer House, an 18th-century town house with a decorative brickwork façade in West Street. It houses a collection of artefacts spanning several periods of the town's history and prehistory.

The museum was founded in 1961 to provide the Farnham community with a collection dedicated to the history of the local area in an elegant Grade I listed Georgian townhouse which still retains many original features, including a walled garden. The displays include items from a large and eclectic collection; from archaeological artefacts to nationally important artworks by local artists and an extensive costume collection. The museum has a Local Studies Library.

=== Leisure and recreation ===
There are two main parks in Farnham town centre: Farnham Park and Gostrey Meadow. Farnham Park is adjacent to Farnham Castle. Gostrey Meadow is in the centre of Farnham, next to the river Wey, and includes a fenced children's play area. There is a skate park and leisure centre next to the town centre.

=== Hospital ===
Farnham Hospital is directly north east of the town. It was once the main hospital in the area, including accident and emergency services, but that role is now taken by Frimley Park Hospital. Farnham once had a second hospital which was at the end of Bardsley Drive, on the site which is now Lynton Close.

=== Cemeteries ===
The town has four cemeteries, all maintained by Farnham Town Council: Hale Cemetery in Upper Hale; Badshot Lea Cemetery on Badshot Lea Road; Green Lane Cemetery and the West Street Cemetery.

== Tourism ==
The town has a number of attractive houses from various periods, and many passages which reveal hidden parts of the town including old workshops, historic cottages and hidden gardens. Farnham Castle was built by the Normans and updated over the years as the Palace of the Bishops of Winchester. The former Bishops' Palace of the castle is now a training and conference centre, which also manages the keep, recently made more accessible by a Heritage Lottery Fund Grant. The keep is open to the public, and organised tours of the palace are held weekly.

Many of the places mentioned in the books of George Sturt can be seen, and Waverley Abbey, the first Cistercian Abbey in England, is open to the public. Farnham borders the Surrey Hills National Landscape and the North Downs Way long-distance path starts here. Alice Holt Forest is nearby, as are Frensham Ponds and many heaths and downland scenery. The Rural Life Living Museum is nearby at Tilford, and the town is a suitable tourist base for Winchester, the Mid-Hants Railway and canal trips on the Basingstoke Canal and Wey Navigation.

== Culture ==
Farnham has a strong association with the creative arts. Farnham School of Art opened in 1866 and was associated with the Arts and Crafts movement when architects such as Edwin Lutyens and Harold Falkner, painters such as George Watts and W. H. Allen, potters such as Mary Watts and landscape gardeners such as Gertrude Jekyll worked in the area. Farnham has several art galleries: the New Ashgate Gallery in Lower Church Lane has exhibitions by established and new artists in a variety of media, the exhibition changing on the first Saturday of each month. The gallery at Farnham Maltings also has frequent exhibitions.

=== Entertainment ===
Farnham Maltings has diverse concerts including opera, folk and acoustic music gigs, band evenings and stand up comedy nights, as well as shows and workshops for younger people. There is a cinema run every Wednesday at the Maltings. The Maltings hosts an "Acoustic Fridays" evening once a month. A regular blues night takes place in the "Cellar Bar" and the whole venue is taken over for the annual Blues Festival. In keeping with the town's historical link with hop-growing and beer, the Farnham Maltings holds the Farnham Beer Exhibition, an annual event that started in 1977, known as "Farnham Beerex". There are many pubs in Farnham, many of which have live music regularly.

Farnham has an annual carnival, usually held on the last Saturday in June, organised by two charitable service organisations, the Farnham Lions Club and The Hedgehogs. Castle Street is closed for the evening, with bands playing on a stage in the street, a beer tent, barbecue, and sideshows. A procession of carnival floats, marching bands, tableaux, trade floats and classic vehicles parade through the main streets of the town. Local schools also participate in the parade, which has a different theme each year. Staff of the local Kar Ling Kwong Chinese restaurant traditionally perform the Lion Dance each year as part of the parade, the restaurant closed in February 2019. There is also a smaller Hale Carnival which takes place in the village of Hale in the North of Farnham. This is usually held on the first Saturday of July.

=== The arts ===
William Herbert Allen, the notable English landscape watercolour artist, lived and worked in Farnham for most of his career. He was Master of Farnham Art School from 1889 to 1927 and many of his works depict landscapes of the Farnham area. Illustrator Pauline Baynes spent much of her childhood in Farnham and trained at the Farnham School of Art. A popular fantasy artist, Josephine Wall, was born and educated in the town.

Since Roman times the wealden clay of the area has been exploited for pottery and brickmaking. Pottery continued on a small-scale commercial basis until the closure of Farnham Pottery at Wrecclesham in 1998, when it passed to the Farnham Buildings Preservation Trust. Farnham Pottery, in addition to utility wares, became famous during the Arts and Crafts movement for their decorative wares, either hand-thrown or moulded and decorated in a variety of coloured glazes, particularly "Farnham Greenware". There was close co-operation between the pottery and Farnham School of Art (now a campus of University for the Creative Arts).

The Castle Theatre in Castle Street was replaced by the Redgrave Theatre in 1974 which, itself, closed down in 1998 due to the decline of repertory theatre in England. In 1998 'The New Farnham Repertory Company', now renamed Farnham Rep, was formed to carry on the tradition of repertory theatre in the town. The Farnham Theatre Association campaigns for a theatre in Farnham, either in the form of a restored Redgrave Theatre or a new building.

==== The Maltings ====
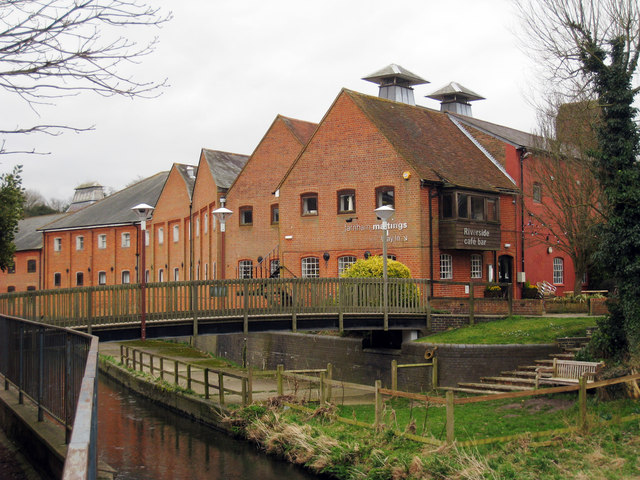
The Maltings creative arts centre on the River Wey and Bridge Square, Farnham

Productions still regularly take place at the Maltings, which produces work and receives touring shows. Productions are occasionally held in the grounds of Farnham Library. Various genres of music are promoted at the Maltings, where there is a dance studio. The Maltings is a creative arts centre, catering for all ages, with workshops, clubs, groups and sessions involved in craft, theatre, music and writing, including Rock Choir, amongst others.

==== The New Ashgate Gallery ====
The New Ashgate Gallery is a non-profit, educational charity based in Farnham. It specialises in contemporary art and craft, organising a programme of exhibitions and projects with artists and makers. Established in 1959, the gallery is the longest running craft space in South of England and was the first provincial gallery to showcase both local and international artists. Architect Paul Archer designed a quarter-million pound redevelopment for the Gallery that was finished in 2004. The gallery organises established platforms to present new work through exhibitions projects such as the Surrey Artist of the Year competition, organised with the Surrey Open Studios, the Hothouse, an early career maker support programme with the Crafts Council, and the annual, open call Rising Stars touring exhibition that provides information, guidance, networking and exhibition opportunities to emerging and graduating artists from the UK and internationally.

==== Peter Pan ====
It was in Farnham, whilst living at Black Lake Cottage, a remote woodland retreat near Tilford, that J. M. Barrie was inspired to write Peter Pan.

Bourne Wood

The nearby Bourne Wood is a popular film location appearing in Gladiator, Thor: The Dark World and Wonder Woman.

== Education ==
Farnham has a broad mix of state schools and private schools, including faith schools. There are eight infants' schools, nine primary/junior schools, three secondary schools and two schools for pupils with special educational needs. There are also four independent schools in the Farnham area.

Farnham College (part of Guildford College) provides further education. The University for the Creative Arts at Canterbury, Epsom, Farnham, Maidstone and Rochester (UCA; a merger of the local Surrey Institute of Art & Design, University College and Kent Institute of Art & Design) provides higher education.

The area includes some of the top state schools (academies) in the country including South Farnham School, Weydon School and others which consistently rank highly in school results year on year including South Farnham, which has more than once been rated the best state primary school in the country based on exam results.

Farnham Grammar School started some time before 1585 (when a donation by a Richard Searle was recorded "to the maintenance of the school in Farnham"). In 1905 the town centre assets of the old grammar school, located in West Street, were sold in order to purchase and build new premises in fields to the south of the town. In 1973 this campus became a Sixth Form College and was renamed Farnham College.

== Sport ==
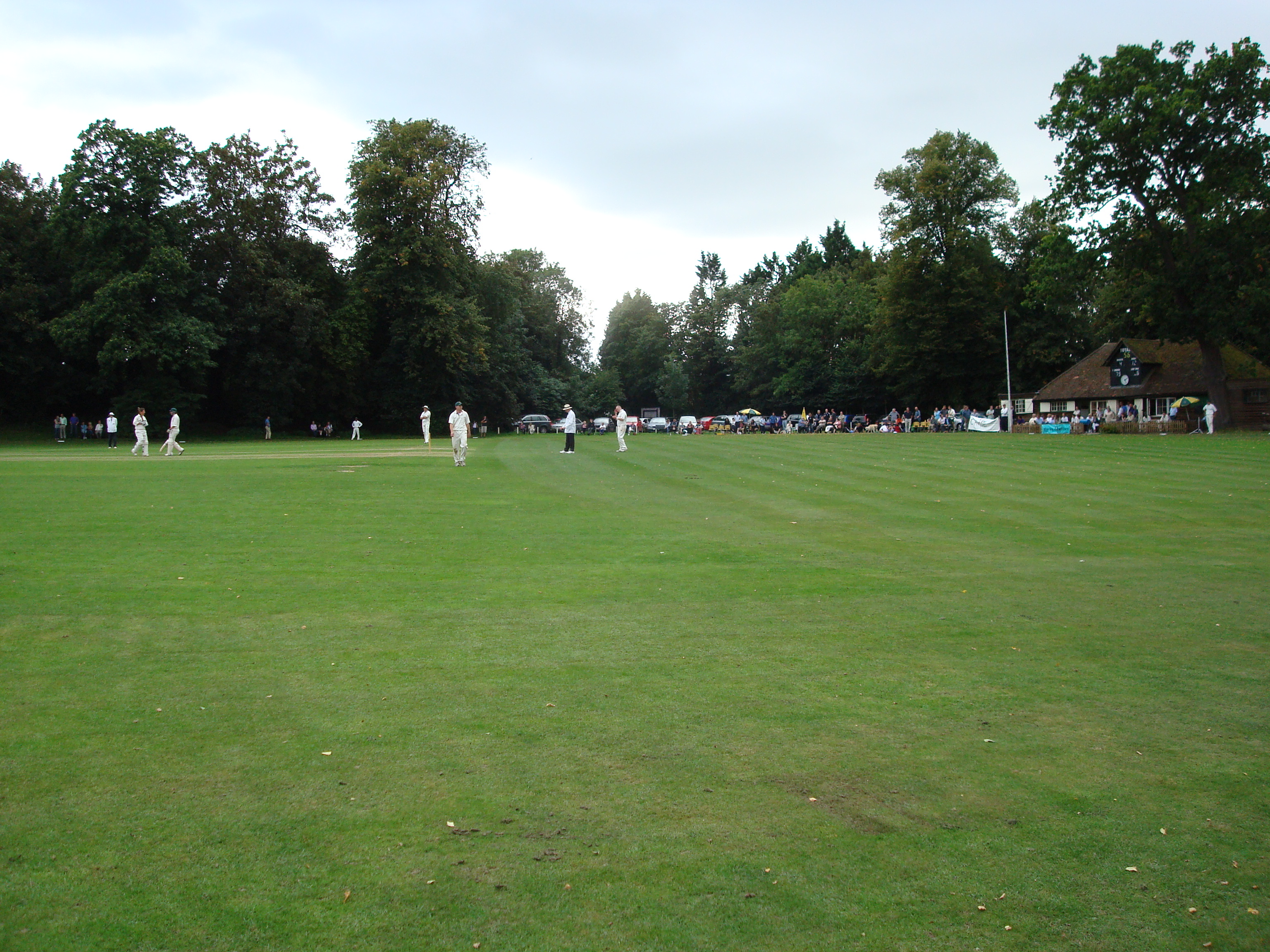
Cricket is played in the ground north of Farnham Castle

There are various sporting facilities in Farnham of which the local leisure centre is one. The centre is run by DC Leisure on behalf of Waverley borough council. The leisure centre was built in 1981 with a swimming pool and training pool, gym and main hall for team sports. The entire centre was refurbished in 2010, during which the swimming pool was lengthened by four centimetres to exactly 25 metres to allow galas to be held.

The town is represented in the non-league football pyramid by Farnham Town F.C., who will compete in the National League South in the 2026–27 season. They play their home games at the 2,200 capacity Memorial Ground.

Farnham Swimming Club (FSC) was established in 1893 and is based at the Farnham leisure centre. The club is a member of Swim England and competes in the National, Regional and County Championships.

Farnham Cricket Club was established in 1782, originally playing in Holt Pound. The current ground is at the edge of Farnham Park near the former moat of the castle.

Farnham RUFC is based in Wilkinson Way. Farnham Archers have a ground in Elstead.

The Farnham and Aldershot hockey club runs six senior men's teams, four senior women's teams who play in the South, Hampshire and Surrey leagues. Floorball hockey is regularly played by the adult team Southern Vipers FBC.

Farnham has a public golf course next to the cricket ground directly behind Farnham Castle. It was designed by Sir Henry Cotton. It is a nine-hole, par-three golf course.

Formula 2 and Formula 3 team Rodin Motorsport (formerly Carlin Motorsport) are based in the town. Carlin won the 2018 F2 Teams' Championship with current McLaren Formula 1 driver Lando Norris and former Formula E driver Sérgio Sette Câmara.

== Demography and housing ==
In 1901, the population of Farnham was about 14,000. Since the end of the Second World War, Farnham has expanded from a population of about 20,000 to 39,488; about 16,500 people live in the town centre (as distinct from the town centre conservation area), while the remaining inhabitants live in the suburbs and villages within the town's administrative boundaries.

2011 census homes
Output area	Detached	Semi-detached	Terraced	Flats and apartments	Caravans/temporary/mobile homes	Shared between households
(Civil parish)	6,689	4,299	2,568	2,467	20	7

The average level of accommodation in the region composed of detached houses was 28%, the average that was apartments was 22.6%.

2011 census key statistics
Output area	Population	Households	% owned outright	% owned with a loan	Hectares
(Civil parish)	39,488	16,050	37.0%	37.6%	3,652

The proportion of households in the civil parish who owned their home outright compares to the regional average of 35.1%. The proportion who owned their home with a loan compares to the regional average of 32.5%. The remaining % is made up of rented dwellings (plus a negligible % of households living rent-free).

== Governance ==
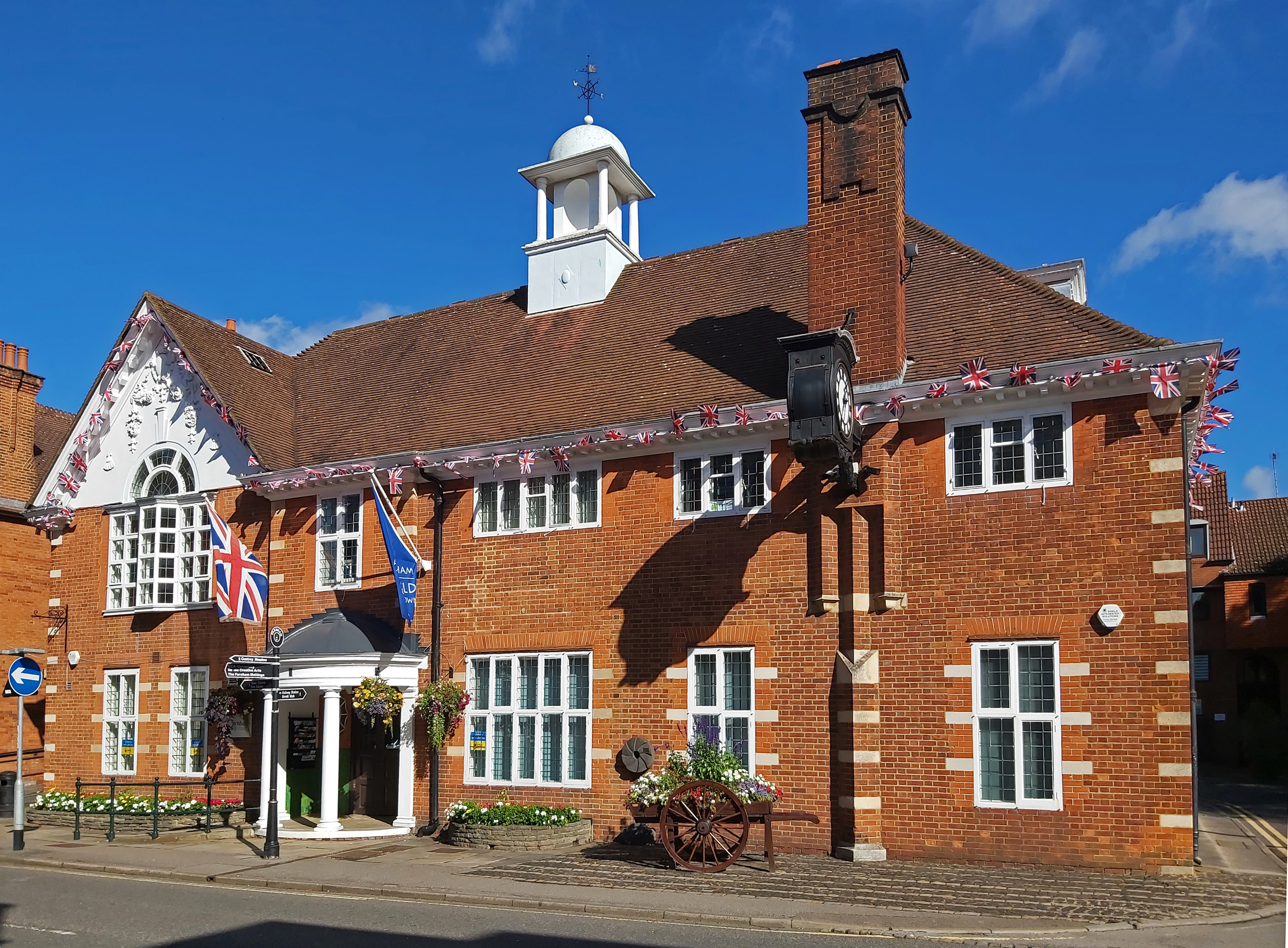
Farnham Town Hall in South Street

Farnham is represented by councillors at a county, district and town level. Farnham is represented at Surrey County Council by three councillors from three county council wards: Farnham Central, Farnham North and Farnham South. As of the 2021 election, all three of the sitting county councillors are members of the Farnham Residents party.

As the town with the largest population in Waverley, Farnham has nine wards, and is represented by eighteen councillors at Waverley Borough Council. As of the 2019 election, 15 councillors represent the Farnham Residents party, two represent the Liberal Democrats, and one represents the Conservatives.

== Media ==
The Farnham Herald is the only newspaper exclusively for Farnham; established by E.W. Langham in 1892 and bought by the Tindle Newspaper Group in 1967. Farnham is also covered by Ash & Farnham News & Mail, which is published by Trinity Mirror.

== Parks and open spaces ==
=== Gostrey Meadow ===
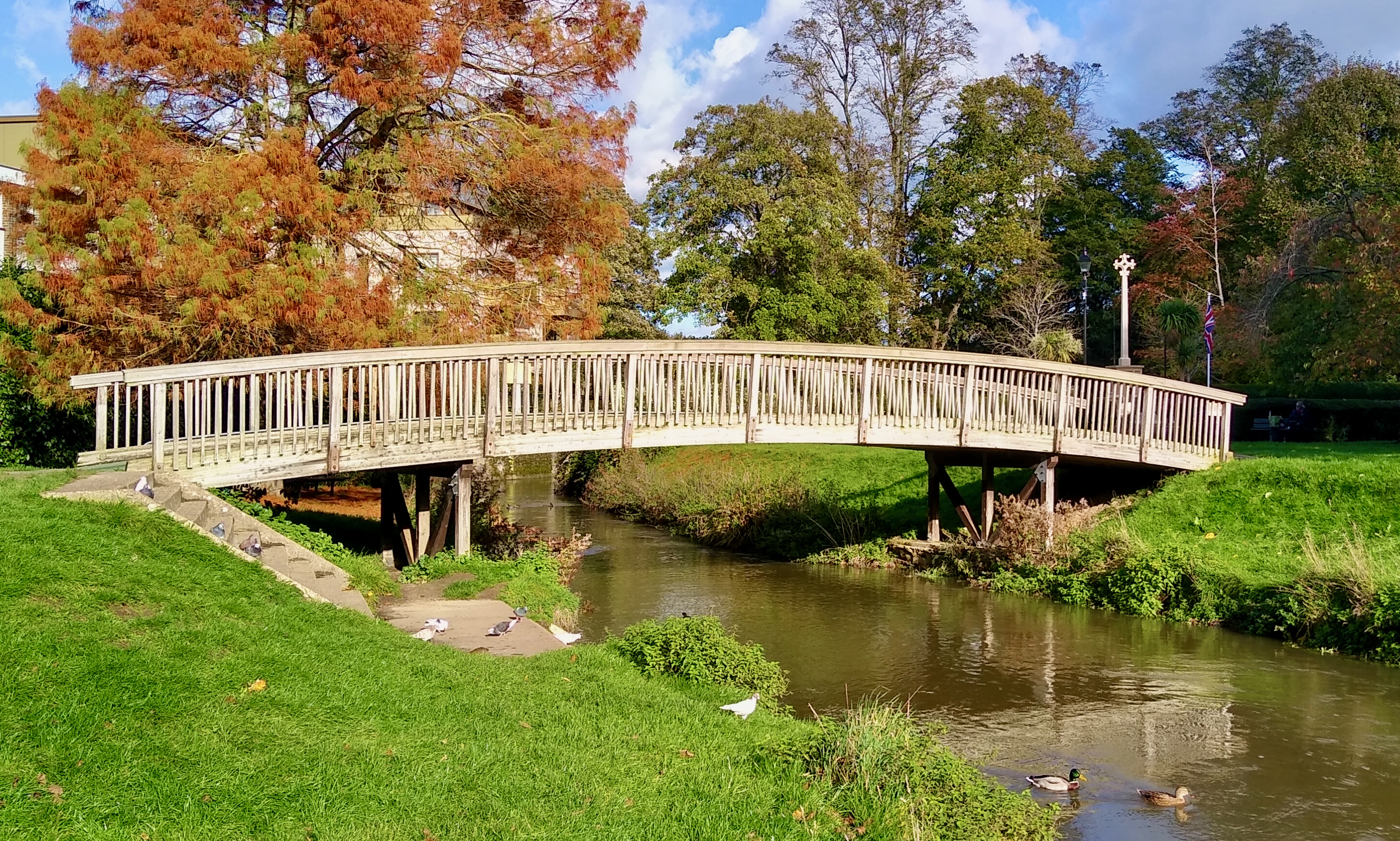
Footbridge over the River Wey, Gostrey Meadow

Until the late 17th century, Gostrey Meadow was part of a larger area of land owned by the Bush Hotel. The estate became progressively fragmented as building plots were sold and by 1900, the meadow was being used as an illegal rubbish dump. The 4-acre (1.6 ha) site was purchased by the UDC in 1909 and repurposed as a public park. The area was landscaped and the ground flattened. The drinking fountain was installed in 1911 and, the following year, the public shelter and wooden bridge over the Wey were opened. The war memorial at the east end of the meadow was designed by the architect, W. C. Watson, in Portland stone and was dedicated in April 1921.

=== Farnham Park ===
The area now known as Farnham Park was created for Bishop William of Wykeham in 1376 and was initially known as the New or Little Park. Like the larger Old or Great Park to the west, it was used as a deer park for Farnham Castle. By 1690, the Great Park was being used as farmland, but the Little Park was used for intended purpose until the late 18th century. Under Bishop Brownlow North in the early 19th century, the park was landscaped with the addition of walkways and planting of new trees. 295 acres (119 ha) were offered for sale to the borough in 1928 and the purchase was completed in July the following year.

=== Tice's Meadow, Badshot Lea ===
The 55 ha (140-acre) Tice's Meadow at Badshot Lea was previously a former quarry, operated by Hanson plc. Sand and gravel extraction ended in 2010 and the site was redeveloped as a community nature reserve. A formal opening ceremony took place in May 2018, following the installation of two new footbridges over the River Blackwater. Tice's Meadow was purchased by Surrey County Council in 2021, supported by funding from five other local councils. The reserve features areas of open water, exposed gravel islands, seedbeds and woodlands. It provides a habitat for bird species, including reed warblers and sand martins, and has been designated a Site of Nature Conservation Interest. In November 2022, the Tice's Meadow Bird Group was given a National Biodiversity Network award for its work in surveying and recording bird species at the site.

== Notable people ==
John Henry Knight with his car

In addition to those mentioned in the text above, notable people born in Farnham include:

- William Willett, campaigner for daylight saving time (1856)
- George Sturt, writer and social historian (1863)
- Maud Gonne, feminist and activist in Irish politics (1866)
- John West, prominent missionary to Canada(1778–1845) was born in Farnham
- John Abraham Nuske, composer and guitarist, (1796–1865) was a "Printed Books and Music Seller" on West Street for at least 20 years during the mid-19th century
- Richard Tice (1964), Multi-millionaire businessman and deputy leader of Reform UK, serving as an MP in Boston and Skegness.

Notable Farnham residents include:

- Sir George Barlow, 1st Baronet, Acting Governor-General of India from the death of Lord Cornwallis in 1805 until the arrival of Lord Minto in 1807.
- John Verney (author), decorated war hero, artist and architectural conservationist lived at Runwick House from 1944 to 1976, two miles (three kilometres) outside Farnham.
- Anthony Faramus, actor, author, hunt saboteur and concentration camp survivor lived in the town.
- John Henry Knight (1847–1917), who built the first British motor car and designed a number of innovative digging machines for use in hop fields, was born and brought up at Weybourne on the outskirts of the town.
- Reveverend John Macleod Campbell Crum, writer of the hymn Now the Green Blade Riseth, was Rector of Farnham from 1913 to 1928, and his daughter Margaret was born in the town in 1921.
- Actor Jim Sturgess was raised in Farnham (1981-).
- The British intelligence officer Christopher Steele, known for compiling the controversial Steele dossier, lives in Farnham with his family.
- Edgar Mittelholzer, Guyanese-born author, lived in Farnham after moving to England.

=== Actors and actresses ===
- Gerald Flood, stage, TV and film actor, lived in Farnham for most of his life.
- Peter Lupino, a well-known West End actor of the 1930s and 40s, and member of the famous theatrical family, also lived for many years in Farnham, in Red Lion Lane and was a well-known local character in his retirement.
- Actor Bill Maynard of Carry On and Heartbeat, was born in the town.
- The actor Bill Wallis lived in the town and learned his trade on the stage of the Castle Theatre.
- Opera singer Sir Peter Pears (1910–1986) was born in Farnham.
- Jessie Matthews (1907–1981), the actress, dancer, and singer of the 1930s to 1960s, lived in Weybourne.

=== Notable sportspeople ===
- Cricketer "Silver Billy" Beldham (1766–1862) was born on the outskirts of town, in Wrecclesham. He played in Farnham Cricket Club's first match, against Odiham, when he was 16 years old
- Graham Thorpe (1969–2024) England cricket captain, was born in Farnham and played at the Farnham cricket ground
- Mike Hawthorn (1929–1959), driving for Ferrari, became the first British Formula One World Champion in 1958. His family moved to Farnham when he was two years old, so his father could be nearer to Brooklands race track
- Jonny Wilkinson (1979-) England's world-cup-winning kicker and former captain was born in Frimley and grew up in Farnham. Jonny, alongside England scrum half Peter Richards (1978-) who was not born in Farnham, played for Farnham Rugby Football Club at mini level
- Joel Freeland (born 1987), international basketball player and NBA player for the Portland Trail Blazers, worked in Farnham as a shelf-stacker for a supermarket
- Tom Pollitt (1900–1979), first-class cricketer and Royal Air Force officer
- Gilbert White (1912–1977), first-class cricketer and British Army officer
- Fran Wilson (born 1991), England Women's Cricket Player was born in Farnham
- Lottie Woad (born 2004) amateur golfer

== See also ==
- List of places of worship in Waverley (borough)

== Bibliography ==
- Ewbank Smith, William (1979). Edwardian Farnham: The story of a Surrey town, 1900-1914. Alton: Charles Hammick. ISBN 0-9068-5600-0.
- Ewbank Smith, William (1983). Farnham in war and peace. Chichester: Phillimore. ISBN 0-8503-3522-1.
- Gover, J.E.B.; Mawer, A.; Stenton, F.M. (1969). The place-names of Surrey. Cambridge: Cambridge University Press.
- Mills, A.D. (2003). Oxford Dictionary of British Place Names. Oxford: Oxford University Press. ISBN 978-0-19-852758-9.
