= Farnham Town Hall =

Municipal building in Farnham, Surrey, England

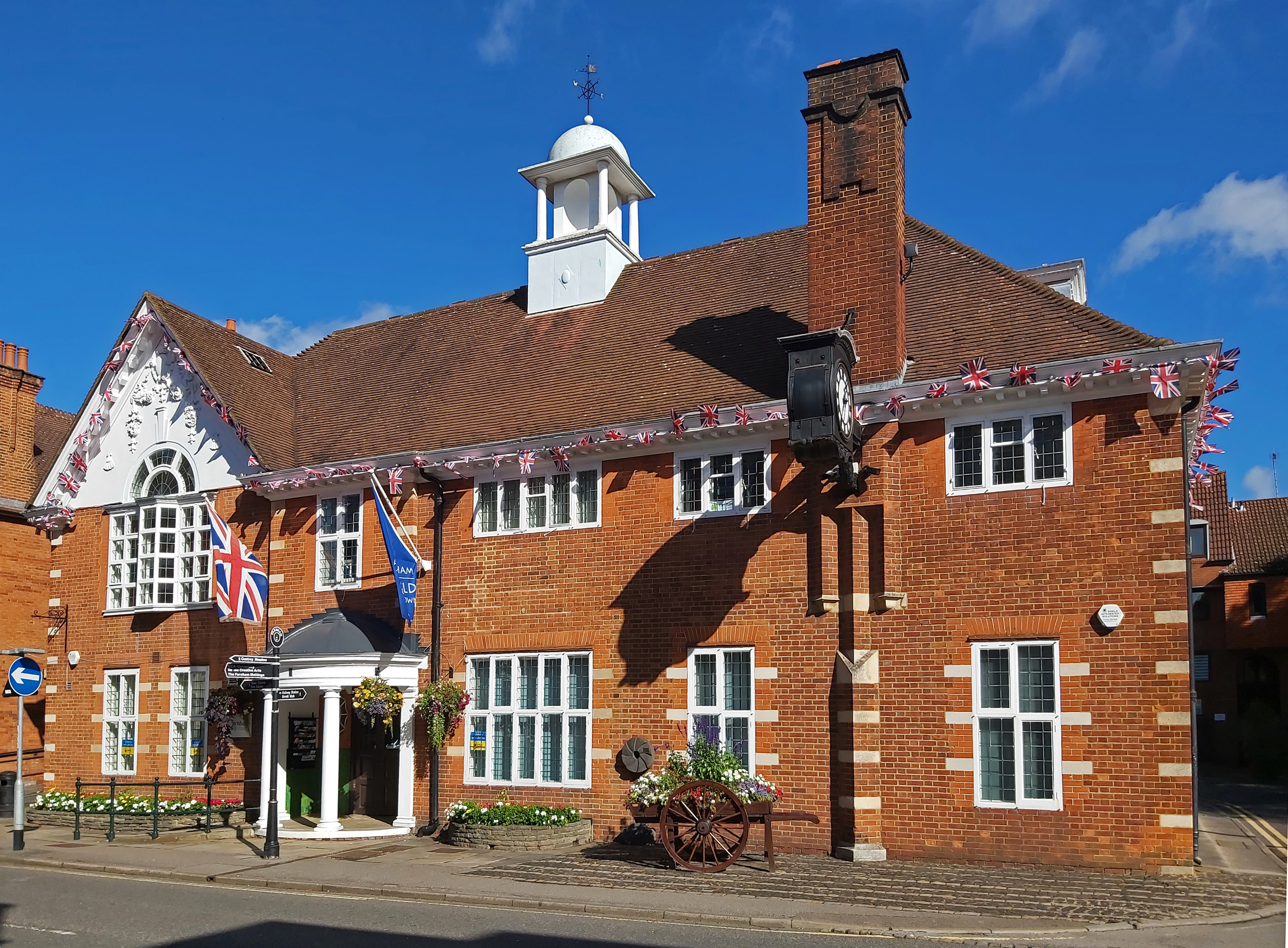
- Farnham Town Hall

- Shown in Surrey
- 51.2140°N 0.7953°W
- Location: South Street, Farnham

History
- Built: 1903

Site notes
- Architect: Paxton Hood Watson
- Architectural style: Neo-Georgian style

Farnham Town Hall is a municipal building in South Street, Farnham, Surrey, England. It provides the offices and the meeting place of Farnham Town Council.

== History ==
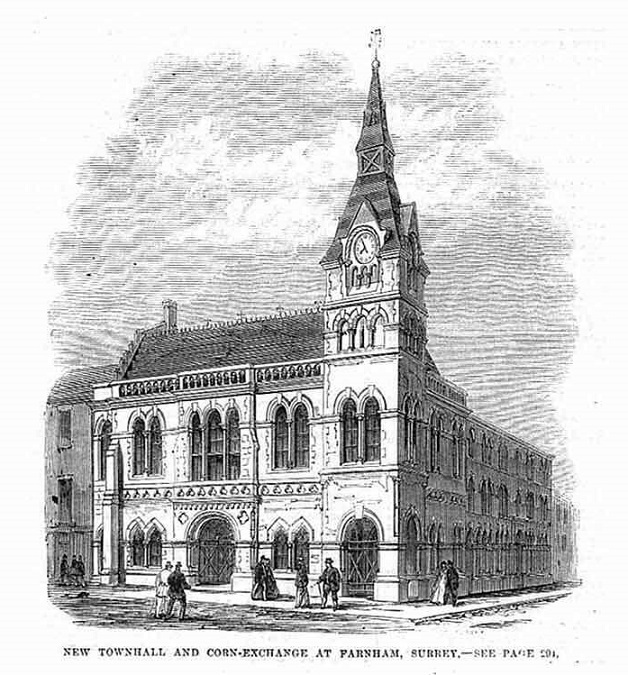
The Town Hall and Corn Exchange of 1866

The first municipal building in the town was the Bailiff's Hall in The Borough which was built in red brick and completed in 1674. In the middle of the 19th century the local board of health decided to commission a new town hall and corn exchange: the site they chose was just to the south of the Bailiff's Hall on the corner with Castle Street and was occupied by a public house known as the Goat's Head. The new building was designed by Edward Wyndham Tarn in the Gothic style, was built with white bricks from Huntingdon and was officially opened on 15 March 1866. The entrance was in the centre bay on the Castle Street side: there were shops on the ground floor on the side facing The Borough and the building featured an 88 feet (27 m) high clock tower with a belfry and a spire at the corner of the two streets. Internally, there was a market hall on the ground floor and an assembly room above; the interior of the building was decorated with terracotta supplied by John Blashfield. (Note: The old town hall and corn exchange was demolished in the late 1920s and replaced on that site by the Town Hall Buildings, which were designed by Harold Falkner in the Neo-Georgian style and completed in 1930: part of the old Bailiff's Hall was incorporated into the new structure, which was destined for commercial rather than municipal use.) The borough council, which had not met for many years, was formally abolished under the Municipal Corporations Act 1883.

Following significant population growth, largely associated with Farnham's role as an early commuter town, the area became an urban district in 1895. In this context civic leaders decided to procure new civic offices: the site they selected was open land on the northeast side of South Street. The new building was designed by Paxton Hood Watson in the Neo-Georgian style, built in red brick with stone dressings and was completed in 1903. The design involved an asymmetrical main frontage with five bays facing onto South Street; the first bay from the left featured a Venetian window with a white stucco gable above containing carvings in the tympanum; the second bay, which slightly projected forward, featured a semi-circular porch with Doric order columns and a domed roof and there was a casement window on the first floor. The right hand bay originally contained an archway for use by the horse-drawn fire engine and the other bays featured casement windows on both floors. A projecting clock was installed on the front of the building at first floor level on the right hand side and there was a modillioned cornice and a roof lantern at roof level. Internally, the principal room was the council chamber on the first floor.

The building continued to serve as the headquarters of Farnham Urban District Council for much of the 20th century but ceased to be the local seat of government after the enlarged Waverley Borough Council was formed in 1974. It was extended to the rear in the 1990s. Farnham Town Council acquired the building in 2011 and began using it as its offices as well as its meeting place. A suite of meeting rooms were subsequently refurbished and re-opened as The Tindle Suite in May 2015 in honour of Sir Ray Tindle, a newspaper proprietor and local benefactor. Works of art in the town hall include a portrait of the journalist and member of parliament, William Cobbett, on loan from the Farnham Museum.
