= Pullingers =

British art supply shop

Pullingers Art Shop
- Formerly: Pullingers Stationers
- Company type: Privately held company
- Industry: Retail
- Founded: 1850; 176 years ago in Farnham, Surrey
- Founder: Pullinger family
- Headquarters: Farnham, United Kingdom
- Number of locations: 4
- Area served: South west London
- Products: Art supplies and stationery
- Owner: Watson family
- Website: www.pullingers.com

Pullingers Art Shop (aka Pullingers) is British a chain of art shops with four retail outlets in Farnham, Kingston upon Thames and Epsom, Surrey, United Kingdom and online.

Pullingers are owned and operated by the John Watson & Co partnership, trading as Pullingers Stationers and Pullingers Art Shop.

== History ==
Established in 1850, Pullingers started with a store in Farnham, Surrey operating as Pullingers Stationers and is now thought to be Farnham's oldest surviving business.

The last of the Pullinger family to own the business sold it to The Farnham Castle Newspaper Group in 1979 upon his retirement. The business was then sold to the Watson family in 1993 and has remained under their ownership to the present day.

In 2000 Pullingers opened a new store in Fife Road, Kingston upon Thames. In 2004 they opened in Epsom's High Street and in 2008 they expanded online.

== Notes ==
- "Exploring pastel with Barry Watkin" (List of Suppliers)
- "Surrey Archaeological Collections: Relating to the History and Antiquities of the County" By Surrey Archaeological Society
