= Pullinger Kop Park =

Public park in Johannesburg, South Africa

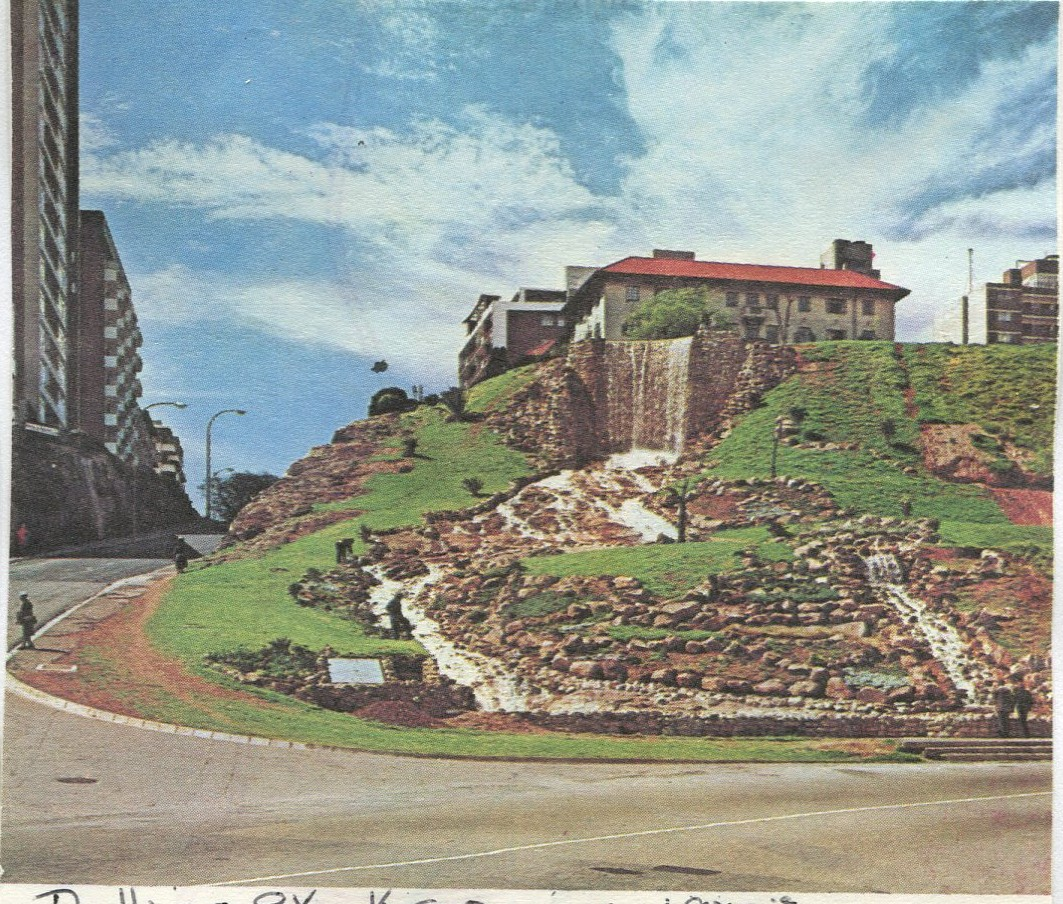
- Pullinger Kop Park in Berea

Pullinger Kop Park is a public park in the Berea District of Johannesburg, South Africa which is named for Edward Pullinger, a mining magnate who built his home at the top of the hill (kop) in 1890.

The park is situated on Primrose Terrace, just a block west of the Ponte City Apartments Building.

== History ==
The Park was opened in 1956 when a plaque to commemorate Olive Schreiner was unveiled. Olive E.A. Shreiner was a well known South African novelist, political pamphleteer, feminist and public figure.

== Design ==
Featuring a basketball court and children's play area as well as open green spaces interspersed with trees, the park is for recreation and leisure use within an otherwise densely populated urban area.

The Waterfall Embankment Artwork in Pullinger Kop Park was a community public arts project led by artist Andrew Lindsay initially in 1990 and then reworked in 2008. Andrew Lindsay runs the Spaza Art Gallery in Troyeville and has been involved in a number of public arts projects in South Africa. The Waterfall was initially depicted in mirror and blue tiles, to visually recreate the man-made waterfall that used to flow down the small cliff. In the second version, the waterfall was created in mosaic tiles and featured various insects and creatures.

As an extension to the Waterfall Embankment, in 2009, Andrew Lindsay and Spaza Art re-worked the pedestrian bridge originally built by the Parks Department over Nugget Street in 1986. The Windybrow Bridge links the Pullinger Kop Park and the Ekhaya Park and is a pedestrian gateway into Hillbrow via Nugget Street.

== Recent history ==
Unfortunately, in recent years Pullinger Kop Park has fallen into a state of neglect and there are anti-social issues blighting the park which have reduced its use as an outdoor community amenity space.

== Heritage Status ==
The Pullinger Kop Park is historically and culturally significant for the following reasons:

- The Pullinger Kop Park is associated with Edward Pullinger, a mining magnate from the formative period of Johannesburg
- The park contains a memorial plaque to Oliver Schreiner, a celebrated South African author and public figure
- Pullinger Kop Park is a community recreation area and therefore has social significance
- Pullinger Kop Park was created in 1956 and so will soon qualify as a heritage site on the grounds it will have been in existence for sixty years or more
