= Nathaniel Lloyd (architectural historian) =

British printer, businessman and architectural historian

Nathaniel Lloyd OBE FSA (5 March 1867 – 8 December 1933) was a British printer and businessman who, later in life, studied architecture as a pupil of Sir Edwin Lutyens and became an architectural historian and author. He owned the Grade I listed house Great Dixter in East Sussex, now a legacy left to the nation by his youngest child, Christopher Lloyd, the gardener and author.

== Career ==
Born in Oswaldtwistle, Lancashire to John and Rachel Lloyd, a comfortably well off middle class family, Nathaniel Lloyd started his career with the Mazawattee Tea Co and was responsible for its advertising and printing at the height of its expansion. In 1893, Lloyd left the tea company and founded his own business, Nathaniel Lloyd & Co, Lithographic Printers. This successful colour printing firm was responsible for numerous advertising posters, for example, a poster for ‘Lazenby’s “Chef” Sauce and other delicacies’ held in the collections of the Victoria and Albert Museum and posters printed to aid the war effort held by the Science Museum, London. It was so successful that Lloyd was able to take partial early retirement in 1909, becoming joint managing director of the Star Bleaching Co, which he sold in 1912 and turned to his second career in architecture.

Lloyd studied architectural drawing and set up a small practice. He was appointed a Fellow of the Royal Institute of British Architects in 1931 and was also a Fellow of the Society of Antiquaries of London and a member of the London Survey Committee. Lloyd was a keen photographer who took many of the photographs for his books and his collection, of over 3600 prints and negatives, mostly taken between 1910 and 1930, was acquired by Historic England in 1997. Photographs by Nathaniel Lloyd are also held by the National Trust and in the Conway Library, whose archive of mainly architectural images is being digitised under the wider Courtauld Connects project.

== Great Dixter ==
When he retired from his business in 1909, Nathaniel Lloyd began looking for an old house to buy and renovate. In 1910 he purchased the 15th century manor house Dixter for the sum of £6,000 and also bought a 16th century timbered yeoman’s house in Benenden Kent, subject to a demolition order, for £75, dismantling it and moving it to Dixter. He commissioned Edwin Lutyens and together they renovated the houses, built on to them and designed the 5 acre garden. At that time it was renamed Great Dixter.

Lloyd was always conscious that the work should be conducted sympathetically and true to its period and, after the restoration was completed in 1912, he wrote in a memorandum of 1913; "The spirit in which the work has been done may be summed up by saying that nothing has been done without authority, nothing has been done from imagination; there has been no forgery". 1913 was also the year in which Great Dixter first appeared in the magazine Country Life in an illustrated article.

Both Nathaniel and his wife, Daisy took an interest in the extensive gardens at Great Dixter, employing nine gardeners, and that interest was continued by their youngest son Christopher Lloyd. After taking a degree in horticulture at Wye College in Kent and becoming an associate lecturer at the college for four years, Christopher returned to Great Dixter in 1954 and set up a plant nursery. From 1963 onwards he wrote the weekly column ‘In My Garden’ which appeared in Country Life for over 40 years. Christopher continued to live in Great Dixter and regularly opened the house and gardens to the public. Prior to his death he set up The Great Dixter Charitable Trust to run the estate and continue to open the house and garden to visitors.

== Private life ==
In 1905 Nathaniel Lloyd married Daisy Field and they had six children, 5 sons, Selwyn (1909–35), Oliver (1911–85), Patrick (1913–56), Quentin (1916–95), Christopher (1921-2006) and 1 daughter, Letitia (1919–74). After Nathaniel’s death in 1933, Daisy Lloyd took over the running of the estate, assisted by Christopher, until her death in 1972, aged 91.

== Publications ==
- A History of English Brickwork : with examples and notes of the architectural use and manipulation of brick from Mediaeval times to the end of the Georgian period, Antique Collectors Club, 1983 (first published London : H.G. Montgomery, 1925), ISBN 9780907462361
- Garden Craftsmanship in Yew and Box with a preface by Christopher Lloyd, Woodbridge : Garden Art Press, 1999 (first published London : Ernest Benn, 1925), ISBN 9781870673143
- Building Craftsmanship in Brick and Tile and in Stone Slates, Cambridge : Cambridge University Press, 2014 (first published 1929), ISBN 9781107673366
- A History of the English House from primitive times to the Victorian period, London : Architectural Press; New York : William Helburn, 1931, reprinted 1975 ISBN 9780803801073
