= Farnham Maltings =

Arts centre and former brewery in Farnham, Surrey, England

Coordinates: 51.212°N 0.797°W

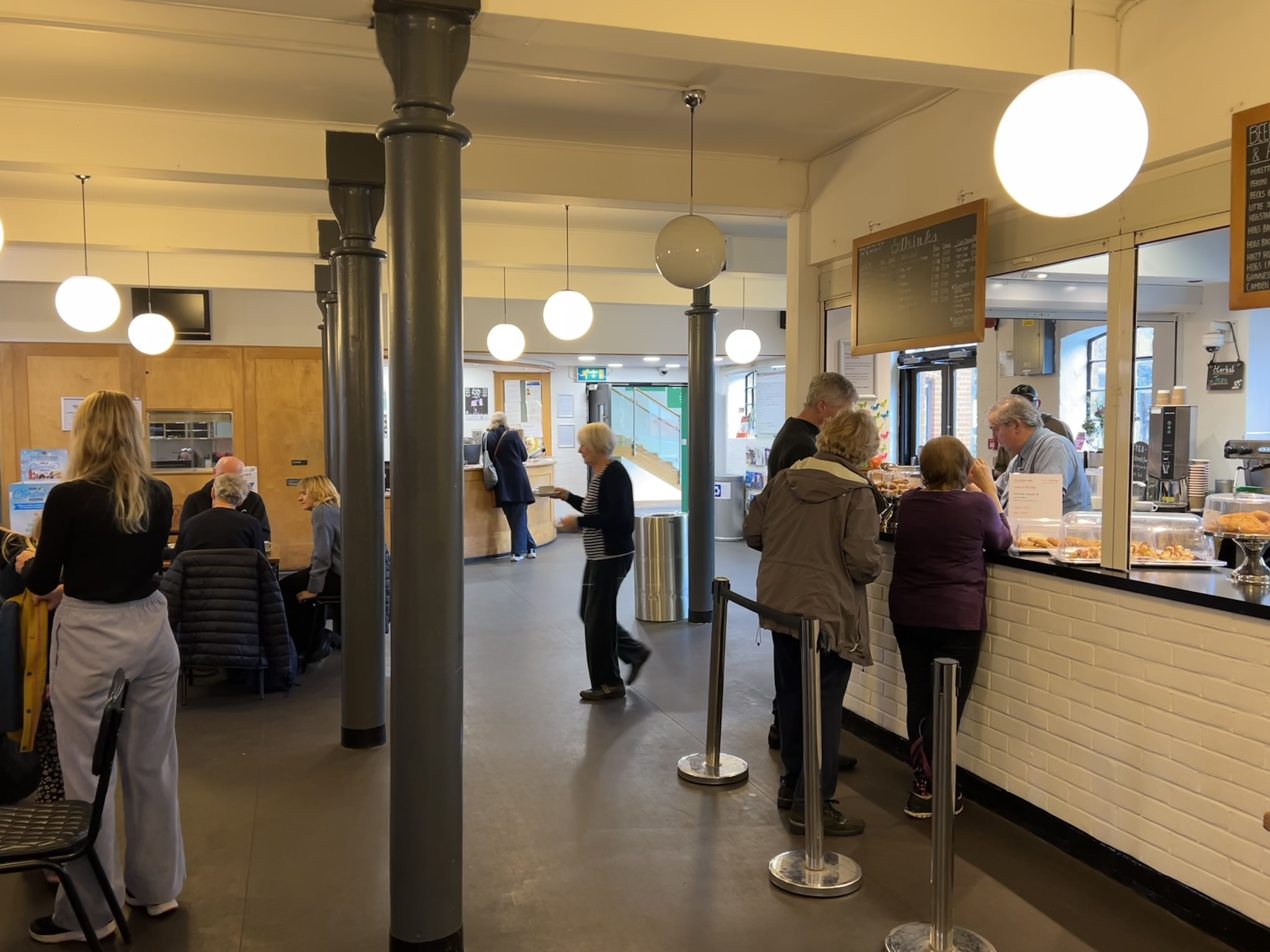
Farnham Maltings foyer and cafe area

Farnham Maltings is a creative arts centre in the heart of the market town of Farnham in Surrey, England, that dates back to 1750s when it was used as a tannery.

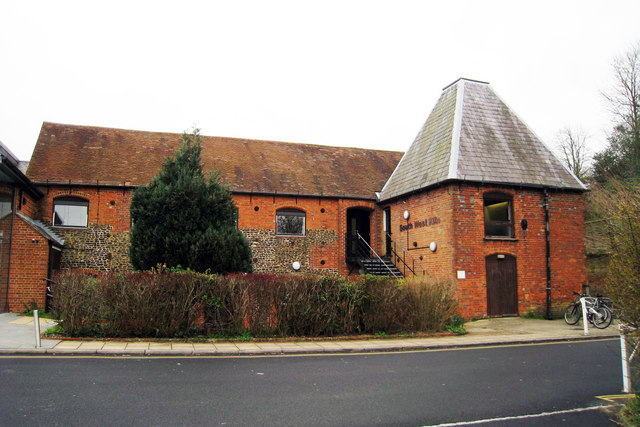
Farnham Maltings, central elevation

== History ==
Farnham Maltings was bought by the community, currently led by its town council in 1969.

It was once a historic brewery that was then taken over by the people of Farnham raising £18,000 towards the £30,000 required by Courages Brewery, the owners of the Maltings. The Maltings originally was two separate buildings. One side being used in the 1750s as a tanyard by Micheal Reading. In 1845 the buildings were sold for £1,400 and were converted into a brewery. However the East Wing was a separate building at this point, and was bought by Robert Sampson in 1830 who set it up as a maltster. Eventually being bought by John Barrett in 1881.

In 1890, George Trimmer bought the whole property as well as bringing together all of his and Barretts 91 pubs plus 8 off-licences. This business was known as the Farnham United Breweries. This brewery swiftly became a malting complex, producing his own beer using the malted barely. This was a major income in the late 1890s for Farnham.

Trimmer died in 1892, passing the Maltings on to his family who developed the riverside buildings whilst also innovating the latest malting equipment.

Eventually after lots of hard work and expensive deals, The Maltings was saved by the community and developed into an arts and community centre for the town to enjoy.

== Location ==
The Maltings is in the centre of Farnham Craft Town in Surrey. The building's higher points overlook the River Wey situated next to The Maltings cafe, that proceeds to run through the rest of Farnham.

Farnham Station is a 5 minute walk away, making the accessibility of The Maltings very easy for anyone travelling further. And as a result, increasing the footfall into the events which take place there, positively impacting the economy of the Farnham community.

== Facilities ==
The Maltings’ buildings comprise a range of large rehearsal spaces, the Great Hall, 15 artists studios, pottery, café and cellar bar.

The rehearsal spaces can be booked through The Maltings venue coordinator via the website. The building also contains a café and a cellar bar that opens during performances.

The Maltings offers art programmes, craft fairs and festivals for the public. These events are super popular and bring the community together in Farnham, and take place regularly.

== Uses ==
The Maltings' stated ambition is to encourage the most people to make the best art that they can.

The Maltings hosts a regular programme of performance that includes folk, roots and acoustic music, blues and jazz music, cinema and stand up comedy for all ages, as well as musical theatre and children's theatre. In addition it hosts a number of festivals, including festival of crafts, unravel, sugarcraft, quilting and gardening and an annual Christmas Fair. The Maltings also works with a number of regional theatre companies managing it as an international showcase and producing new work for new audiences.
