= Michael Blower =

British architect

Michael Blower MBE FRIBA FRSA
- Born: May 25, 1929 (age 97); Brussels, Belgium
- Citizenship: United Kingdom
- Education: Douai Abbey, The Architectural Association
- Occupation: Architect
- Years active: 1958-1995
- Spouse: Bernadette Blower (née Muûls)
- Children: 6 incl Patrick Blower
- Practice: West Surrey, UK

Michael Blower MBE AAdipl FRIBA FRSA (born 25 May 1929) is a British architect, activist for the preservation and restoration of England's cultural heritage and accomplished watercolourist and recorder of England's townscapes. Most of his buildings, drawings, paintings and the subjects of his activism are in West Surrey.

== Biography ==
=== Family and early life ===
The Blower family are recorded in Shrewsbury, Shropshire over several centuries from around the early 1500s, largely members of the property owning merchant classes who held local power through the city's independent institutions in contrast to the gentry, who held political power from their landholdings in the countryside and exercised the highest political offices of the county and nation, such as sheriff and knight of the shire (MP). Sons (and now daughters) of the Blower family have been hereditary freemen of the city since before the time of the Reform Act 1832 and Michael's great-grandfather and grandfather John had built up a successful business in the middle to late 1800's as cabinetmakers and house furnishers there, later run by John's younger brother Benjamin after John's untimely and early death. John was an alderman of the City of Shrewbsury and Benjamin was a sometime mayor and their former business premises, J&B Blower, now house the City Museum, and the name 'Blowers Repository' remains emblazoned across the stone facade. John had nine children – Michael's father Frank in the middle – with his wife Catherine Bromley, kin of the Corbets, families that were amongst the most powerful landed gentry of the county from the time of the Norman Conquest through to the 19th century political emancipation that so transformed the nation. Frank was a horseman and fought in the Great War as a Captain of the Royal Horse Artillery, seeing action on the Western Front, in North Africa and the Middle East. After the War, he remained in Belgium and settled in Brussels, where he was part of a vanguard rebuilding horse racing in the country and where he met his wife, Kathleen 'Kitty' (Tree) Waring. Michael was born the middle of three children in Brussels and raised in the neighbourhood of Ixelles, with French as his first language. In 1939 and as a British citizen by birth, Michael fled Belgium with his family before the advance of the German Army and left on the last civilian boat to leave the country as war began. He attended a number of schools as the family settled into English life during the chaos of war but spent a happy six years at Douai Abbey School, moving onto the Portsmouth College of Art to study architecture.

=== Early career ===
After Portsmouth, Michael moved to London and the Architectural Association (AA) on Scholarship between 1950 and 1953, where his contemporaries included Roderick Gradidge and John Winter. Along with great friend Winter he was selected as one of the UK's delegates to CIAM IX Conference in Provence, led by the dual husband and wife teams of architects Jane & Maxwell Fry and Alison & Peter Smithson with whom they travelled down from Paris to the conference in Aix-en-Provence by car. The conference was attended by such luminaries as Walter Gropius, Fernand Léger, Josep Lluís Sert and Le Corbusier, who gave the delegates a private tour of the soon to be completed Unité d'habitation in Marseille. After the AA and as a fluent French speaker, he was selected to act as project architect for the British Pavilions at Brussels World Expo 1958, working with designers Felix Samuely, Howard Lobb, Edward Mills, Sir Hugh Casson and James Gardner. Blower spent a short period in the late 1950s working at an architectural practice in Minneapolis (US), by the name of Willard Thorsen. In the early 1960s he was an associate at Guildford architects, Scott Brownrigg & Turner, where he assisted the completion of the Yvonne Arnaud Theatre in Guildford among other projects. In 1964 he joined Leonard Stedman as a partner at AJ & LR Stedman, which later took the name of Stedman & Blower.

=== Stedman & Blower Architects ===
The practice had been founded by Farnham's most eminent architect of the time, Arthur Stedman in 1895. After his death in 1958, the practice was continued by Leonard Stedman, his son. Michael took over the practice in its entirety in 1968 on the latter's retirement. He was awarded First Prize by the RICS/The Times for the preservation of The Tanyard, Farnham's oldest house in 1982 and an RIBA Award for The New House with Roderick Gradidge in 1998. The practice is now known as Stedman Blower Architects and is one of the world's oldest architectural practices continuously operating.

=== Roderick Gradidge ===
Blower completed a number of fine restorations and extensions to country houses in Surrey in the 1980s and 1990s. He did these in a loose partnership with the prominent Chiswick-based architect, Roderick Gradidge. Their first projects were on Voysey's New House in Haslemere and on Detmar Blow's Charles Hill Court for an Austrian industrialist. From there, they went on to Harold Falkner's Tancreds Ford, which they designed and built for the writer Ken Follett and his first wife, and which was published in two articles in Country Life. Next came The New House, reputedly designed by Hugh Thackeray Turner and for which they jointly won a RIBA Award, which was also published in Country Life. Just prior to Roderick's death, they were working on a project at Combe Court, which was completed by his sons Damien & Robert, through their architectural practice, Stedman Blower.

=== Activism and public service ===
Blower was mayor of Waverley Borough Council in 1995 and served as a borough councillor and Surrey County Councillor for over 20 years, representing the ward of Farnham. He was for long involved in the recording, preservation and valuing of West Surrey's architectural heritage through his involvement over 40 years with the Farnham (Buildings preservation) Trust Ltd and the Farnham Society, for which he served variously as president and chairman. He was influential in arguing for the preservation of the Farnham Pottery, the last working bottle kiln in England, the Brightwells Gardens and the Redgrave Theatre in the town centre. He also ran a weekly column called Environmental Viewpoint in the Farnham Herald Newspaper between 1986 and 1991, with Susan Farrow. The articles, over two hundred and sixty in number, explored the architectural and cultural heritage of the area around Farnham. The column received a national publishers' award. In the New Years Honours 2020, he received an MBE for services to Farnham and the local community. In August 2022, he was added to the 'Farnham Wall of Famous People' by order of the Farnham Town Council.

=== Personal life ===
After his studies at university, Blower did two years' National Service in Singapore and was commissioned in the Royal Engineers. After an interval working in Brussels and in Minneapolis, Minnesota, he returned to the UK with his young family in late 1959 and settled in West Surrey. His great-grandfather was the American Jurist, philanthropist and US Ambassador to Belgium and Russia at the turn of the 20th century, Judge Lambert Tree. His mother's half-brother was the Conservative MP Ronald Tree, his first cousins the horse trainer Jeremy Tree, painter Michael Lambert Tree and 1960's supermodel Penelope Tree. He married Bernadette Muûls (1933–2019), also Brussels-born, niece of the prominent Belgian diplomat and sometime Belgian Ambassador to (West) Germany and the UN in Geneva, Baron Fernand Muûls, in 1958. He was elected Fellow RIBA in 1969 and Fellow RSA in 1987. Blower has filled over 200 sketchbooks with thousands of drawings of the people and places of West Surrey. Some of these have been published.

Blower was parent to four boys, two daughters, and had 11 grandchildren. The eldest child, Patrick Blower (b 1959), MA is the noted British cartoonist and illustrator, formerly Evening Standard diary cartoonist (having taken over from Raymond Jackson 'JAK') and Sunday Times feature cartoonist. He is currently the chief political cartoonist at The Telegraph and has been a contributor to the BBC, Guardian Online and Private Eye.

== Gallery ==
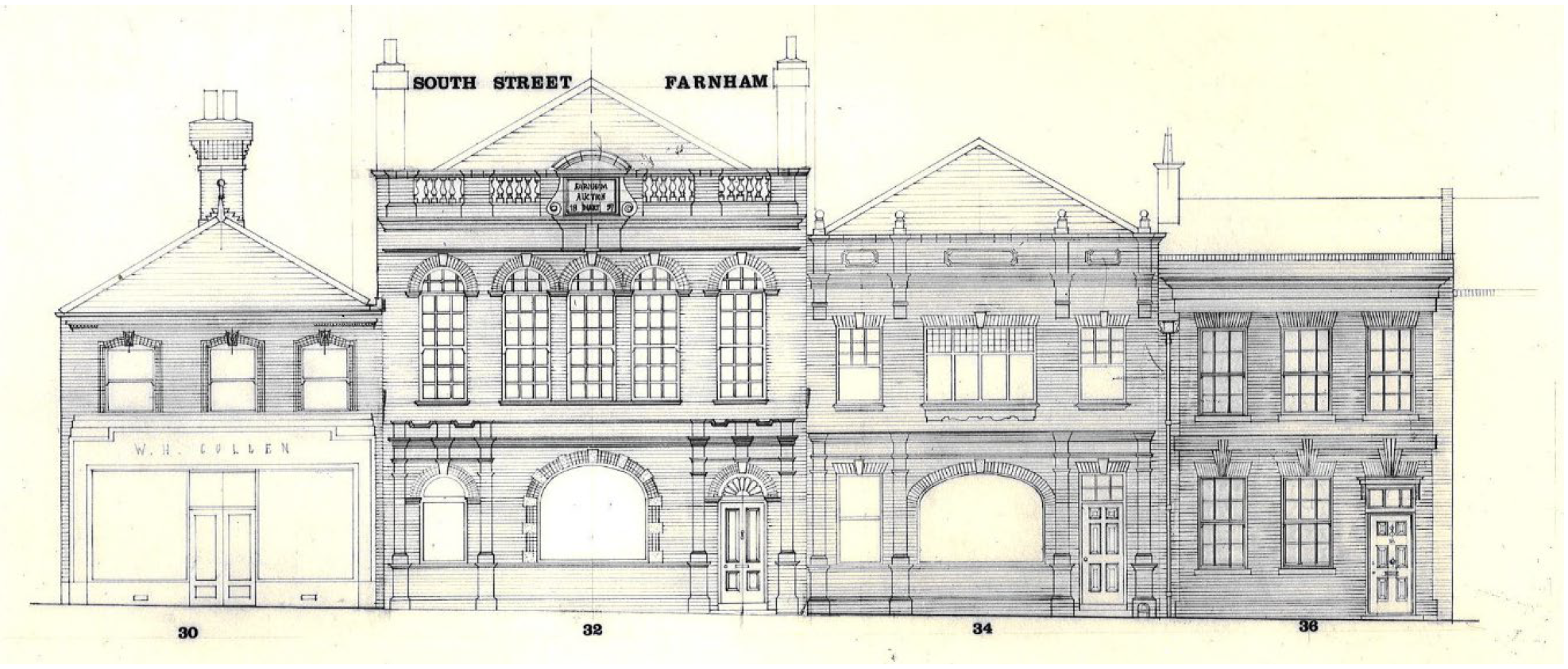
Elevational line drawing of 30-36 South Street, Farnham, Surrey prior to demolition in 1990, by Michael Blower

== Legacy ==
The major part of his archive and of his architectural drawings survive and are maintained by The Blower Foundation. Some of his archive can also be found in the Stedman Blower Architects archive, also held by the Blower Foundation.

== Bibliography ==
- West Surrey Architects, by Christopher Budgen. Woking: Heritage of Waverley, 2002 (paperback, ISBN 0-9542131-0-6).
- Harold Falkner: More Than an Arts & Crafts Architect, by Sam Osmond. Chichester: Phillimore, 2003 (paperback, ISBN 1-86077-253-6).
- The Surrey Style, by Roderick Gradidge. Kingston: Surrey Historic Buildings Trust, 1991 (paperback, ISBN 0-9517022-0-3).
- The Architecture of Expo 58 by Rika Devos & Mil De Kooning (eds). Dexia/Mercatorfonds, 2006 (ISBN).
- Walk Around Farnham by Michael Blower. Frith Book Company Ltd, 2005 (ISBN 1-84567-646-7).
- Farnham Portrait by Michael Blower & Susan Farrow. Ashgate Editions, 1989 (ISBN 0-85967-838-5).
- Farnham – Moments in View by Michael Blower & Susan Farrow. 1988 (ISBN 0-7045-3107-0).
- Aldershot Sketchbook by Michael Blower & Susan Farrow. Emerald Art, 1992.
- The Mayor's Sketchbook – Book 1 by Michael Blower. Waverley BC, 1995.
- The Mayor's Sketchbook – Book 2 by Michael Blower. Waverley BC, 1996 (ISBN 0-9524187-0-3).
- The Mayor's Sketchbook – Book 3 by Michael Blower. Waverley BC, 1996 (ISBN 0-9524187-1-1).
- Farnham, A report of the Listed Buildings Working Party by Michael Blower. Farnham UDC, 1971.
- An Illustrated History of Godalming by Geoff Covey & Michael Blower. Waverley BC, 1993.
