= Harold Falkner =

British architect (1875–1963)

Harold Falkner FRIBA
- Born: 28 November 1875; Farnham, Surrey, England
- Died: 30 November 1963 (aged 88)
- Citizenship: United Kingdom
- Occupation: Architect
- Practice: 24 West Street, Farnham

Harold Falkner FRIBA (28 November 1875 – 30 November 1963) was a notable British architect in the early 20th century and is now considered a leading exponent of the vernacular and the Arts & Crafts in architecture. Most of his surviving buildings are in West Surrey.

== Personal life ==
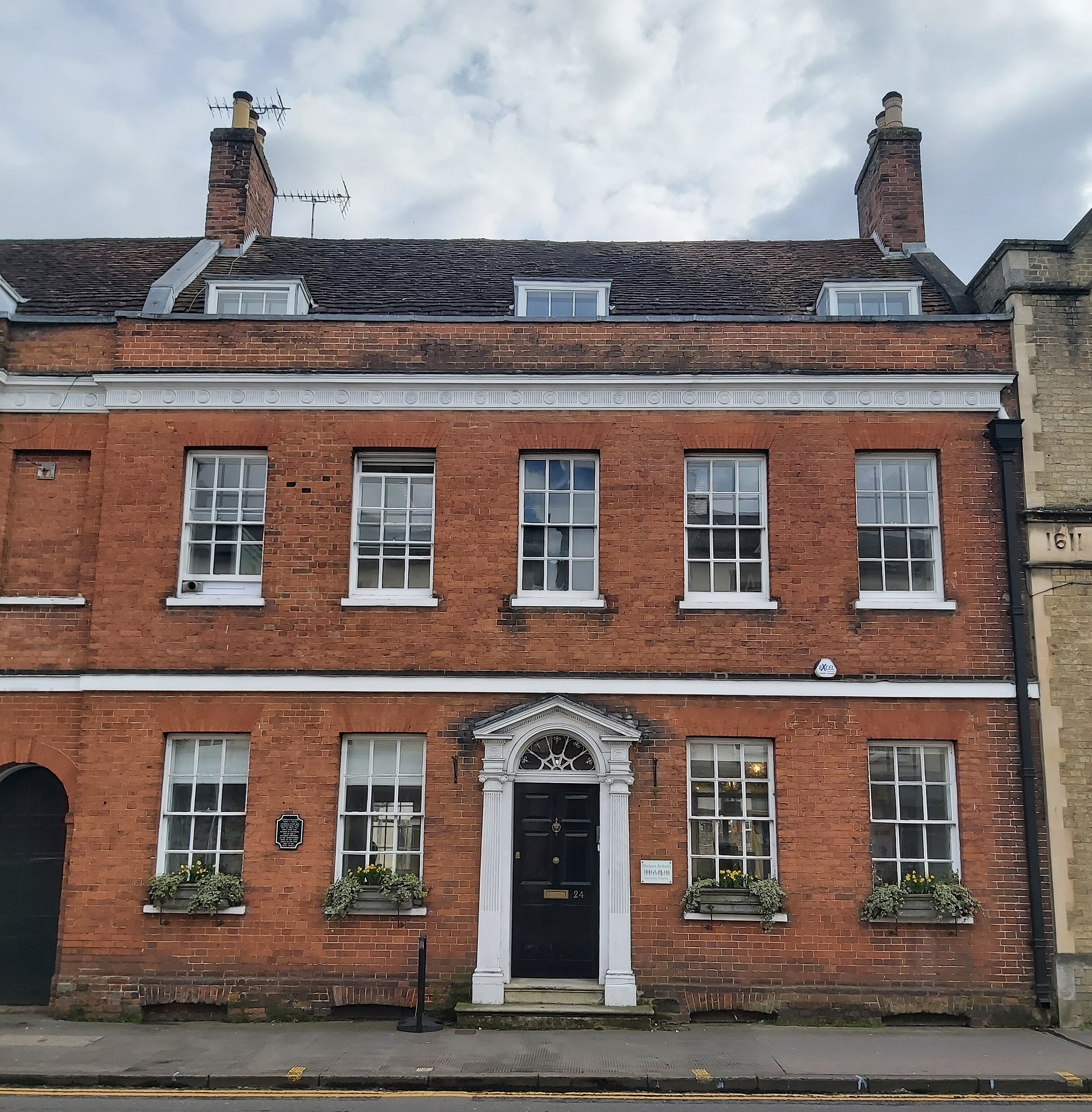
24 West Street, Farnham, where Falkner lived almost all his life and ran his practice from.

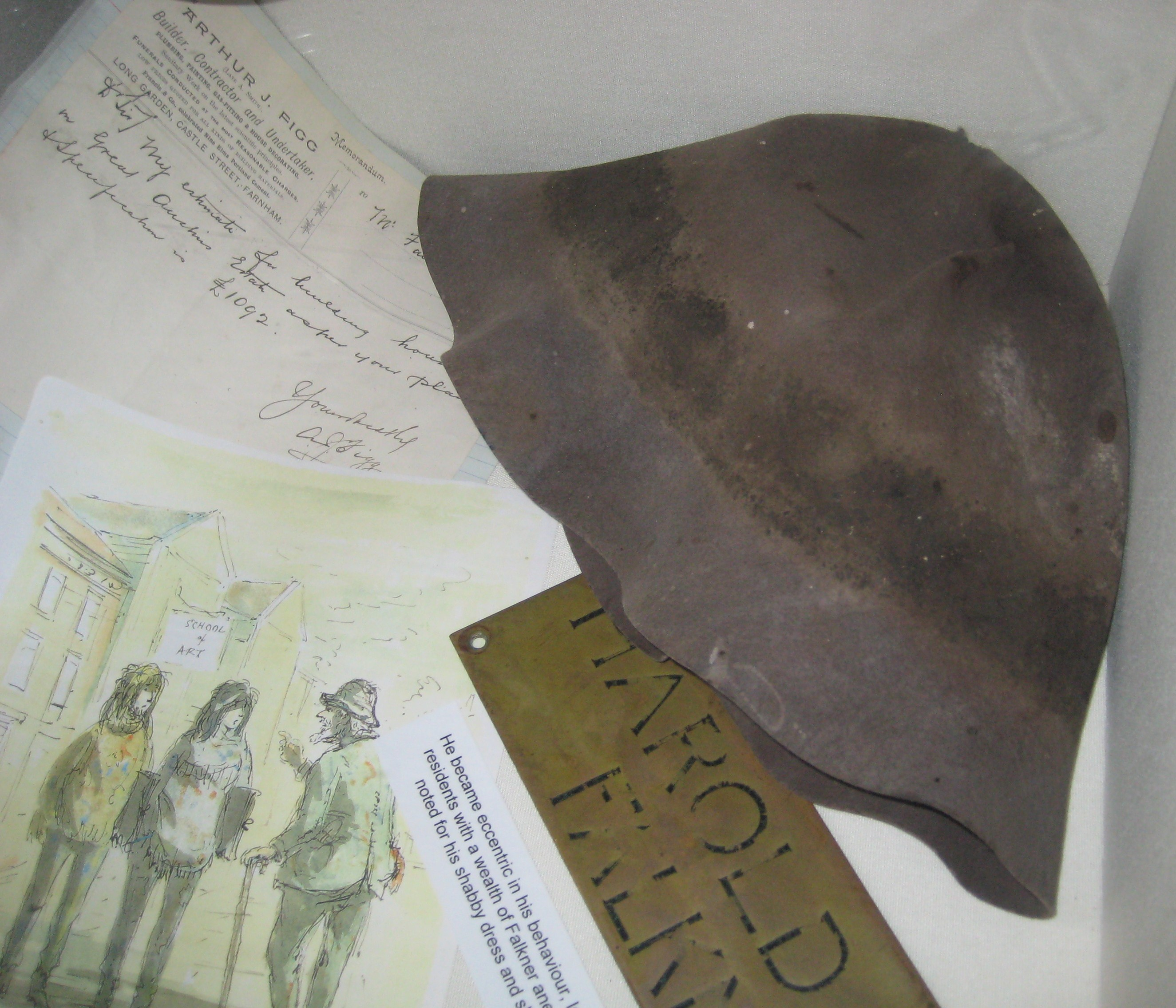
Falkner's notoriously shabby hat that he wore in his later years.

Falkner was born on 28 November 1875 at White House, Bramley, Surrey, England. Falkner was born into a wealthy land-owning family, just five months after his father's death. The family settled at 24 West Street, Farnham in 1883 and it was in this house that the young boy remained, running his architectural practice there until his death at the age of 88 on 30 November 1963.

Falkner was educated at Farnham Grammar School, and then at Farnham School of Art where he studied architecture under W. H. Allen. He undertook his articles training under Reginald Blomfield, where he became well versed in the neo-Georgian style.

Faulner died from pneumonia on 30 November 1963, aged 88, at 44 Hale Road, Farnham, Surrey. He was never married and had no surviving children. His estate, £114,030, passed to his sister's family.

== Career ==
=== Early career ===
Falkner attended Farnham Grammar School and was articled first with the influential architect Sir Reginald Blomfield and then with the Farnham practice of Niven & Wigglesworth who he joined in partnership in 1900 under the name of Niven, Wigglesworth & Falkner. This partnership was dissolved by 1909 and he worked mostly on his own for the remainder of his career, apart from three years in partnership with a younger Farnham-bred architect, Guy Maxwell Aylwin.

=== Later career ===
Based out of the modest market-town of Farnham, in Surrey, his buildings, around 115 of them, are all in that area. A lifelong friend of Gertrude Jekyll, he was a near-contemporary of Edwin Lutyens, many of whose buildings can be seen in the locality. He was frequently featured in the architectural press of the time and created buildings in a range of styles, from Arts and Crafts and Queen Anne to neo-Georgian and Tudor. His relative obscurity has been attributed to his refusal to adopt the Modern Movement and his rather obstinate character. His obituary in the Architectural Review was written by Sir Nikolaus Pevsner.

His buildings include Stranger's Corner (the former home of W. H. Allen), the Farnham Town Hall buildings and Bailiff's Hall (both Grade II listed), the Tudor-style "Spinning Wheel" building in the Borough. The (former) Jolly Farmer, Runfold is a fine brick and stone building and the cottages next to Manor Farm in Seale are an essay in the sort of workers' cottages being built all over the Surrey countryside in this period. Delarden in Moor Park is a rendered country house. Although less notable is his scheme for the Sampsons Almshouses (1933–34) on West Street, Farnham, which is not nearly as good as the Macdonalds Almshouses (1908) next door. These Almshouses were designed by Farnham's other prominent architect of the day, Arthur Stedman, who was probably his most significant rival.

=== Dippenhall ===
The Falkners had a large land ownership in the hamlet of Dippenhall just a mile or so to the West of Farnham. It was here that he realised some of his most interesting works as he built throughout his career a dozen or so important houses, using a variety of refurbishments, extensions and recycled old buildings as havens for the vernacular architecture of West Surrey.

Dippenhall Houses:

- Dippenhall Grange
- Overdeans Court
- Halfway House (Dora's Green).
- Deans Knowe
- The Barn
- Meads
- Burles
- Burles Lodge
- Grovers Farm
- The Old Barn

=== Farnham and Charles Borelli ===
Falkner is reputed to have been a key contributor to the preservation of Farnham as one of the best Georgian towns in England. Nicholas Pevsner disagreed with the derivation of the town as a Georgian gem and considered the town to be a reproduction of what the Victorians thought a Georgian town should look like. Nonetheless, with the local politician, Charles Borelli, his lifelong friend and collaborator, Falkner was responsible for several important works intended to preserve and enhance the town centre of Farnham at a time when few architects respected the need to maintain this cultural heritage. Farnham remains the town it is today, as a large part the result of their joint advocacy. Such buildings as 40, 41 and 42 The Borough, The Town Hall Buildings, 10 Castle Street, the Bush Hotel and the Bailiffs Hall exemplify his approach of careful addition, renewal and recycling.

=== Partnership with Guy Maxwell Aylwin ===
He also did much work in collaboration with the prominent Farnham architect, Guy Maxwell Aylwin with whom he was in partnership between 1927 and 1930 under the name of Falkner & Aylwin, including rebuilds of many local pubs for Courage's brewery, including the Seven Stars on East Street. Guy Maxwell Aylwin was from a family of local architects, father and son, much like his contemporary, Arthur Stedman and son, Leonard. Aylwin, like the younger Stedman was apprenticed at the offices of Sir Edwin Lutyens, who was raised just outside Farnham and built many of his earliest and most successful projects there. Falkner, Stedman and Aylwin are the three locally born Arts & Crafts architects who contributed most to the area's cultural heritage in this period.

=== Roderick Gradidge and Michael Blower ===
A number of his projects have been altered, restored and extended by the twin and eminent skills of architects, Michael Blower of Farnham and Roderick Gradidge of Chiswick, such as Overdeans Court, The Priory, Merlewood and Tancreds Ford (for the author Ken Follett). The latter was the subject of two fine articles in Country Life by Clive Aslet.

== Legacy ==
Part of his archive and some of his architectural drawings survive and are housed in the Farnham Museum. Some of his archive can also be found in Stedman Blower Architects archive, in the hands of the Blower Foundation. The houses of Dippenhall remain his most lasting legacy and within a few hectares stand a dozen or so buildings designed, built and altered by him throughout his career. Most are Grade II listed buildings and will remain along with his significant contribution to the town centre of Farnham, and the restoration and sensitive infill projects that he designed.

== Gallery ==
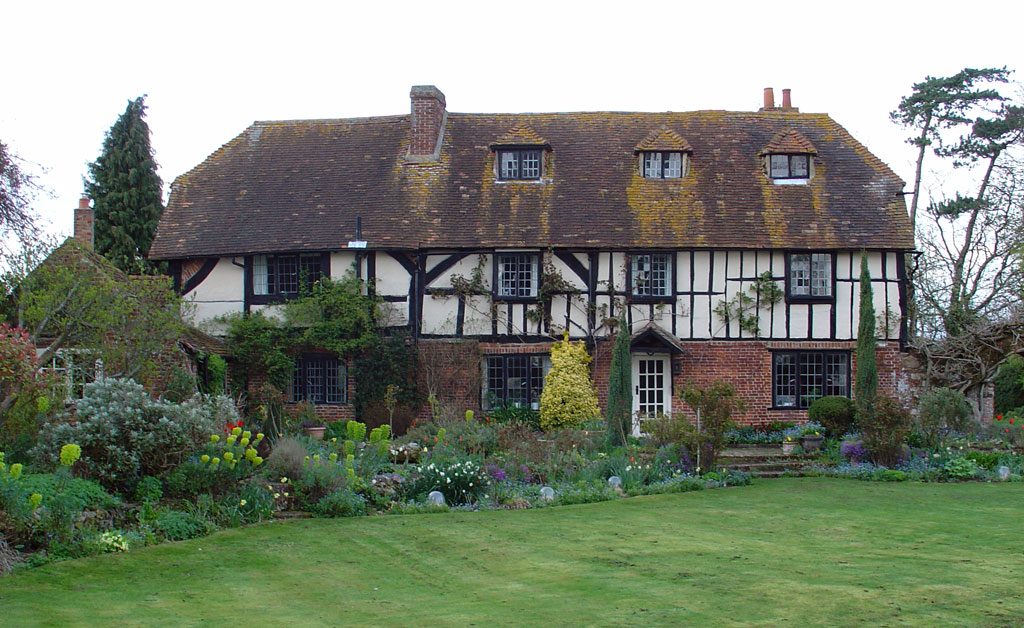
Deans Knowe, Dippenhall, Surrey

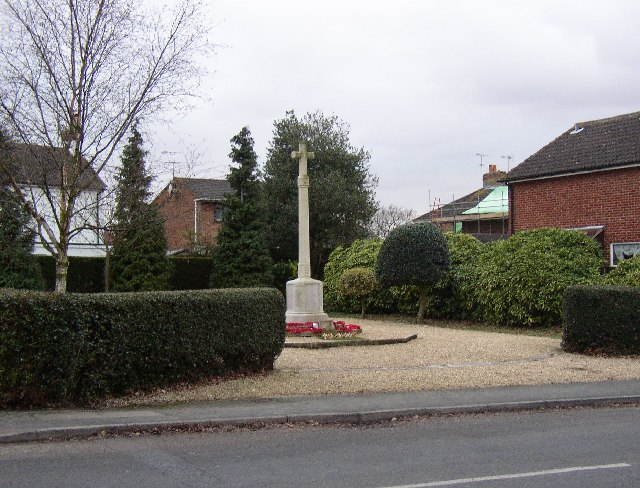
Ash War Memorial, Surrey

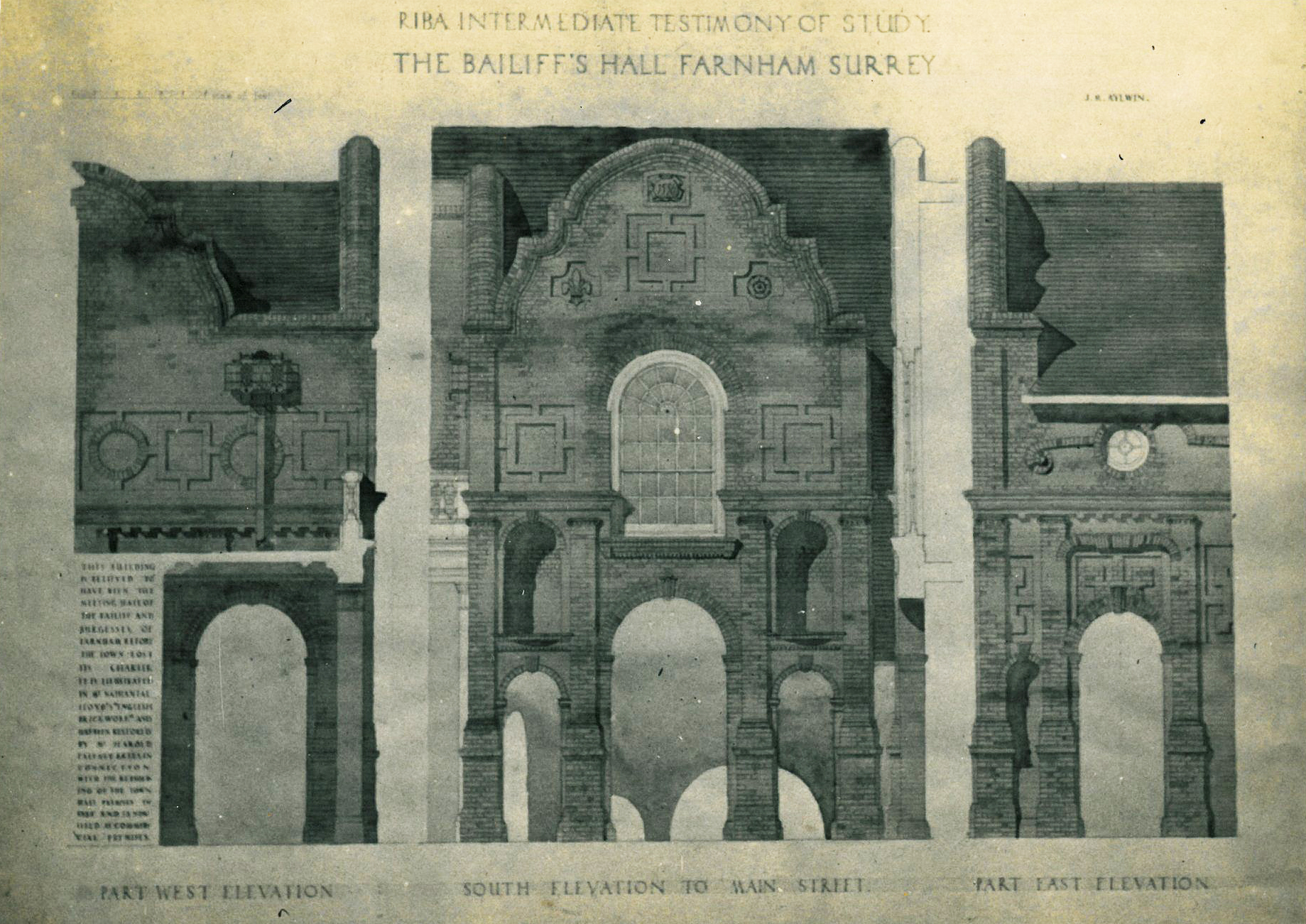
Drawing by Jill Maxwell Aylwin of her father Guy's restoration of the Bailiffs Hall undertaken with Harold Falkner in the mid-1930s

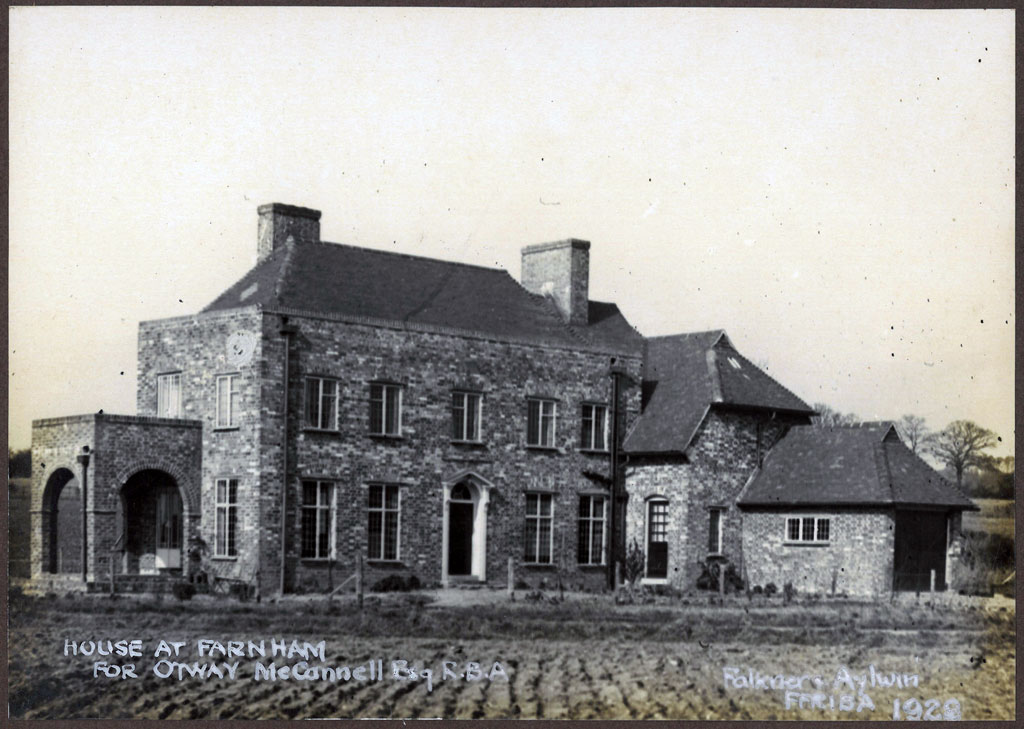
The McConnell House, Farnham, Surrey by Falkner & Aylwin, 1928

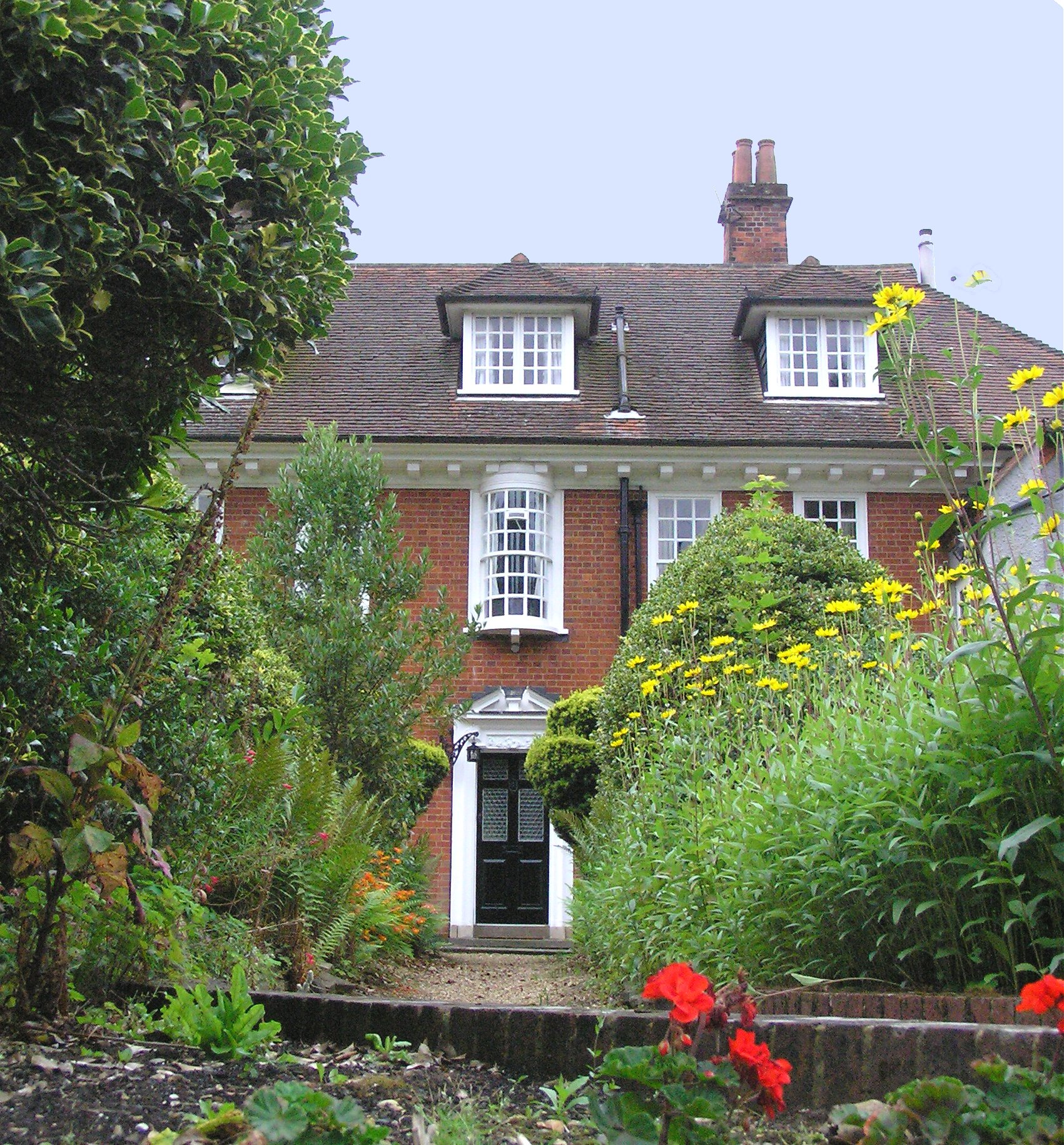
One of Falkner's designs – Stranger's Corner, Farnham

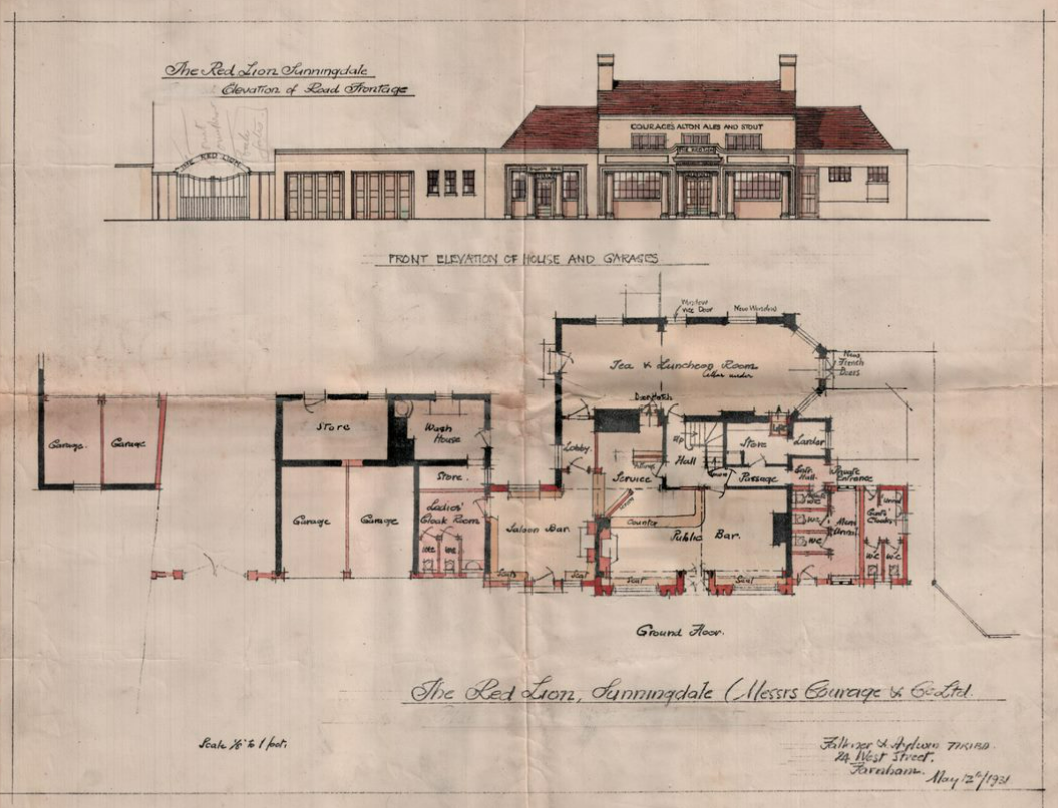
The Red Lion Pub, Sunningdale, Berkshire by Falkner & Aylwin for Courage Brewery (1931)

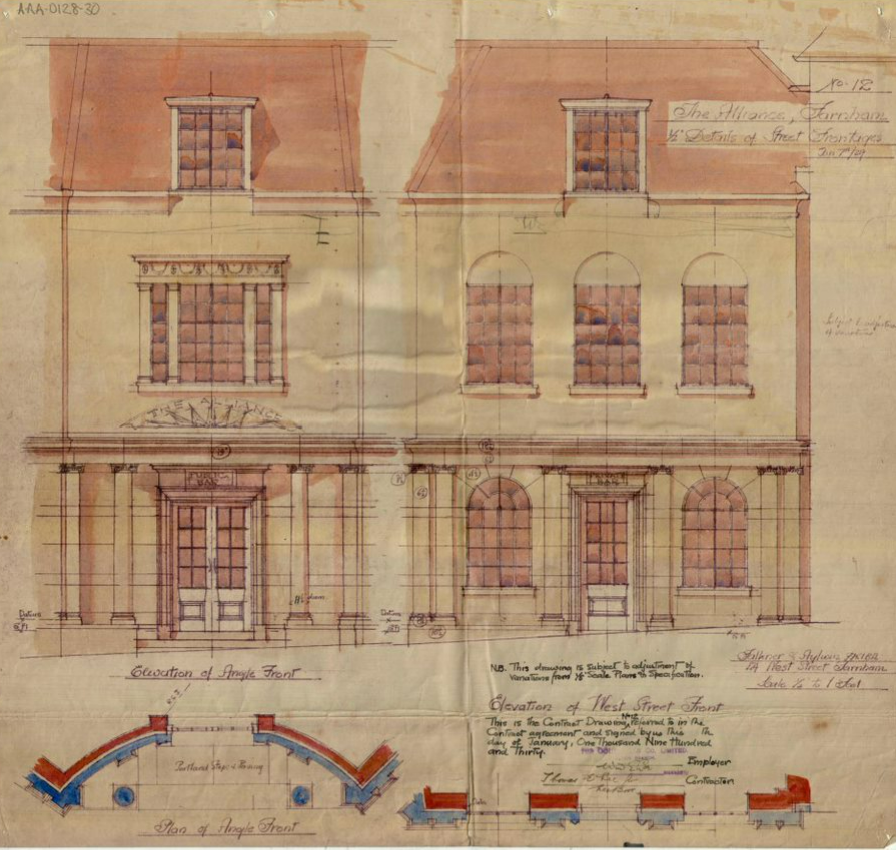
Former Alliance Pub, 12 Downing Street, Farnham by Falkner & Aylwin (1929)

== Bibliography ==
- West Surrey Architects, by Christopher Budgen. Woking: Heritage of Waverley, 2002 (paperback, ISBN 0-9542131-0-6).
- Harold Falkner: More Than an Arts & Crafts Architect, by Sam Osmond. Chichester: Phillimore, 2003 (paperback, ISBN 1-86077-253-6).
- The Surrey Style, by Roderick Gradidge. Kingston: Surrey Historic Buildings Trust, 1991 (paperback, ISBN 0-9517022-0-3).
- The Buildings of England: Surrey, by Ian Nairn & Nicholas Pevsner. London: Yale University Press, 2002 2nd ed (hardback, ISBN 0-300-09675-5).
- Dream Houses: The Edwardian Ideal, by Roderick Gradidge. Constable, 1980 (hardback, ISBN 0-09-461930-1).
