= Jordan Alexander Stein =

American academic

- Born: 1978 (age 47–48); New York, NY
- Education: B.A. University of California, Santa Cruz; Ph.D., Johns Hopkins University
- Occupation: Professor
- Years active: 2007–

Jordan Alexander Stein is an American literary critic and book historian. He is Professor of English and Comparative Literature and Affiliated Faculty in African and African American Studies at Fordham University.

Stein earned a B.A. at the University of California, Santa Cruz and a Ph.D. at Johns Hopkins University. In 2009-10 he was a National Endowment for the Humanities Postdoctoral Fellow at the Library Company of Philadelphia. He was elected to lifetime membership in the American Antiquarian Society in 2023, where he has twice taught for the Program in the History of the Book in American Culture (on African American Cultures of Print [2012] and Sex, Gender, and Print [2025]).

Stein's research investigates how aspects of social identities (including race, sexuality, gender, and religion) inflect the material practices associated with literary production (including reading, printing, editing, and archiving).

== Scholarship ==
=== "Bummer Theory of Print Culture" ===
Stein is a proponent of “the bummer theory of print culture,” defined as “the use of archival and empirical evidence to challenge the theoretical assumption that, as Cohen puts it, 'cultural work always works.'” The phrase was coined by Lara Langer Cohen as the “bummer school of American literature.”

The bummer theory of print culture argues against the conclusions of scholars including Benedict Anderson and Jürgen Habermas who see the advent and expansion of print technologies as fundamentally aggregative, promoting cohesive social collectivities (e.g. nations or public spheres). In their accounts, print's aggregation happens historically in sync with normal social rules for capitalist economic exchange, what Anderson calls "print-capitalism."

In contrast, the bummer theory of print culture maintains that the advent and expansion of print technologies is disaggregative, reflective of and possibly contributing to existing social divisions. Divisions include social movements or regional audiences who use print oppositionally in relation to national ideologies or public spheres. Print circulation can also depend on forms of exchange other than capitalist economics. For example, in When Novels Were Books, Stein emphasizes the role of late eighteenth-century Protestant philanthropic organizations in circulating texts within, and later apart from, the London printing economy. Other scholars who pursue related points include Cohen, Trish Loughran and Ben Kafka.

In the introduction to Early African American Print Culture, Cohen and Stein lay out three theses that presage the bummer theory print culture:

1. A challenge to the presumed to “the presumed universality of what we might call the print-capitalism thesis” (p. 13), showing instead that print tracks with political movements, racial ideologies, regional practices, and generic conventions, all of which can be buttressed by economics, but all of which often are not. Economic circulation is an aspect of social circulation in print culture, “rather than the other way around” (p. 13)
2. That texts circulate beyond their creators’ intentions, and so the identification of a text with a social category, for example “African American literature” should be broadened to encompass criteria beyond the identity of the author.
3. A recognition of the prevalence of copying and other forms of unoriginality, amount to “a rejection of the specious criteria that maintain that financially compensated original productions are the only meaningful mark of distinction in a print culture” (p. 15).

=== Studies of Elizabeth and Herman Melville ===
In 2019, Stein and Adam Fales (U Chicago) published an essay arguing that the 1892 reprinting of four of Herman Melville's novels was spearheaded by his widow, Elizabeth, and not by Arthur Stedman (p. 102) The essay draws on documents from the Gansevoort-Lansing Collection and the Herman Melville Papers at the New York Public Library, and the Stedman Papers at Columbia's Rare Books Library. The authors use this evidence to argue that Elizabeth's hands-on contributions to these posthumous editions were crucial to scholars' later recovery efforts and amount to a "first Melville revival" prior to the one that began in 1919. Following on this research, other scholars have begun rethinking Elizabeth's role in the composition of Herman's late poetry.

Stein and Fales's collaborative work has been reprinted in The Oxford Companion to Herman Melville and featured in an episode of the C19 podcast. A sequel was published in the second edition of A Companion to Herman Melville.

Stein is also at work on a book-length study of the interwar publication of Herman Melville's novels in French translations during the twentieth century. This research has been supported with grants from the NEH and the American Philosophical Society.

== Works ==
=== Books ===
- Fantasies of Nina Simone. Duke University Press. 2024. ISBN 978-1-4780-3070-6.
- When Novels Were Books. Harvard University Press. 2020. ISBN 978-0-674-98704-3.
- Avidly Reads Theory. NYU Press. 2019. ISBN 978-1-4798-0100-8.

=== Edited volumes ===
- Stein, Jordan Alexander; Cohen, Lara Langer, eds. (2012). Early African American Print Culture. University of Pennsylvania Press. ISBN 978-0-8122-2334-7.
- Stein, Jordan Alexander; Murison, Justine S., eds. (2010). "Methods for the Study of Religion in Early American Literature". Early American Literature. 45 (1).

=== Essays and Book Chapters ===
- Fales, Adam; Stein, Jordan Alexander (March 2019). "'Copyright, 1892, by Elizabeth S. Melville': Rethinking the Field Formation of Melville Studies". Leviathan. 21 (1): 97–119. doi:10.1353/lvn.2019.0002.
  - Reprinted as Fales, Adam; Stein, Jordan Alexander (2025). "'Copyright, 1892, by Elizabeth S. Melville': Rethinking the Field Formation of Melville Studies". In Greiman, Jennifer; Jonik, Michael (eds.). The Oxford Companion to Herman Melville. New York: Oxford University Press. pp. 15–35.
- Stein, Jordan Alexander (December 2018). "How to Undo the History of Sexuality: Editing Edward Taylor's Meditations". American Literature. 90 (4): 753–784. doi:10.1215/00029831-7208536.
- Stein, Jordan Alexander (Spring 2018). "Herman Melville's Love Letters". ELH. 85 (1): 119–140. doi:10.1353/elh.2018.0004.
- Stein, Jordan Alexander (2014). "Archive Favor: African American Literature Before and After Theory". In Potts, Jason; Stout, Daniel (eds.). Theory Aside. Duke University Press. pp. 160–176.
- Stein, Jordan Alexander (Autumn 2013). "American Literary History and Queer Temporalities". American Literary History. 25 (4): 855–869. doi:10.1093/alh/ajt043.
