= Guy Maxwell Aylwin =

British architect

Guy Maxwell Aylwin AAdipl FRIBA (1889–1968) was a British architect, practising almost wholly in the West Surrey area around Farnham.

== Biography ==
=== Early career ===
Aylwin was articled with the Farnham practice of Niven & Wigglesworth between 1910 and 1913, which had its main offices in London, although the senior partner, David Barclay Niven (1864–1942) lived in Farnham. Harold Falkner had also been a pupil of Niven & Wigglesworth and for a time was in partnership with both men as Niven, Wigglesworth & Falkner. In an illustration by Paul Phipps of the pupils of Lutyens, one of the figures is of a G. Alwyn, but is not clear if this is the same person. In 1927, he joined Falkner in the firm of Falkner & Aylwin, but this was dissolved after only three years, in 1930, although Falkner continued to use the partnership name until 1932. From then on, Aylwin worked by himself until he was joined by his son, John Maxwell Aylwin and John's wife, both architects. His daughter Jill, also an architect, joined them in the offices. John died in 1999 and the Aylwin family practice of architects ceased to exist.

=== Falkner & Aylwin ===
Aylwin designed many buildings in a vernacular and Arts & Crafts style around Farnham, both houses and civic buildings, such as the Town Hall and the Bush Hotel in The Borough, Farnham. He also received much work from Courage Brewery in Alton, such as the Princess Royal and Jolly Farmer pubs in Runfold, the Seven Stars in East Street, Farnham being good examples of their type and designed with Falkner. He also designed the Wooden Bridge along the old A3 in Guildford.

=== Personal life ===
Like his sometime business partner and colleague, Falkner, Aylwin was educated at Farnham Grammar School. From there he went to King's College, London and the Architectural Association and was elected finally as a Fellow of the RIBA. He was married to Connie and they had four children - John, Jim, Jill and Tony. Both John and Jill became architects.

== Legacy ==
In 2010, a part of his archive and some of his architectural drawings and models were donated by his grandson, Richard Aylwin, to the Blower Foundation, where they are archived and maintained. He also edited and revised a history of architecture by HH Statham.

== Gallery ==
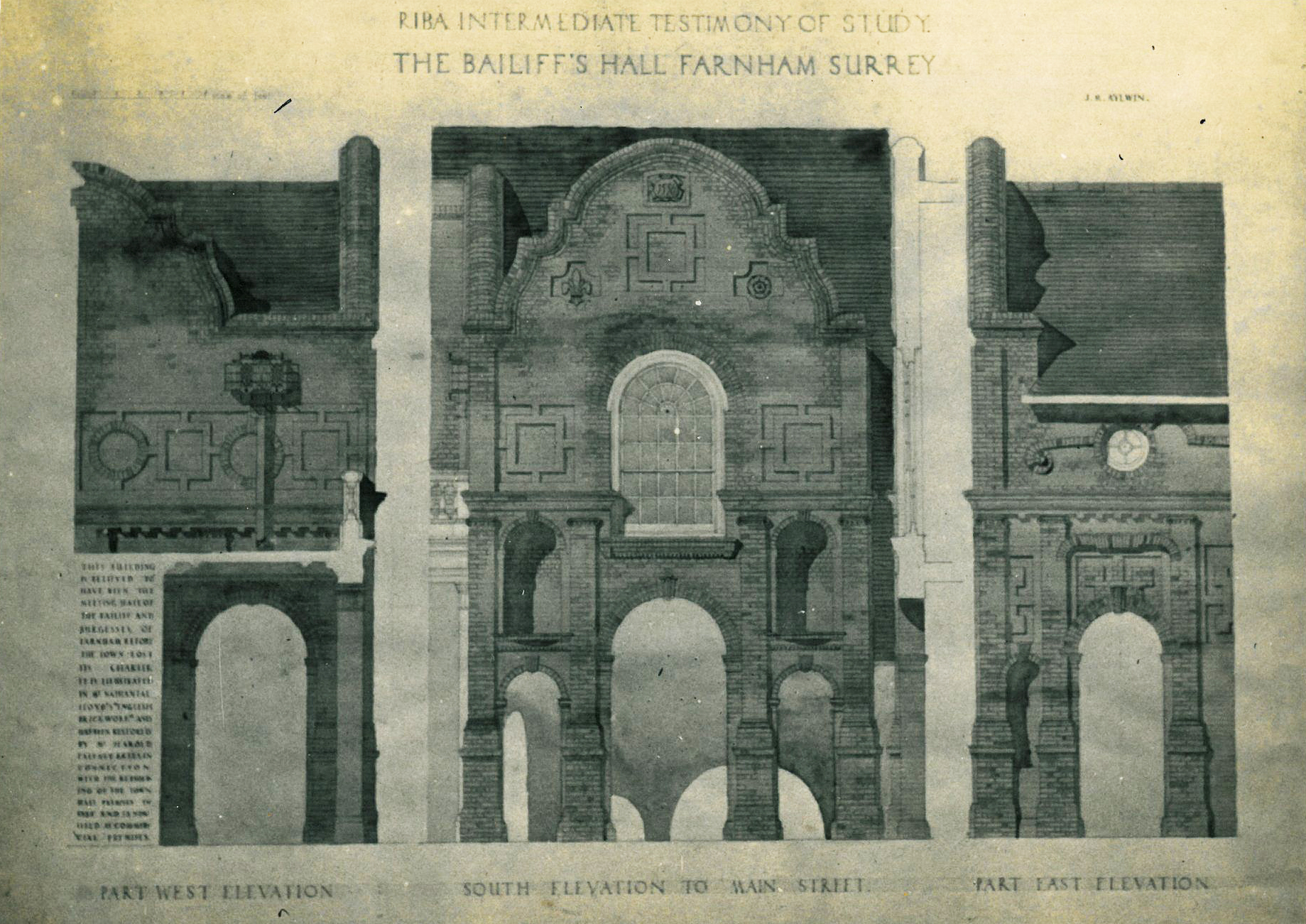
Drawing by Jill Maxwell Aylwin of her father Guy's restoration of the Bailiffs Hall undertaken with Harold Falkner in the mid 1930's

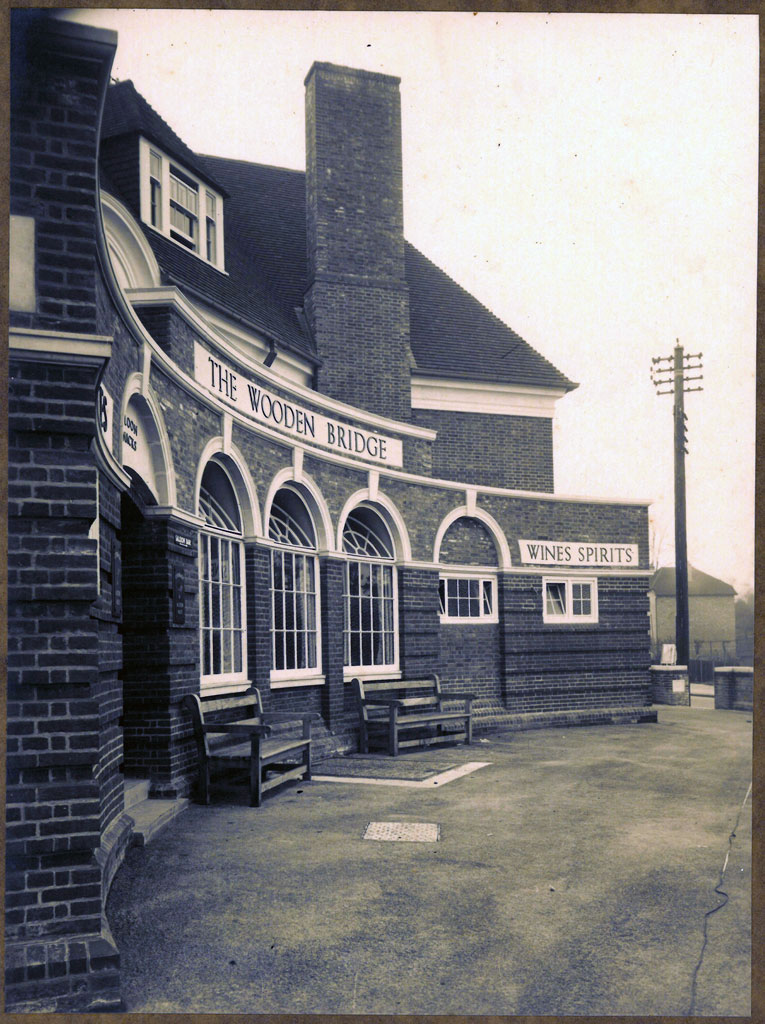
The Wooden Bridge Pub, Guildford by Guy Maxwell Aylwin for Courage Brewery, mid-1930's

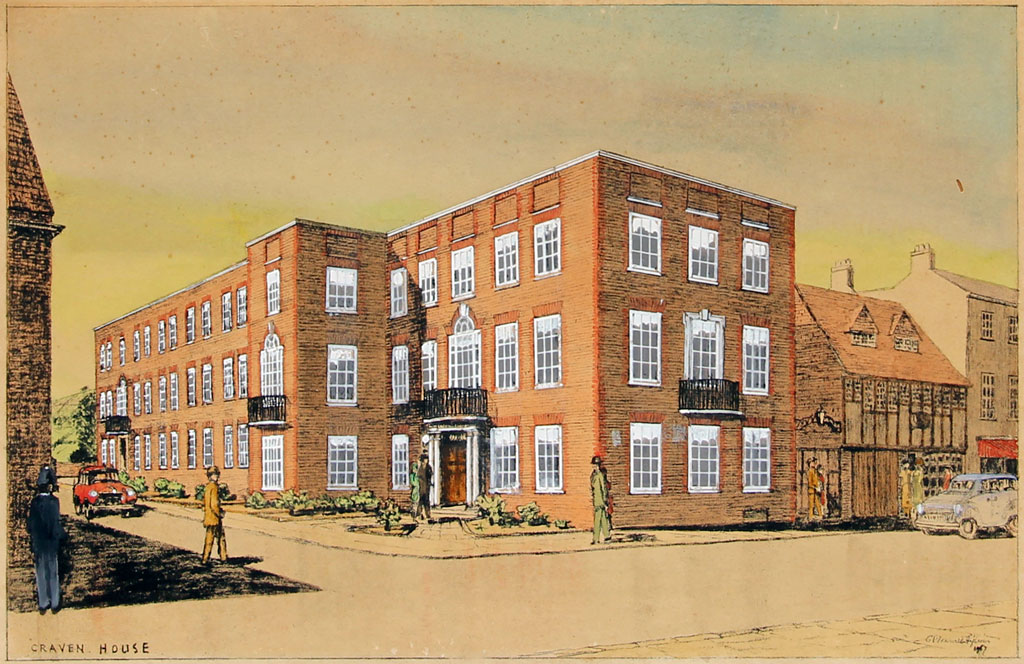
Perspective view of Craven House, The Hart, Farnham by Guy Maxwell Aylwin (Circa 1967)

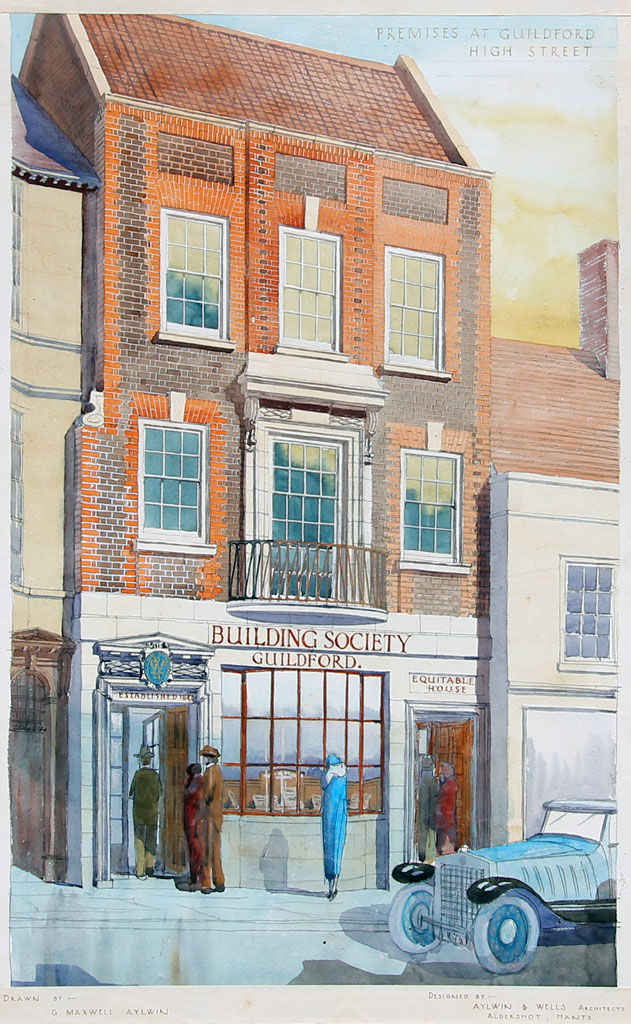
198 High Street, Guildford (formerly Equitable House), designed by Guy Maxwell Aylwin, circa 1930's

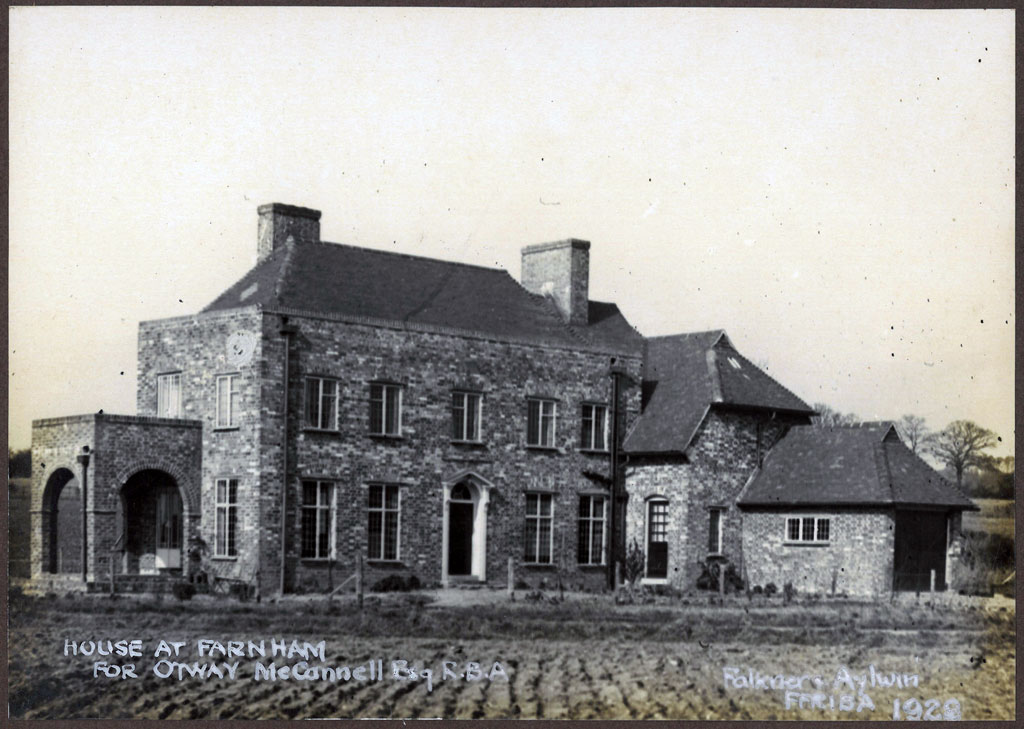
The McConnell House, Farnham, Surrey by Falkner & Aylwin, 1928

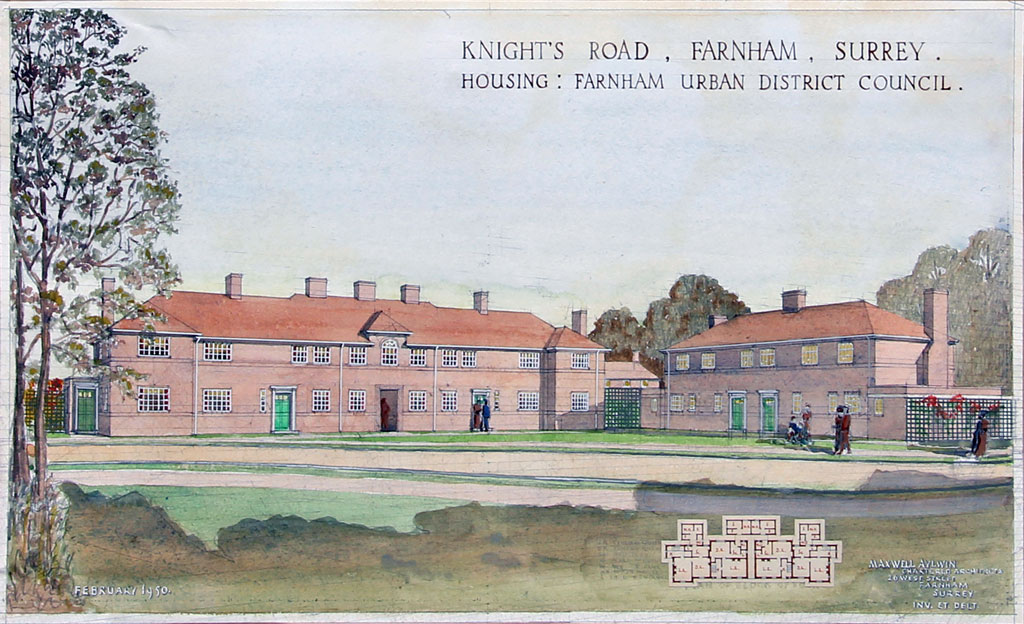
Proposal for Knights Road Housing, Farnham by Guy and John Maxwell Aylwin (1950)

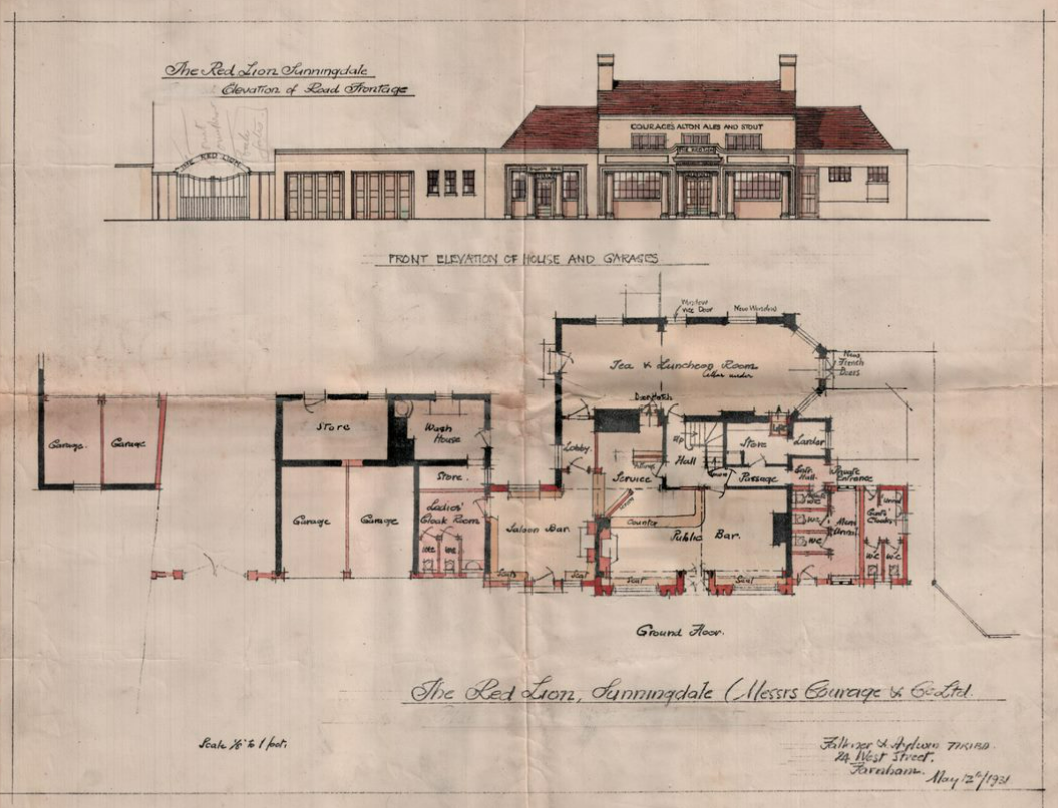
The Red Lion Pub, Sunningdale, Berkshire by Falkner & Aylwin for Courage Brewery (1931)

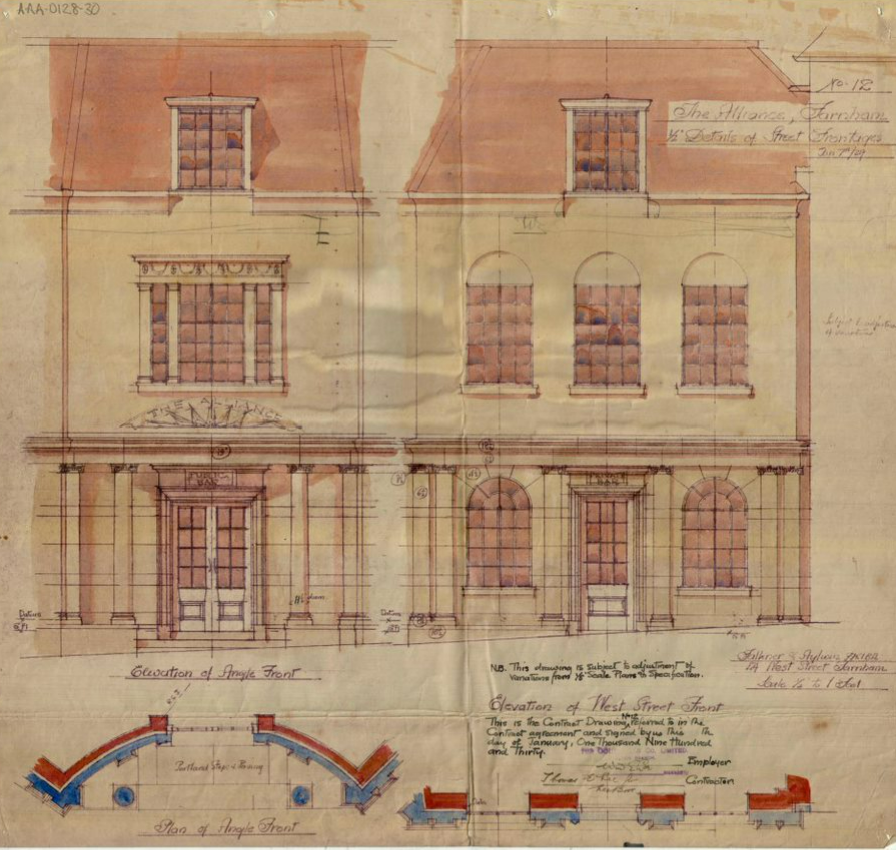
Former Alliance Pub, 12 Downing Street, Farnham by Falkner & Aylwin (1929)

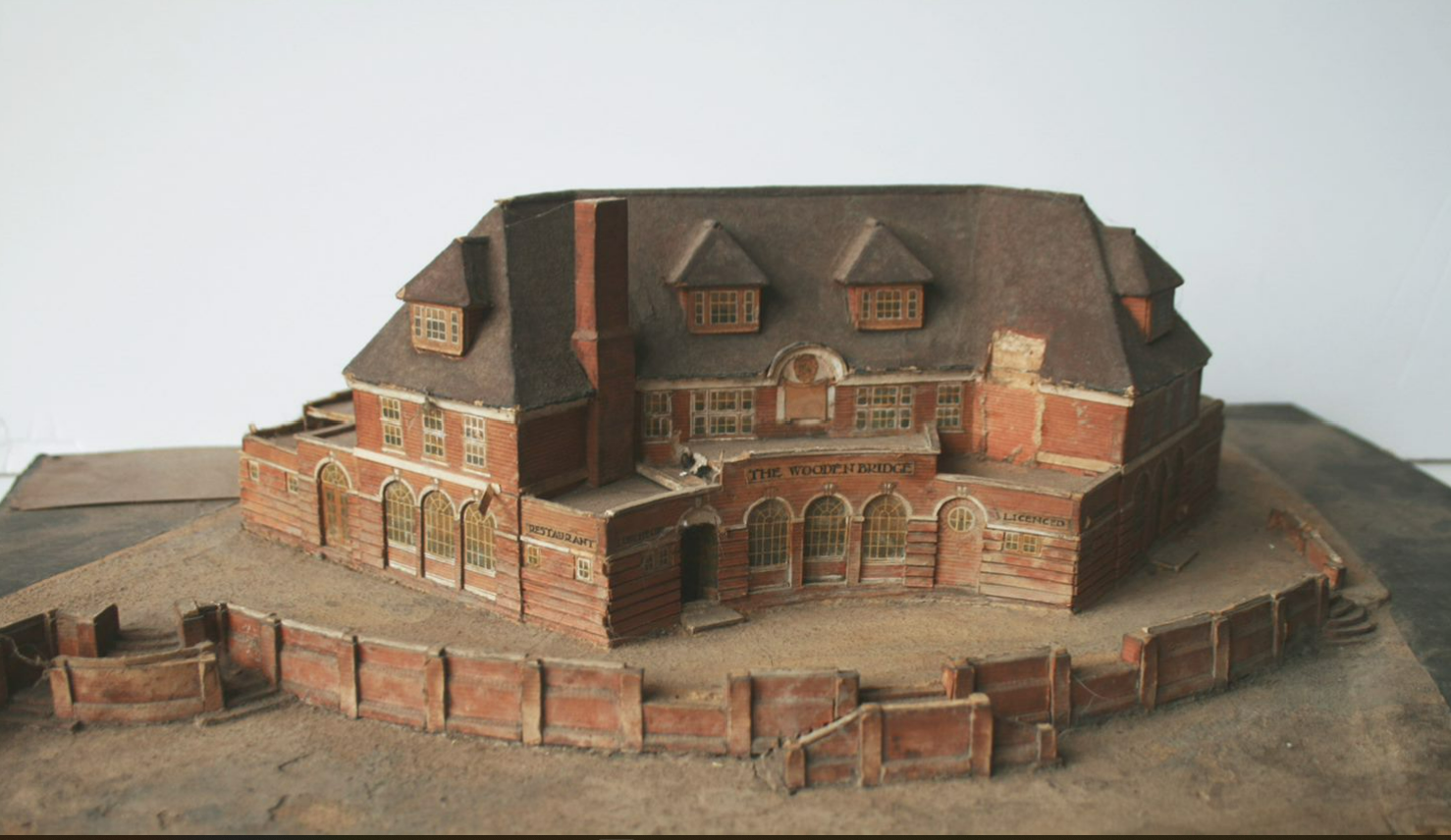
Model of Aylwin's Wooden Bridge Pub in Guildford

== Bibliography ==
- West Surrey Architects, by Christopher Budgen. Woking: Heritage of Waverley, 2002 (paperback, ISBN 0-9542131-0-6).
- Harold Falkner: More Than an Arts & Crafts Architect, by Sam Osmond. Chichester: Phillimore, 2003 (paperback, ISBN 1-86077-253-6).
- The Surrey Style, by Roderick Gradidge. Kingston: Surrey Historic Buildings Trust, 1991 (paperback, ISBN 0-9517022-0-3).
- A Short Critical History of Architecture, by Henry Heathcote Staham, 2nd Edition edited and revised by Guy Maxwell Aylwin. BT Batsford. 1927.
