= Roderick Gradidge =

English architect

Roderick Gradidge AA Dipl. ARIBA (3 January 1929 – 20 December 2000) was a British architect and writer on architecture, former Master of the Art Workers Guild and campaigner for a traditional architecture.

== Career ==
Gradidge was an evangelist for the Arts & Crafts, the Victorian and a Vernacular architecture which had become unfashionable by the beginning of his career. He became an expert on the architecture of this period and in particular in the County of Surrey (near his home at Chiswick).

=== Country house commissions ===
Gradidge had the opportunity to work on a number of buildings in Surrey by prominent architects, such as Sir Edwin Lutyens, Harold Falkner, Hugh Thackeray Turner, Detmar Blow and Charles Voysey. He completed a number of projects elsewhere, particularly with fine interiors and country houses. One of his finest country house commissions was for a large extension at Fulbrook House, one of Lutyens's finest and earliest country house commissions outside Farnham, Surrey and which he published in his book, The Surrey Style. He designed a library with David Hicks at Nicholas Hawksmoor's Easton Neston in the style of the English Baroque for Lord Hesketh, a Gothick conservatory at Cholmondeley Castle and altered Mount Stuart for Lord Bute.

Much of Gradidge's work on Surrey country houses was with the Surrey-based architect Michael Blower. Their first projects were on Voysey's New House in Haslemere and on Detmar Blow's Charles Hill Court for an Austrian industrialist. From there, they went onto Harold Falkner's Tancreds Ford, which they designed and built for the writer Ken Follett and his first wife, and which was published in two articles in Country Life. Next came Kingswood Hanger (The New House), reputedly designed by Hugh Thackeray Turner and for which they jointly won a RIBA Award, which was also published in Country Life. Just prior to Gradidge's death, he and Blower were working on a project at Combe Court, which was completed by Michael Blower and his sons through their architectural practice, Stedman Blower.

=== Other work ===
Gradidge worked on a number of pub interiors for Ind Coope, such as the Markham Arms (now altered) on the Kings Road, Chelsea and the Three Greyhounds in Soho, London. He restored the Gothic interior of E. W. Godwin's Northampton Guildhall, and the interior of Bodelwyddan Castle for the National Portrait Gallery, which won the Museum of the Year Award in 1989.

At St Marys, Bourne Street, South Kensington and the National Portrait Gallery in London, Gradidge carried out interior modifications, although they have since been altered. Further projects included additions to St Edmund's College, Cambridge (1990–3), Pugin's St Chads, Birmingham and St Augustine, Ramsgate.

=== Society activity ===
He was active in the Art Workers Guild being elected in 1969, served as the Guild's Secretary from 1977 to 1984 and was elected Master in 1987. He was a founding member of the Thirties Society (later to become the 20th Century Society), of which he was a Trustee for many years. He was also prominent in the Victorian Society.

== Personal life ==
Gradidge was born on 3 January 1929 in Old Hunstanton, Norfolk, and died 20 December 2000 in London, aged 71. He spent his childhood in India, where his father was a Brigadier. He then attended Stowe School.

After 2 years of National Service in Palestine, he moved to London and the Architectural Association, where he completed his training as an architect and was elected an Associate of the Royal Institute of British Architects (ARIBA). He remained in London practicing as an architect and writer for most of his life, where he was a prominent figure in social and architectural circles in the last half of the 20th century.

A large man, who was gay, Gradidge was an advocate of rational dress, a movement more usually associated with modernists, and had suits tailored in fine cloths that featured jackets and kilts. For much of his life he wore his hair uncut and tied as a plait, and took to tattoos and earrings as early as 1955. According to one memorialist: "With him it was not just a matter of not suffering fools gladly; he was reluctant to suffer anyone gladly." He was a long-time member of the congregation of the Anglo-Catholic St Mary's, Bourne Street, Belgravia, where his requiem mass was celebrated.

== Legacy ==
The Telegraph obituary described Gradidge as one of the most colourful and underrated English architects of recent years. Obituaries also appeared in The Times, The Guardian and The Independent.

Towards the end of his career, he was awarded a RIBA Award, (the gold-standard of architectural awards in the UK) for the design of a house in the Surrey Hills, completed with Michael Blower.

His legacy is limited in that he never completed a whole building from scratch and in so far as what remains of his work as an architect are wholly interiors, extensions, alterations and extensions to pre-existing buildings.

== Bibliography ==
- Dream Houses: The Edwardian Ideal, by Roderick Gradidge. Constable, 1980 (hardback, ISBN 0-09-461930-1).
- Edwin Lutyens: Architect Laureate, by Roderick Gradidge. London: George Allen & Unwin Ltd, 1981 (hardback, ISBN 978-0-04-720023-6).
- The Surrey Style, by Roderick Gradidge. Kingston: Surrey Historic Buildings Trust, 1991 (paperback, ISBN 0-9517022-0-3).
