= Patrick Blower =

British cartoonist (born 1959)

Patrick Blower (born 10 January 1959) is a British editorial cartoonist and painter whose work appears predominantly in the Daily Telegraph where he is the current chief political cartoonist. In 2023 he won the Political Cartoon Society’s Award for Political Cartoonist of the Year. He uses Blower mononymously when signing his cartoons for publication.

== Biography ==
=== Early life and education ===
Patrick Blower was born in Brussels to an English architect father, Michael Blower and a Belgian mother, Bernadette (nee Muûls) who met whilst both were working at Brussels World's Fair in 1958. He is the eldest of six children and was educated at Farnham Grammar School and University College London where he read English Literature. In 2008 he gained an MA in Art & Space at Kingston University. He is a fluent French speaker.

=== Cartoons and illustration ===
Soon after university, he spent time in the US, developing his painting and travelling across the country, drawing his experience. His first published commission appeared in the East Village Eye. He returned to Britain and began freelancing as an illustrator after joining the government's Enterprise Allowance Scheme. His work has appeared in most British newspapers and magazines including The Times, Sunday Times, Mail on Sunday, The Guardian, Daily Express, Private Eye and The Spectator. Blower succeeded JAK as the Evening Standard editorial cartoonist in 1997, remaining there until 2003. Shortly afterwards, he conceived a time-lapse animation technique named Livedraw and went on to produce regular animated cartoons for BBC Newsnight and the BBC 10 O'Clock News in addition to drawing weekly animated political cartoons for The Guardian from 2009-2011. He was filmed by the BBC in 2019 as he drew and talked about the process of conceiving a cartoon to a tight deadline. He co-produced the animation How Pandemics Spread for the launch of TED Ed and also created the drawings for an animation which was at the centre of an award-winning exhibition commemorating the centenary of The Spanish Flu for the Florence Nightingale Museum. In 2017, he became a regular contributor to the Daily Telegraph and succeeded as chief political cartoonist in 2021. In 2021 he won the Political Cartoon Society’s Strube Spoon for runner-up political cartoonist of the year and in 2023, the Award for Political Cartoonist of the Year.

=== Painting ===
His work has been selected for exhibitions at the Mall Galleries including the Threadneedle Prize exhibition and The Lynn Painter-Stainers show. His work was also selected for the Royal Academy Summer Exhibition in 2021 and 2022.

=== Personal life ===
Blower is widowed with three adult children and lives in London.

== Bibliography ==
- Dictionary of Twentieth-Century British Cartoonists and Caricaturists, by Mark Bryant (2000) (Ashgate, Aldershot) ISBN 1-84014-286-3
- The Cartoon Century, by Timothy S Benson (2000) (Random House) ISBN 978-1905211593
- Britain’s best political cartoons, by Tim Benson (2021) (Random House) ISBN 978-1473596535
- Britain’s best ever political cartoons, by Tim Benson (2021) (John Murray Press) ISBN 978-1529334395
- Cartoons from the Daily Telegraph Best of Blower 2017-21, (2021) (Signature)
