= Arthur Stedman =

British architect

Arthur J Stedman FRIBA (1868–1958) was a British architect in the Late-Victorian and Edwardian periods. He was a prominent architect in and around Farnham, Surrey where he was educated, lived and died.

== Biography ==
=== Career ===
Arthur's career flourished in the country house boom up to World War I, moving onto larger public works in the great expansion of municipal works projects in the interwar period. He finally retired in 1955 at the age of 87. He completed a number of fine works in West Surrey, including his own offices at 36 South Street (now demolished) and the McDonald Almshouses in West Street, Farnham and some fine Edwardian country houses. He was also responsible for some fine restoration and infill projects within the historic urban fabric of Farnham, complementing the Georgian style that predominates there: His design for 49 Castle Street, Pevsner called a very good imitation. He was a near contemporary of Edwin Lutyens, an architect whose buildings litter the countryside and towns of West Surrey and in whose London office, Arthur's 2nd son, Leonard, was articled as a young man. Stedman was just 1 year younger than Lutyens and 7 years older than the other eminent Farnham architect, Harold Falkner.

Arthur apprenticed as an architect in the traditional way, with a firm of Farnham builders and attended night classes at Farnham Art School, (forerunner of the University for the Creative Arts). He finally set up his own office in 1895 at the age of 28 and was elected RIBA in 1910 and a Fellow (FRIBA) before the War. He was Guildford Diocesan Surveyor from 1925–1950 and taught drawing and building technology at the Farnham School of Art. He was sometime President of the South-East Society of Architects, a Fellow of the Royal Institute of British Architects (RIBA) and founding partner of the eponymous firm of architects, AJ Stedman FRIBA (later reincarnated in order as AJ & LR Stedman FRIBA, Stedman & Blower FRIBA and finally as today, Stedman Blower Architects). He was an exhibitor in the Royal Academy Annual Exhibition and appeared in various annuals of Who's Who in Architecture (1914 & 1923).

=== Farnham Cricket Club ===
He was Founding President of the revived Farnham Cricket Club. The Stedman Cricket Cup is awarded in his memory by the FCC.

=== Personal life ===
Arthur Stedman was born in Normandy, Guildford, in 1868, from a family of wheelwrights. He was succeeded in his business (AJ & LR Stedman) by his son Leonard R Stedman. He died in 1958 at the age of 90. An extensive obituary was published in The Farnham Herald and also in The Builder.

== Leonard R Stedman ==
Leonard R Stedman BSc ARIBA (1899–1981) joined his father's practice in 1922, henceforth known as AJ & LR Stedman, joining as Partner in 1935. Leonard was born on 2 September 1899 and attended Farnham Grammar School and Cranleigh School, after which he attended the Bartlett School of Architecture, University College, London. He spent his War years in the Royal Artillery, the Pay Corps and as Garrison Engineer. He married Lois Monckton in 1928. His career tracks that of the prominent Farnham architect Harold Falkner, who is now considered an important figure in the vernacular arts & crafts revival in the 20th century. Leonard Stedman completed a number of projects in the locality, such as the Royal Deer shops on South Street and the Magistrates Court in Farnham. He also refurbished the Great Conservatory at Syon House for the Duke of Northumberland and converted a former riding school for the National Army Museum at Sandhurst. Leonard was active in local amenity societies and was for a time, President of the South-East Society of Architects. His architectural practice was taken over by Partner, Michael Blower FRIBA in 1968, on his retirement. Leonard died in 1981 at the age of 81 and was survived by his son Tom, daughter Ann and by two grandchildren, Gareth and Diana. An extensive obituary was published in The Farnham Herald. John Clenshaw (1928-2018) was a lifelong employee of Leonard, first joining the practice as a young apprentice in 1947, becoming an Associate with the practice as his career progressed after National Service with REME. He remained in the service of the practice into semi-retirement in the late 2000s, an almost unique record of singular service of over 60 years.

== Gallery ==
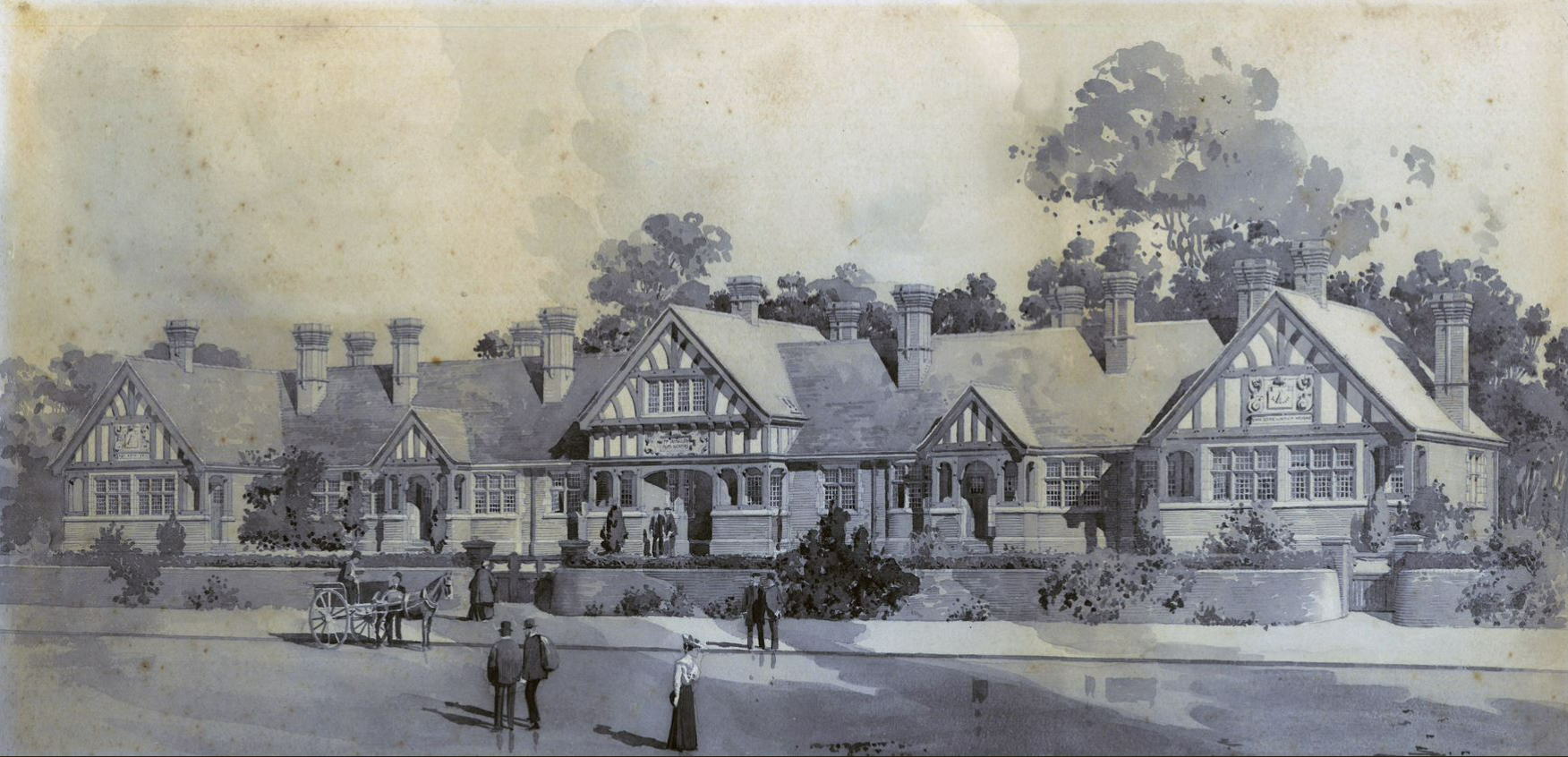
Macdonald’s Almshouses, West Street, Farnham, Surrey (Circa 1905/6), by Arthur J Stedman (1868-1858) for George Edward Macdonald Will Trust.

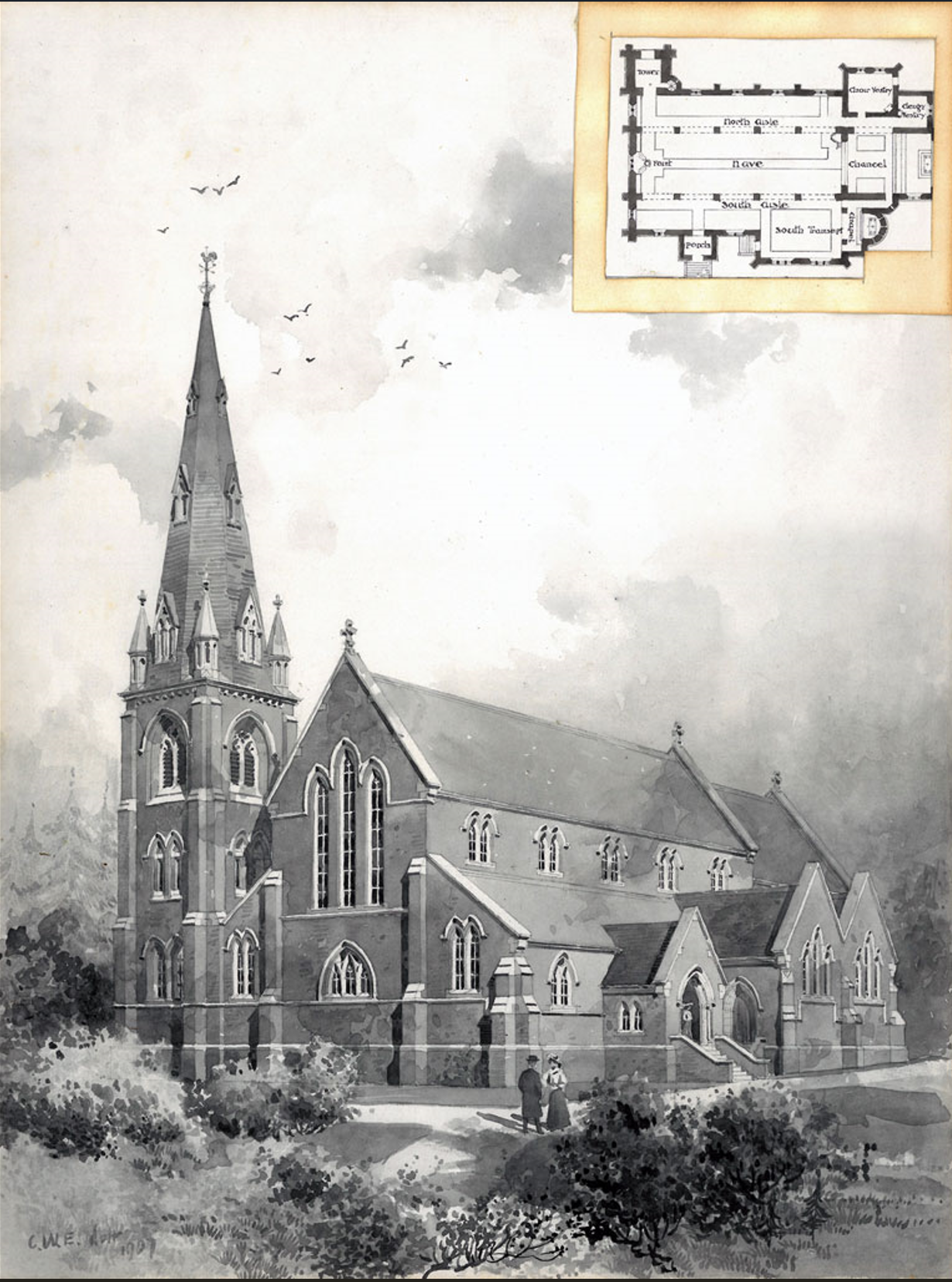
Project for a church in Ash Vale, Surrey by Arthur Stedman (Circa early 1900's)

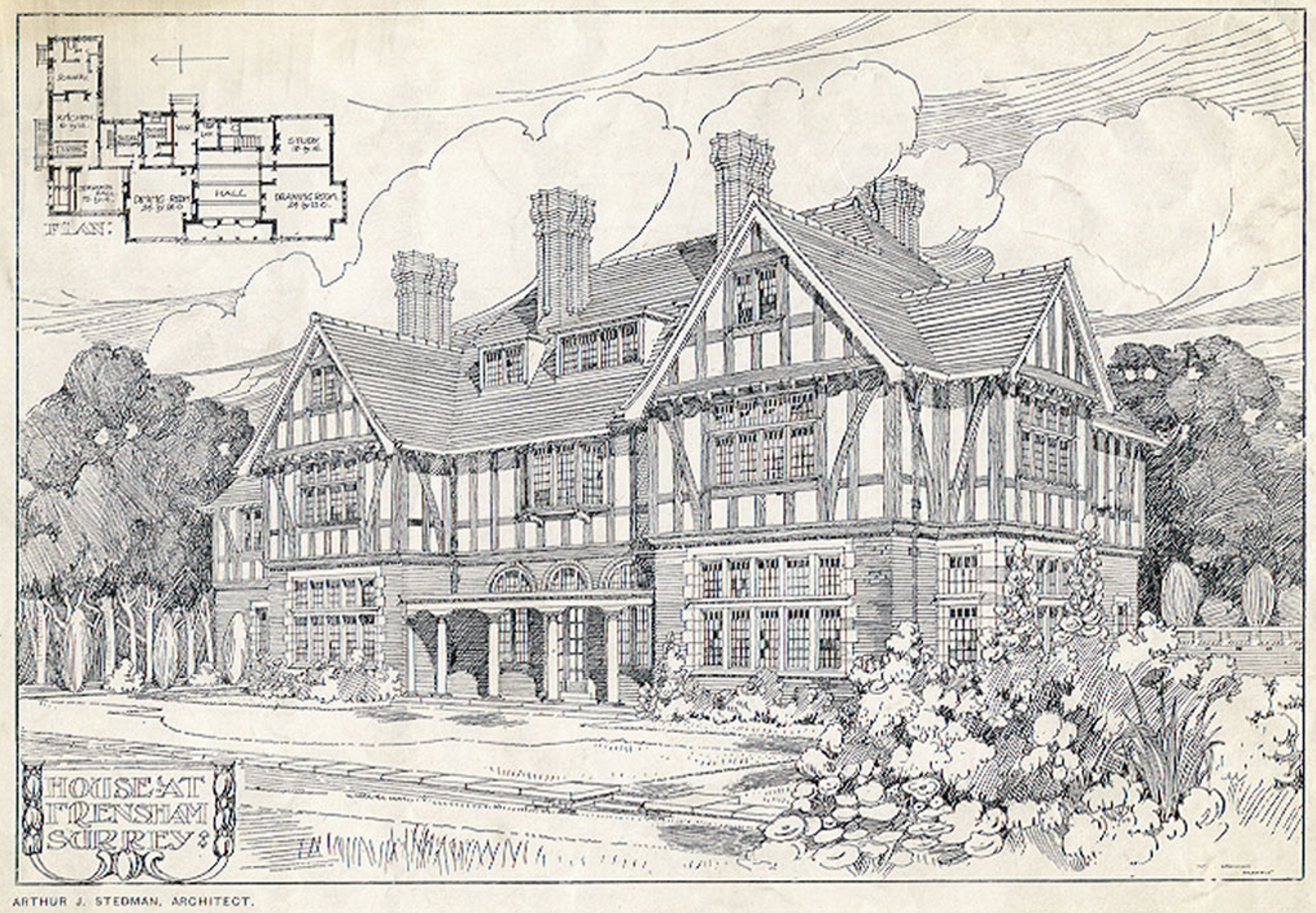
Frensham Grange, Frensham, Surrey by Arthur Stedman (1908)

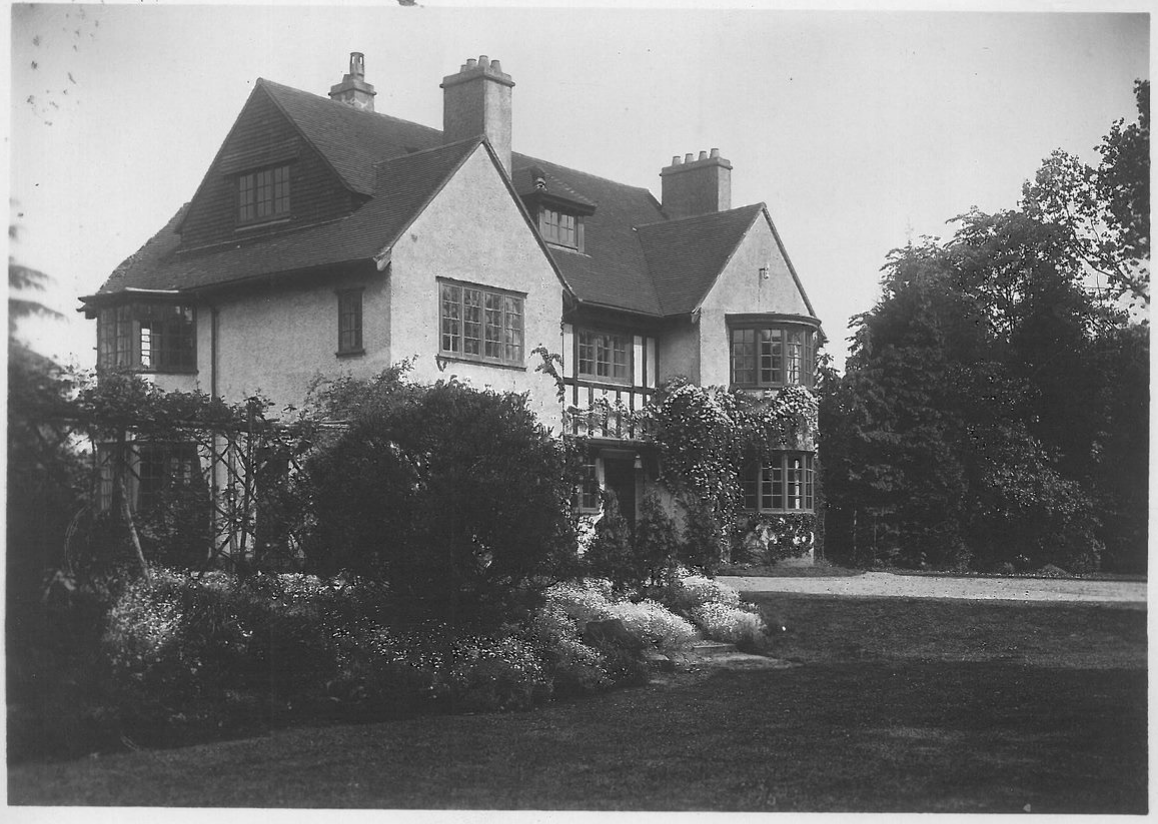
New House, Tilford Way, Farnham by Arthur Stedman (1900)

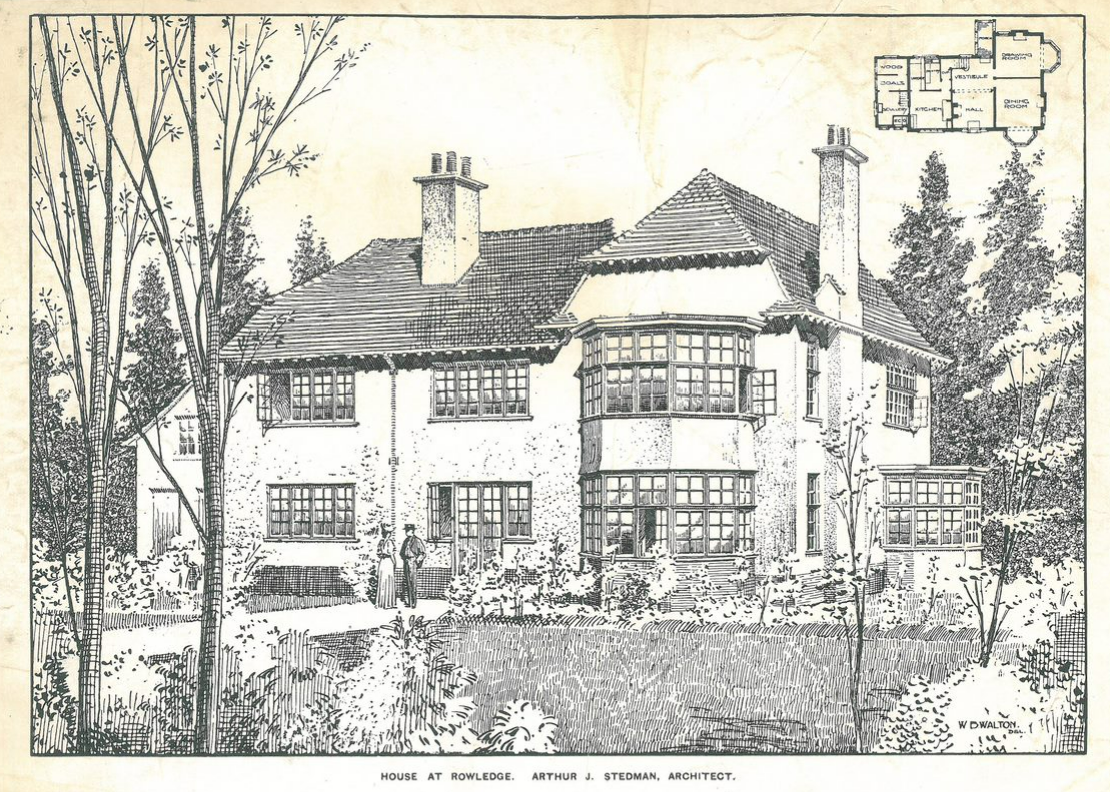
Proposal for a house at Rowledge, Farnham, Surrey by Arthur Stedman

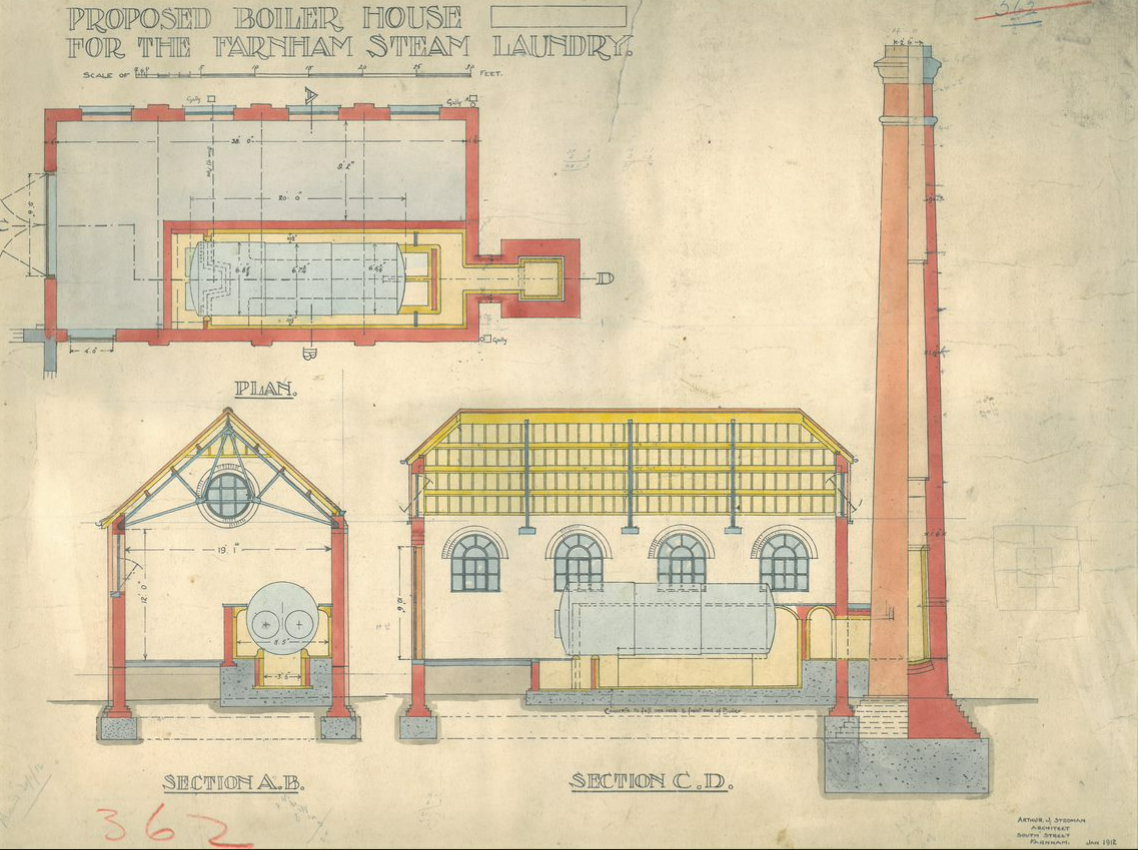
Proposal for Farnham Steam Laundry, East Street, Farnham by Arthur Stedman (1912)

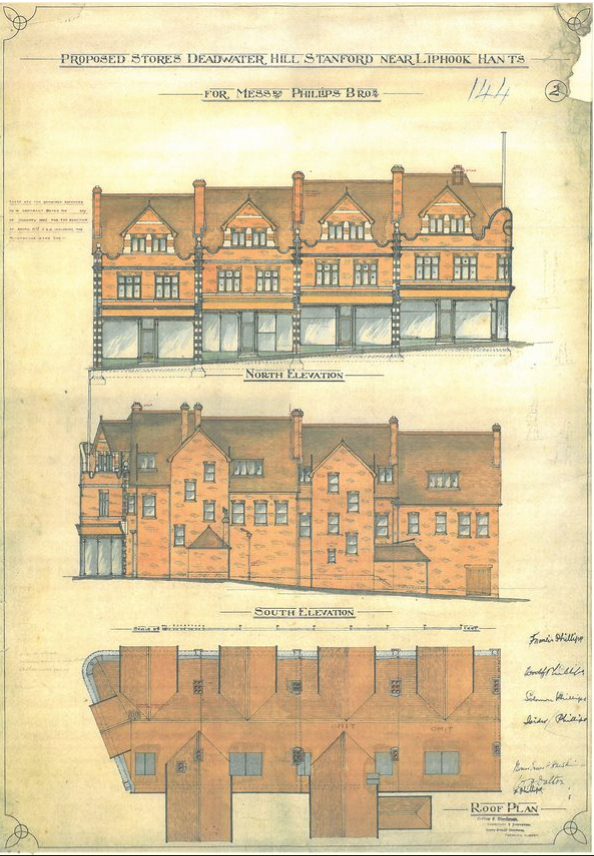
Proposals for shops/stores at Stanford, Hampshire by Arthur Stedman (Circa 1900)

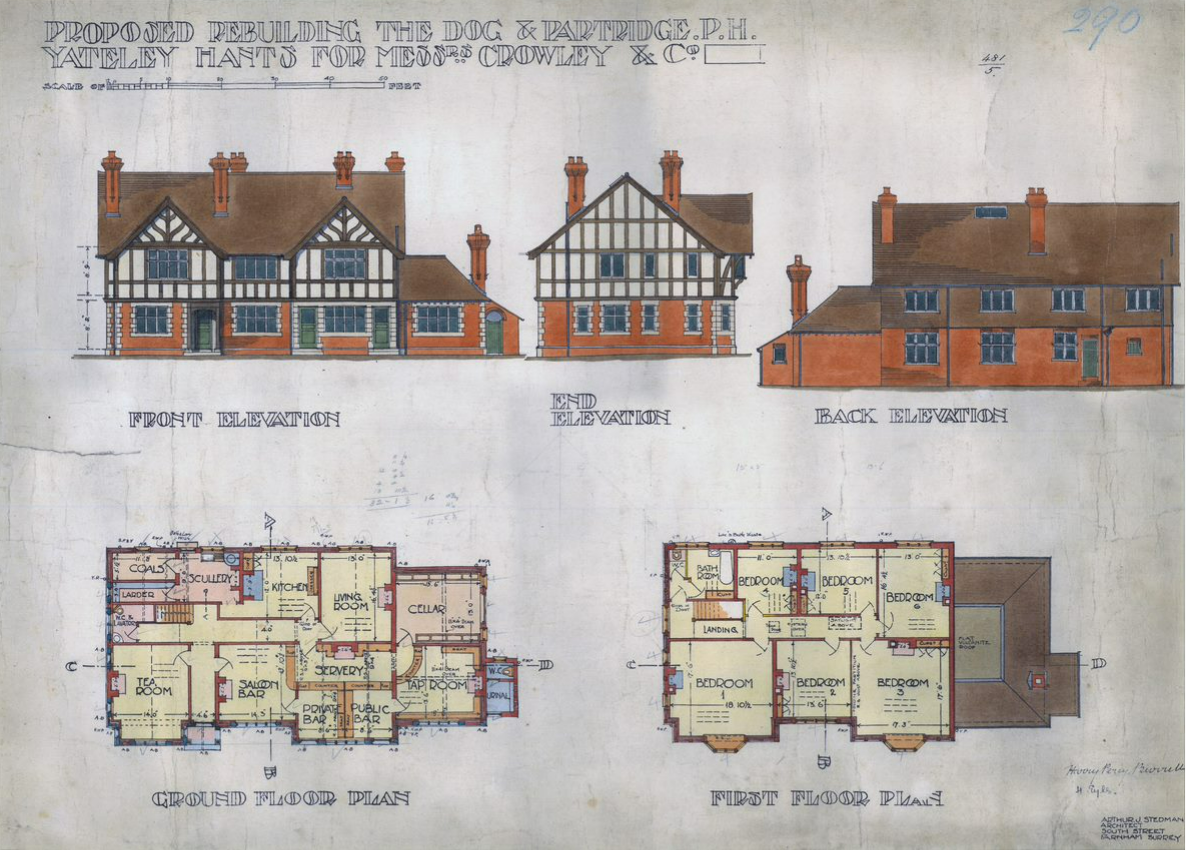
Dog & Partridge Pub, Yateley, Hampshire

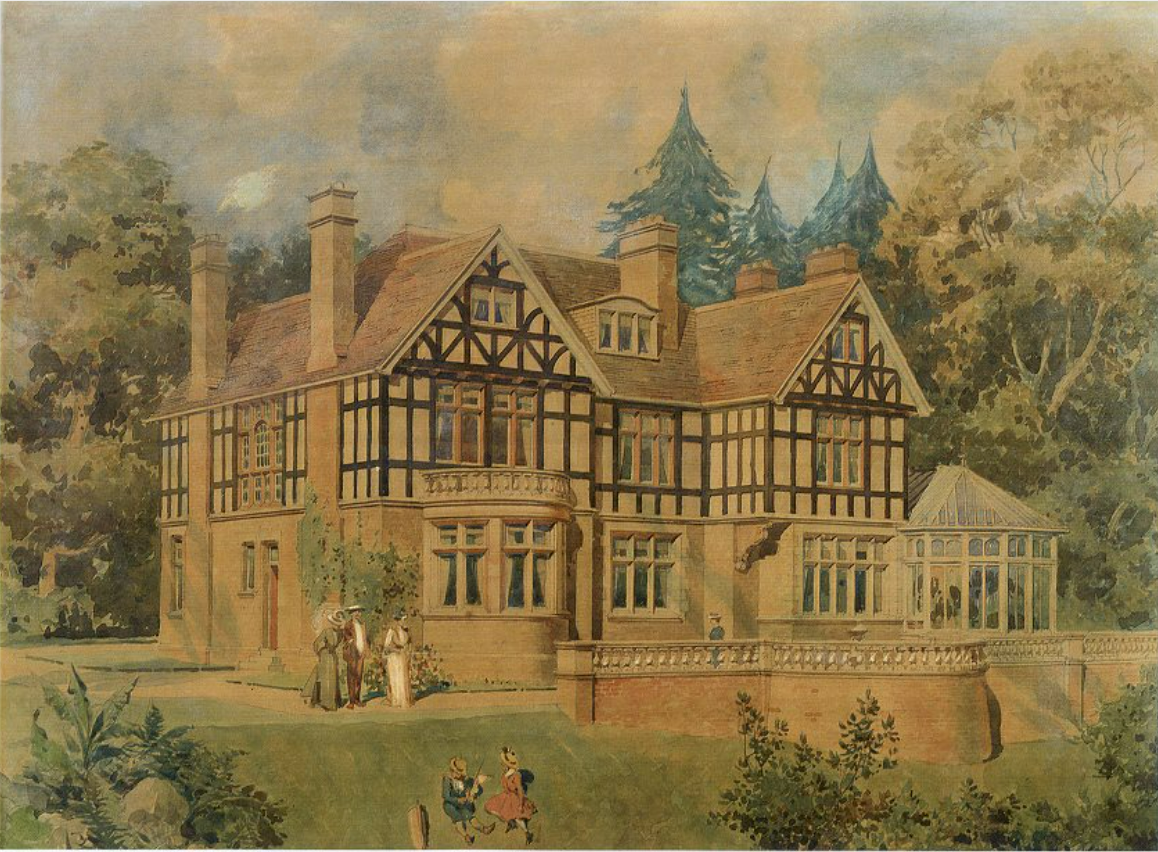
Proposals for a house in Frimley, Surrey by Arthur Stedman (Early 1900's)

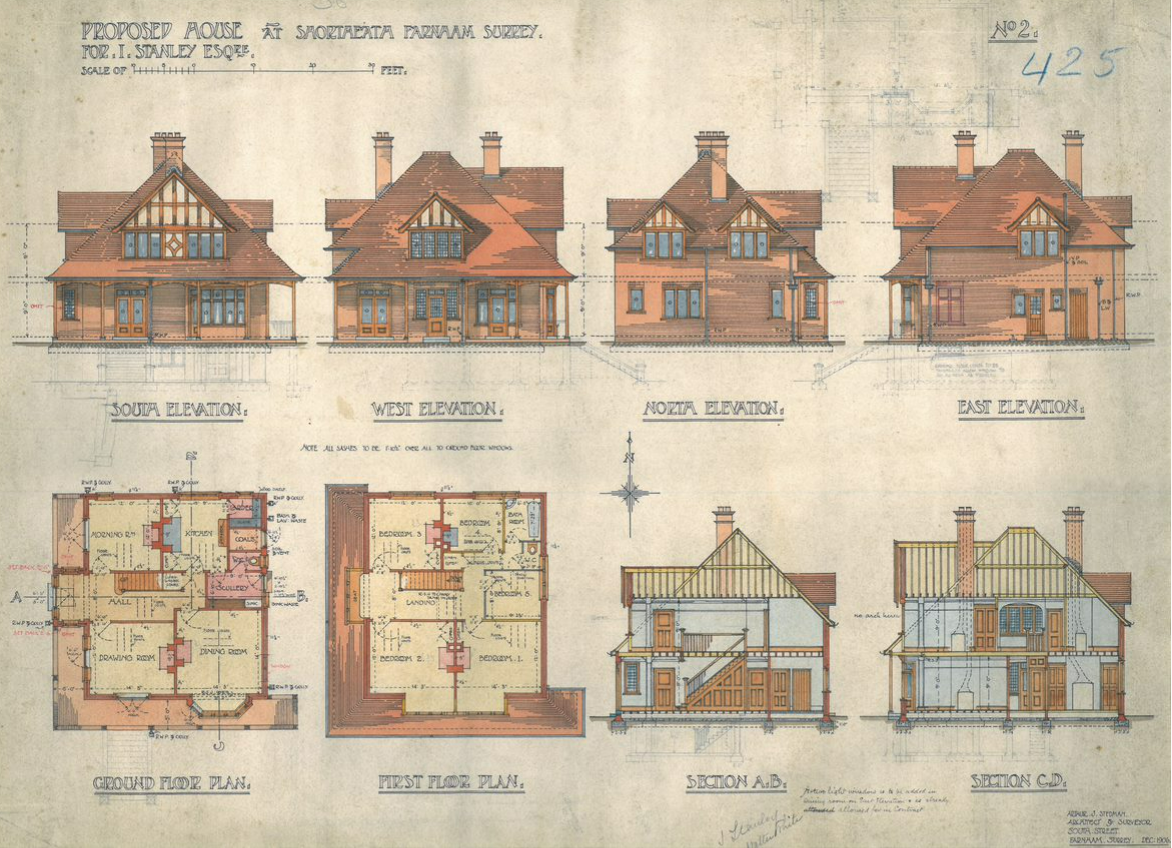
Proposals for a house at Shortheath, Farnham by Arthur Stedman (1908)

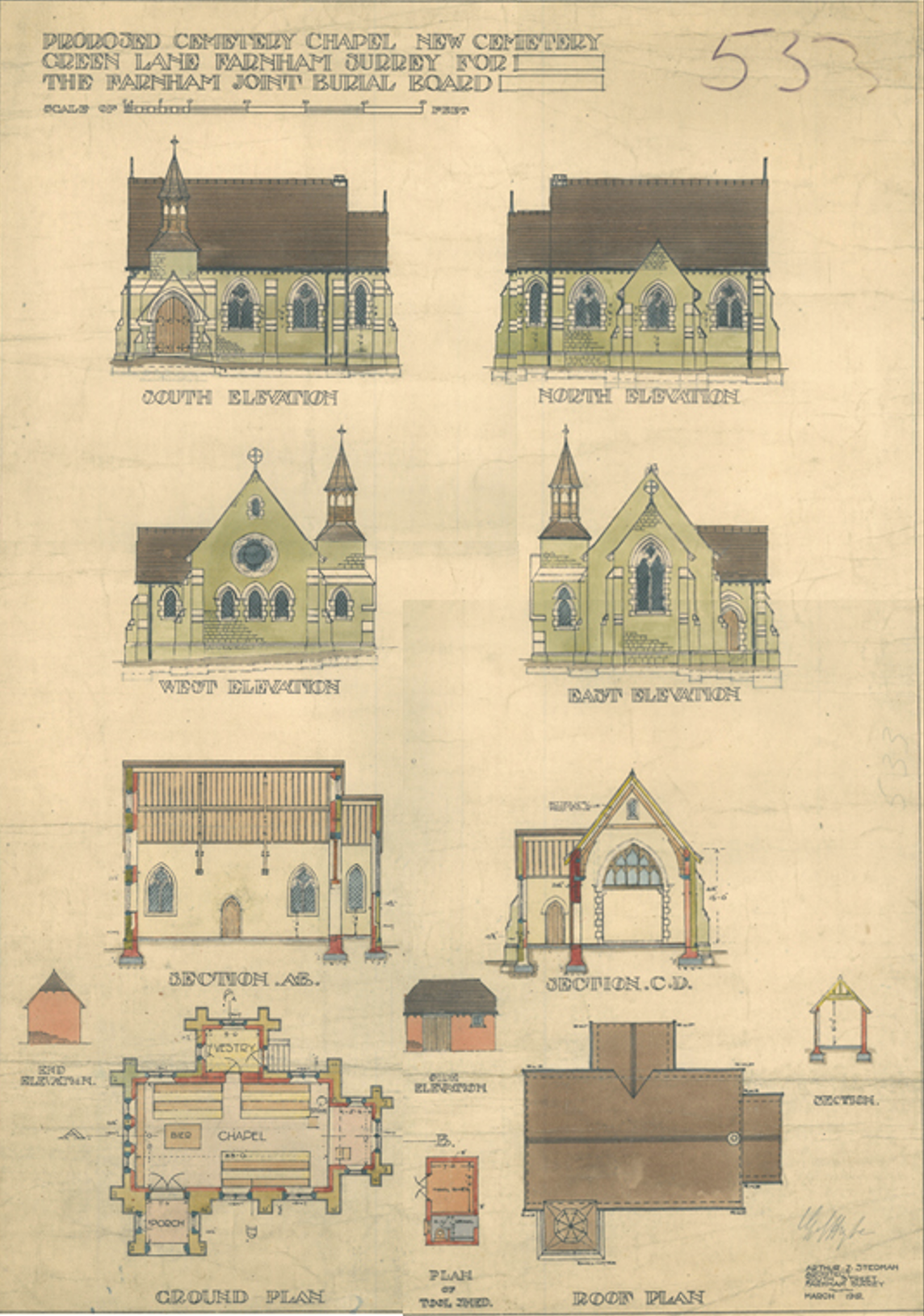
Proposals for Cemetery Chapel at Green Lane, Farnham by Arthur Stedman (1912)

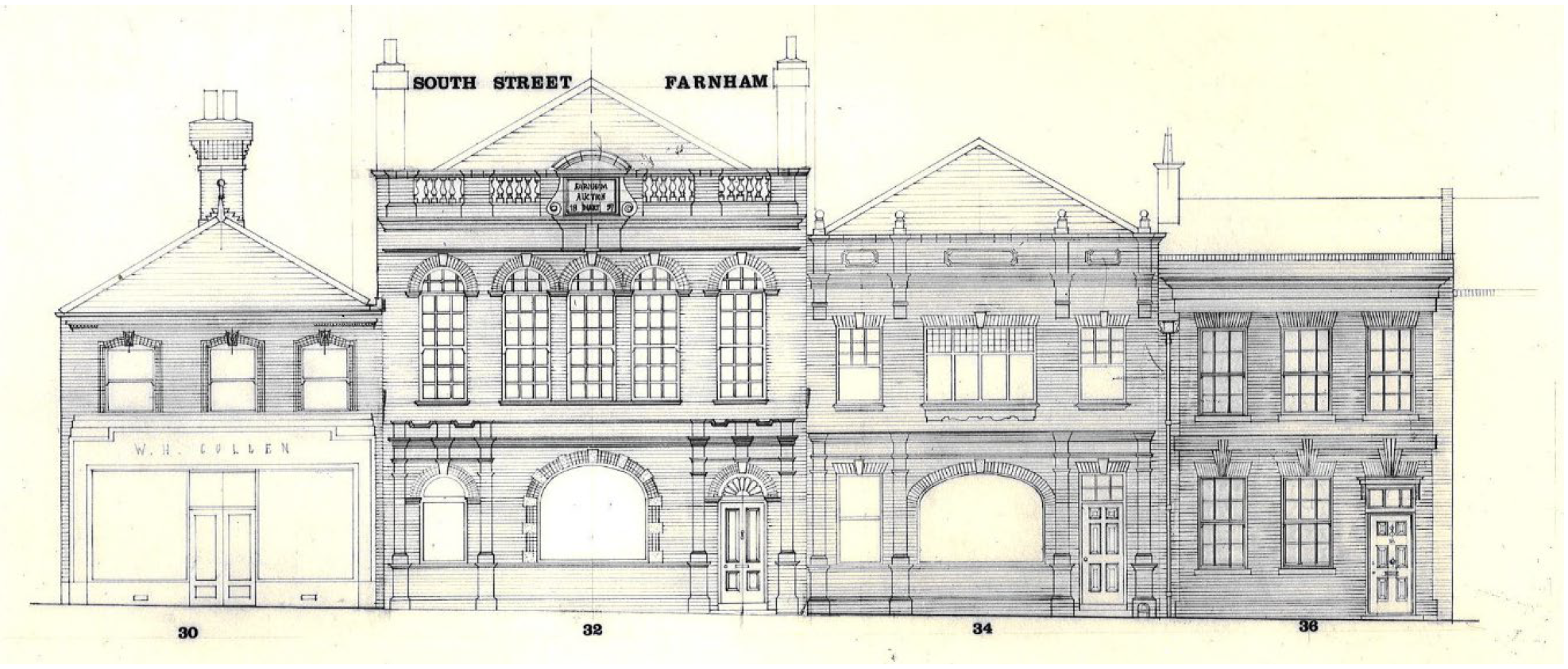
Elevational line drawing of 30-36 South Street, Farnham, Surrey prior to demolition in 1990, by Michael Blower

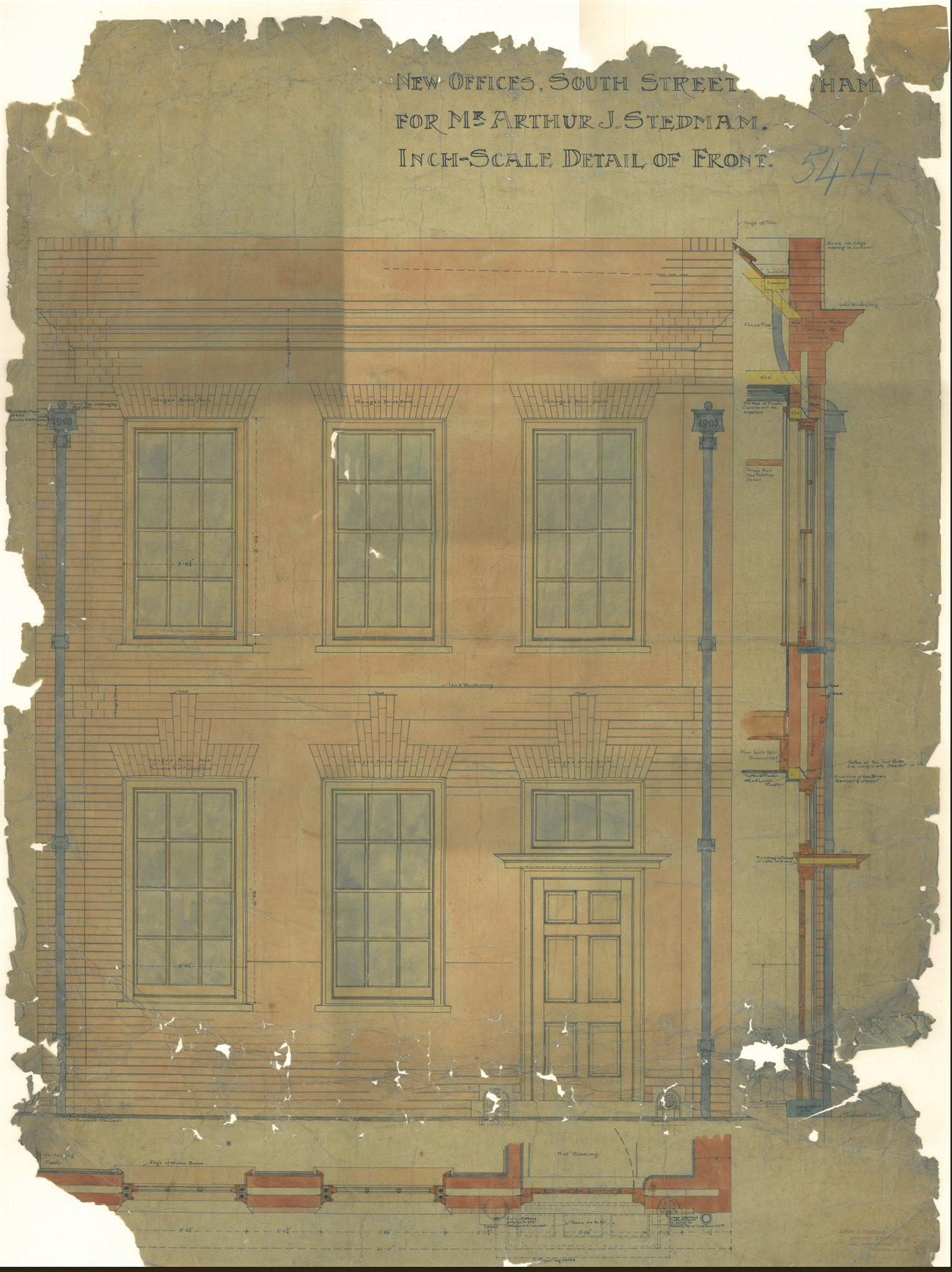
Elevational drawing of 36 South Street, Farnham by Arthur Stedman for his own offices (early 1900's)

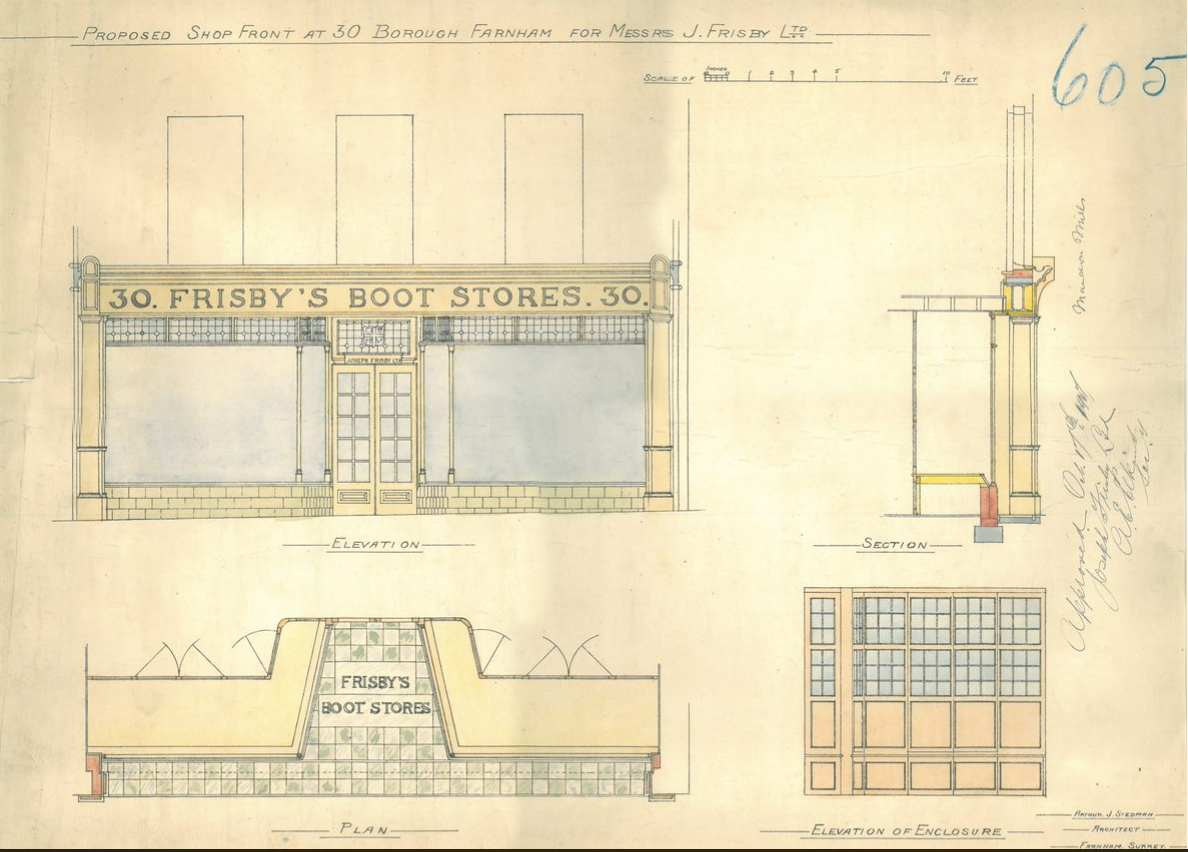
Proposal for shopfront at 30 The Borough, Farnham, Surrey by Arthur Stedman (1907)

== Legacy ==
The Blower Foundation (for cultural Connection) holds an archive of the Stedmans' drawings, correspondence and projects dating back to 1895. The Blower Foundation is a UK Registered Charitable Trust (No: 1106369) devoted to the study of the UK's cultural heritage, with a particular emphasis on the built environment and architecture in the South-East Region.
