= John Winter (architect) =

British architect (1930–2012)

- Born: 16 May 1930; Norwich
- Died: 12 November 2012 (aged 82); Cambridge
- Occupation: Architect
- Practice: John Winter & Associates

John Winter (16 May 1930 – 12 November 2012) was a British architect born in Norwich who lived and worked in London. He was well known for his modernist designs, and was reported to have never have had a planning application refused.

Winter had two sons, Timothy (now Abdul-Hakim Murad), Henry, the football correspondent for The Daily Telegraph, and a daughter, Martha, an artist.

== Career ==
Winter started his architectural career in Norwich where he completed a pupillage under an Arts and Crafts architect. From 1950 to 1953 he studied at the Architectural Association in London and subsequently undertook national service with the Royal Engineers and learned to weld. He returned to education in the U.S. where he studied at Yale and then moved to San Francisco, where he worked for both Skidmore, Owings & Merrill and Charles Eames. Winter eventually returned to great England and joined the office of Ernő Goldfinger, before setting up his own private practice John Winter & Associates.

Winter wrote for various publications throughout his career including the Daily Telegraph and the Architectural Review, and in 1970 published Industrial Architecture: A Survey of Factory Buildings.

The National Portrait Gallery has two colour print portraits of Winter in its collection.

Winter retained close links with the Architectural Association during his career, teaching from 1960 to 1964 with students including Jeremy Dixon, Edward Jones and Nicholas Grimshaw, and went on to become a member of Council, Honorary Secretary and as a trustee of the AA Foundation.

== Built projects ==
- 21 Upton Close, Norwich, Norfolk NR4 7PD (1956, demolished 2023)
- 2 Regal Lane, London NW1 7TH (1961)
- 10-11 Regal Lane, London NW1 7TH (1961–63)
- Days & Son Offices, Hounslow, London
- 35 Ornan Road, Hampstead, London (1971)
- 12 Alma Road, Wandsworth, London SW18 1AB (1973)
- Morley College, Lambeth, London SE1 7HT (1973–5; 1979–82)
- Virginia Water House, Wentworth (1966)
- 85 Mansell Street, London E1 8AN (1991)
- Cor-ten house, 81 Swain's Lane, Highgate (1969; Grade II* listed)
- Woughton Village housing, Milton Keynes (1974)
- 85 Swain's Lane house, Highgate (1982, demolished 2008)
