= Raymond Jackson ("JAK") =

British cartoonist

Raymond Jackson, best known by his pen-name JAK (11 March 1927 in Marylebone – 27 July 1997 in Wimbledon) was one of Britain's best-known newspaper cartoonists, working for the London Evening Standard from 1952 onwards.

== Life ==
JAK was born Raymond Allen Jackson on 11 March 1927 in Marylebone, London. He trained as a commercial artist at Willesden School of Art after a period in the Army Education Corps where he taught painting "in the style of Jackson Pollock".

After working for an advertising agency and various magazines including Punch and Lilliput he joined the Evening Standard in 1952. Starting as a general artist and illustrator on the television page, he eventually in 1965 succeeded "Vicky" as the Standard 's Political Cartoonist.

His predecessors were "Vicky" and "Low". As such, the views expressed in his cartoons were sometimes highly controversial; one 1970 cartoon that nearly led to the Evening Standard being closed by industrial action caricatured power workers, then on strike for improved conditions, as stupid, greedy and deaf to reason. JAK's cartoons frequently depicted negative views of Irish people. One cartoon, printed in 1982 as a comment on the Northern Ireland situation, depicted a film poster advertising "The Ultimate In Psychopathic Horror - The Irish" and caused Ken Livingstone, then leader of the Greater London Council, to withdraw all advertising from the paper.

His cartoons were drawn in ink on 17-by-21 1/2-inch (430 mm × 550 mm) abraded board using a mapping pen and a brush. His figures were distinguished by having three fingers on their hands and he signed his name, in capitals with characteristic "blob" serifs, in the bottom right or left corner. He also took lessons for many years in landscape drawing, even while working in Fleet Street. He was also a black belt in judo.

Many of his cartoons were republished in a series of Christmas annuals. His framed drawings were collected by many of the subjects who appeared in them. Some of his cartoons are in public archives including the Victoria & Albert Museum. The Queen's Elm pub in Old Church Street, Chelsea was once decorated throughout with his cartoons.

He was a founder member of the British Cartoonists' Association in 1965 and admired by fellow cartoonists. He once said "You've got to laugh, laughter is the best way out of trouble. I'll laugh all the way right up to the execution chamber."

As well as the Evening Standard, he also drew for the Mail on Sunday, the Daily Express and the Sunday Express.

He died in Wimbledon, South-West London, on 27 July 1997 aged 70. He was succeeded at the Standard by Patrick Blower.
