= Surrey Historic Buildings Trust =

Charitable organisation founded in the south east of England

Coordinates: 51°24′17.6″N 0°18′16.5″W

The Surrey Historic Buildings Trust (sometimes abbreviated as SHBT) is a charitable organisation founded in 1980 that works to preserve the architectural heritage of Surrey, in the south east of England.

== History ==
The Trust was formed in 1980 to help preserve the historic architectural heritage in Surrey for the benefit of future generations by purchasing, selling, and restoring buildings, as well as by making grants and providing advice to owners. It is both a registered charitable trust and a company limited by guarantee.

The money employed by the Trust originated in a single founding donation of £25,000 by a former High Sheriff of Surrey, Philip Henman, matched by a grant by Surrey County Council.

The trust is managed by a board including members from Surrey County Council, the Surrey Local Government Association, and the Surrey Branch of the Council for the Protection of Rural England. Its advisory 'Working Group' includes architects, planners, conservationists, and archaeologists.

Since 1980, the Trust has been instrumental in several projects for the restoration and conversion of historic buildings, large and small. Current restoration projects supported by the charity include Betchworth Castle.

== See also ==
- Society for the Protection of Ancient Buildings
- Surrey Archaeological Society
