= 2026 European Trampoline Championships =

2026 European Championships
- Venue: Portimão Arena
- Location: Portimão, Portugal
- Dates: 8 April to 12 April 2026
- Competitors: 211 from 25 nations (senior); 203 from 27 nations (junior); 50 from 20 nations (u21)

The 2026 European Championships in Trampoline, Double-Mini Trampoline and Tumbling (30th Seniors and 28th Juniors) commonly referred to as the 2026 European Trampoline Championships, was held from 8 April to 12 April 2026 in Portimão, Portugal.

== Participating nations ==
=== Senior ===
- Authorised Neutral Athletes 1 (8)
- Authorised Neutral Athletes 2 (25)
- Armenia (1)
- Austria (4)
- Azerbaijan (11)
- Belgium (7)
- Bulgaria (2)
- Czech Republic (6)
- Denmark (10)
- Spain (15)
- Estonia (2)
- France (16)
- Great Britain (16)
- Georgia (2)
- Germany (14)
- Greece (6)
- Ireland (2)
- Italy (4)
- Netherlands (12)
- Poland (2)
- Portugal (22) (Host)
- Slovenia (1)
- Sweden (2)
- Turkey (7)
- Ukraine (14)

== Events ==
=== Senior ===
Event	Gold	Silver	Bronze
Men
Individual Trampoline	Ivan Litvinovich (AIN)	Gabriel Albuquerque (POR)	Kirill Kozlov (AIN)
Synchro	Authorised Neutral Athletes; Stanislau Yaskevich; Ivan Melnikau	Germany; Fabian Vogel; Matthias Schuldt	Netherlands; Jordy Mol; Ralph Van Tilborg
Trampoline Team	Authorised Neutral Athletes; Ivan Litvinovich; Andrei Builou; Stanislau Yaskevich; Ivan Melnikau	Authorised Neutral Athletes; Roman Neudachin; Kirill Panteleev; Kirill Kozlov; Maksim Didenko	Portugal; Lucas Santos; Diogo Abreu; Gabriel Albuquerque; Pedro Ferreira
Double Mini	Omo Aikeremiokha (GBR)	Mikhail Iurev (AIN)	Timofei Golubenko (AIN)
Double Mini Team	Authorised Neutral Athletes; Lev Busarev; Aleksandr Butko; Mikhail Iurev; Timofei Golubenko	Great Britain; Ethan Cunningham; Omo Aikeremiokha; Lewis Gosling; Toby Williams	Portugal; Andre Dias; Francisco Jose; Tiago Teixeira; Diogo Cabral
Tumbling	Vasco Peso (POR)	Tofig Aliyev (AZE)	Magnus Lindholmer (DEN)
Tumbling Team	Denmark; Frederik Skaaning; Martin Abildgaard; Magnus Lindholmer; Marius Bundgaard	Azerbaijan; Mikhail Malkin; Tofig Aliyev; Adil Hajizada; Aleksey Karatashov	Portugal; Francisco Rodrigues; Joao Saraiva; Joao Azinheira; Vasco Peso
Women
Individual Trampoline	Anzhela Bladtceva (AIN)	Iana Lebedeva (AIN)	Sofia Aliaeva (AIN)
Synchro	Authorised Neutral Athletes; Zlata Miniakhmetava; Katsiaryna Yarshova	Portugal; Catarina Marianito Nunes; Sofia Correia	Spain; Noemi Romero Rosario; Erica Sanz
Trampoline Team	Authorised Neutral Athletes; Viyaleta Bardzilouskaya; Iana Lebedeva; Katsiaryna Yarshova; Zlata Miniakhmetava	Authorised Neutral Athletes; Sofia Aliaeva; Mariia Mikhailova; Anzhela Bladtceva; Alen Kalashnikova	France; Elina Rabouan Avisse; Léa Labrousse; Zelle Riou; Emma Le Jeune
Double Mini	Alena Kalashnikova (AIN)	Molly McKenna (GBR)	Kirsty Way (GBR)
Double Mini Team	Authorised Neutral Athletes; Alena Kalashnikova; Renata Usmanova; Galina Begim; Daria Tikhonova	Great Britain; Molly McKenna; Kim Beattie; Emily Lock; Kirsty Way	Portugal; Alexandra Garcia; Matilde Oliveira; Beatriz Mendes; Ines Reis
Tumbling	Lani Spiessens (BEL)	Alexandra Efraimoglou (GRE)	Jaeda-Lei Jeffers (GBR)
Tumbling Team	Authorised Neutral Athletes; Aleksandra Liamina; Elena Nieman; Mariia Savchenko; Arina Kaliandra	Belgium; Fran Renders; Marth Renders; Louise Van Regenmortel; Lani Spiessens	Great Britain; Jaeda-Lei Jeffers; Bella Hall-Cooper; Alisha Evanson; Natasha Exon

== Medals ==
Includes medals from Senior, Junior and U21.

* Host nation (Portugal)

Rank	Nation	Gold	Silver	Bronze	Total
1	Authorised Neutral Athletes 2	13	7	7	27
2	Authorised Neutral Athletes 1	9	3	2	14
3	Great Britain	3	8	4	15
4	Belgium	2	1	1	4
5	Portugal*	1	2	5	8
6	Spain	1	2	2	5
7	Georgia	1	1	1	3
8	Denmark	1	0	1	2
9	France	0	2	3	5
10	Azerbaijan	0	2	0	2
10	Greece	0	2	0	2
12	Germany	0	1	0	1
13	Bulgaria	0	0	2	2
13	Ukraine	0	0	2	2
15	Netherlands	0	0	1	1
Totals (15 entries)		31	31	31	93
