= Bella Hall-Cooper =

British trampoline gymnast

Sport
- Sport: Trampolining

Bella Hall-Cooper is a British athlete who competes in Tumbling gymnastics.

== Education ==
Hall-Cooper attended Harrow Way Community School.

== Sporting career ==
Hall-Cooper trains at the Andover Gymnastics Club. She competed at the 2022 Trampoline Gymnastics World Championships. She won a bronze medal at the 2025 British Championships. She won a silver medal in the 17-21 women’s tumbling at the 2025 Trampoline Gymnastics World Championships. She won a bronze medal at the 2026 European Trampoline Championships.

== Awards ==
European Championship
Year	Place	Medal	Type
2026	Portimão (Portugal)	Bronze	Tumbling Team
