= Diogo Abreu (gymnast) =

Portuguese trampoline gymnast (born 1993)

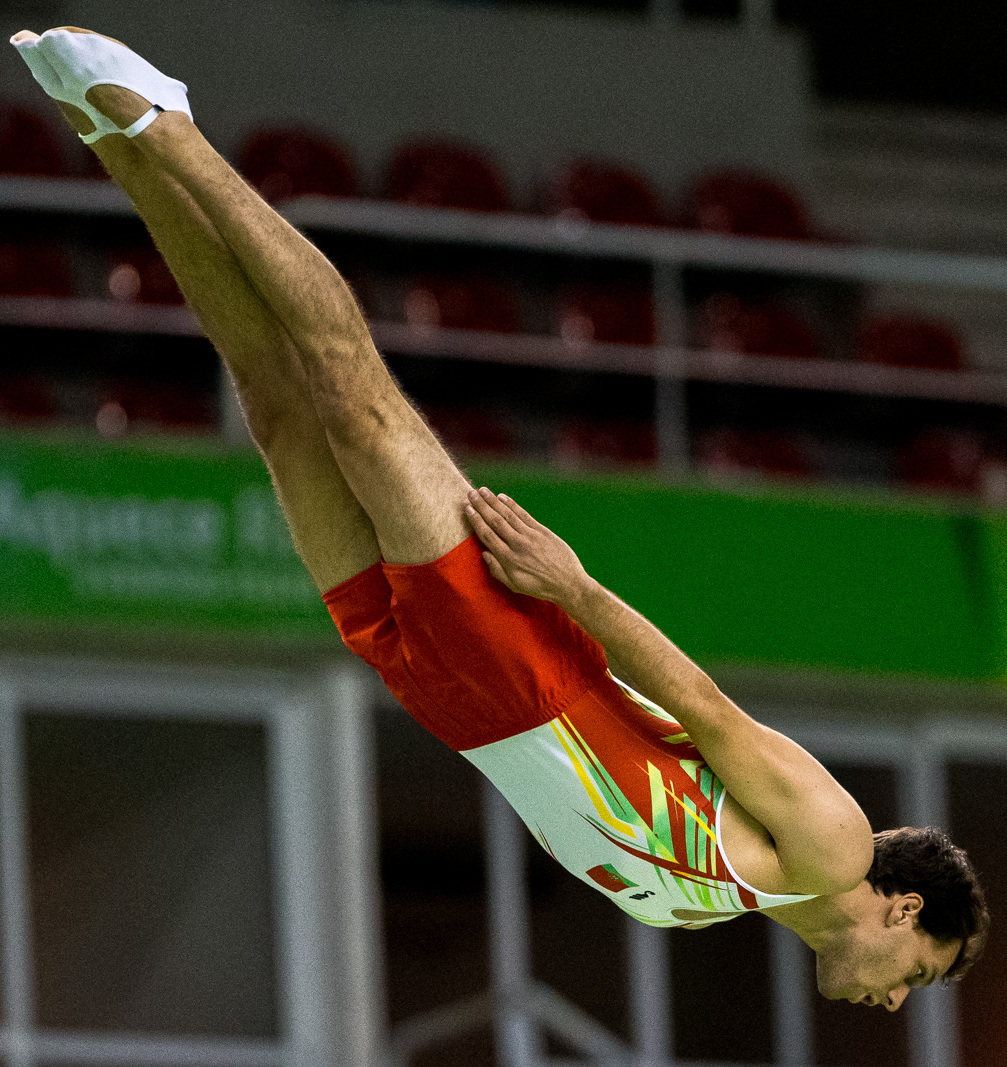
- Abreu competing at the 2016 Olympic Test Event

Personal information
- Full name: Diogo Ferreira Tribolet de Abreu
- Born: 5 September 1993 (age 33) Stanford, California, United States
- Height: 184 cm (6 ft 0 in)

Gymnastics career
- Discipline: Trampoline gymnastics
- Country represented: Portugal
- Club: Sporting CP
Medal record
Representing Portugal
World Championships
Gold medal – first place	2022 Sofia	Individual team
Silver medal – second place	2023 Birmingham	All-around team
Silver medal – second place	2022 Sofia	Synchro
Silver medal – second place	2018 St. Petersburg	All-around team
Bronze medal – third place	2022 Sofia	Team all-around
Bronze medal – third place	2025 Pamplona	Individual team
Bronze medal – third place	2026 Nanjing	All-around team
European Championships
Silver medal – second place	2022 Rimini	Synchro
Silver medal – second place	2022 Rimini	Team
Silver medal – second place	2021 Sochi	Individual team
Silver medal – second place	2014 Guimarães	Individual team
Bronze medal – third place	2016 Valladolid	Synchro
Bronze medal – third place	2016 Valladolid	Team
Bronze medal – third place	2024 Guimarães	Individual
Bronze medal – third place	2026 Portimão	Team
FIG World Cup
Event	1st	2nd	3rd
Individual	0	0	3
Synchro	0	2	5
Total	0	2	8

Diogo Ferreira Tribolet de Abreu (born 5 September 1993) is an American-born Portuguese trampoline gymnast. He represented Portugal at the 2016 and 2020 Summer Olympics. He is a 2022 World champion in the team event, where he also won a silver medal in the synchro event.

== Early life ==
Abreu was born in the United States and also lived in Canada before his family moved back to Portugal. He began gymnastics at eight years old because his mother was a rhythmic gymnast at the Sporting Clube de Portugal. He first competed in double mini trampoline and began competing in individual and synchro trampoline at 16 years old.

== Gymnastics career ==
Abreu secured a berth to the 2016 Summer Olympics by placing seventh at the 2016 Olympic Test Event. Before the Olympics, he competed at the 2016 European Championships and won a bronze medal in the synchro competition with Pedro Ferreira. He also won a bronze medal in the team event. At the 2016 Olympics, he finished 16th in the qualifications after failing to finish his second routine and did not advance into the final.

Abreu helped Portugal win the silver medal in the new team all-around event at the 2018 World Championships. He represented Portugal at the 2019 European Games and placed fourth in the synchro competition alongside Diogo Ganchinho.

At the 2021 European Championships, Abreu won a silver medal in the team event. He qualified to represent Portugal at the 2020 Summer Olympics due to his results on the 2019–21 Trampoline World Cup series. There, he finished 11th in the qualifications and did not advance into the final.

Abreu competed in syhcro with Pedro Ferreira at the 2022 European Championships, and they won the silver medal. Additionally, he helped Portugal win the team silver medal. Then at the 2022 World Championships, he led the Portuguese team to win the gold medal. He also won a silver medal in the synchro competition with Ferreira.

Abreu helped Portugal win the all-around team event at the 2023 World Championships. He won a bronze medal in the individual event at the 2024 European Championships, behind Ferreira and Pierre Gouzou.

Abreu won a bronze medal in the trampoline team event at the 2025 World Championships.

== Personal life ==
Abreu graduated with both a bachelor's degree and a master's degree from the Instituto Superior Técnico in electrical and computer engineering.
