= Jaeda-Lei Jeffers =

British trampoline gymnast (born 2007)

Personal information
- Born: 2007 (age 18–19) Birmingham, United Kingdom

Sport
- Sport: Trampolining

Jaeda-Lei Jeffers (born 2007) is a British athlete who competes in trampoline gymnastics.

== Personal life ==
Jeffers is from Birmingham.

== Sporting career ==
At the 2022 Trampoline Gymnastics World Championships she won a silver medal in the women's 15-16 tumbling final. In 2023, she became Women's Junior World Champion. She was a reserve gymnast at the 2024 European Trampoline Championships. Jeffers competed at the 2025 Trampoline Gymnastics World Championships where she won a silver medal. She won two bronze medals at the 2026 European Trampoline Championships.

== Awards ==
World Championship
| Year | Place | Medal | Event |
|---|---|---|---|
| 2025 | Pamplona (Spain) | Silver | Tumbling Team |
European Championship
| Year | Place | Medal | Type |
| 2026 | Portimão (Portugal) | Bronze | Tumbling |
| 2026 | Portimão (Portugal) | Bronze | Tumbling Team |
