= Tumbling (sport) =

Tumbling Gymnastics discipline

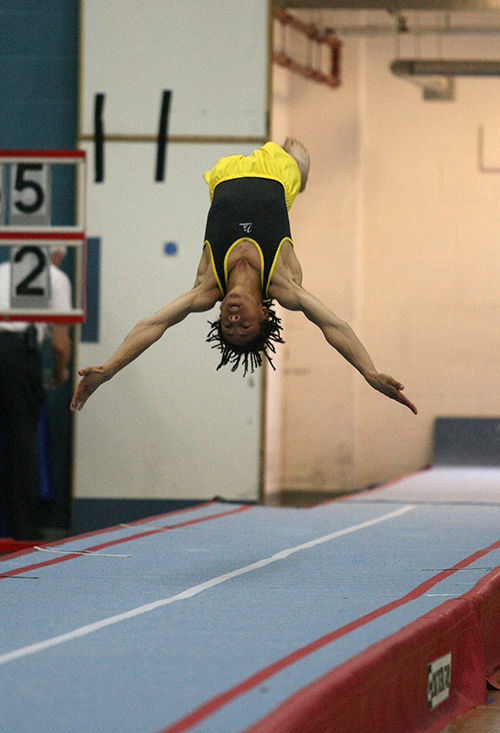
- Jordan Ramos in the British Tumbling Championships
- Highest governing body: World Gymnastics

Characteristics
- Team members: Individuals or teams of 3 or 4
- Mixed-sex: No
- Type: Gymnastic sport

Presence
- Country or region: Worldwide
- Olympic: 1932 only
- World Games: 1981 – present

Tumbling, sometimes referred to as power tumbling, is a gymnastics discipline in which participants perform a series of acrobatic skills down a 25.6 metres (84 ft) long rod floor or air track. Each series, known as a pass, comprises eight or five elements in which the athlete jumps, twists and flips placing only their hands and feet on the track. Tumblers are judged on the difficulty and form of their routine. There are both individual and team competitions in the sport.

Tumbling can also refer more generally to similar acrobatic skills performed on their own or in other gymnastics events, such as in floor exercises or on the balance beam.

Tumbling is governed by World Gymnastics, and is included as an event within trampoline gymnastics. Although tumbling is not currently an Olympic event, elite tumblers competing at the international level can compete in various events organised by the FIG, continental confederations as well as at the European Games and World Games.

== History ==
While the origins of tumbling are unknown, ancient records have shown acts of tumbling in many parts of the world including China, India, Japan, Egypt and Iran. Tumbling became part of the educational system of ancient Greece, from which early Romans borrowed the exercise for use in military training. During the Middle Ages, minstrels incorporated tumbling into their performances, and multiple records show tumblers performed for royal courts for entertainment. The 13th-century poem Our Lady's Tumbler depicts one such performer tumbling as an act of devotion. It is towards the end of this period in 1303 that the verb tumble is first attested in this sense in English. There was renewed interest in formalised physical education during the Renaissance, and shortly thereafter gymnastics began to be introduced into some physical education programmes, such as in Prussia as early as 1776. The FIG was officially formed in 1881, then known as the European Gymnastics Federation. Tumbling, however, was not governed by the FIG until 1999. Before this time, the International Trampoline Federation governed the sport since its founding in 1964. National federations have even longer histories, such as the Amateur Athletic Union of the United States which included tumbling in events as early as 1886.

Tumbling has only been included as an official event in one Olympic games, the 1932 Summer Olympics, and was exclusively a men's event. It was around this time that the floor exercise, which includes many elements of tumbling, became an individual event at the Olympics.

Tumbling has been an event at the World Games since the event's founding in 1980, first appearing at the 1981 World Games.

=== In the United States ===
The Amateur Athletic Union of the United States has included tumbling since 1886 and added women's tumbling in 1938.

The National Collegiate Athletic Association previously included tumbling as an event, but removed it in 1962 to emphasise artistic gymnastics. More recently in 2019 the NCAA recommended acrobatics and tumbling be added as a sport to the Emerging Sports for Women program, and this addition became official in the 2020–21 school year.

== FIG competitions ==
=== Equipment ===
The main piece of equipment used in tumbling is the tumbling track. The track is 25 metres (82 ft) long by 2 metres (6.6 ft) wide with a height of no more than 30 centimetres (12 in). The track is sprung and padded to assist the gymnasts during their pass. There are three lines running the length of the track. The middle line marks the centre of the track. The outer two mark the boundary of the track and are 150 centimetres (59 in) apart. Although part of the track extends beyond these lines, a pass is considered interrupted if a gymnast touches the track outside these lines.

Before the tumbling track, there is a run-up area on which the gymnasts can generate speed before beginning their pass. This run-up area measures 10 metres (33 ft) in length and should be the same height as the track itself.

At the end of the tumbling track there is a mat called the landing area. This mat is 6 metres (20 ft) long by 3 metres (9.8 ft) wide with a thickness of 30 centimetres (12 in). Within the landing area is a smaller landing zone, measuring 4 metres (13 ft) by 2 metres (6.6 ft), which is either filled in or outlined with a contrasting colour. Behind the landing area there must be an additional mat for safety, measuring at least 3 metres (9.8 ft) by 2 metres (6.6 ft).

If desired, the gymnast may use a vaulting board to begin their pass. This may be placed either on the tumbling track or the run-up.

=== Format ===
Tumbling competitions consist of two rounds. The first of these is a qualifying round for all participants, and the second is the final round for the top eight participants or teams. In the qualifying round, every participant performs two passes. In the final round, individual competitors perform an additional two passes while teams perform one pass per member. Each pass comprises eight elements. The first element of a pass may begin on the run-up but must land on the tumbling track. Passes are only allowed to move in the direction of the landing area, with the exception of the final element which may be performed in the opposite direction. A pass must have at least 3 elements to be scored and can be considered interrupted for a variety of reasons, such as the gymnast being out of bounds, the spotter touching the gymnast or a fall during the pass. All passes must end with a somersault, meaning the gymnast must flip at least once in the final skill.

In each round, a participant is not allowed to repeat the same element, with some exceptions. Some common moves with low point value are excluded from this rule. Elements can differ by the number of somersaults, twists or even the position of the gymnast's body. The same element may be repeated if it is preceded by a different element, and a skill with at least two somersaults and a twist may be repeated if the twist happens in a different phase of the skill. For instance, a double somersault with a twist may be repeated if the twist happens during the first somersault in one element and during the second somersault in the other.

Federations are allowed to add requirements to the passes in the qualifying round or even make a particular pass required. At FIG events special requirements are placed on the qualifying passes such that the first pass does not award any difficulty points for twists greater than a half-twist and the second does not award difficulty points for the final element if it does not include at least a full twist and deducts points for not including two somersault skills with at least a full twist each thereby focusing the first pass on somersaults and the second on twisting. As a result, these passes are respectively known as the salto pass and twisting pass.

=== Scoring ===
Tumbling passes are judged on two major components: difficulty and execution. Both are calculated to the tenth of a point. Scores are determined by a panel of eight judges. Two judges are responsible for the difficulty score. Five are responsible for the execution score. And one oversees the panel and handles miscellaneous or contested judging issues.

Difficulty judges are given competition cards before the gymnast performs this pass. These cards lay out the intended skills of the pass, and these judges are responsible for deducting points when the gymnast fails to perform the intended skills. Each skill has a pre-defined point value. Common connecting skills such as round-offs and handsprings have low difficulty values, and cartwheels have no value at all. Somersaults are given difficulty points based on how many flips and twists the gymnast performs and the position of their body during the skill.

Difficulty scores are consistent throughout all types of competitions with two exceptions. In youth competitions, skills have a maximum difficulty score of 4.3. In women's competitions, there is a 1.0-point bonus for each additional element with a difficulty value of at least 2.0 beyond the first.

Execution is scored based on each element's form, control, height and rhythm as well as the form and stability of the landing. Deductions are calculated independently by all five judges and taken from the maximum score of 10.0 points. The largest and smallest scores are ignored and the remaining scores are added together. At FIG events, this process of taking the middle three scores is done per element rather than per judge.

The gymnast's final score comes from adding the 3 execution scores and the difficulty score and subtracting any penalties incurred for things such as improper dress, improper procedure or an improper pass. Final scores are rounded to three decimal places.

=== Banned skills ===
In youth competitions, quadruple somersaults are banned. Performing this skill will result in the gymnast being disqualified from the competition.

== Tumbling skills ==
Common types of skills in tumbling
Skill	Explained
Round-off	A common entry skill seen in every type of gymnastics to turn horizontal speed into vertical speed.
End skill	The skill competed at the end of the run; this is either a double/triple somersault, a twisting somersault or a combination somersault.
Flick	A long somersault where a gymnast moves from feet to hands to feet again in a backwards motion.
Whip	A long, low and fast somersault done without the hands. This move is unique to tumbling and the trademark of the discipline.
Double somersault	The tumbler launches into the air and rotates twice vertically around before landing on their feet. This skill is done in a tuck, pike or straight position.
Triple somersault	The gymnast launches into the air and rotates three times vertically before landing on their feet. This skill is done in a tuck or pike position.
Twisting somersault	A single somersault in which the tumbler rotates horizontally. This can be done as a single 'full' twist, a double twist or a triple twist.
Combination somersault	A somersault that is a combination of double/triple and twisting skills. For example, in a double-twisting double straight, the gymnast will rotate twice vertically and twice horizontally before landing.
Transition skill	A double somersault or a combination somersault in the middle of a run as opposed to an end skill.

== FIG World Championship results ==
=== Men's individual ===
Year	Location	Gold		Silver		Bronze	
2007	Quebec City	Andrey Krylov (RUS)	79.200	Huanian Pan (CHN)	77.200	Sergei Artemenko (BLR)	74.900
2009	Saint Petersburg	Tagir Murtazaev (RUS)	77.300	Song Yang (CHN)	75.000	Mikhail Kostyanov (RUS)	73.900
2010	Metz	Viktor Kyforenko (UKR)	76.300	Song Yang (CHN)	75.400	Andrey Krylov (RUS)	74.600
2011	Birmingham	Song Yang (CHN)	79.100	Luo Zhang (CHN)	76.500	Andrey Krylov (RUS)	75.800
2013	Sofia	Kristof Willerton (GBR)	74.900	Tagir Murtazaev (RUS)	74.800	Grigory Noskov (RUS)	74.200
2014	Daytona Beach	Song Yang (CHN)	78.800	Alexander Mironov (RUS)	77.000	Tagir Murtazaev (RUS)	75.000
2015	Odense	Song Yang (CHN)	79.100	Timofei Podust (RUS)	78.300	Kuo Zhang (CHN)	77.700
2017	Sofia	Kuo Zhang (CHN)	76.800	Anders Wesch (DEN)	75.500	Elliott Browne (GBR)	75.500
2018	Saint Petersburg	Vadim Afanasev (RUS)	79.200	Elliott Browne (GBR)	77.900	Kuo Zhang (CHN)	77.700
2019	Tokyo	Aleksandr Lisitsyn (RUS)	78.700	Elliott Browne (GBR)	77.200	Kaden Brown (USA)	76.300
2021	Baku	Aleksandr Lisitsyn (RUS)	80.000	Mikhail Malkin (AZE)	76.300	Kaden Brown (USA)	75.400
2022	Sofia	Ethan McGuinness (AUS)	28.900	Kristof Willerton (GBR)	28.300	Axel Duriez (FRA)	27.400
2023	Birmingham	Mikhail Malkin (AZE)	31.100	Kaden Brown (USA)	30.100	Jaydon Paddock (GBR)	27.800

All results correct according to FIG database. Records only available from 2007.

=== Women's individual ===
Year	Location	Gold		Silver		Bronze	
2007	Quebec City	Anna Korobeinikova (RUS)	70.700	Olena Chabanenko (UKR)	68.200	Anastasiia Isupova (RUS)	67.700
2009	Saint Petersburg	Anna Korobeinikova (RUS)	69.400	Elena Krasnokutckaia (RUS)	66.900	Ashley Speed (CAN)	62.800
2010	Metz	Anna Korobeinikova (RUS)	68.200	Elena Krasnokutckaia (RUS)	65.500	Marine Debauve (FRA)	63.400
2011	Birmingham	Jia Fangfang (CHN)	71.700	Anna Korobeinikova (RUS)	70.900	Elena Krasnokutckaia (RUS)	68.400
2013	Sofia	Jia Fangfang (CHN)	70.700	Lucie Colebeck (GBR)	67.400	Lingxi Chen (CHN)	67.000
2014	Daytona Beach	Rachel Letsche (GBR)	67.500	Lingxi Chen (CHN)	67.300	Raquel Pinto (POR)	66.100
2015	Odense	Jia Fangfang (CHN)	71.800	Lucie Colebeck (GBR)	69.100	Lingxi Chen (CHN)	67.900
2017	Sofia	Jia Fangfang (CHN)	72.300	Anna Korobeinikova (RUS)	72.100	Lucie Colebeck (GBR)	71.500
2018	Saint Petersburg	Jia Fangfang (CHN)	71.100	Shanice Davidson (GBR)	69.500	Viktoriia Danilenko (RUS)	69.500
2019	Tokyo	Viktoriia Danilenko (RUS)	69.900	Shanice Davidson (GBR)	69.600	Megan Kealy (GBR)	69.000
2021	Baku	Megan Kealy (GBR)	67.800	Lucie Tumoine (FRA)	66.800	Tachina Peeters (BEL)	66.500
2022	Sofia	Comfort Yeates (GBR)	24.400	Koralee Catlett (AUS)	24.200	Shanice Davidson (GBR)	24.100
2023	Birmingham	Candy Briere-Vetillard (FRA)	26.000	Megan Kealy (GBR)	25.800	Saskia Servini (GBR)	25.300

All results correct according to FIG database. Records only available from 2007.

== FIT-era world champions ==
=== Men ===
Year	Gymnast	Country
1976	Jim Bertz	United States
1978	Jim Bertz	United States
1980	Ken Ekberg	United States
1982	Steve Elliott	United States
1984	Steve Elliott	United States
1986	Jerry Hardy	United States
1988	Pascal Eouzan	France
1990	Pascal Eouzan	France
1992	Jon Beck	United States
1994	Adrian Sienkiewicz	Poland
1996	Rayshine Harris	United States
1998	Levon Petrosian	Russia

=== Women ===
Year	Gymnast	Country
1976	Tracy Long	United States
1978	Nancy Quattrochi	United States
1980	Tracy Conour	United States
1982	Jill Hollembeak	United States
1984	Jill Hollembeak	United States
1986	Jill Hollembeak	United States
1988	Megan Cunningham	United States
1990	Chrystel Robert	France
1992	Chrystel Robert	France
1994	Chrystel Robert	France
1996	Chrystel Robert	France
1998	Elena Bluyina	Russia

== World Games results ==
=== Men ===
Games	Gold	Silver	Bronze
1981 Santa Clara	United States; Steve Elliott	United States; Randy Wickstrom	United States; Steve Cooper
1985 London	United States; Steve Elliott	United States; Chad Fox	France; Didier Semmola
1989 Karlsruhe	United States; Jon Beck	France; Pascal Eouzan	France; Christophe Lambert
1993 The Hague	United States; Jon Beck	United States; Rayshine Harris	Russia; Aleksey Kryzhanovskiy
1997 Lahti	Russia; Vladimir Ignatenkov	United States; Rayshine Harris	South Africa; Tseko Mogotsi
2001 Akita	Russia; Levon Petrosian	South Africa; Tseko Mogotsi	United Kingdom; Robert Small
2005 Duisburg	Poland; Jozef Wadecki	Belarus; Andrey Kabishev	Russia; Aleksandr Skorodumov
2009 Kaohsiung	Russia; Andrey Krylov	United Kingdom; Michael Barnes	Ukraine; Viktor Kyforenko
2013 Cali	China; Zhang Luo; Ukraine; Viktor Kyforenko	None awarded	United Kingdom; Kristof Willerton
2017 Wroclaw	China; Zhang Luo	United States; Austin Nacey	Russia; Maxim Shlyakin
2022 Birmingham	Kaden Brown; United States	Axel Duriez; France	Rasmus Steffensen; Denmark

=== Women ===
Games	Gold	Silver	Bronze
1981 Santa Clara	United States; Angie Whiting	United States; Kristi Laman	United States; Stacey Hansen
1985 London	France; Isabelle Jagueux	United States; Megan Cunningham	Canada; Maria Constantinitis
1989 Karlsruhe	France; Chrystel Robert	United States; Michelle Mara	United States; Melanie Bugg
1993 The Hague	France; Chrystel Robert	Belarus; Tatyana Morosova	United States; Michelle Mara
1997 Lahti	Ukraine; Olena Chabanenko	France; Chrystel Robert	Russia; Natalya Borisenko
2001 Akita	Russia; Elena Bluyina	United Kingdom; Kathryn Peberdy	Belarus; Anna Terenya
2005 Duisburg	Ukraine; Olena Chabanenko	Russia; Anna Korobeynikova	United States; Yuliya Hall
2009 Kaohsiung	Russia; Anna Korobeynikova	Russia; Anzhelika Soldatkina	Canada; Emily Smith
2013 Cali	China; Jia Fangfang	United Kingdom; Rachael Letsche	Canada; Emily Smith
2017 Wrocław	China; Jia Fangfang	Russia; Anna Korobeinikova	United Kingdom; Lucie Colebeck
2022 Birmingham	Candy Brière-Vetillard; France	Miah Bruns; United States	Breanah Cauchi; Australia

== Other notable tumblers ==
Person	Country
Ed Gross	United States
William Herrmann	United States
Rowland Wolfe	United States
Judy Wills Cline	United States
Surya Bonaly	France

== See also ==
- Men's tumbling at the 1932 Summer Olympics
