= Arina Kaliandra =

Russian gymnast (born 2006)

Personal information
- Native name: Арина Каляндра
- Born: 3 June 2006 (age 20) Stavropol, Russia

Sport
- Sport: Trampolining

Arina Kaliandra (Russian: Арина Каляндра; born 3 June 2006) is a Russian athlete who competes in trampoline gymnastics.

== Sporting career ==
In 2021 she won a gold medal in tumbling at the FIG World Age Group Competitions in Baku. In 2025 she won a gold medal in the tumbling world championships. She competed as an Individual Neutral Athlete.

== Awards ==
European Trampoline Championships
| Year | Place | Medal | Event |
|---|---|---|---|
| 2026 | Portimão (Portugal) | Gold | Tumbling Team |
European Trampoline Championships (junior)
| Year | Place | Medal | Event |
| 2021 | Sochi (Russia) | Gold | Tumbling |
| 2021 | Sochi (Russia) | Gold | Tumbling Team |
World Championship
| Year | Place | Medal | Event |
| 2025 | Pamplona (Spain) | Gold | Tumbling |
| 2026 | Nanjing (China) | Gold | Tumbling Team |
