= Comfort Yeates =

British gymnast (born 2005)

Personal information
- Born: 2005 (age 20–21) Chichester, United Kingdom

Sport
- Sport: Trampolining

Comfort Yeates (born 2005) is a British athlete who competes in trampoline gymnastics. She trains at the Salto Centre in Andover.

== Education ==
Yeates was a student at Havant College.

== Awards ==
World Championship
Year	Place	Medal	Proof
2022	Sofia (Bulgaria)	Gold	Tumbling Team
European Championship
Year	Place	Medal	Type
2024	Guimarães (Portugal)	Gold	Tumbling Team
