= 2026 Trampoline Gymnastics World Championships =

International gymnastics competition

2026 Trampoline World Championships
- Location: Nanjing, China
- Start date: 5 November 2026
- End date: 8 November 2026

The 39th World Trampoline Gymnastics Championships was held in Nanjing , China, from 5 to 8 November 2026, organized by the International Gymnastics Federation (FIG) and the Chinese Gymnastics Federation.

The competition was held at the Yangtze River International Conference Center in the Chinese city of Nanjing.

== Medals ==
Event	Gold	Silver	Bronze
Men
Individual	Ivan Litvinovich (BLR)	Wang Zisai (CHN)	Yan Langyu (CHN)
Individual team	Belarus; Stanislau Yaskevich; Ivan Litvinovich; Andrei Builou; Ivan Melnikau	China; Lin Zhenyu; Wang Zisai; Yan Langyu; Li Yuming	Russia; Kirill Panteleev; Kirill Kozlov; Dmitrii Nartov; Danila Kasimov
Synchro	Russia; Dimitrii Natrov; Kirill Panteleev	Great Britain; Corey Walkes; Zak Perzamanos	Belarus; Ivan Litvinovich; Ivan Melnikau
Double mini	West Fowler (USA)	Ilia Penkin (RUS)	Aleksandr Butko (RUS)
Double mini team	Russia; Aleksandr Butko; Ilia Penkin; Damian Kozmin; Timofei Golubenko	Portugal; Diogo Cabral; Francisco José; Diogo Fernandes; André Dias	United States; Trevor Harder; West Fowler; Ruben Padilla; Rafael Pikofsky-Christiansen
Tumbling	Vasco Peso (POR)	Tofig Aliyev (AZE)	Kaden Brown (USA)
Tumbling team	Azerbaijan; Tofig Aliyev; Mikhail Malkin; Adil Hajizada; Aleksey Karatashov	Denmark; Frederik Skaaning; Marius Bundgaard; Magnus Lindholmer; Martin Abildgaard	United States; Kaden Brown; Kaleb Cave; West Fowler; Xavier Harper
Women
Individual	Zhu Xueying (CHN)	Viyaleta Bardzilouskaya (BLR)	Kiko Tanaka (JPN)
Individual team	China; Yu Zhang; Zhu Xueying; Zhang Xinxin; Qiu Zheng	Russia; Anzhela Bladtceva; Anna Kornetskaia; Mariia Mikhailova; Anzhelika Alysheva	Belarus; Iana Lebedeva; Katsiaryna Yarshova; Viyaleta Bardzilouskaya; Zlata Miniakhmetava
Synchro	Russia; Anzhela Bladtceva; Mariia Mikhailova	Great Britain; Bryony Page; Isabelle Songhurst	China; Hu Keying; Cao Yunzhu
Double mini	Galina Begim (RUS)	Bronwyn Dibb (NZL)	Susan Gill (USA)
Double mini team	United States; Aliah Raga; Susan Gill; Grace Harder; Clara McNew	Russia; Galina Begim; Alena Kalashnikova; Daria Tikhonova; Evgeniia Zakharova	Great Britain; Kim Beattie; Emily Lock; Molly McKenna; Kirsty Way
Tumbling	Alexandra Efraimoglou (GRE)	Arina Kaliandra (RUS)	Maëlle Dumitru-Marin (FRA)
Tumbling team	Russia; Aleksandra Liamina; Elena Neiman; Arina Kaliandra; Polina Novolokina	Belgium; Fran Renders; Louise Van Regenmortel; Lani Spiessens; Marth Renders	France; Manon Morancais; Maëlle Dumitru-Marin; Pauline Tonnellier; Camille Berdal
Mixed
Synchro	Belarus; Katsiaryna Yarshova; Stanislau Yaskevich	Azerbaijan; Seljan Mahsudova; Magsud Mahsudov	Japan; Hikaru Mori; Yusei Matsumoto
All-around team	Russia; Galina Begim; Matvei Belov; Anzhela Bladtceva; Aleksandr Butko; Arina Kaliandra; Kirill Kozlov; Mariia Mikhailova; Dimitrii Natrov; Kirill Panteleev	China; Feng Baoyi; Huang Honglin; Jia Fangfang; Wang Zisai; Yang Jinyi; Zhang Xinxin; Zhang Yu; Zhao Jiahui; Zhou Chaoyue	Portugal; Diogo Abreu; Gabriel Albuquerque; Diogo Cabral; Sofia Correia; Salome Ferraz; Pedro Ferreira; Alexandra Garcia; Catarina Marianito Nunes; Vasco Peso

== Medal table ==
A banner of the Championship near the venue

* Host nation (China)

Rank	Nation	Gold	Silver	Bronze	Total
1	Russia	6	4	2	12
2	Belarus	3	1	2	6
3	China*	2	3	2	7
4	United States	2	0	4	6
5	Azerbaijan	1	2	0	3
6	Portugal	1	1	1	3
7	Greece	1	0	0	1
8	Great Britain	0	2	1	3
9	Belgium	0	1	0	1
9	Denmark	0	1	0	1
9	New Zealand	0	1	0	1
12	France	0	0	2	2
12	Japan	0	0	2	2
Totals (13 entries)		16	16	16	48
