= Alisha Evanson =

British trampoline gymnast (born 2002)

Personal information
- Born: 2002 (age 23–24) United Kingdom
- Education: University of Chester

Sport
- Sport: Trampolining

Alisha Evanson (born 2002) is a British athlete who competes in trampoline gymnastics.

== Personal life ==
Evanson has a degree in fashion design from the University of Chester.

== Sporting career ==
Evanson trains with Cheshire Gymnastics. In 2023, she competed at the World Age Group Championships in Birmingham. In 2023, she competed at the British Championships and qualified for the world championships. In 2024, she won a Loulé Cup medal. Evanson competed at the 2025 Trampoline Gymnastics World Championships.

== Awards ==
World Championship
Year	Place	Medal	Event
2025	Pamplona (Spain)	Silver	Tumbling Team
European Championship
Year	Place	Medal	Type
2026	Portimão (Portugal)	Bronze	Tumbling Team
