= Bilal Gurbanov =

Azerbaijani gymnast (born 2006)

Personal information
- Born: 2006 (age 19–20) Azerbaijan

Sport
- Sport: Trampolining
Medal record
Men's trampoline gymnastics
Representing Azerbaijan
World Championships
Gold medal – first place	2025 Pamplona	Tumbling team

Bilal Gurbanov (born 2006) is an Azerbaijani athlete who competes in trampoline gymnastics.

== Awards ==
European Championship
Year	Place	Medal	Type
2021	Sochi (Russia)	Bronze	Tumbling Team (junior)
2024	Guimarães (Portugal)	Silver	Tumbling
