= Galina Begim =

Russian gymnast (born 2002)

Personal information
- Born: 2002 (age 23–24) Yakutsk, Russia

Sport
- Sport: Trampolining

Galina Begim (born 2002) is a Russian athlete who competes in trampoline gymnastics.

== Sporting career ==
In 2021 she won a gold medal in tumbling at the junior championships in Baku. In 2025 she won a silver medal in the world championships. She competed as an Individual Neutral Athlete. She competed at the 2026 European Trampoline Championships.

== Awards ==
European Trampoline Championships
Year	Place	Medal	Event
2021	Sochi (Russia)	Gold	Double Mini
2026	Portimão (Portugal)	Gold	Double Mini Team
European Trampoline Championships (junior)
Year	Place	Medal	Event
2021	Baku (Azerbaijan)	Gold	Double Mini Team
World Championship
Year	Place	Medal	Event
2019	Tokyo (Japan)	Bronze	Double Mini Team
2025	Pamplona (Spain)	Silver	Double mini
2025	Pamplona (Spain)	Silver	All-around team
2026	Nanjing (China)	Silver	Double Mini Team
