= Iana Lebedeva =

Russian trampoline gymnast

- Full name: Iana Andreevna Lebedeva
- Alternative name: Yana Lebedeva
- Born: 19 December 2001 (age 24) Saint Petersburg, Russia
- Height: 1.62 m (5 ft 4 in)

Gymnastics career
- Discipline: Trampoline gymnastics
- Country represented: Belarus Authorised Neutral Athletes
- Former countries represented: Russia
- Club: Admiralteysky District Sports School of Olympic Reserve No.1
- Head coach: Natalia Lebedeva
Medal record
Representing Belarus and Authorised Neutral Athletes
World Championships
Silver medal – second place	2025 Pamplona	Individual team
Bronze medal – third place	2026 Nanjing	Individual team
Representing Russia and RGF
World Championships
Gold medal – first place	2021 Baku	All-around team
Bronze medal – third place	2021 Baku	Individual team
Bronze medal – third place	2021 Baku	Individual
European Championships
Gold medal – first place	2021 Sochi	Individual
Gold medal – first place	2021 Sochi	Team

Iana Andreevna Lebedeva (Russian: Яна Андреевна Лебедева; born 19 December 2001) is a Russian trampoline gymnast. She is the 2021 European champion and 2021 World bronze medalist in the individual event. She represented the Russian Olympic Committee at the 2020 Olympics and finished 11th during the qualification round of the trampoline competition.

== Gymnastics career ==
Lebedeva originally trained in acrobatic gymnastics but switched to trampoline at nine years old. Her mother, Natalia, is her coach. At the 2015 World Age Group Competition, she won a silver medal in the 15-16 synchro event.

=== 2018–2021 ===
Lebedeva won a gold medal with the junior Russian trampoline team at the 2018 European Championships. There, she also won a silver medal in the synchro event. She finished fourth in the synchro event at the 2018 Loulé World Cup with partner Susana Kochesok.

Lebedeva won the individual title at the 2021 European Championships, and she helped Russia win the team title. At the 2021 Anadia World Cup, she won the individual silver medal behind teammate Kochesok. She then competed at the delayed-2020 Summer Olympics and finished 11th in the qualification round. She then won the bronze medal in the individual event at the 2021 World Championships behind Bryony Page and Cao Yunzhu. She also helped the Russian Gymnastics Federation win the all-around team title.

=== 2022–2024 ===
In February 2022, Lebedeva qualified first for the final at the Baku World Cup but fell to last place in the final. The next month, the International Gymnastics Federation (FIG) banned Russian and Belarusian athletes due to the Russian invasion of Ukraine. She continued to participate in domestic competitions. In the summer of 2023, the FIG announced it would lift the ban beginning in January 2024.

Lebedeva returned to international competition in 2024 and won the bronze medal at the Baku World Cup. She won another bronze medal at the 2024 Cottbus World Cup. She earned enough points in the 2024 World Cup series to qualify for the 2024 Summer Olympics. However, she was not approved by the International Olympic Committee to compete as an Individual Neutral Athlete.

=== 2025 ===
In February 2025, Lebedeva announced she was taking a break from the sport. Later that year, she changed her nationality to begin representing Belarus and was approved by the International Gymnastics Federation to compete as an Authorised Neutral Athlete. At the 2025 World Championships, she won a silver medal with the Individual Neutral Athletes from Belarus in the team competition.

== See also ==
- Nationality changes in gymnastics
