= Kim Beattie =

British trampoline gymnast (born 1998)

Personal information
- Born: 1998 (age 27–28) Aberdeen, Scotland, United Kingdom
- Education: University of Aberdeen

Sport
- Sport: Trampolining

Kim Beattie (born 1998) is a British athlete who competes in trampoline gymnastics.

== Personal life ==
Beattie is from the town of Banchory in Aberdeenshire. Beattie studied Electrical and Electronic Engineering at the University of Aberdeen. She works as a control systems engineer. She is a member of the Banchory Trampoline & DMT Club.

In 2023, Beattie competed at the DMT World Championships. In the 2025 Trampoline Gymnastics World Championships in Pamplona, she won a silver team medal in double mini-trampoline alongside Molly McKenna, Kirsty Way and Emily Lock. In February 2026, she was awarded MT Athlete of the Year.

== Awards ==
World Championship
| Year | Place | Medal | Event |
|---|---|---|---|
| 2017 | Sofia (Bulgaria) | Silver | Double Mini Team |
| 2019 | Tokyo (Japan) | Silver | Double Mini Team |
| 2022 | Sofia (Bulgaria) | Bronze | Double Mini Team |
| 2025 | Pamplona (Spain) | Silver | Double Mini Team |
| 2026 | Nanjing (China) | Bronze | Double Mini Team |
European Championship
| Year | Place | Medal | Type |
| 2022 | Rimini (Italy) | Gold | Double Mini Team |
