= Isabelle Songhurst =

British trampoline gymnast (born 1999)

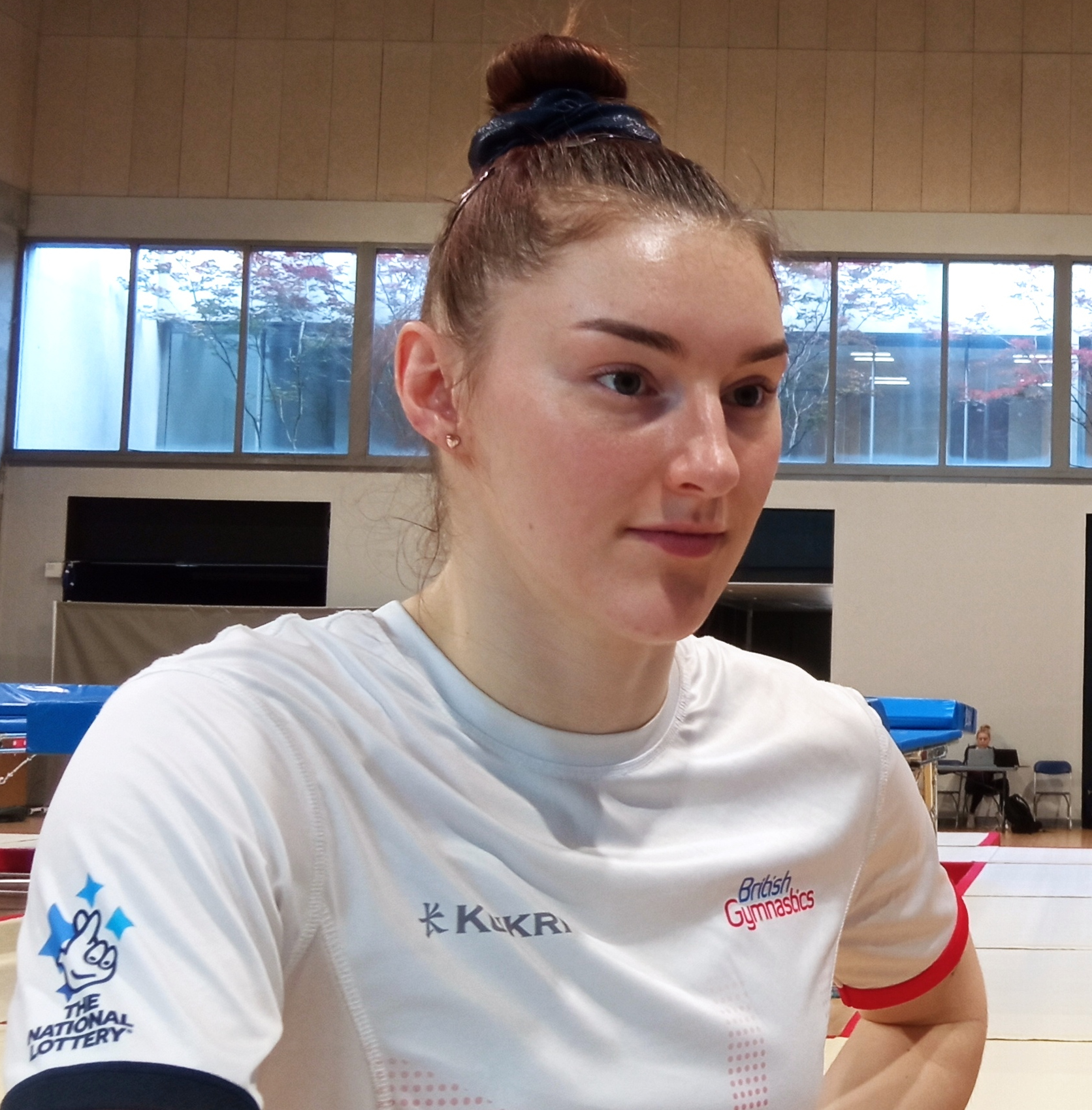
- Songhurst in 2024

Personal information
- Nickname: Izzy
- Born: 16 January 1999 (age 27) Poole, Dorset, England
- Height: 170 cm (5 ft 7 in)

Gymnastics career
- Discipline: Trampoline gymnastics
- Country represented: Great Britain
- Club: Poole Gymnastics and Trampolining Club
- Head coach: Brian Camp
Medal record
Women's trampoline gymnastics
Representing Great Britain
World Championships
Gold medal – first place	2022 Sofia	All-around team
Silver medal – second place	2019 Tokyo	Individual team
Silver medal – second place	2022 Sofia	Individual team
Silver medal – second place	2025 Pamplona	Synchro
Silver medal – second place	2026 Nanjing	Synchro
Bronze medal – third place	2017 Sofia	Individual team
Bronze medal – third place	2023 Birmingham	Synchronized
Bronze medal – third place	2023 Birmingham	All-around team
Bronze medal – third place	2025 Pamplona	All-around team
European Championships
Gold medal – first place	2022 Rimini	Synchronized
Gold medal – first place	2024 Guimarães	Synchronized

Isabelle "Izzy" Songhurst (born 16 January 1999) is a British trampoline gymnast. She is an eight-time medalist at the World Championships, including a gold medalist in the all-around team event. With Bryony Page, she is a two-time European champion (2022, 2024) and the 2023 World bronze medalist in synchronized trampoline. She represented Great Britain at the 2024 Summer Olympics, finishing 14th in the qualification round.

== Gymnastics career ==
Songhurst began trampoline gymnastics when she was two years old because her mother was a coach. Her younger sister Maddy has also competed internationally in the sport.

=== Junior ===
Songhurst competed at the 2013 World Age Group Competition, finishing seventh as an individual and fourth in the synchro event among the 13-14 age group. She then won an individual silver medal at the 2015 World Age Group Competition by 0.070 points behind Japan's Hikaru Mori.

=== Senior ===
Songhurst competed at her first senior-level World Championships in 2017 and won a bronze medal in the team event alongside Laura Gallagher and Kat Driscoll. She dislocated her ankle the day before the 2018 European Championships and had surgery in Baku. At the 2019 World Championships, she won a silver medal in the team event with Gallagher, Driscoll, and Bryony Page.

At the 2022 European Championships, Songhurst and Page won the synchro title. She also won the individual title at the 2022 British Championships. Then at the 2022 World Championships, Songhurst, Page, and Louise Brownsey won a silver medal in the trampoline team event, behind China. She also won a gold medal in the all-around team event, and she finished eighth in the synchro final with Page.

Songhurst successfully defended her individual title at the 2023 British Championships. Songhurst and Page won the synchro event at the 2023 Varna World Cup after finishing fourth at the Palm Beach World Cup. At the 2023 World Championships, she placed seventh in the individual event and won a bronze medal in the synchro event with Page. Her individual result ensured a second berth for Great Britain at the 2024 Summer Olympics. Additionally, she won a bronze medal in the all-around team event.

Songhurst and Page won the synchro title at the 2024 European Championships, where she also placed seventh in the individual final. She was selected to compete at the 2024 Summer Olympics and finished 14th, meaning she did not advance to the final.

At the 2025 World Championships, Songhurst and Page won the synchro silver medal. Additionally, she helped Great Britain win the bronze medal in the all-around team event.
