= Marta Lopez (gymnast) =

Spanish trampoline gymnast (born 2006)

Personal information
- Born: 2006 (age 19–20) Basauri, Spain

Sport
- Sport: Trampolining
Medal record
Women's Trampoline gymnastics
Representing Spain
World Championships
Bronze medal – third place	2025 Pamplona	Double Mini Team

Marta Lopez (born 2006) is a Spanish athlete who competes in trampoline gymnastics. She won a bronze medal at the 2024 European Trampoline Championships.

== Awards ==
European Championship
Year	Place	Medal	Type
2024	Guimarães (Portugal)	Bronze	Equipment
