= Marine Jurbert =

French trampoline gymnast

- Full name: Marine Marlene Christelle Jurbert
- Born: 11 December 1992 (age 33)

Gymnastics career
- Discipline: Trampoline gymnastics
- Country represented: France; (2009-)
- Club: Levallois Sporting Club / Pole France de Rennes
- Head coaches: Valérie Chapon (personal); Guillaume Bourgeon (national team)
Medal record
Women's trampoline gymnastics
Representing France
World Championships
Silver medal – second place	2022 Sofia	Synchro
European Championships
Gold medal – first place	2016 Valladolid	Synchro
Silver medal – second place	2024 Guimarães	Synchro
Bronze medal – third place	2008 Odense	Synchro
Bronze medal – third place	2010 Varna	Trampoline Team
Bronze medal – third place	2014 Guimarães	Synchro
Bronze medal – third place	2021 Sotchi	Trampoline Team
Bronze medal – third place	2021 Sotchi	Individual
European Games
Silver medal – second place	2015 Baku	Synchro

Marine Marlene Christelle Jurbert (born 11 December 1992) is a French individual and synchronised trampolinist, representing her nation at international competitions.

== Career ==
She took up gymnastics at age four. She made her senior international debut for the French team in 2014 and trains 25 hours per week. She competed at world championships, including at the 2009, 2010, 2011, 2013, 2014 and 2015 Trampoline World Championships. At the 2015 European Games in Baku she won the silver medal in the synchronized event with Joëlle Vallez.

Jurbert competed for France at the 2016 Summer Olympics.

== Personal ==
She lives in Rennes, France.
