= Martin Abildgaard =

Danish gymnast

Personal information
- Born: 2002 (age 23–24)

Sport
- Sport: Trampolining
Medal record
Men's trampoline gymnastics
Representing Denmark
World Championships
Silver medal – second place	2026 Nanjing	Tumbling team

Martin Abildgaard (born 2002) is a Danish athlete who competes in trampoline gymnastics.

== Career ==
Abildgaard competed at the 2025 World Games in China. He most recently competed at the 2026 European Trampoline Championships.

== Awards ==
World Championship
Year	Place	Medal	Type
2021	Baku (Azerbaijan)	Bronze	Tumbling Team
2022	Sofía (Bulgaria)	Silver	Tumbling Team
2023	Birmingham (United Kingdom)	Bronze	Tumbling Team
2025	Pamplona (Spain)	Bronze	Tumbling
2025	Pamplona (Spain)	Bronze	Tumbling Team
European Championship
Year	Place	Medal	Type
2021	Sochi (Russia)	Silver	Tumbling Team
2022	Rímini (Italy)	Silver	Tumbling Team
2026	Portimão (Portugal)	Gold	Tumbling Team
