= Magnus Lindholmer =

Danish trampoline gymnast (born 2003)

Personal information
- Born: 2003 (age 22–23) Langeland, Denmark

Sport
- Sport: Trampolining
Medal record
Men's trampoline gymnastics
Representing Denmark
World Championships
| Silver medal – second place | 2025 Pamplona | Tumbling |
| Silver medal – second place | 2026 Nanjing | Tumbling team |
| Bronze medal – third place | 2025 Pamplona | Tumbling team |

Magnus Lindholmer (born 2003) is a Danish athlete who competes in trampoline gymnastics.

He has won medals at the Trampoline Gymnastics World Championships and at the European Trampoline Championships.

== Awards ==
World Championship
| Year | Place | Medal | Type |
|---|---|---|---|
| 2022 | Sofia (Bulgaria) | Silver | Tumbling Team |
| 2023 | Birmingham (UK) | Bronze | Tumbling Team |
European Championship
| Year | Place | Medal | Type |
| 2021 | Sochi (Russia) | Silver | Tumbling Team |
| 2024 | Guimarães (Portugal) | Gold | Tumbling |
