= Matthias Schuldt =

German trampoline gymnast (born 2000)

Personal information
- Born: 5 February 2000 (age 25); Aschaffenburg, Bavaria, Germany

Sport
- Sport: Trampolining

Matthias Schuldt (born 5 February 2000) is a German athlete who competes in trampoline gymnastics.

He won a bronze medal at the 2022 Trampoline Gymnastics World Championships and a silver medal at the 2024 European Trampoline Championships.

== Awards ==
World Championship
Year	Place	Medal	Type
2022	Sofía (Bulgaria)	Bronze	Equipment
European Championship
Year	Place	Medal	Type
2024	Guimarães (Portugal)	Silver	Equipment
