= West Fowler =

American trampoline gymnast

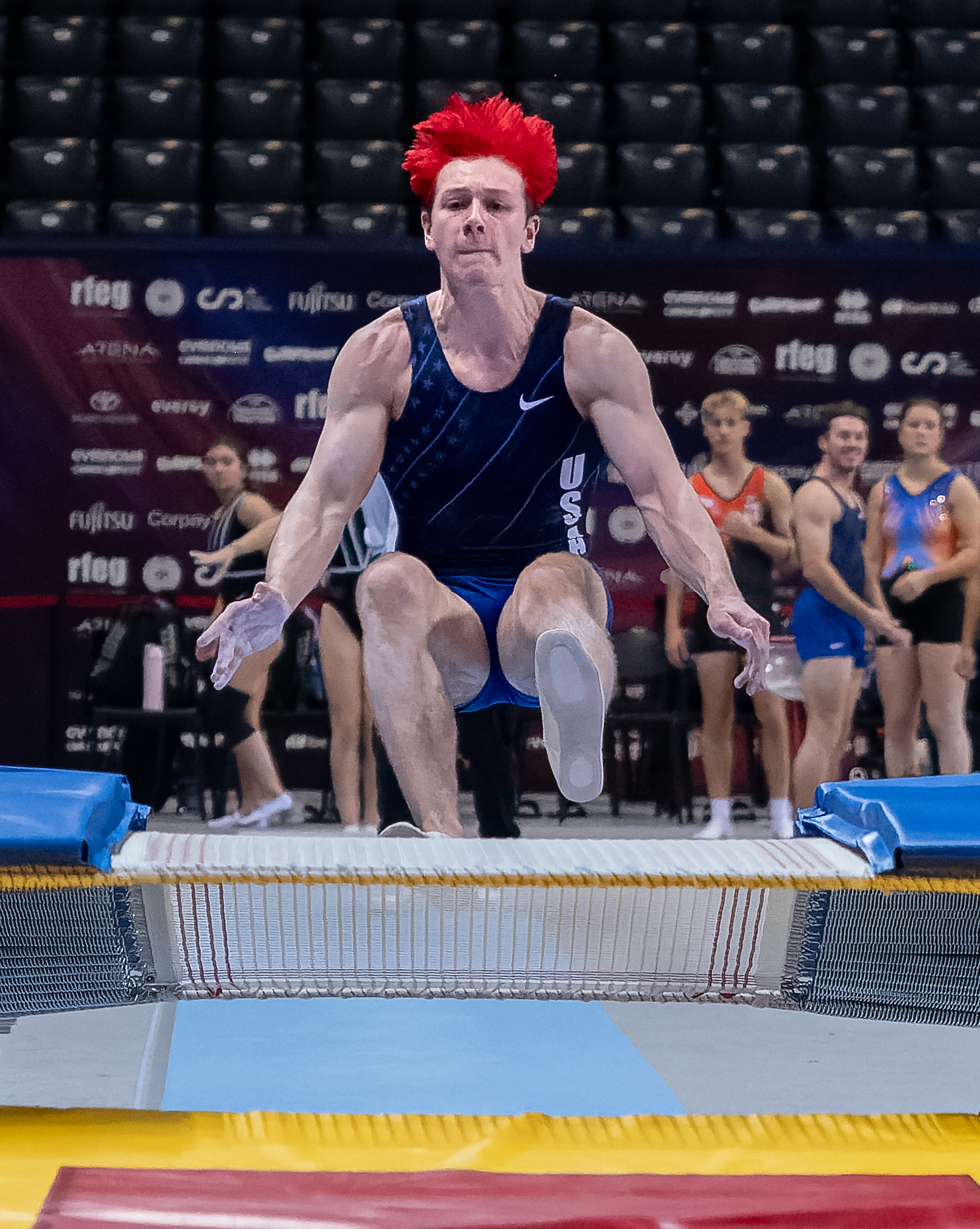

Personal information
- Born: September 20, 2008 (age 18) Milwaukee, Wis.
- Height: 5 ft 9 in (175 cm)

Gymnastics career
- Discipline: Trampoline gymnastics
- Country represented: United States; (2025-present)
- Club: Panhandle Perfection Gymnastics
- Head coach: Blain Fowler
Medal record
Men's trampoline gymnastics
Representing United States
World Gymnastics World Championships
Gold medal – first place	2025 Pamplona	Double Mini Team
Gold medal – first place	2026 Nanjing	Double Mini Individual
Silver medal – second place	2025 Pamplona	Tumbling Team
Bronze medal – third place	2025 Pamplona	Double Mini Individual
Bronze medal – third place	2026 Nanjing	Double Mini Team
Bronze medal – third place	2026 Nanjing	Tumbling Team
World Gymnastics World Championships
Event	1st	2nd	3rd
Tumbling	0	1	1
Double Mini	2	0	2
Total	2	1	3
World Gymnastics World Cup
Silver medal – second place	2026 Alkmaar	Double Mini
Bronze medal – third place	2026 Baku	Tumbling
World Gymnastics World Cup
Event	1st	2nd	3rd
Tumbling	0	0	1
Double Mini	0	1	0
Total	0	1	1
World Age Group Competitions
Gold medal – first place	2022 Sofia	Double Mini
Bronze medal – third place	2023 Birmingham	Double Mini

West Fowler (born September 20, 2008) is an American trampoline gymnast. He is a member of USA Gymnastics' senior national team in two disciplines (double-mini trampoline and tumbling).

== Career ==
Fowler became a senior national team member in 2025 and competed at his first world championships in Pamplona, Spain, at the 2025 Trampoline Gymnastics World Championships. He won three medals at his first world championships. He was part of teams that won gold in double-mini trampoline and silver in tumbling. He also won a bronze medal in individual double-mini trampoline at that event.

Fowler made his World Cup debut, winning a bronze medal in Tumbling at the 2026 Baku World Cup in Azerbaijan. Just three weeks later, he won his second World Cup medal in a different discipline, taking silver athte Alkmaar World Cup in Double Mini Trampoline.

In 2023, he won a bronze medal in the 15-16 age group on double-mini trampoline at the 2023 Trampoline World Age Group Competitions in Birmingham, England.

Fowler won his first international medal, winning gold in the 13-14 age division at the 2022 Trampoline World Age Group Competitions in Sofia, Bulgaria.

== Personal ==
Fowler was born in Milwaukee, Wis.; his parents are Blain and Alie Fowler. Fowler also competes in Artistic Gymnastics. Since 2016, he has trained at Panhandle Perfection Gymnastics, where he is coached by his parents.
