= Ruben Padilla =

American trampoline gymnast

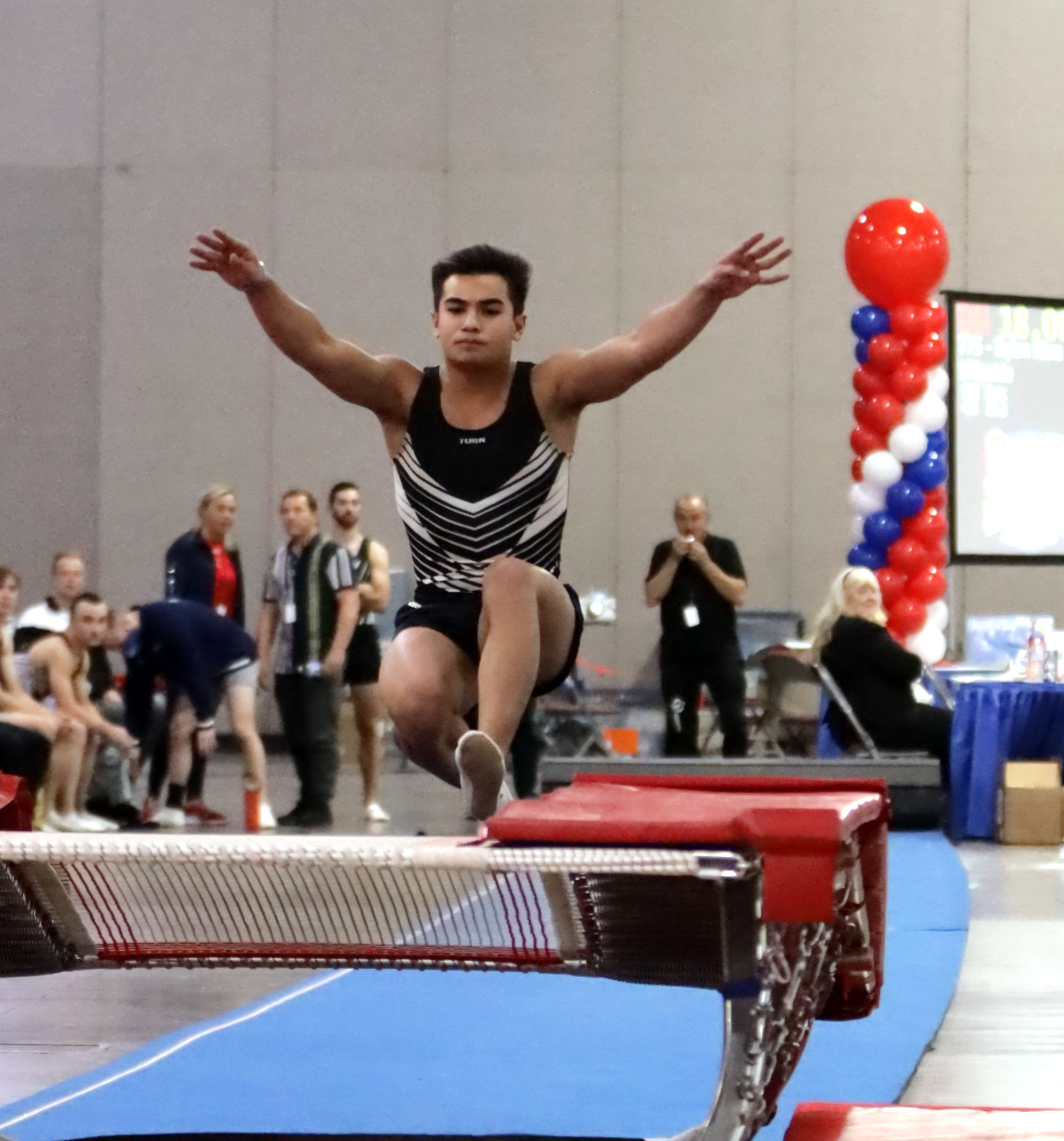

Personal information
- Born: January 5, 2001 (age 25)
- Height: 5 ft 4 in (163 cm)

Gymnastics career
- Discipline: Trampoline gymnastics
- Country represented: United States; (2014-present)
- Club: Wasatch Trampoline and Tumbling
- Head coach: Sven Nielsen
- Former coach: Yoshi Nakayama
Medal record
Men's trampoline gymnastics
Representing United States
World Championships
Gold medal – first place	2022 Sofia	Double Mini
Gold medal – first place	2023 Birmingham	Double Mini
Gold medal – first place	2023 Birmingham	Double Mini Team
Gold medal – first place	2023 Birmingham	All-Around Team
Gold medal – first place	2025 Pamplona	Double Mini
Gold medal – first place	2025 Pamplona	Double Mini Team
Silver medal – second place	2018 Saint Petersburg	Double Mini
Silver medal – second place	2019 Tokyo	Double Mini
Silver medal – second place	2019 Tokyo	Double Mini Team
Silver medal – second place	2019 Tokyo	All-Around Team
Silver medal – second place	2021 Baku	All-Around Team
Silver medal – second place	2022 Sofia	All-Around Team
Silver medal – second place	2023 Birmingham	Synchro
Silver medal – second place	2025 Pamplona	Individual
Bronze medal – third place	2021 Baku	Double Mini
Bronze medal – third place	2022 Sofia	Double Mini Team
Bronze medal – third place	2026 Nanjing	Double Mini Team
Pan American Games
Gold medal – first place	2023 Santiago	Synchro
Bronze medal – third place	2019 Lima	Individual
Pan American Championships
Gold medal – first place	2026 Medellin	Individual
Gold medal – first place	2026 Medellin	Synchro
Gold medal – first place	2026 Medellin	Mixed Synchro
Bronze medal – third place	2026 Medellin	Team
FIG World Cup
Event	1st	2nd	3rd
Individual	1	0	1
Synchro	2	1	1
Double Mini	3	1	0
Total	6	2	2
Junior Pan American Championships
Bronze medal – third place	2018 Cochabamba	Individual

Ruben Padilla OLY (born January 5, 2001) is an American trampoline gymnast. He has won eight senior national titles across three disciplines (double-mini, trampoline, and synchronized trampoline) and three World Championships on double-mini and was named alternate to the 2024 Olympics for men's trampoline.

== Career ==
Padilla became a senior national team member in 2018 and competed at his first world championships in St. Petersburg, Russia, at the 2018 Trampoline Gymnastics World Championships where he won a silver medal in the men's double-mini event.

In 2019, he won a bronze medal in the men's individual event at the 2019 Pan American Games. He then went on to complete a hat trick when he again won the men's double-mini silver medal alongside a silver double-mini team medal, and an all-around team silver medal at the 2019 Trampoline Gymnastics World Championships.

In 2021, he competed in the 2021 Pan American Gymnastics Championships in Brazil and won gold medals in the 17-21 age group and the senior-level synchronized (with partner Cody Gesuelli) trampoline competitions and was a member of the first-place U.S. gymnastics team.

He competed in the men's double-mini trampoline event at the 2022 World Games, and finished fourth. Then, at the 2022 Trampoline Gymnastics World Championships, he won a gold medal in men's double-mini, a silver medal in the all-around team, and a bronze medal in the double-mini team event.

Padilla defended his double-mini title at the 2023 Trampoline World Championships in Birmingham, England and once again won gold in individual men's double-mini, alongside a silver medal in synchronized trampoline with partner Aliaksei Shostak, and a double-mini team gold.

In 2024, he won triple gold at the USAG championships held in Minneapolis, MN, winning men's individual trampoline, men's synchronized trampoline with partner Aliaksei Shostak, and the men's double-mini competition. Additionally, he was named as the alternate to the Olympic Games for men's trampoline.

In 2025, Padilla had a strong World Cup season, winning the double-mini events in Riccione (ITA) and Coimbra (POR), where he performed a triple pike, quad back tuck to set a world difficulty record of 13.9. Owing to his victories in Riccione and Coimbra, he also won the 2025 FIG Trampoline World Cup Series in double mini-trampoline. He placed third in Individual and Synchro with partner Ryan Maccagnan in Varna (BUL), and later won both Individual and Synchro in Antibes (FRA). Padilla competed in the double-mini event at the 2025 World Games, finishing fifth. Later that year, he successfully defended his double-mini title at the World Championships in Pamplona, claiming the world title for the third consecutive time, as well as winning gold in the double-mini team event for the second consecutive time and silver in the individual trampoline.

=== World Cup results ===
World Cup
Year	Place	Medal	Event
2023	Coimbra, Portugal	Gold	Synchro
2023	Coimbra, Portugal	Gold	Double Mini
2024	Palm Beach, FL, USA	Silver	Double Mini
2024	Coimbra, Portugal	Silver	Synchro
2025	Riccione, Italy	Gold	Double Mini
2025	Coimbra, Portugal	Gold	Double Mini
2025	Varna, Bulgaria	Bronze	Individual
2025	Varna, Bulgaria	Bronze	Synchro
2025	Antibes, France	Gold	Individual
2025	Antibes, France	Gold	Synchro

== Personal ==
Padilla was born in Oakley, California; his parents are Nelia and Jerry Padilla. He started his gymnastics career at the age of 5 when his mother enrolled him in artistic gymnastics classes in a bid to stop him from jumping on the furniture at home. Since 2017, he has trained at Wasatch Trampoline and Tumbling in Draper, UT, where he also works as a coach.

He was named the 2020 Double-Mini Athlete of the Year by USA Gymnastics and was again honored with that award in 2024.
