= Havant and South Downs College =

HSDC

Location
- College Road; Waterlooville, Hampshire, PO7 8AA; England

Information
- Type: Further education college
- Motto: Build your confidence, individuality and maximise your potential
- Established: 2017
- Local authority: Hampshire
- Ofsted: Reports
- Principal and Chief Executive: Kurt Hintz (interim)
- Gender: Mixed Education
- Website: www.hsdc.ac.uk

HSDC is a Further education college located in Waterlooville, Hampshire, England. The college was formed on 1 August 2017 following a merger of South Downs College and Havant Sixth Form College.

The College subsequently merged with Alton College on 1 March 2019, to become HSDC, composed of three campuses; HSDC Alton, HSDC Havant and HSDC South Downs. The College provision includes nearly 40 A Level subjects across the three campuses as well as vocational courses including T Levels (from September 2020), UAL and BTEC qualifications and apprenticeships delivered in partnership with leading local and national businesses.

The college has just under 7,500 students, with nearly 4,200 of these being full-time students, and 380 apprentices.

== Campuses ==
HSDC has three main campuses all located within Hampshire:

- HSDC South Downs: This site is the former location of South Downs College and is the Vocational hub of HSDC. Address – College Road, Waterlooville, Hampshire, PO7 8AA
- HSDC Havant: This site is the former location of Havant Sixth Form College and is an A Level Centre of Excellence. Address – New Road, Havant, Hampshire, PO9 1QL.
- HSDC Alton: This site is the former location of Alton College and provides a broad educational offer. Address – Old Odiham Road, Alton, Hampshire, GU34 2LX

== Courses ==
In addition to the full-time A Level and Vocational courses taught at HSDC, there are also a range of part-time and Higher Education courses on offer. A number of the HSDC Higher Education courses are taught in partnership with local universities including the University of Chichester and the University of Portsmouth.

== Academic performance ==
In 2018 the A Level pass rate was 99%.

== History ==
At the time of the original merger in 2016 there were 1,200 students at Havant College and 4,000 at South Downs College.

== Notable alumni ==
- Emma Barton – soap actress who plays Honey Mitchell in EastEnders
- Nick Bright – radio and television presenter.
- Kirsty Dillon – actress who plays Gail Stephens in Midsomer Murders.
- Matt Edmondson – television and radio presenter.
- Donna Jones (British politician) - politician
- Ben Miles – actor.
- Lorraine Stanley – soap actress who plays Karen Taylor in EastEnders.
- Marc Wootton – comedian and actor.
- Comfort Yeates – trampoline gymnast.
