= 2025 Trampoline Gymnastics World Championships =

Gymnastics competition in Pamplona, Spain

2025 Trampoline World Championships
- Venue: Navarra Arena
- Location: Pamplona, Spain
- Start date: 5 November 2025
- End date: 9 November 2025
- Competitors: 359 from 38 nations

The 2025 Trampoline Gymnastics World Championships were held from 6 to 9 November 2025 at the Navarra Arena in Pamplona in Spain.

In the trampoline individual events, Wang Zisai and Hu Yicheng both won the gold medals for China. Former World champion Hikaru Mori won the women's silver medal while Olympic bronze medalist Sophiane Méthot won her first individual World medal. Mori did win the synchro title alongside Saki Tanaka, ahead of Olympic champion Bryony Page and Isabelle Songhurst. The reigning Olympic champion Ivan Litvinovich did not advance into the individual final, but he did win the synchro gold medal alongside Andrei Builou. Additionally, Litvinovich led the Individual Neutral Athletes from Belarus to the gold medal in the trampoline team event, while China won the women's team competition.

In addition to becoming the first American to win a medal in the men's individual trampoline event in 51 years, Ruben Padilla won his third consecutive title in double mini trampoline ahead of Mikhail Zalomin and teammate West Fowler. Additionally, he helped the United States defend its double mini team title. Melania Rodríguez also successfully defended her double mini trampoline World title, and the United States also won the women's team title.

Ethan McGuinness won his second World title in tumbling, and Arina Kaliandra won the women's tumbling event. In the tumbling team events, Azerbaijan won gold in the men's competition and France won the women's title. Katsiaryna Yarshova and Stanislau Yaskevich won the gold medal in the inaugural mixed synchro event.

== Participating nations ==
- Argentina (9)
- Australia (16)
- Austria (1)
- Azerbaijan (6)
- Belgium (10)
- Brazil (5)
- Bulgaria (2)
- Canada (21)
- China (20)
- Czech Republic (10)
- Denmark (13)
- Estonia (1)
- France (15)
- Georgia (3)
- Germany (14)
- Great Britain (22)
- Greece (8)
- Hong Kong (3)
- Ireland (1)
- Israel (2)
- Italy (5)
- Japan (21)
- Kazakhstan (5)
- Mexico (8)
- Netherlands (8)
- New Zealand (7)
- Peru (3)
- Poland (1)
- Portugal (21)
- South Africa (6)
- Spain (21) (Host)
- Sweden (6)
- Switzerland (1)
- Turkey (2)
- Ukraine (12)
- United States (22)
- Uzbekistan (1)
- Individual Neutral Athletes (27)

== Medals ==
Event	Gold	Silver	Bronze
Men
Individual	Wang Zisai (CHN)	Ruben Padilla (USA)	Hayato Miyano (JPN)
Individual team	Individual Neutral Athletes; Ivan Litvinovich; Sebastsyan Stankevich; Andrei Builou; Stanislau Yaskevich	Individual Neutral Athletes; Dmitrii Nartov; Maksim Didenko; Kirill Kozlov; Danila Kasimov	Portugal; Diogo Abreu; Gabriel Albuquerque; Pedro Ferreira; Lucas Santos
Synchro	Individual Neutral Athletes; Andrei Builou; Ivan Litvinovich	Japan; Yusei Matsumoto; Hayato Miyano	China; Yuhan Chen; Wang Dong
Double mini	Ruben Padilla (USA)	Mikhail Zalomin (AIN)	West Fowler (USA)
Double mini team	United States; Trevor Harder; Simon Smith; Ruben Padilla; West Fowler	Australia; Troy Sitkowski; Rohan Wilcox; Nicolas Diaz Ballas; Matthew French	Individual Neutral Athletes; Mikhail Iurev; Mikhail Zalomin; Kirill Panteleev; Dmitrii Nartov
Tumbling	Ethan McGuinness (AUS)	Magnus Lindholmer (DEN)	Martin Abildgaard (DEN)
Tumbling team	Azerbaijan; Mikhail Malkin; Tofig Aliyev; Adil Hajizada; Bilal Gurbanov	United States; West Fowler; Kaden Brown; Xavier Harper; Bailery Mensah	Denmark; Magnus Lindholmer; Martin Abildgaard; Marius Bundgaard; Frederik Skaaning
Women
Individual	Hu Yicheng (CHN)	Hikaru Mori (JPN)	Sophiane Methot (CAN)
Individual team	China; Hu Yicheng; Fan Xinyi; Qiu Zheng; Zhu Xueying	Individual Neutral Athletes; Iana Lebedeva; Viyaleta Bardzilouskaya; Katsiaryna Yarshova; Zlata Miniakhmetava	Japan; Yuka Misawa; Saki Tanaka; Ena Sakurai; Hikaru Mori
Synchro	Japan; Saki Tanaka; Hikaru Mori	Great Britain; Isabelle Songhurst; Bryony Page	China; Hu Yicheng; Zhang Xinxin
Double mini	Melania Rodríguez (ESP)	Galina Begim (AIN)	Kirsty Way (GBR)
Double mini team	United States; Aliah Raga; Kennedi Roberts; Grace Harder; Susan Gill	Great Britain; Kim Beattie; Kirsty Way; Molly McKenna; Emily Lock	Spain; Loreto Tuñón Ginés; Marta López; Melania Rodríguez
Tumbling	Arina Kaliandra (AIN)	Candy Brière-Vetillard (FRA)	Lani Spiessens (BEL)
Tumbling team	France; Maëlie Abadie; Candy Brière-Vetillard; Maëlle Dumitru-Marin; Manon Morancais	Great Britain; Megan Kealy; Jaeda-Lei Jeffers; Naana Oppon; Alisha Evanson	Belgium; Fran Renders; Sara Neyrinck; Lani Spiessens; Marth Renders
Mixed
Synchro	Individual Neutral Athletes; Katsiaryna Yarshova; Stanislau Yaskevich	Japan; Ena Sakurai; Hayato Miyano	Azerbaijan; Seljan Mahsudova; Maqsud Mahsudov
All-around team	China; Hu Yicheng; Zhang Xinxin; You Qing; Li Zhenghuan; Chen Yuhan; Wang Dong; Xue Zhenbang; Fu Shalin; Fan Xinyi; Yan Langyu	Individual Neutral Athletes; Sofiia Aliaeva; Anzhela Bladtceva; Aleksandra Liamina; Mikhail Zalomin; Dmitrii Nartov; Kirill Panteleev; Sergei Finichenko; Galina Begim; Kirill Kozlov	Great Britain; Bryony Page; Isabelle Songhurst; Megan Kealy; Omo Aikeremiokha; Zak Perzamanos; Corey Walkes; Kristof Willerton; Kirsty Way

== Medal table ==
* Host nation (Spain)

Rank	Nation	Gold	Silver	Bronze	Total
–	Individual Neutral Athletes	4	5	1	10
1	China	4	0	2	6
2	United States	3	2	1	6
3	Japan	1	3	2	6
4	Australia	1	1	0	2
4	France	1	1	0	2
6	Azerbaijan	1	0	1	2
6	Spain*	1	0	1	2
8	Great Britain	0	3	2	5
9	Denmark	0	1	2	3
10	Belgium	0	0	2	2
11	Canada	0	0	1	1
11	Portugal	0	0	1	1
Totals (12 entries)		16	16	16	48
