= Adil Hajizada =

Azerbaijani gymnast (born 2005)

Personal information
- Born: 2005 (age 20–21) Azerbaijan

Sport
- Sport: Trampolining
Medal record
Men's trampoline gymnastics
Representing Azerbaijan
World Championships
Gold medal – first place	2025 Pamplona	Tumbling team
Gold medal – first place	2026 Nanjing	Tumbling team

Adil Hajizada (born 2005) is an Azerbaijani athlete who competes in trampoline gymnastics.

== Awards ==
World Championship
Year	Place	Medal	Type
2023	Birmingham (UK)	Gold	Tumbling Team
European Championship
Year	Place	Medal	Type
2021	Sochi (Russia)	Bronze	Tumbling Team (junior)
2024	Guimarães (Portugal)	Gold	Tumbling
