= Yuliya Hall =

American gymnast and coach

- Full name: Yuliya Hall
- Alternative name: Yuliya Stankevich-Brown
- Born: July 16, 1975 (age 51)

Gymnastics career
- Discipline: Trampoline gymnastics
- Country represented: United States; (United States)
- Club: Idaho Elite Gymnastics

Yuliya Stankevich-Brown (born Yuliya Hall July 16, 1975) is an American tumbling gymnast, and coach. She was inducted into USA gymnastics hall of fame.

Hall competed at the 2005 World Championships winning a silver medal, 2007 World Championships winning a gold medal. and 2010 World Trampoline and Tumbling Championships.

Hall was United States national champion in women's tumbling in 2005, 2007, and 2010.

Hall has been coaching at Idaho Elite Gymnastics since 1996.

== Early life ==
Hall's gymnastic career began at the age of 5 years old when she was scouted out by two different agencies in the Soviet Union while playing on the playground near her home. Hall was competing at Elite level by age 11. At age 16, Hall switched to power tumbling. In 1992, Hall came over to the United States to help coach and train young American athletes. She then began competing for the USA Gymnastics Team in 2004.

== National Competition Results ==
- 2015 USA Gymnastics Championships, Greensboro, N.C. – 1st-TU
- 2015 Elite Challenge, Colorado Springs, Colo. – 2nd-TU
- 2014 USA Gymnastics Championships, Louisville, Ky. – 1st-TU
- 2014 U.S. Elite Challenge, Spokane, Wash. – 1st-TU
- 2013 U.S. T&T Championships, Kansas City, Mo. – 1st-TU
- 2013 U.S. Elite Challenge, Frisco, Texas – 1st-TU
- 2012 U.S. Elite Championships, Long Beach, Calif. – 2nd-TU
- 2011 U.S. Elite Championships, San Antonio, Texas – 5th-TU
- 2011 U.S. Elite Challenge, Fort Worth, Texas – 1st-TU
- 2010 Visa Championships, Hartford, Conn. – 1st-TU
- 2010 U.S. Elite Challenge, Virginia Beach, Va. – 3rd-TU
- 2009 U.S. Elite Challenge, Ft. Smith, Ark. – 4th-TU
- 2007 National Championships, Memphis, Tenn. – 1st-TU
- 2007 U.S. Elite Challenge, Colorado Springs, Colo. – 1st-TU
- 2006 U.S. Championships, Schaumburg, Ill. – 4th-TU
- 2006 U.S. Elite Challenge, Las Vegas, Nev. – 1st-TU
- 2006 Winter Classic, Birmingham, Ala. – 1st-TU
- 2005 U.S. Championships, Houston, Texas – 1st-TU
- 2005 U.S. Elite Challenge, Phoenix, Ariz. – 1st-TU
- 2005 Winter Classic, Fort Smith, Ark. – 1st-TU
- 2004 Winter Classic, Salt Lake City, Utah – 1st-TU

== International Competition Results ==
- 2015 World Championships, Odense, Denmark – 5th-TU Team
- 2014 Pan American Championships, Toronto, Canada – 2nd-TU
- 2013 World Championships, Sofia, Bulgaria – 6th-TU
- 2011 World Championships, Birmingham, England – 4th-TU (Team)
- 2011 World Cup, Wuxi City, China – 6th-TU
- 2011 World Cup, St. Petersburg, Russia – 3rd-TU
- 2010 World Championships, Metz, France – 4th-TU
- 2007 World Championships, Quebec City, Quebec, Canada-1st-Team; 7th-TU
- 2007 World Cup, St. Petersburg, Russia –
- 2007 World Cup, Ostend, Belgium – 3rd-TU
- 2007 World Cup, Quebec City, Quebec, Canada – 7th-TU
- 2007 World Cup, Lake Placid, N.Y. –
- 2006 World Cup Final, Birmingham, England – 4th-TU
- 2006 World Cup, Salzgitter, Germany – TU
- 2005 World Championships, Eindhoven, Netherlands – 2nd-Team; 6th-TU
- 2005 World Games, Duisburg, Germany – 3rd-TU
- 2005 World Cup, Sofia, Bulgaria – 2nd-TU
- 2005 World Cup, Levallois, France – 3rd-TU
- 2005 World Cup, Ghent, Belgium – 1st-TU
