= Our Lady's Tumbler =

Illustration of Our Lady's Tumbler from the manuscript Arsenal 3516, showing the tumbler performing with his violin on the ground while an angel reaches down to wipe his face

Our Lady's Tumbler is an anonymous Old French poem of 684 lines, probably written in the 1230s. It has characteristics of the Picard dialect and is preserved in five manuscripts. Its English title is conventional, derived from the title Del Tumbeor Nostre Dame supplied by the scribe of one manuscript. It refers to Mary, mother of Jesus, and a performer who engages in tumbling.

Although the poem and stories derived from it circulated until the end of the Middle Ages, they were mostly forgotten until 1873. Our Lady's Tumbler was printed in that year. Since then it has inspired many works, usually under the title Le Jongleur de Notre Dame, a title also sometimes applied to the original poem.

The protagonist of the poem is a travelling performer, a type of minstrel who dances and engages in acrobatics. Growing weary of his worldly life, he enters the Abbey of Clairvaux as a lay brother. Knowing no Latin and failing to understand the liturgy of the hours, he grows despondent. When the monks gather in the choir to chant the liturgy, he enters the crypt to perform before a statue of Mary. He is discovered by one of the monks, who informs the abbot. While the two watch in secret, they see Mary appear and comfort the lay brother. Soon afterwords, the old tumbler dies and goes to Heaven. The performance observed by the abbot is described at lines 390–409:

The abbot and the monk watch
the entire service of the lay brother,
the very varied tumbles that he performed,
the leaping and dancing,
the prostration before the statue,
the cavorting and bounding,
until he was at the point of collapse.
He presses on in such great exhaustion,
that he must of necessity fall.
Then he sat, so exhausted
that from effort he is completely soaked in sweat,
so that the sweat drips down
from him in the middle of the crypt.
But in a brief while, soon,
his sweet lady assists him,
whom he served completely without falsehood.
She knew to come in his time of need.

== Bibliography ==
- Herlihy, David, ed. (1968). Medieval Culture and Society. Palgrave Macmillan.
- Ziolkowski, Jan M. (2018). The Juggler of Notre Dame and the Medievalizing of Modernity. Vol. 1: The Middle Ages. Open Book Publishers. JSTOR j.ctv4ncp86.
- Ziolkowski, Jan M. (2022). Reading the Juggler of Notre Dame: Medieval Miracles and Modern Remakings. Open Book Publishers. doi:10.11647/OBP.0284. ISBN 978-1-80064-368-0.
