= 2021 European Trampoline Championships =

2021 European Championships
- Location: Sochi, Russia
- Dates: 29 April to 2 May 2021

The 2021 European Trampoline Championships was held from 29 April to 2 May 2021 in Sochi, Russia.

== Medal summary ==
=== Seniors ===
Event	Gold		Silver		Bronze	
Men
Individual Trampoline	Aleh Rabtsau (BLR)	60.815	Uladzislau Hancharou (BLR)	60.580	Andrey Yudin (RUS)	59.725
Synchro	Belarus; Uladzislau Hancharou; Aleh Rabtsau	51.990	Portugal; Diogo Ganchinho; Lucas Santos	50.520	Germany; Fabian Vogel; Caio Lauxtermann	49.930
Trampoline Team	Belarus; Ivan Litvinovich; Aleh Rabtsau; Uladzislau Hancharou; Aliaksei Dudarau	183.805	Portugal; Diogo Abreu; Pedro Ferreira; Lucas Santos; Diogo Ganchinho	175.470	France; Julian Chartier; Allan Morante; Florestan Riou; Josuah Faroux	175.425
Double Mini	Aleksandr Odintsov (RUS)	75.800	Tiago Sampaio Romão (POR)	75.700	Daniel Schmidt (GER)	74.300
Double Mini Team	Russia; Vasilii Makarskii; Aleksandr Odintsov; Mikhail Zalomin; Andrei Gladenkov	115.400	Portugal; Tiago Sampaio Romão; João Caeiro; Luis Afonso; Diogo Cabral	113.800	Sweden; Jonas Nordfors; Linus Oledal; Gustav Tingeloef	107.300
Tumbling	Vadim Afanasev (RUS)	79.300	Aleksandr Lisitsyn (RUS)	77.400	Mikhail Malkin (AZE)	75.300
Tumbling Team	Russia; Aleksandr Lisitsyn; Vadim Afanasev; Aleksei Svetlishnikov; Nikita Lenin	113.800	Denmark; Rasmus Steffensen; Adam Matthiesen; Magnus Lindholmer; Martin Abildgaard	112.100	Portugal; Vasco Peso; Diogo Vilela; André Palma; João Saraiva	101.500
Women
Individual Trampoline	Yana Lebedeva (RUS)	56.685	Lea Labrousse (FRA)	54.365	Marine Jurbert (FRA)	53.870
Synchro	Russia; Anna Kornetskaya; Susana Kochesok	48.700	Belarus; Katsiaryna Yarshova; Viktoriya Kuidan	47.560	Germany; Leonie Adam; Aileen Rösler	45.990
Trampoline Team	Russia; Iana Lebedeva; Susana Kochesok; Anna Kornetskaya; Yana Pavlova	165.470	Belarus; Katsiaryna Yarshova; Tatsiana Piatrenia; Viktoryia Kuidan; Palina Shadzko	159.500	France; Léa Labrousse; Marine Jurbert; Marine Prieur; Anaïs Breche	157.515
Double Mini	Galina Begim (RUS)	70.700	Lina Sjöberg (SWE)	70.600	Dana Sadkova (RUS)	68.200
Tumbling	Tachina Peeters (BEL)	70.800	Viktoriia Danilenko (RUS)	70.600	Candy Briere-Vetillard (FRA)	67.500
Tumbling Team	France; Candy Briere-Vetillard; Manon Morancais; Maelle Dumitru-Marin; Lucie Tumoine	101.100	Russia; Viktoriia Danilenko; Irina Silicheva; Elena Neiman; Polina Dorokhova	100.600	Belgium; Tachina Peeters; Laura Vandervoorde; Evi Milh	98.700

=== Juniors ===
Event	Gold		Silver		Bronze	
Boys
Individual Trampoline	Danila Kasimov (RUS)	58.415	Stanislau Yaskevich (BLR)	57.605	Kirill Kozlov (RUS)	56.120
Synchro	Belarus; Daniil Pshanko; Ivan Melnikau	48.810	Azerbaijan; Huseyn Abbasov; Maqsud Mahsudov	48.520	Russia; Matvei Kiriushov; Dmitrii Nartov	48.070
Trampoline Team	Belarus; Andrei Builou; Stanislau Yaskevich; Ivan Melnikau; Daniil Pshanko	173.090	Portugal; Gabriel Albuquerque; Goncalo Alves; Sergio Aniceto; Bruno Catarino	162.440	Germany; Miguel Feyh; Valentin Risch; Philipp Wolfrum; Lars Garman	158.805
Double Mini	Aleksandr Butko (RUS)	71.700	Brent Deklerck (BEL)	69.000	Martim Lavado (POR)	68.700
Double Mini Team	Russia; Vadim Alisov; Aleksandr Butko; Ilia Matroshilov; Aleksei Tretiakov	109.800	Portugal; Martim Lavado; Rafael Nobre; Francisco Labiza; Tomas Pinto	101.500	Ukraine; Dmytro Dziadevych; Daniil Dolia; Dmytro Titov	86.900
Tumbling	Dmitrii Shatalov (RUS)	71.600	Axel Duriez (FRA)	70.500	Uladzislau Liasnitski (BLR)	67.000
Tumbling Team	Russia; Sergey Finichenko; Dmitrii Shatalov; Danila Medvedev; Murat Koshev	103.600	Belarus; Uladzislau Liasnitski; Leanid Chumak; Dzmitry Pishcheika; Mikita Bohush	98.600	Azerbaijan; Tofig Aliyev; Adil Hajizada; Bilal Gurbanov; Huseyn Asadullayev	97.100
Girls
Individual Trampoline	Anzhela Bladtceva (RUS)	55.550	Mariia Mikhailova (RUS)	54.085	Elif Colak (TUR)	52.385
Synchro	Belarus; Maryia Siarheyeva; Viyaleta Bardzilouskaya	48.500	Turkey; Elif Colak; Sila Karakus	44.830	Russia; Mariia Mikhailova; Anna Epifanova	44.770
Trampoline Team	Russia; Anzhela Bladtceva; Mariia Mikhailova; Natalia Blokhina; Veronika Shmeleva	161.455	Belarus; Viyaleta Bardzilouskaya; Aliaaksandra Staliarova; Zlata Shalkouskaya; Maryia Siarheyeva	156.555	Germany; Luka Kristen Frey; Luisa Braaf; Maya Möller; Aurelia Eislöffel	150.510
Double Mini	Alena Kalashnikova (RUS)	69.100	Sofia Tatarova (RUS)	66.300	Tuva Stjaernborg (SWE)	66.200
Double Mini Team	Russia; Daria Tikhonova; Alena Kalashnikova; Iuliia Korotkova; Sofia Tatarova	102.700	Portugal; Marta Silva; Margarida Carreiro; Rita Abrantes	96.200	Sweden; Thea Liljeroth; Tuva Stjaernborg; Tilda Berg	96.200
Tumbling	Arina Kaliandra (RUS)	67.600	Alexandra Efraimoglou (GRE)	65.800	Kseniia Lutkova (RUS)	65.100
Tumbling Team	Russia; Aleksandra Liamina; Arina Kaliandra; Kseniia Lutkova; Kseniia Tiuzhaeva	96.900	France; Yanna Chomilier; Capucine Dodiot; Laura Evrard; Maiwenn Prevot	89.600	Portugal; Ines Gracio; Francisca Pinto; Matilde Santos	72.800

== Medals ==
=== Total ===
* Host nation (Russia)

Rank	Nation	Gold	Silver	Bronze	Total
1	Russia (RUS)*	19	5	6	30
2	Belarus (BLR)	6	6	1	13
3	France (FRA)	1	3	4	8
4	Belgium (BEL)	1	1	1	3
5	Portugal (POR)	0	7	3	10
6	Sweden (SWE)	0	1	3	4
7	Azerbaijan (AZE)	0	1	2	3
8	Turkey (TUR)	0	1	1	2
9	Denmark (DEN)	0	1	0	1
9	Greece (GRE)	0	1	0	1
11	Germany (GER)	0	0	5	5
12	Ukraine (UKR)	0	0	1	1
Totals (12 entries)		27	27	27	81
