= Aliah Raga =

American trampoline gymnast

- Born: 2004 (age 21–22) Washington, D.C., US

Gymnastics career
Medal record
Women's trampoline gymnastics
Representing United States
World Championships
Gold medal – first place	2025 Pamplona	Double Mini Team
Gold medal – first place	2026 Nanjing	Double Mini Team
Silver medal – second place	2022 Sofia	Double Mini Team
Silver medal – second place	2023 Birmingham	Double Mini

Aliah Raga (born 2004) is an American athlete who competes in trampoline gymnastics. Raga won gold at the 2024 FIG World Cup.

She has won two medals at the World Trampoline Gymnastics Championships.

== Personal life ==
Raga lives in Denton, Maryland. She attended Dulles Gymnastics Academy.

== Awards ==
World Championship
Year	Place	Medal	Proof	Ref
2022	Sofía (Bulgaria)	Silver	Double Mini Team	
2023	Birmingham (UK)	Silver	Double Mini	
World Cup
2024	Coimbra (Portugal)	Gold	Double Mini	
