= Aleksandr Lisitsyn =

Russian trampoline gymnast

- Born: 17 September 1998 (age 28)

Gymnastics career
- Discipline: Trampoline gymnastics
- Country represented: Russia
Medal record
Men's trampoline gymnastics
Representing RGF
World Championships
Gold medal – first place	2021 Baku	Tumbling
Gold medal – first place	2021 Baku	Tumbling Team
Gold medal – first place	2021 Baku	All-Around Team
Representing Russia
World Championships
Gold medal – first place	2019 Tokyo	Tumbling
Silver medal – second place	2019 Tokyo	Tumbling Team
European Championships
Gold medal – first place	2018 Baku	Tumbling Team
Gold medal – first place	2021 Sochi	Tumbling Team
Silver medal – second place	2021 Sochi	Tumbling

Aleksandr Yevgenyevich Lisitsyn (Russian: Александр Евгеньевич Лисицын; born 17 September 1998) is a Russian trampoline gymnast. In 2019, he won the men's tumbling event at the Trampoline World Championships held in Tokyo, Japan. He also won the gold medal in this event at the 2021 Trampoline Gymnastics World Championships held in Baku, Azerbaijan.

He also won the gold medal in the men's team tumbling event at the European Trampoline Championships both in 2018 and in 2021.
