= Ivan Litvinovich =

Belarusian trampoline gymnast

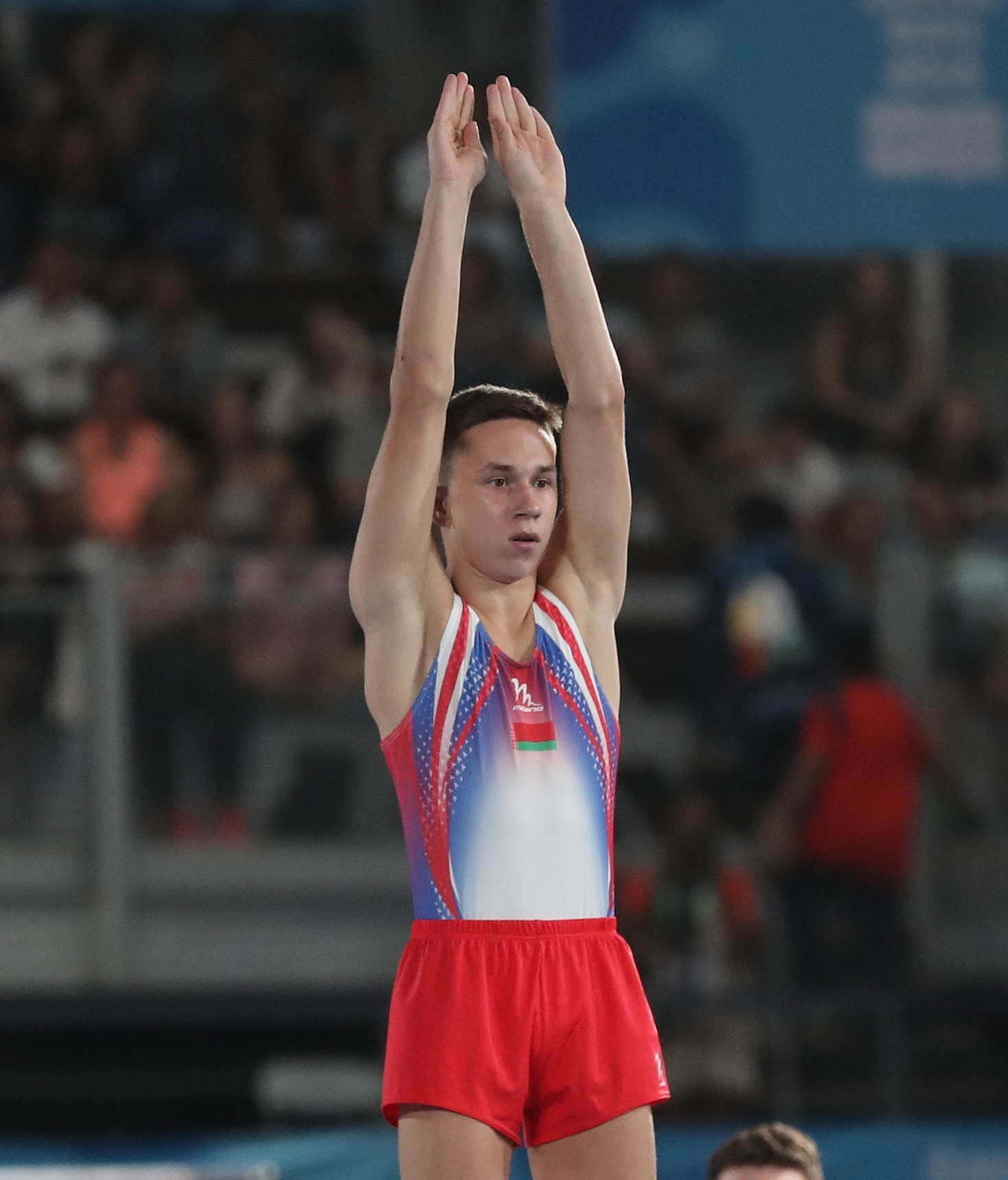
- Litvinovich at the 2018 Summer Youth Olympics

Personal information
- Full name: Ivan Uladzimiravich Litvinovich
- Nickname: Vanya
- Born: 26 June 2001 (age 25) Vileyka, Belarus
- Height: 170 cm (5 ft 7 in)

Gymnastics career
- Discipline: Trampoline gymnastics
- Country represented: Belarus Individual Neutral Athletes
- Club: Republican Centre for Olympic Training in Gymnastic Sports
- Head coach: Olga Vlasova
Medal record
Men's trampoline gymnastics
Representing Belarus and Individual Neutral Athletes
Olympic Games
Gold medal – first place	2020 Tokyo	Individual
Gold medal – first place	2024 Paris	Individual
World Championships
Gold medal – first place	2019 Tokyo	Individual team
Gold medal – first place	2021 Baku	Individual team
Gold medal – first place	2025 Pamplona	Individual team
Gold medal – first place	2025 Pamplona	Synchro
Gold medal – first place	2026 Nanjing	Individual
Gold medal – first place	2026 Nanjing	Individual team
Silver medal – second place	2019 Tokyo	Individual
Bronze medal – third place	2026 Nanjing	Synchro
European Championships
Gold medal – first place	2021 Sochi	Individual team
FIG World Cup
Event	1st	2nd	3rd
Individual	2	1	2
Synchro	1	0	1
Total	3	1	3

Ivan Uladzimiravich Litvinovich (Belarusian: Іва́н Уладзі́міравіч Літвіно́віч; Łacinka: Ivan Uładzimieravič Litvinovič; born 26 June 2001) is a Belarusian trampoline gymnast. He represented Belarus at the 2020 Summer Olympics and won the gold medal in the men's trampoline individual event. He again won the gold medal in the individual event at the 2024 Summer Olympics, as an Individual Neutral Athlete (AIN), making him the first male trampoline athlete ever to win two gold medals in the Olympics and the only AIN to win gold. He is a three-time World champion (2019, 2021, 2025) and the 2021 European champion in the individual team event, and he is the 2019 World individual silver medalist.

== Early life ==
Litvinovich began trampoline gymnastics at age eight. Prior to that, he trained in acrobatic gymnastics because his mother competed in the discipline. He was noticed by the Belarusian national team coach, Olga Vlasova, in 2017 and began training with the national team in Vitebsk.

== Gymnastics career ==
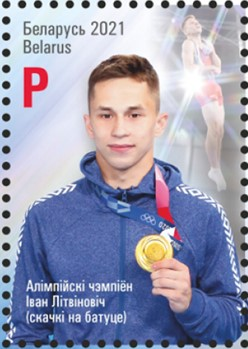
Litvinovich on a stamp issued after he won his first Olympic title

=== 2017–2018 ===
Litvinovich finished fourth as an individual in the 15-16 age group at the 2017 World Age Group Competition, and he won a silver medal in synchronized trampoline (synchro) with Daniil Valyntsau. At the 2018 Junior European Championships, he won the gold medal in the individual event. He then competed in the individual trampoline and mixed multi-discipline team events at the 2018 Summer Youth Olympics in Buenos Aires, without winning a medal. In the individual event, he qualified to compete in the final in first place, but he finished in fourth place due to minor mistakes. He finished seventh in the individual event at the 2018 World Championships.

=== 2019 ===
Litvinovich competed in synchro with Mikita Fomchanka at the Valladolid World Cup, winning the bronze medal. He then won the silver medal in the individual event at the World Championships held in Tokyo, Japan, behind China's Gao Lei. With this result, he earned an Olympic trampoline berth for Belarus. Additionally, he won a gold medal in the individual team event alongside Uladzislau Hancharou, Aleh Rabtsau, and Aliaksei Dudarau. After the competition, he was presented with the VTB Prize for accuracy and elegance.

=== 2020–2021 ===
Litvinovich won the silver medal behind Gao Lei by less than three-tenths of a point at the 2020 Baku World Cup. He did not compete at any other major international events in 2020 due to the COVID-19 pandemic. At the 2021 European Championships in Sochi, Russia, he won the gold medal in the team event alongside Uladzislau Hancharou, Aleh Rabtsau, and Aliaksei Dudarau.

Heading into the postponed 2020 Olympic Games, Litvinovich was considered a "dark horse" contender for the gold medal. He finished in first place in the qualification round. He then won the gold medal in the individual trampoline final, ahead of China's Dong Dong and New Zealand's Dylan Schmidt. This marked a second consecutive men's trampoline title for Belarus, following Uladzislau Hancharou's win in 2016. This was the only gold medal Belarus won at the 2020 Olympics.

At the 2021 World Championships, Litvinovich qualified for the semifinals in first place. However, in the semifinals, he was unable to finish his routine and failed to qualify for the final. He helped Belarus defend its World team title.

=== 2022–2024 ===
In February 2022, Litvinovich competed at the Baku World Cup and won the individual title in addition to winning the synchro title with Andrei Builou. In March 2022, the International Gymnastics Federation (FIG) banned Russian and Belarusian athletes due to the Russian invasion of Ukraine. In 2024, the FIG approved certain athletes as "neutral" to return to international competition, and Litvinovich was one of 14 approved.

Litvinovich returned to competition at the 2024 Baku World Cup, winning the bronze medal in the individual event. He also won the individual bronze medal at the 2024 Cottbus World Cup. He won a quota for the 2024 Olympic Games with his results in the 2024 World Cup series. In June, he was approved to compete as an Individual Neutral Athlete by the International Olympic Committee. At the Olympic Games, he qualified for the individual final in first place and successfully defended his Olympic title ahead of Chinese gymnasts Wang Zisai and Yan Langyu. He became the first male trampoline gymnast to win two gold medals at the Olympic Games. He was the only one out of the 32 Individual Neutral Athletes to win a gold medal.

=== 2025 ===
At the 2025 World Championships, Litvinovich did not advance to the individual finals after bouncing off the trampoline in the semifinals. He competed alongside Andrei Builou in the synchro competition, and they won the gold medal. He also won a gold medal with the Individual Neutral Athletes from Belarus in the team competition.

== Political views ==
After the 2020 Belarusian presidential election and the protests following the re-election of Alexander Lukashenko, Litvinovich signed an open letter in support of Lukashenko. Since 2024, his participation in competitions as a "neutral" athlete has been questioned by the media. At the 2024 Summer Olympics, he declined to answer questions about his previous support of Lukashenko.

On 17 September 2024, Litvinovich alongside other state officials, including military, attended the official ceremony at the Palace of Independence where he was presented with state awards by Belarusian President Aleksandr Lukashenko.

== Awards ==
He received a Certificate of Honor from the Ministry of Sports and Tourism in 2020 following his medals at the 2019 World Championships. In 2022, he received the Order of the Fatherland, III degree for his Olympic gold medal. He then received the Order of the Fatherland, II degree in 2024 for winning his second Olympic gold medal.
