= Bryony Page =

British trampoline gymnast (born 1990)

Bryony Page MBE
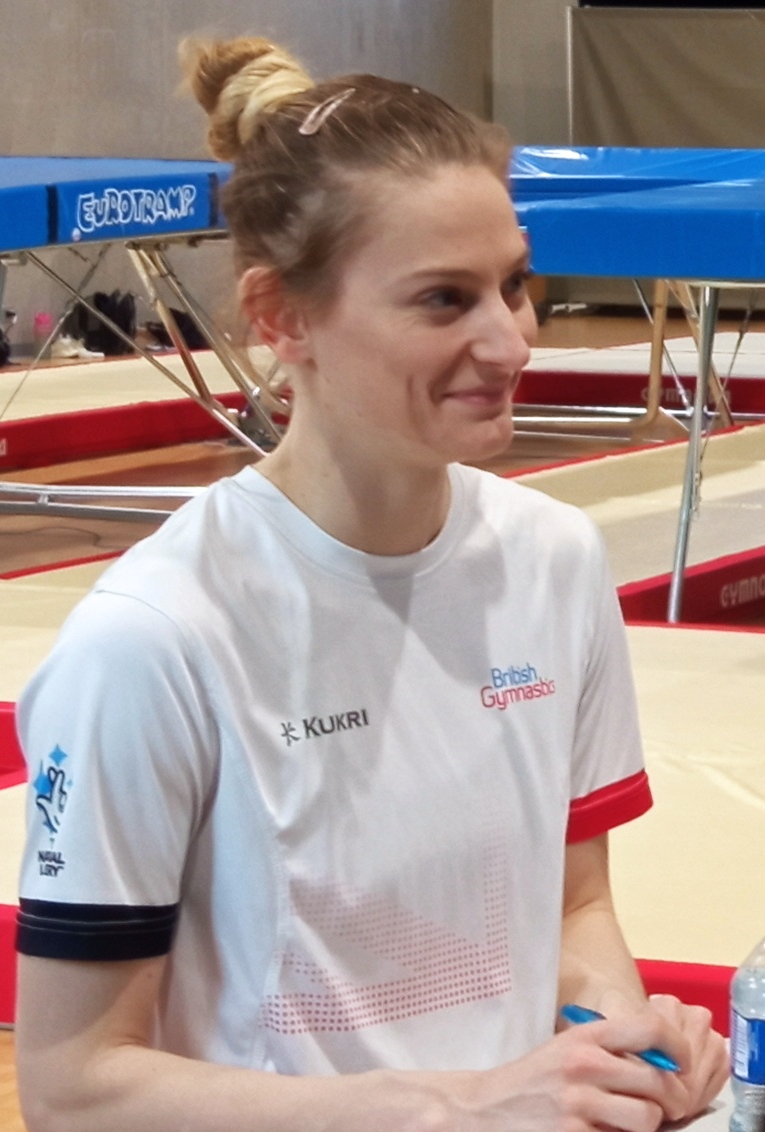
- Page in 2024

Personal information
- Full name: Bryony Kate Frances Page
- Born: 10 December 1990 (age 35) Crewe, England
- Height: 5 ft 8 in (173 cm)

Gymnastics career
- Discipline: Trampoline gymnastics
- Country represented: (10)
- Club: Poole gymnastics and trampoline club
- Head coach: Brian Camp
- Former coach: Paul Greaves
- World ranking: 5th in 2024
Medal record
Women's trampoline gymnastics
Representing Great Britain
Olympic Games
Gold medal – first place	2024 Paris	Individual
Silver medal – second place	2016 Rio de Janeiro	Individual
Bronze medal – third place	2020 Tokyo	Individual
World Championships
Gold medal – first place	2023 Birmingham	Individual
Gold medal – first place	2021 Baku	Individual
Gold medal – first place	2013 Sofia	Team
Gold medal – first place	2022 Sofia	All-around Team
Silver medal – second place	2011 Birmingham	Team
Silver medal – second place	2019 Tokyo	Team
Silver medal – second place	2022 Sofia	Individual
Silver medal – second place	2022 Sofia	Team
Silver medal – second place	2025 Pamplona	Synchro
Silver medal – second place	2026 Nanjing	Synchro
Bronze medal – third place	2023 Birmingham	Synchronized
Bronze medal – third place	2023 Birmingham	All-around Team
Bronze medal – third place	2021 Baku	All-around Team
Bronze medal – third place	2025 Pamplona	All-Around Team
European Championships
Gold medal – first place	2022 Rimini	Individual
Gold medal – first place	2022 Rimini	Synchronized
Gold medal – first place	2024 Guimarães	Individual
Gold medal – first place	2024 Guimarães	Synchronized
- Last updated on: 6 August 2024.

Bryony Kate Frances Page (born 10 December 1990) is a British trampoline gymnast. She won the gold medal at the 2024 Summer Olympics in Paris in individual trampoline. She is the 2021 and 2023 women's individual trampoline world champion, and part of the British team that won team gold at the 2013 world championships, and all-around team gold in 2022.

Page became the first British trampolinist to win an Olympic medal at the 2016 Summer Olympics in Rio de Janeiro, when she won the silver medal. Five years later, at the delayed 2020 Summer Olympics in Tokyo she won the bronze medal. Her triumph in 2024 led to Page becoming the first British gymnast to attain the status of Olympic champion in trampolining, and the first British female individual Olympic champion in gymnastics. With one Olympic gold among five global titles, Page is the most successful British female gymnast across all disciplines in history.

== Early life and education ==
Page was born in Crewe. She attended Brine Leas School and Malbank School and Sixth Form College. She took up trampolining at the age of nine.

Page studied biology at the University of Sheffield, where she received a sports scholarship. She graduated in 2015 with a first-class honours degree, with her thesis being a study of sounds made by dinosaurs. After graduating she concentrated full-time on trampolining.

== Career ==
Early in her career Page struggled with the yips (a loss of fine motor skills in athletes) for two years which affected her confidence and performance, but she overcame it in 2010 with the help of a confidence coach. She competed in her first World Championships in 2010, where she finished fourth in the individual event. At the 2011 World Championships she was part of the team that won the silver medal in the team event. She missed the 2012 Olympic Games in London due to illness and injury problems, but won the individual gold medal at the 2012 World Cup in Sofia.

She won three successive British Championship titles between 2013 and 2015, and was a member of the British teams that won gold at the 2013 World Championships, and the 2014 and 2016 European Championships. She finished fifth in the individual event at the 2015 World Championships.

At the 2016 Olympic Games in Rio de Janeiro, Page and her British teammate Kat Driscoll became Great Britain's first ever finalists in trampolining, with Page qualifying in seventh position. During the final she posted a score of 56.040 which put her in the lead, until defending champion Rosie MacLennan scored 56.465 dropping Page into the second place. Page won the silver medal, the first time that any British trampolinist had won an Olympic medal. At the 2020 Olympic Games in Tokyo, Page won a bronze medal. Later that year, Page won individual gold and was part of the team that won bronze in the team event at the 2021 World Championships.

Page won gold in both the individual and, partnering with Isabelle Songhurst, the synchro event at the 2022 European Trampoline Championships in Rimini.

At the 2022 World Championships, she was part of the Great Britain squad which won the all-round team gold medal and also claimed individual and women's team silver.

Page won the individual gold medal at the 2023 World Championships in Birmingham along with bronze in the women's synchro, partnering with Isabelle Songhurst, and bronze in the all-round team competition.

Repeating her feat of two years earlier, she won individual and, again alongside Isabelle Songhurst, synchro gold at the 2024 European Trampoline Championships in Guimarães.

Page won gold at the 2024 Summer Olympics in Paris, the first trampoline gold won by a British gymnast. Page was one of the Great Britain flag-bearers at the closing ceremony alongside triathlete Alex Yee.

In November 2024, Page announced she was going to train with Cirque du Soleil in Montreal with the aim of joining the group on tour the following year.

Teaming once more with Isabelle Songhurst, she won a silver medal in the women's synchro competition at the 2025 Trampoline Gymnastics World Championships as well as claiming a bronze medal in the mixed all-around team event.

== Awards and honours ==
In 2022, Page was awarded an honorary doctorate from the University of Sheffield for giving distinguished service or bringing distinction to the university, the city of Sheffield, or the region. She was awarded a MBE in 2025 for services to trampoline gymnastics.
