= Ethan McGuinness =

Australian trampoline gymnast (born 2001)

Personal information
- Born: 2001 (age 24–25) Penrith, New South Wales, Australia

Sport
- Sport: Trampolining
Medal record
Men's trampoline gymnastics
Representing Australia
World Championships
Gold medal – first place	2025 Pamplona	Tumbling

Ethan McGuinness (born 2001) is an Australian athlete who competes in trampoline gymnastics.

McGuinness began competing in trampoline gymnastics to learn how to do a backflip as celebration after scoring a try in rugby league. He trained at the Kachan School of Tumbling and Performance.

McGuinness is a two time World Champion, winning gold at the men's tumbling at the 2022 World Championships in Sofia, Bulgaria and the 2025 World Championships in Pamplona, Spain.

== Awards ==
Trampoline Gymnastics World Championships
Year	Place	Medal	Type
2022	Sofía (Bulgaria)	Gold	Tumbling
2025	Pamplona (Spain)	Gold	Tumbling
