= Louise Brownsey =

British gymnast (born 2002)

Personal information
- Born: 2002 (age 22–23); Reigate, United Kingdom

Sport
- Sport: Trampolining

Louise Brownsey (born 2002) is a British athlete who competes in trampoline gymnastics.

She won two medals at the Trampoline Gymnastics World Championships, in 2021 and 2022.

She trains at Jumpers Rebound Centre in Gillingham.

== Awards ==
Trampoline Gymnastics World Championships
Year	Place	Medal	Type
2021	Baku (Azerbaijan)	Bronze	Mixed team
2022	Sofía (Bulgaria)	Silver	Equipment
