= Pedro Ferreira (gymnast) =

Portuguese trampoline gymnast

Pedro Ribeiro Ferreira
Personal information
- Born: March 17, 1997 (age 29) Vila do Conde, Portugal

Sport
- Sport: Trampolining
Medal record
Men's trampoline gymnastics
Representing Portugal
Event	1st	2nd	3rd
World Championships	1	3	1
European Championships	1	3	2
Total	2	6	3
World Championships
Gold medal – first place	2022 Sofia	Team
Silver medal – second place	2018 Saint Petersburg	All-Around
Silver medal – second place	2022 Sofia	Synchro
Silver medal – second place	2023 Birmingham	All-Around
Bronze medal – third place	2022 Sofia	All-Around
Bronze medal – third place	2025 Pamplona	Team
Bronze medal – third place	2026 Nanjing	All-Around team
European Championships
Gold medal – first place	2024 Guimarães	Individual
Silver medal – second place	2021 Sochi	Team
Silver medal – second place	2022 Rimini	Synchro
Silver medal – second place	2022 Rimini	Team
Bronze medal – third place	2026 Portimão	Team
Bronze medal – third place	2016 Valladolid	Synchro
Bronze medal – third place	2016 Valladolid	Team
FIG World Cup
Event	1st	2nd	3rd
Individual	0	1	0
Synchro	0	1	4
Total	0	2	4

Pedro Ribeiro Ferreira (born 17 March 1997) is a Portuguese athlete who competes in trampoline gymnastics.

He won five medals at the Trampoline Gymnastics World Championships between 2018 and 2023, and six medals at the European Trampoline Championships between 2016 and 2024.

== Medals ==
World Championship
Year	Place	Medal	Event
2018	Saint Petersburg (Russia)	Silver	Mixed team
2022	Sofía (Bulgaria)	Gold	Equipment
2022	Sofía (Bulgaria)	Silver	Synced
2022	Sofía (Bulgaria)	Bronze	Mixed team
2023	Birmingham (UK)	Silver	Mixed team
European Championship
Year	Place	Medal	Event
2016	Valladolid (Spain)	Bronze	Synced
2016	Valladolid (Spain)	Bronze	Equipment
2021	Sochi (Russia)	Silver	Equipment
2022	Rímini (Italy)	Silver	Synced
2022	Rímini (Italy)	Silver	Equipment
2024	Guimarães (Portugal)	Gold	Individual
