= Emily Lock =

British trampoline gymnast (born 2007)

Personal information
- Born: 2007 (age 18–19) United Kingdom

Sport
- Sport: Trampolining
Medal record
Women's Double mini trampoline
Representing United Kingdom
World Championships
| Bronze medal – third place | 2026 Nanjing | Double Mini Team |

Emily Lock (born 2007) is a British athlete who competes in trampoline gymnastics.

== Career ==
Lock is from Harrogate. Lock trained at the Liverpool Trampoline Gymnastics Academy. Lock competed at the Artistic Gymnastics World Cup in the junior section. She competed at the World Age Group Championships in Japan. In 2024, she won a silver medal at the Loulé Cup. She made her debut at the 2025 Trampoline Gymnastics World Championships. She won a silver medal alongside Kirsty Way.
