= International Trampoline Federation =

Governing body of trampoline gymnastics

- Abbreviation: FIT
- Formation: 1964
- Dissolved: 1998
- Region served: Worldwide

The Fédération Internationale de Trampoline (FIT; English: International Trampoline Federation) was an international governing body of competitive trampoline gymnastics from 1964 to 1998. The organization was created after the first World Championships for the sport in 1964, during which the sport did not have a governing body. The organization sponsored the Trampoline Gymnastics World Championships during its operation. At the end of 1998 the FIT dissolved, and trampoline gymnastics was integrated into the International Gymnastics Federation in 1999.
