= 2022 Trampoline Gymnastics World Championships =

2022 Trampoline World Championships
- Venue: Arena Sofia
- Location: Sofia, Bulgaria
- Start date: 16 November 2022
- End date: 19 November 2022
- Competitors: 310 from 38 nations

The 2022 Trampoline Gymnastics World Championships was held in Sofia, Bulgaria from 16 to 19 November 2022. It was held in conjunction with the 2022 Trampoline Gymnastics World Age Group Competitions, which was competed the next week in the same arena from 23 to 26 November. This was the third time the World Championships were hosted in Sofia after the 2013 and 2017 Championships.

310 athletes from 38 countries competed in 15 events. The gymnast ambassadors for the event were Radostin Rachev and Anna Dogonadze.

For the first time, Great Britain won the most medals (9) at the championships, including the most gold medals (4). Great Britain won both the men's and women's tumbling team events, as well as the all-around team event, where they tied for points with the United States and won on a tie break. Their fourth title was in women's tumbling, won by 17-year-old Comfort Yeates. Oceanian gymnasts from Australia and New Zealand won four titles, their best-ever performance at the World championships.

Hikaru Mori won Japan's first individual women's title at the World Championships less than an hour after she and Megu Uyama won their second women's synchronized title. The silver medalist, Bryony Page, was given a rare perfect 10 score for displacement in qualifications, which was the first in her career. Dylan Schmidt became the first New Zealand man to win an individual World Championships title and the first non-Chinese man to do so since the 2005 World Championships, while the men's individual team title was won by a Portuguese team for the first time.

== Participating nations ==
- Argentina (3)
- Australia (24)
- Austria (2)
- Azerbaijan (2)
- Belgium (5)
- Brazil (4)
- Bulgaria (3)
- Canada (20)
- China (11)
- Colombia (5)
- Czech Republic (2)
- Denmark (10)
- Egypt (7)
- Estonia (1)
- Finland (1)
- France (13)
- Georgia (2)
- Germany (6)
- Great Britain (23)
- Greece (12)
- India (10)
- Israel (1)
- Italy (5)
- Japan (16)
- Kazakhstan (5)
- Latvia (1)
- Mexico (8)
- Netherlands (8)
- New Zealand (5)
- Poland (4)
- Portugal (24)
- South Africa (2)
- Spain (13)
- Sweden (7)
- Turkey (5)
- Ukraine (13)
- United States (23)
- Uzbekistan (3)

== Medal summary ==
Event	Gold	Silver	Bronze
Men
Individual	Dylan Schmidt (NZL)	Allan Morante (FRA)	Yamato Ishikawa (JPN)
Individual Team	Portugal; Diogo Abreu; Pedro Ferreira; Lucas Santos; Rúben Tavares	France; Julian Chartier; Florestan Riou; Allan Morante; Pierre Gouzou	Germany; Matthias Schuldt; Matthias Pfleiderer; Fabian Vogel; Tim-Oliver Geßwein
Synchro	Germany; Fabian Vogel; Matthias Pfleiderer	Portugal; Diogo Abreu; Pedro Ferreira	France; Florestan Riou; Pierre Gouzou
Double Mini	Ruben Padilla (USA)	Gavin Dodd (CAN)	Tomas Minc (USA)
Double Mini Team	Spain; David Franco; Carlos del Ser; Andrés Martínez; Nicolás Toribio	Portugal; Diogo Cabral; André Dias; João Félix; José Domingues	United States; Tomas Minc; Changamire Anderson; Ruben Padilla; Merrill Hunter
Tumbling	Ethan McGuinness (AUS)	Kristof Willerton (GBR)	Axel Duriez (FRA)
Tumbling Team	Great Britain; Kristof Willerton; Jaydon Paddock; Ramami Levena; Lewis Westwood	Denmark; Mads Hansen; Martin Abildgaard; Johannes Sømod; Jeppe Mikkelsen	United States; Patrick Lyell; Kaleb Cave; Kaden Brown; Dominic Dumas
Women
Individual	Hikaru Mori (JPN)	Bryony Page (GBR)	Hu Yicheng (CHN)
Individual Team	China; Cao Yunzhu; Zhu Xueying; Hu Yicheng; Fan Xinyi	Great Britain; Isabelle Songhurst; Bryony Page; Louise Brownsey	Japan; Risa Kiryu; Hikaru Mori; Megu Uyama; Narumi Tamura
Synchro	Japan; Hikaru Mori; Megu Uyama	France; Marine Jurbert; Léa Labrousse	Mexico; Mariola García; Dafne Navarro Loza
Double Mini	Bronwyn Dibb (NZL)	Tristan van Natta (USA)	Cheyanna Robinson (AUS)
Double Mini Team	Australia; Cheyanna Robinson; Keara Nel; Carina Hagarty; Braida Thomas	United States; Shelby Nobuhara; Maia Amano; Tristan van Natta; Aliah Raga	Great Britain; Bethany Williamson; Kim Beattie; Kirsty Way; Ruth Shevelan
Tumbling	Comfort Yeates (GBR)	Koralee Catlett (AUS)	Shanice Davidson (GBR)
Tumbling Team	Great Britain; Shanice Davidson; Comfort Yeates; Megan Kealy; Jessica Brain	United States; Anastasia Katchalova; Tia Taylor; Miah Bruns; Isabel Steinmetz	France; Candy Brière-Vetillard; Maëlle Dumitru-Marin; Manon Morançais; Émilie Wambote
Mixed
All-around Team	Great Britain; Lewis Gosling; Megan Kealy; Rhys Northover; Bryony Page; Zak Perzamanos; Isabelle Songhurst; Andrew Stamp; Kirsty Way; Lewis Westwood	United States; Nicole Ahsinger; Kaden Brown; Miah Bruns; Cody Gesuelli; Ruben Padilla; Zachary Ramacci; Aliaksei Shostak; Jessica Stevens; Tristan van Natta; Cheyenne Webster	Portugal; Diogo Abreu; Margarida Agostinho; Diogo Cabral; Sofia Correia; Pedro Ferreira; Diana Gago; Ingrid Maior; Vasco Peso

== Medal table ==
Rank	Nation	Gold	Silver	Bronze	Total
1	Great Britain	4	3	2	9
2	Australia	2	1	1	4
3	Japan	2	0	2	4
4	New Zealand	2	0	0	2
5	United States	1	4	3	8
6	Portugal	1	2	1	4
7	China	1	0	1	2
7	Germany	1	0	1	2
9	Spain	1	0	0	1
10	France	0	3	3	6
11	Canada	0	1	0	1
11	Denmark	0	1	0	1
13	Mexico	0	0	1	1
Totals (13 entries)		15	15	15	45
