= World Gymnastics =

International gymnastics governing body

- Formation: 23 July 1881; 145 years ago
- Founded at: Liège, Belgium
- Headquarters: Avenue de la Gare 12
- Location: Lausanne, Switzerland
- Region served: Worldwide
- President: Morinari Watanabe
- Affiliations: Longines, VTB, Cirque du Soleil
- Revenue: US$17.32 million (2019)
- Expenses: US$16.19 million (2019)
- Website: Gymnastics.sport
- Formerly called: International Gymnastics Federation (FIG)

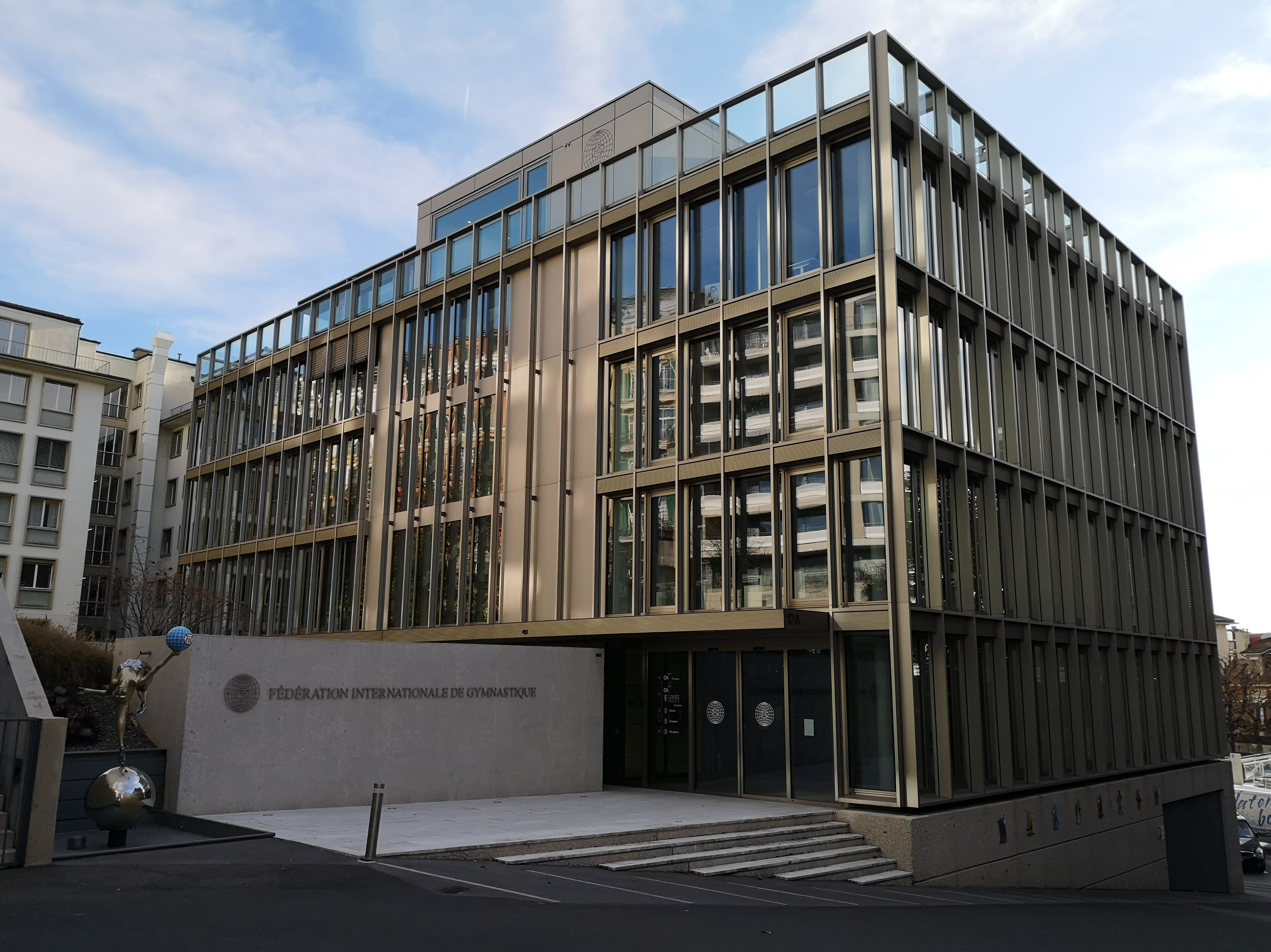
World Gymnastics headquarters in Lausanne since 2016

World Gymnastics, formerly the International Gymnastics Federation, is the body governing competition in all disciplines of gymnastics. Its headquarters is in Lausanne, Switzerland. It was founded on 23 July 1881 in Liège, Belgium, making it the world's oldest existing international sports organisation. Originally called the European Federation of Gymnastics, it had three member countries — Belgium, France and the Netherlands — until 1921, when non-European countries were admitted and the organization changed its name to the Fédération Internationale de Gymnastique. Following other sport governing bodies, the organization took its current name in December 2025.

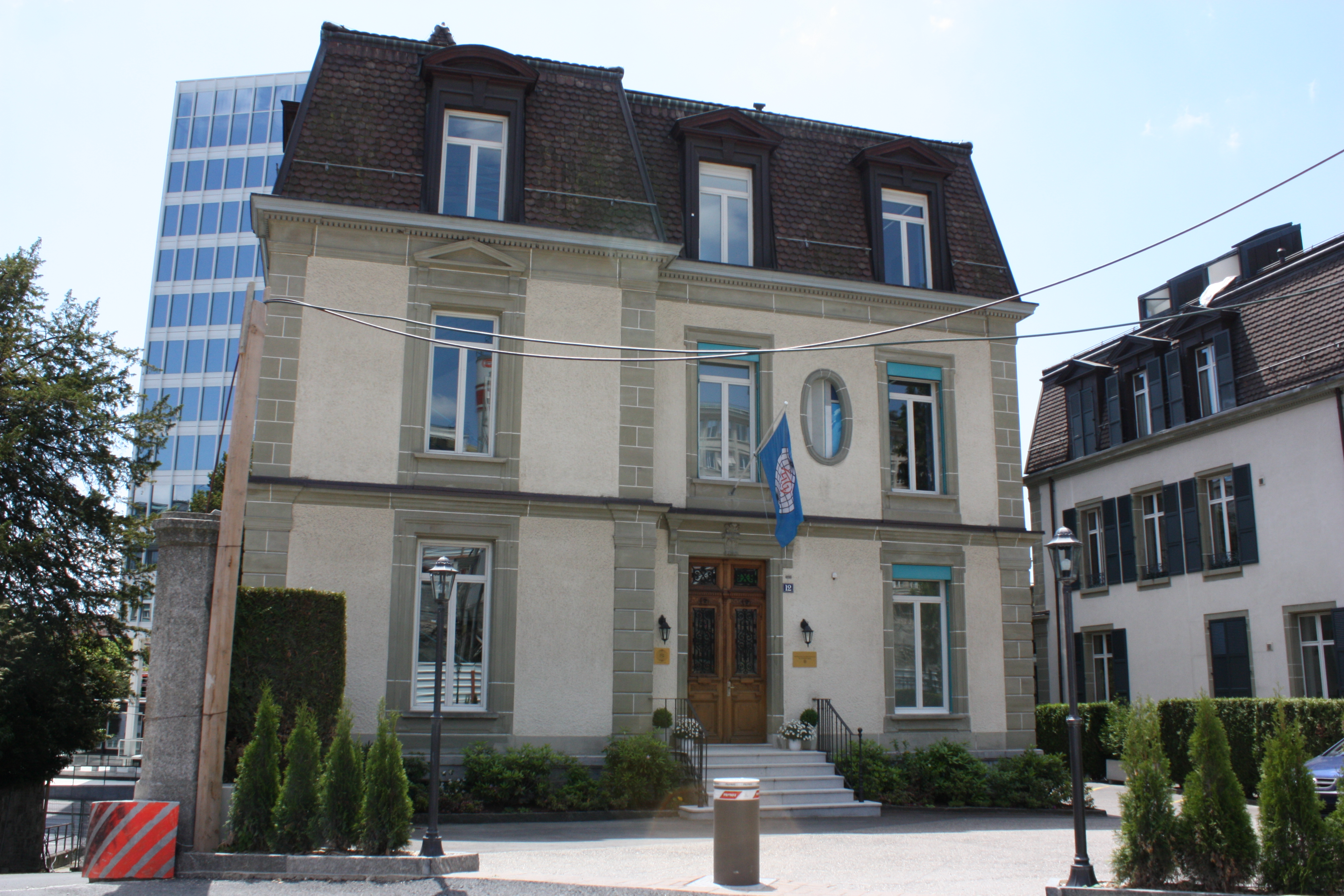
World Gymnastics headquarters in Lausanne (2008–2016)

The federation sets the rules, known as the Code of Points, that regulate how gymnasts' performances are evaluated. Seven gymnastics disciplines are governed by World Gymnastics: artistic gymnastics, further classified as men's artistic gymnastics and women's artistic gymnastics; rhythmic gymnastics; aerobic gymnastics; acrobatic gymnastics; trampolining; double mini trampoline, tumbling and parkour. Additionally, the federation is responsible for determining gymnasts' age eligibility to participate in the Olympics.

== Organization ==
The main governing bodies of the federation are the president and vice presidents, the Congress held every two years, the executive committee, the council, and technical committees for each of the disciplines.

In 2023, there were 161 national federations affiliated with World Gymnastics, one of which have been suspended, as well as one associated federation, one provisional federation and the following five continental unions:

- European Gymnastics (UEG)
- Pan-American Gymnastic Union (PAGU)
- Asian Gymnastic Union (AGU)
- African Gymnastics Union (UAG)
- Oceania Gymnastics Union (OGU)

Across all disciplines, participation in World Gymnastics-sanctioned events exceeds 30,000 athletes, about 70% of whom are female.

=== Russia and Belarus suspension ===
After the 2022 Russian invasion of Ukraine, World Gymnastics barred Russian athletes and officials, including judges. It also announced that "all of the World Gymnastics World Cup and World Challenge Cup events planned to take place in Russia ... are cancelled, and no other World Gymnastics events will be allocated to Russia ... until further notice." World Gymnastics also banned the Russian flag at its events.

On 19 July 2023, World Gymnastics decided to allow Russian and Belarusian athletes and support personnels to participant events under individual neutral athletes.

On 18 May 2026, all previously imposed restrictions on Russian and Belarusian athletes, starting in 2022, have been lifted, allowing them to return as part of full national delegations.

=== Presidents, and their tenures, of World Gymnastics ===
Period	Name	Country
1881–1924	fr:Nicolaas Cupérus	Belgium
1924–1933	Charles Cazalet	France
1933–1946	Count Adam Zamoyski	Poland
1946–1956	Count Felix Goblet d’Alviella	Belgium
1956–1966	Charles Thoeni	Switzerland
1966–1976	Arthur Gander	Switzerland
1976–1996	Yuri Titov	Soviet Union; Russia
1996–2016	Bruno Grandi	Italy
January 2017 – present	Morinari Watanabe	Japan

Morinari Watanabe has served as president of the organization since his election in 2017.

== Tournaments ==
According to the technical regulations of World Gymnastics, the competitions officially organized are:

- World Gymnastics Championships
  - World Artistic Gymnastics Championships
  - World Rhythmic Gymnastics Championships
  - Trampoline and Tumbling World Championships
  - Aerobic Gymnastics World Championships
  - World Acrobatic Gymnastics Championships
  - Parkour World Championships
- World Cup series
  - Artistic Gymnastics World Cup
  - Rhythmic Gymnastics World Cup
  - Trampoline World Cup
  - Acrobatic Gymnastics World Cup
  - Aerobic Gymnastics World Cup
  - Parkour World Cup
- World Challenge Cup series
  - Artistic Gymnastics World Challenge Cup
  - Rhythmic Gymnastics World Challenge Cup

Other official World Gymnastics competitions include:

- Olympic Games
- Youth Olympic Games
- World Games
- Junior World Gymnastics Championships
  - Junior World Artistic Gymnastics Championships
  - Junior World Rhythmic Gymnastics Championships
- World Age Group Competitions

Defunct events formerly organized of sanctioned by World Gymnastics:

- Four Continents Gymnastics Championships
- Junior World Acrobatic Gymnastics Championships
- Olympic Games Test Events

== Age eligibility rules ==
World Gymnastics regulates the age at which gymnasts are allowed to participate in senior-level competitions. The purpose is to protect young gymnasts. This has caused some controversy, and there have been cases of age falsification.

== See also ==
- Major achievements in gymnastics by nation
- International Trampoline Federation
