= European Trampoline Championships =

Sporting event

- Status: Active
- Genre: Sports Event
- Date: Midyear
- Frequency: Biannual
- Inaugurated: 1969
- Most recent: 2026
- Organiser: UEG or EUG or EG

The European Trampoline Championships, sometimes referred to more formally as the European Championships in Trampoline, Double-Mini-Tramoline and Tumbling is the main trampoline gymnastics championships in Europe, including the disciplines of Double mini trampoline and tumbling, organised by European Gymnastics.

== Events ==
- Trampoline: Individual, Team, Synchro
- Double Mini Tramoline: Individual, Team
- Tumbling: Individual, Team

== Editions ==
Seniors since 1969, Juniors since 1972, Seniors and Juniors at the same time since 2000.

1969: Fédération française des sports au trampoline (FFST) was formed in 1965 and organized the 1st European Championship in 1969.

1969-1998: Fédération Internationale de Trampoline (FIT) was formed in 1964 and organized European Championships from 1969 to 1998.

Trampoline Gymnastics = Member of FIG since 1 January 1999.

S: Seniors / J: Juniors

# S (J)	Year	Host city	Host country	Events (S+J)	Senior Men's Champion (Individual Trampoline)	Senior Women's Champion (Individual Trampoline)	Junior Men's Champion (Individual Trampoline)	Junior Women's Champion (Individual Trampoline)	First in medal table
Seniors / Juniors (FIT)
1	1969	Paris	France	4	(United Kingdom) Paul Luxon	(West Germany) Ute Czech			West Germany
2	1971	Ghent	Belgium	8 (Note: Includes four 'B'-class events)	(United Kingdom) Paul Luxon	(West Germany) Margarete Duell			West Germany
(1)	1972	Cardiff	Great Britain	4			(United Kingdom) Robert Anderson	(United Kingdom) Wendy Wright	West Germany
3	1973	Edinburgh	Great Britain	4	(France) Richard Tison	(Soviet Union) Olga Starikova			Soviet Union
(2)	1974	Copenhagen	Denmark	4			(United Kingdom) Simon Rees	(West Germany) Christiane Rother	West Germany
4	1975	Basel	Switzerland	4	(Soviet Union) Eugeni Jakovenko	(Soviet Union) Svetlana Levina			Soviet Union
(3)	1976	Düsseldorf	West Germany	4			(Soviet Union) Alexandr Mikrukov	(Switzerland) Ruth Keller	Soviet Union
5	1977	Essen	West Germany	4	(Soviet Union) Eugeni Janes	(Soviet Union) Victoria Belyayeva			Soviet Union
(4)	1978	Copenhagen	Denmark	4			(United Kingdom) Stewart Matthews	(West Germany) Ute Scheile	West Germany
6	1979	Paris	France	4	(United Kingdom) Stewart Matthews	(Soviet Union) Ludmilla Karpova			Soviet Union
(5)	1980	Edinburgh	Great Britain	4			(United Kingdom) Carl Furrer	(Soviet Union) Ludmilla Karpova	Soviet Union
7	1981	Brighton	Great Britain	6	(United Kingdom) Carl Furrer	(Switzerland) Ruth Keller			Soviet Union
(6)	1982	Moulins	France	8			(France) Lionel Pioline & (Soviet Union) Vadim Krasnochapka	(United Kingdom) Sue Shotton & (Soviet Union) Irena Tolmacheva	Soviet Union
8	1983	Burgos	Spain	12	(Soviet Union) Igor Bogachev	(United Kingdom) Andrea Holmes & (United Kingdom) Sue Shotton			Great Britain
(7)	1984	Leopoldsburg	Belgium	12			(Soviet Union) Sergei Nestreliai	(United Kingdom) Andrea Holmes	West Germany
9	1985	Groningen	Netherlands	14	(Soviet Union) Vadim Krasnoshapka	(United Kingdom) Andrea Holmes			France
(8)	1986	Częstochowa	Poland	14			(Soviet Union) Dmitri Poliaroush	(United Kingdom) Andrea Holmes	Soviet Union
10	1987	Braga	Portugal	14	(Soviet Union) Vadim Krasnoshapka	(Soviet Union) Elena Kolomejez			Soviet Union
(9)	1988	Salzgitter	West Germany	13			(Soviet Union) Dmitri Poliaroush	(Soviet Union) Anna Dogonadze	Soviet Union
11	1989	Copenhagen	Denmark	14	(Soviet Union) Alexander Moskalenko	(Soviet Union) Tatiana Luschina			Soviet Union
(10)	1990	Uppsala	Sweden	14			(Soviet Union) Zakharia Abramishvili	(Soviet Union) Anna Dogonadze	Soviet Union
12	1991	Poznań	Poland	14	(Soviet Union) Alexander Moskalenko	(United Kingdom) Andrea Holmes			Soviet Union
(11)	1992	Deinze	Belgium	14			(Latvia) Oleg Lupalo	(Russia) Irina Karavaeva	Ukraine
13	1993	Sursee	Switzerland	14	(France) Fabrice Schwertz	(United Kingdom) Susan Challis			Germany
(12)	1994	Houthalen-Helchteren	Belgium	14			(Belarus) Vladimir Kakorko	(Russia) Natalia Chernova	Portugal
14	1995	Antibes	France	13	(Belarus) Dmitri Poliaroush	(Russia) Irina Karavaeva			Russia
(13)	1996	Saint Petersburg	Russia	14			(Russia) Sergei Iachev	(United Kingdom) Jaime Moore	Russia
15	1997	Eindhoven	Netherlands	14	(France) David Martin	(Belarus) Galina Lebedeva			Russia
(14)	1998	Villa do Conde	Portugal	10			(France) Sebastien Laifa	(Russia) Marina Mourinova	Russia
16	1998	Dessau	Germany	14	(Russia) German Khnytchev	(Germany) Anna Dogonadze			Russia
Seniors + Juniors (UEG/EG)
17 (15)	2000	Eindhoven	Netherlands	14+14	(Russia) German Khnytchev	(Russia) Irina Karavaeva	(Germany) Karsten Kuritz	(Germany) Vera Nohse	Russia
18 (16)	2002	Saint Peterburg	Russia	13+12	(Russia) Alexander Moskalenko	(Russia) Natalia Chernova	(Russia) Andre Oudalov	(United Kingdom) Hannah Lewis	Russia
19 (17)	2004	Sofia	Bulgaria	14+14	(Ukraine) Yuri Nikitin	(Russia) Irina Karavaeva	(Russia) Dmitry Ushakov	(Portugal) Ana Rente	Russia
20 (18)	2006	Metz	France	14+14	(Russia) Alexandr Rusakov	(Russia) Irina Karavaeva	(Russia) Mikhail Melnik	(Georgia (country)) Luba Golovina	Russia
21 (19)	2008	Odense	Denmark	14+14	(Ukraine) Yuri Nikitin	(Russia) Irina Karavaeva	(Russia) Mikhail Melnik	(United Kingdom) Emma Smith	Russia
22 (20)	2010	Varna	Bulgaria	14+12	(France) Gregoire Pennes	(Russia) Irina Karavaeva	(Greece) Apostolos Koutavas	(Russia) Irina Kundius	Russia
23 (21)	2012	Saint Petersburg	Russia	14+14+2 (Note: Includes two events in U21)	(Russia) Dmitry Ushakov	(Belarus) Tatsiana Piatrenia	(Spain) Ángel Hernández	(Belarus) Lizaveta Kazlova	Russia
24 (22)	2014	Guimarães	Portugal	14+14	(Belarus) Uladzislau Hancharou	(Belarus) Hanna Harchonak	(Russia) Oleg Selyutin	(United Kingdom) Isabelle Songhurst	Russia
25 (23)	2016	Valladolid	Spain	14+14	(Belarus) Uladzislau Hancharou	(Russia) Yana Pavlova	(Belarus) Artur Mikishka	(Russia) Meri Golota	Russia
26 (24)	2018	Baku	Azerbaijan	14+14	(Portugal) Diogo Ganchinho	(Russia) Yana Pavlova	(Belarus) Ivan Litvinovich	(Belarus) Katsiaryna Yarshova	Russia
27 (25)	2021	Sochi	Russia	13+14	(Belarus) Aleh Rabsau	(Russia) Yana Lebedeva	(Russia) Danila Kasimov	(Russia) Anzhela Bladtceva	Russia
28 (26)	2022	Rimini	Italy	14+13	(France) Allan Morante	(United Kingdom) Bryony Page	(Azerbaijan) Maqsud Mahsudov	(Italy) Silvia Coluzzi	Great Britain
29 (27)	2024	Guimarães	Portugal	14+12	(Portugal) Pedro Ferreira	(United Kingdom) Bryony Page	(Turkey) Sinan Cankurt	(Netherlands) Thalissa Wijkstra	Great Britain
30 (28)	2026	Portimão	Portugal	14+14+3 (Note: Includes three events in U21)	(Individual Neutral Athletes) Ivan Litvinovich	(Individual Neutral Athletes) Anzhela Bladtceva	(Individual Neutral Athletes) Aleksei Gurin	(Individual Neutral Athletes) Glafira Zaiko	Authorised Neutral Athletes
31 (29)	2028	Tbilisi	Georgia	14+14+3	Future event				

== Medals (1969-2024) ==
=== Seniors (1969-2024) ===
Incomplete

Rank	Nation	Gold	Silver	Bronze	Total
1	Russia	85	38	25	148
2	Soviet Union*	37	15	6	58
3	France	35	28	28	91
4	Great Britain	34	35	39	108
5	Portugal	22	32	23	77
6	Belarus	22	21	20	63
7	West Germany*	19	8	4	31
8	Germany	17	19	25	61
9	Ukraine	11	11	26	48
10	Spain	11	5	17	33
11	Poland	7	8	9	24
12	Belgium	5	5	7	17
13	Denmark	4	5	7	16
14	Bulgaria	4	3	5	12
15	Azerbaijan	2	3	2	7
16	Georgia	1	6	3	10
17	Sweden	1	4	5	10
18	Netherlands	1	3	2	6
19	Switzerland	1	1	1	3
20	Slovakia	1	1	0	2
21	Greece	1	0	1	2
22	Moldova	0	0	1	1
Totals (22 entries)		321	251	256	828

- Former Countries.

== See also ==
- Trampoline Gymnastics World Championships
- Junior World Gymnastics Championships
- African Trampoline Championships
- Asian Gymnastics Championships
- Pan American Gymnastics Championships
- South American Gymnastics Championships

== Results ==
- Full Results
- https://www.the-sports.org/gymnastics-european-trampoline-championships-2022-medals-epa120866.html
- https://www.the-sports.org/gymnastics-european-trampoline-championships-2021-medals-epa113260.html
- https://www.the-sports.org/gymnastics-european-junior-trampoline-championships-results-2022-men-epm122558.html
- https://www.the-sports.org/gymnastics-european-junior-trampoline-championships-results-2022-women-epf122558.html
- https://web.archive.org/web/20140317164150/http://www.acrobaticsports.net/
- https://web.archive.org/web/20140617205114/http://www.acrobaticsports.net/category/competitions-trampoline-tumbling/tra-competitions-continentales/tra-competitions-europe/
- https://backend.europeangymnastics.com/sites/default/files/paragraph/age-group-competition-info/competition-results/1983%20ECh%20ESP.pdf
- 1969-1989 Results ECh and YECh.pdf - Euro Gymnastics
- https://www.ffgym.fr/download/576028c7452bdcda1f8b4568/Dossier%20de%20presse%20TR-TU_Valladolid%202016.pdf
- http://www.sport-komplett.de/sport-komplett/sportarten/t/trampolin/hst/16.html
- https://www.gymmedia.com/
- https://web.archive.org/web/20150205035142/http://www.ueg.org/en/24th-European-Championships-in-Trampoline/Double-Mini-Trampoline/Tumbling--Guimaraes/POR-2014-2014-04-07
- https://web.archive.org/web/20240000000000*/http://www.ueg.org/
