= Naana Oppon =

British trampoline gymnast (born 2006)

Personal information
- Born: 2006 (age 19–20) Milton Keynes, United Kingdom

Sport
- Sport: Trampolining
Medal record
Women's Tumbling
Representing Great Britain
World Championships
Silver medal – second place	2025 Pamplona	Tumbling Team

Naana Oppon (born 2006) is a British athlete who competes in trampoline gymnastics.

== Personal life ==
Oppon began tumbling at the age of four, attracted by the power the sport requires. She admires Simone Biles and has said that she hopes to inspire other black girls to take up tumbling. Her father, and previously her mother, works at two jobs to support her gymnastics career.

== Career ==
Oppon competed in the junior division of the 2022 European Championships and contributed to a team gold medal. In November, she won the tumbling event in her age group at the 2022 World Age Group Competition in Sofia, Bulgaria.

She made her senior debut at the World Cup in Coimbra, where she won silver, which she called a "very gratifying and a self-affirming experience". Later that year, she won the British championships at the age of 16 and was selected to compete at the 2023 World Championships. In the women's team event, she helped the British women's tumbling team win their second title in a row along with her teammates Saskia Servini, Megan Kealy, and Shanice Davidson.

In 2024, she competed at the 2024 European Championships. She won the tumbling team title there with her teammates Kealy, Servini, and Comfort Yeates.

== Awards ==
World Championship
Year	Place	Medal	Event
2023	Birmingham (UK)	Gold	Tumbling Team
European Championship
Year	Place	Medal	Type
2024	Guimarães (Portugal)	Gold	Tumbling Team
