= Trampoline gymnastics at the 2025 World Games =

- Venue: Dong'an Lake Sports Park Gymnasium
- Dates: 8–10 August 2025
- No. of events: 6
- Competitors: 64 from 19 nations

The trampoline gymnastics competition at the 2025 World Games took place from 8 to 10 August 2025 at the Dong'an Lake Sports Park Gymnasium in Chengdu, China. The discipline included six events. Two synchronized events were added.

== Qualification ==
A total of eight gymnasts qualified for each event. The 2023 Trampoline Gymnastics World Championships served as the main qualifying event.

== Participating nations ==
- Argentina (1)
- Australia (6)
- Azerbaijan (1)
- Belgium (2)
- Canada (4)
- China (2)
- Czech Republic (2)
- Denmark (1)
- France (6)
- Germany (3)
- Great Britain (8)
- Greece (1)
- Japan (3)
- Netherlands (2)
- Portugal (5)
- Spain (2)
- Sweden (3)
- United States (8)
- Ukraine (4)

== Medal table ==
* Host nation (China)

Rank	Nation	Gold	Silver	Bronze	Total
1	Portugal	2	0	0	2
2	Great Britain	1	1	1	3
3	United States	1	1	0	2
4	Belgium	1	0	0	1
4	China*	1	0	0	1
6	Azerbaijan	0	1	0	1
6	France	0	1	0	1
6	Japan	0	1	0	1
6	Netherlands	0	1	0	1
10	Canada	0	0	2	2
11	Germany	0	0	1	1
11	Greece	0	0	1	1
11	Spain	0	0	1	1
Totals (13 entries)		6	6	6	18

== Events ==
=== Men ===
Event	Gold	Silver	Bronze
Double Mini	Brent Deklerck; Belgium	Omo Aikeremiokha; Great Britain	Gavin Dodd; Canada
Synchronized	Portugal; Gabriel Albuquerque; Lucas Santos	Netherlands; Rikkert Veldhuizen; Jordy Mol	Germany; Caio Lauxtermann; Fabian Vogel
Tumbling	Kaden Brown; United States	Tofig Aliyev; Azerbaijan	Fred Teague; Great Britain

=== Women ===
Event	Gold	Silver	Bronze
Double Mini	Diana Gago; Portugal	Grace Harder; United States	Melania Rodríguez; Spain
Synchronized	China; Xu Yicheng; Zhang Xinxin	Japan; Saki Tanaka; Hikaru Mori	Canada; Sarah Milette; Sophiane Méthot
Tumbling	Megan Kealy; Great Britain	Candy Brière-Vetillard; France	Alexandra Efraimoglou; Greece
