= 2018 European Trampoline Championships =

2018 European Championships
- Location: Baku, Azerbaijan
- Dates: 12 April to 15 April 2018

The 26th Trampoline European Championships took place in Baku, Azerbaijan, from April 12 – April 15, 2018.

== Medal summary ==
=== Seniors ===
Event	Gold	Silver	Bronze
Men
Individual Trampoline	Diogo Ganchinho (POR)	Mikita Ilyinykh (BLR)	Allan Morante (FRA)
Synchro	Belarus; Aleh Rabtsau; Uladzislau Hancharou	Russia; Sergey Azaryan; Mikhail Melnik	France; Pierre Gouzou; Josuah Faroux
Trampoline Team	Belarus; Uladzislau Hancharou; Aleh Rabtsau; Artsiom Zhuk; Mikita Ilyinykh	Russia; Dmitry Ushakov; Sergey Azaryan; Mikhail Melnik; Dmitriy Zenkin	Ukraine; Anton Davydenko; Mykola Prostorov; Dmytro Sobakar; Artem Savchenko
Double Mini	Vasiliy Makarskiy (RUS)	Jonas Nordfors (SWE)	Diogo Carvalho Costa (POR)
Double Mini Team	Russia; Mikhail Zalomin; Vasiliy Makarskiy; Aleksandr Odintsov; Vitaly Krivonos	Portugal; Diogo Carvalho Costa; Tiago Sampaio Romao; Joao Caeiro; Luis Afonso	Spain; Alejandro Bernardez; Hugo Martin; Alejandro Cid; Daniel Pérez
Tumbling	Mikhail Malkin (AZE)	Rasmus Steffensen (DEN)	Vadim Afanasev (RUS)
Tumbling Team	Russia; Vadim Afanasev; Grigory Noskov; Aleksandr Lisitsyn; Maxim Shlyakin	Great Britain; Kristof Willerton; Elliott Browne; Greg Townley; Kallum Mulhall	Denmark; Rasmus Steffensen; Anders Wesch; David Erbs; Adam Matthiesen
Women
Individual Trampoline	Yana Pavlova (RUS)	Hanna Hancharova (BLR)	Kat Driscoll (GBR)
Synchro	Belarus; Maryia Makharynskaya; Hanna Hancharova	Azerbaijan; Veronika Zemlianaia; Sviatlana Makshtarova	Ukraine; Svitlana Malkova; Nataliia Moskvina
Trampoline Team	Belarus; Hanna Hancharova; Anhelina Khatsian; Valiantsina Bahamolava; Maryia Makharynskaya	France; Marine Jurbert; Léa Labrousse; Anaïs Brèche	Portugal; Ana Rente; Beatriz Martins; Mariana Carvalho; Catarina Nunes
Double Mini	Kirsty Way (GBR)	Polina Troyanova (RUS)	Lina Sjöberg (SWE)
Double Mini Team	Russia; Polina Troyanova; Dana Sadkova; Sofya Bogdanova; Daria Solkina	Great Britain; Kirsty Way; Ruth Shevelan; Phoebe Williams; Caitlin O'Brien	Portugal; Mafalda Bras; Ines Martins; Sara Sousa
Tumbling	Lucie Colebeck (GBR)	Megan Kealy (GBR)	Viktoriia Danilenko (RUS)
Tumbling Team	Great Britain; Lucie Colebeck; Megan Kealy; Rachel Davies; Shanice Davidson	Russia; Viktoriia Danilenko; Anna Korobeynikova; Elena Krasnokutskaya; Natalia Parakhina	France; Léa Callon; Marie Deloge; Lauriane Lamperim; Emilie Wambote

=== Juniors ===
Event	Gold	Silver	Bronze
Men
Individual Trampoline	Ivan Litvinovich (BLR)	Corey Walkes (GBR)	Andrew Stamp (GBR)
Synchro	Belarus; Sebastsyan Stankevich; Andrei Builou	Portugal; Goncalo Martins; Ruben Tavares	Netherlands; Michael Abrahams; Luuk Swinkels
Trampoline Team	Belarus; Mikita Fomchanka; Ivan Litvinovich; Sebastsyan Stankevich; Daniil Valyntsau	Great Britain; Peter Buravytskiy; Zak Perzamanos; Andrew Stamp; Corey Walkes	Russia; Igor Baykov; Dimitrii Login; Roman Neudachin; Denis Smirnov
Double Mini	Ryan Devine (GBR)	Timofei Lazutin (RUS)	Henrique Moreira (POR)
Double Mini Team	Russia; Ivan Akimtsev; Egor Glushenko; Mikhail Iurev; Timofei Lazutin	Spain; Acoran de la Santa Cruz; David Franco; Andrés Martínez; Robert Vilarasau	Portugal; Joao Felix; Diogo Fernandes; Henrique Moreira; Lucas Santos
Tumbling	Jaydon Paddock (GBR)	Diogo Vilela (POR)	Arsenii Stepanian (RUS)
Tumbling Team	Great Britain; William Cowen; William Finn; Jack Leahy; Jaydon Paddock	Russia; Evgenii Miakishev; Egor Seleznev; Igor Shikunov; Arsenii Stepanian	Ukraine; Ivan Chupryna; Mykhailo Lesyshyn; Oleh Mazuryk; Bohdan Semashkin
Women
Individual Trampoline	Katsiaryna Yarshova (BLR)	Aliaksandra Staliarova (BLR)	Anastasia Papadimitriou (GRE)
Synchro	Belarus; Katsiaryna Yarshova; Aliaksandra Staliarova	Russia; Iana Lebedeva; Vera Beliankina	France; Zelie Riou; Clea Brousse
Trampoline Team	Russia; Vera Beliankina; Anzhela Bladtceva; Aleksandra Bonartseva; Iana Lebedeva	Belarus; Viktoryia Kuidan; Zlata Shalkouskaya; Aliaksandra Staliarova; Katsiaryna Yarshova	Greece; Angeliki Kalpaxi; Anastasia Papadimitriou; Antonia Sakellaridou; Lydia Sofia Tsakalidou
Double Mini	Melania Rodríguez (ESP)	Aleksandra Bonartseva (RUS)	Sara Guido (POR)
Double Mini Team	Russia; Galina Begim; Aleksandra Bonartseva; Elizaveta Galtsova; Daria Nespanova	Portugal; Ana Campos Oliveira; Maria Carvalho; Diana Gago; Sara Guido	Spain; Ingrid Caballero Barahona; Aintzane Dapena; Andrea Martinez; Melania Rodríguez
Tumbling	Diana Bratkova (RUS)	Jessica Brain (GBR)	Kaitlin Lafferty (GBR)
Tumbling Team	Great Britain; Aimee Antonius; Jessica Brain; Kaitlin Lafferty; Saskia Servini	Russia; Diana Bratkova; Polina Dorokhova; Ekaterina Kuznetsova; Elina Stepanova	France; Candy Brière-Vetillard; Sophie Mallet; Manon Morancais; Lucie Tumoine

== Medal table ==
* Host nation (Azerbaijan)

Rank	Nation	Gold	Silver	Bronze	Total
1	Russia (RUS)	5	4	2	11
2	Belarus (BLR)	4	2	0	6
3	Great Britain (GBR)	3	3	1	7
4	Portugal (POR)	1	1	3	5
5	Azerbaijan (AZE)	1	1	0	2
6	France (FRA)	0	1	3	4
7	Denmark (DEN)	0	1	1	2
7	Sweden (SWE)	0	1	1	2
9	Ukraine (UKR)	0	0	2	2
10	Spain (SPA)	0	0	1	1
Totals (10 entries)		14	14	14	42
