= Trampoline gymnastics at the 2025 World Games – Men's double mini =

Men's double mini at the 2025 World Games
- Venue: Dong'an Lake Sports Park Gymnasium, Chengdu, China
- Date: 9 August
- Competitors: 8 from 8 nations

Medalists
| 1st place, gold medalist(s) | | Brent Deklerck | Belgium |
| 2nd place, silver medalist(s) | | Omo Aikeremiokha | Great Britain |
| 3rd place, bronze medalist(s) | | Gavin Dodd | Canada |

The men's double mini competition at the 2025 World Games took place on 9 August at the Dong'an Lake Sports Park Gymnasium in Chengdu, China.

== Competition format ==
The top 4 gymnasts in qualifications, based on the best score between the two exercises, advanced to the semifinal. At the semifinals, the teams are divided in two groups. The best score of each group advances to the gold medal final.

== Results ==
=== Qualification ===
The results were a follows:

=== Preliminary ===
| Rank | Gymnast | D Score | E Score | Penalty | Score | Total | Notes |
|---|---|---|---|---|---|---|---|
| 1 | Gavin Dodd (CAN) | 10.000 | 19.200 | | 29.200 | 58.000 | Q |
| 1 | Gavin Dodd (CAN) | 10.800 | 18.600 | −0.600 | 28.800 | 58.000 | Q |
| 2 | Troy Sitkowski (AUS) | 10.000 | 18.200 | −0.200 | 28.000 | 56.000 | Q |
| 2 | Troy Sitkowski (AUS) | 9.600 | 18.400 | | 28.000 | 56.000 | Q |
| 3 | Brent Deklerck (BEL) | 8.700 | 18.400 | | 26.500 | 55.900 | Q |
| 3 | Brent Deklerck (BEL) | 5.100 | 17.200 | | 22.300 | 55.900 | Q |
| 4 | Omo Aikeremiokha (GBR) | 10.400 | 18.600 | −0.600 | 28.400 | 54.200 | Q |
| 4 | Omo Aikeremiokha (GBR) | 8.700 | 18.100 | −1.000 | 25.800 | 54.200 | Q |
| 5 | Ruben Padilla (USA) | 5.900 | 15.200 | | 21.100 | 52.600 | Q |
| 5 | Ruben Padilla (USA) | 13.100 | 19.000 | −0.600 | 31.500 | 52.600 | Q |
| 6 | Carlos del Ser (ESP) | 10.300 | 18.400 | −0.600 | 28.100 | 49.400 | Q |
| 6 | Carlos del Ser (ESP) | 5.900 | 15.400 | | 21.300 | 49.400 | Q |
| 7 | Diogo Cabral (POR) | 10.000 | 18.300 | −0.800 | 27.500 | 47.800 | Q |
| 7 | Diogo Cabral (POR) | 5.100 | 15.200 | | 20.300 | 47.800 | Q |
| 8 | Santiago Ferrari (ARG) | 7.600 | 19.200 | | 26.800 | 47.100 | Q |
| 8 | Santiago Ferrari (ARG) | 5.100 | 15.200 | | 20.300 | 47.100 | Q |

=== Semifinal ===
The results were as follows:

| Gymnast | Group | Difficulty | Execution | Penalty | Total |
| Gymnast | Group | Score | Score | Score | Total |
|---|---|---|---|---|---|
| Omo Aikeremiokha; Great Britain | 1 | 12.400 | 18.600 | –0.600 | 30.400 |
| Gavin Dodd; Canada | 1 | 10.000 | 19.200 | –0.600 | 28.600 |
| Brent Deklerck; Belgium | 2 | 10.000 | 18.600 | | 28.600 |
| Troy Sitkowski; Australia | 2 | 10.000 | 18.700 | –0.600 | 28.100 |

=== Final ===
The results were as follows:

| Rank | Gymnast | Difficulty | Execution | Penalty | Total |
| Rank | Gymnast | Score | Score | Score | Total |
Gold Medal Final
| 1st place, gold medalist(s) | Brent Deklerck (BEL) | 8.400 | 19.000 | –0.600 | 26.800 |
| 2nd place, silver medalist(s) | Omo Aikeremiokha (GBR) | 8.300 | 19.600 | –1.000 | 25.900 |
Bronze Medal Final
| 3rd place, bronze medalist(s) | Gavin Dodd (CAN) | 10.800 | 18.800 | –0.600 | 29.000 |
| 4 | Troy Sitkowski (AUS) | 9.600 | 17.900 | –1.000 | 26.500 |
