= 2021 Trampoline Gymnastics World Age Group Competitions =

International gymnastics competition

2021 Trampoline Gymnastics World Age Group Competitions at the
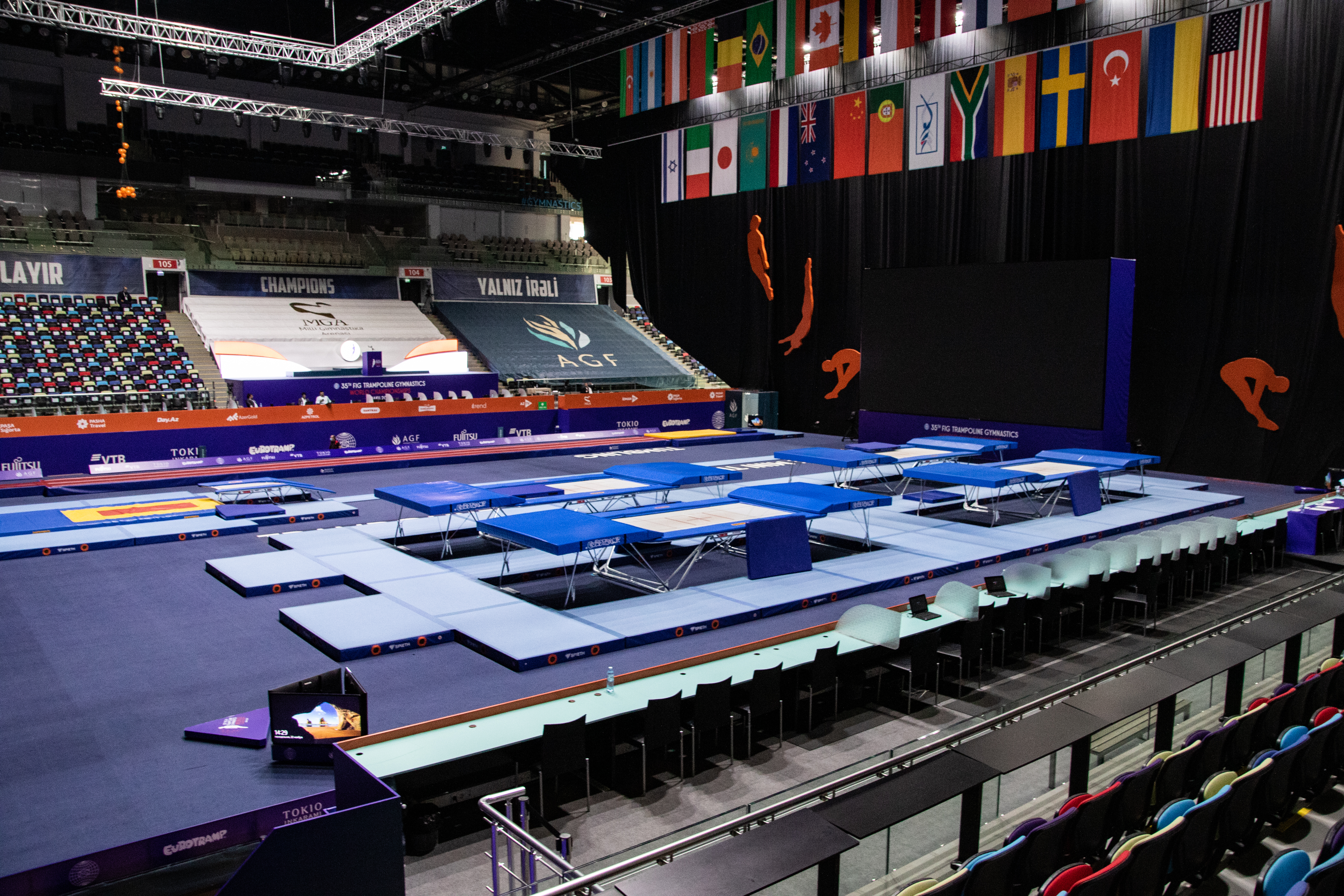
- Venue: National Gymnastics Arena
- Location: Baku, Azerbaijan
- Dates: November 25–28
- Competitors: 669 from 32 nations

The 2021 Trampoline Gymnastics World Age Group Competitions were held from November 25 to 28, 2021, in the National Gymnastics Arena in Baku, Azerbaijan, with 669 competitors aged 11 to 21 from 32 countries. The event was held one week after the 2021 Trampoline Gymnastics World Championships in the same venue.

== Participating nations ==
- Azerbaijan (16)
- Belarus (16)
- Belgium (34)
- Brazil (15)
- Bulgaria (21)
- Canada (9)
- Czech Republic (10)
- Denmark (15)
- Spain (11)
- Estonia (3)
- Finland (8)
- France (30)
- Georgia (7)
- Germany (24)
- Great Britain (53)
- Greece (3)
- Israel (30)
- Italy (10)
- Japan (22)
- Kazakhstan (16)
- Latvia (2)
- Netherlands (27)
- Poland (7)
- Portugal (78)
- Russia (80)
- Romania (1)
- South Africa (3)
- Spain (14)
- Switzerland (13)
- Sweden (14)
- Turkey (7)
- Ukraine (22)
- United States (48)

(Number of competitors in brackets)

== Disciplines ==
The four disciplines of the championship are:

- Trampolining (individual)
- Synchronized trampolining
- Tumbling
- Double mini trampoline

In each discipline, events were held for male and female competitors and the four age groups 11–12, 13–14, 15-16 and 17–21, for a total of 32 events.

== Medal table ==
* Host nation (Azerbaijan)

Rank	Nation	Gold	Silver	Bronze	Total
1	Russia	19	13	7	39
2	United States	3	4	5	12
3	Belarus	2	3	4	9
4	Kazakhstan	2	0	0	2
5	Great Britain	1	3	6	10
6	Japan	1	3	3	7
7	France	1	1	0	2
8	Belgium	1	0	1	2
8	Portugal	1	0	1	2
10	Azerbaijan*	1	0	0	1
11	Denmark	0	3	0	3
12	Georgia	0	1	0	1
12	Spain	0	1	0	1
14	Germany	0	0	3	3
15	Bulgaria	0	0	1	1
15	Greece	0	0	1	1
Totals (16 entries)		32	32	32	96
