= Great Britain at the 2025 World Games =

- IOC code: GBR
- NOC: British Olympic Committee

in Chengdu, China 7 August 2025 – 17 August 2025
- Medals Ranked 22nd: Gold 4 Silver 2 Bronze 4 Total 10

World Games appearances
- 1981; 1985; 1989; 1993; 1997; 2001; 2005; 2009; 2013; 2017; 2022; 2025

Great Britain competed at the 2025 World Games held in Chengdu, China from 7 to 17 August 2025.

Athletes representing Great Britain won four gold medals, two silver medals and four bronze medals. The country finished in 22nd place in the medal table.

== Medal table ==
Nation	Gold	Silver	Bronze	Total
Great Britain	4	2	3	9

== Medallists ==
Medal	Name	Sport	Event	Date
Gold	Joe Birch; Dan Kenny; Will Lee; Pye Murphy; Dan Nicholls; Leeboy Robinson; Jack Routley; Gaz Shaw	Tug of war	Men's outdoor 640 kg	9 August
Gold	Megan Kealy	Trampoline gymnastics	Women's tumbling	9 August
Gold	Evelyn Neyens	Kickboxing	Women's point fighting 60 kg	14 August
Gold	Jurins Kengamu	Powerlifting	Men's middleweight	14 August
Silver	Omo Aikeremiokha	Trampoline gymnastics	Men's double mini trampoline	9 August
Silver	Patrick Huston	Archery	Men's recurve	13 August
Bronze	Louis Alexander; Rex Booth; Samuel Ditchburn; Freddie Turner	Acrobatic gymnastics	Men's group	10 August
Bronze	Fred Teague	Trampoline gymnastics	Men's tumbling	10 August
Bronze	Joy Nnamani	Powerlifting	Men's middleweight	14 August
Bronze	Kartik McCutcheon; Suryan McCutcheon; Caleb Bowden; Alex Lowthorpe; Angus Boyle; Shivan McCutcheon; Fergal McConvey; Santanam McCutcheon	Canoe polo	Men's tournament	16 August

Medals by sport
Sport	1st place, gold medalist(s)	2nd place, silver medalist(s)	3rd place, bronze medalist(s)	Total
Trampoline gymnastics	1	1	1	3
Powerlifting	1	0	1	2
Kickboxing	1	0	0	1
Tug of war	1	0	0	1
Archery	0	1	0	1
Acrobatic gymnastics	0	0	1	1
Canoe polo	0	0	1	1
Total	4	2	4	10

== Flag football ==
Women

Team	Event	Group play				Quarterfinals	Semifinal	Final / BM	
Team	Event	Opposition Result	Opposition Result	Opposition Result	Rank	Opposition Result	Opposition Result	Opposition Result	Rank
Great Britain women	Women's tournament	Italy; W 26–13	Japan; W 26–24	Mexico; L 13–34	2	Austria; L 28–40	Consolation semifinalsItaly; W 28–35	5th place gameChina; W 34–13	5

== Powerlifting ==
Classic

Athlete	Event	Exercises			Total weight	Total points	Rank
Athlete	Event	Squat	Bench press	Deadlift	Total weight	Total points	Rank
Jurins Kengamu	Men's Middleweight	317.5	195.0	360.0	872.5	120.90	1st place, gold medalist(s)
Christian Ayandokun	Men's Heavyweight	322.5	210.0	360.0	892.5	113.42	4
Ziana Azariah	Women's Super heavyweight	225.0	122.5	270.0	617.5	114.29	5
Joy Chinonso Nnamani	Women's Middleweight	185.0	102.5	240.0 WR	527.5	118.72	3rd place, bronze medalist(s)
Bobbie Butters	Women's Middleweight	190.0	115.0	197.5	502.5	116.94	5
Annie Nelson	Women's Heavyweight	195.0	120.0	217.5	532.5	108.86	6
