= Trampoline gymnastics at the 2022 World Games – Men's double mini-trampoline =

Men's double-mini trampoline at the 2022 World Games
- Venue: University of Alabama Birmingham, Birmingham, United States
- Date: 15 July 2022
- Competitors: 10 from 10 nations

Medalists
gold medal
silver medal
bronze medal

The men's double-mini trampoline competition in trampoline gymnastics at the 2022 World Games took place on 15 July 2022 at the University of Alabama Birmingham in Birmingham, United States.

== Competition format ==
A total of 10 athletes entered the competition. Best 8 athletes from preliminary advances to the final.

== Results ==
=== Preliminary ===
Rank	Gymnast	D Score	E Score	Penalty	Score	Total	Notes
1	(United States) Ruben Padilla	11.600	18.800		30.040	61.000	Q
1	(United States) Ruben Padilla	11.600	19.000		30.600	61.000	Q
2	(Germany) Daniel Schmidt	9.200	19.100		28.300	54.500	Q
2	(Germany) Daniel Schmidt	8.000	18.800	−0.600	26.200	54.500	Q
3	(United Kingdom) Omo Aikeremiokha	8.700	18.400		26.500	50.800	Q
3	(United Kingdom) Omo Aikeremiokha	5.100	17.200		22.300	50.800	Q
4	(Japan) Ryohei Taniguchi	10.000	18.500		28.500	50.400	Q
4	(Japan) Ryohei Taniguchi	5.600	18.300		23.900	50.400	Q
5	(Canada) Kieran Lupish	9.200	18.600		7.800	50.100	Q
5	(Canada) Kieran Lupish	4.800	17.500		22.300	50.100	Q
6	(Spain) David Franco	9.600	18.800	−0.600	27.800	50.800	Q
6	(Spain) David Franco	4.800	17.400		22.200	50.800	Q
7	(Portugal) Tiago Sampaio Romao	9.200	18.400	−0.600	27.000	49.400	Q
7	(Portugal) Tiago Sampaio Romao	5.100	17.300		22.400	49.400	Q
8	(Sweden) Jonas Nordfors	4.000	17.500		21.500	47.300	Q
8	(Sweden) Jonas Nordfors	8.100	18.500	−0.800	25.800	47.300	Q
9	(Argentina) Federico Cury	8.400	18.600	−0.600	26.4000	26.400	R1
9	(Argentina) Federico Cury	0.000	0.000		0.000	26.400	R1
10	(Netherlands) Michael Abrahams	0.000	0.000		0.000	23.2000	R2
10	(Netherlands) Michael Abrahams	5.200	18.000		23.2000	23.2000	R2

=== Final ===
Rank	Gymnast	D Score	E Score	Penalty	Score	Total
