= Noemí Romero Rosario =

Spanish trampoline gymnast (born 2000)

- Born: 4 October 2000 (age 25) Madrid, Spain

Gymnastics career
- Discipline: Trampoline gymnastics
- Country represented: Spain
- Club: Club Trampolin Albacete
Medal record
Women's trampoline gymnastics
Representing Spain
European Championships
Gold medal – first place	2022 Rimini	Individual team
Bronze medal – third place	2024 Guimarães	Individual

Noemí Romero Rosario (born 4 October 2000) is a Spanish trampoline gymnast. She won a gold medal in the team event at the 2022 European Championships. She also won a bronze medal in the individual event at the 2024 European Championships. She represented Spain at the 2024 Summer Olympics where she was the first reserve for the individual final.

== Gymnastics career ==
Romero began trampoline gymnastics when she was six years old.

Romero became the Spanish national trampoline champion in 2018. That year, she competed at her first senior-level World Championships, finishing 48th and 10th in the individual and synchronized qualification rounds, respectively.

Romero and Marina Chavarría qualified for the synchro final at the 2019 Valladolid World Cup, finishing seventh. Then at the 2019 World Championships, she advanced to the individual semi-finals and placed twelfth. Romero and Chavarría finished sixth in the synchro final at the 2021 Anadia World Cup. She once again advanced to the individual semi-finals at the 2021 World Championships, finishing 15th.

Romero won a gold medal with the Spanish team at the 2022 European Championships. This marked the first time Spain won a European gold medal in trampoline gymnastics. She then competed at the 2022 World Championships but did not advance past the individual qualification round where she placed 50th.

Romero finished eleventh at the 2023 Coimbra World Cup and then eighth at the Varna World Cup. Then at the 2023 World Championships, she finished 22nd in the individual semi-final. Additionally, the Spanish team finished fourth.

Romero won the individual bronze medal at the 2024 European Championships, behind Bryony Page and Léa Labrousse. Additionally, she placed fifth in the synchro event with Erica Sanz Ginés. She qualified to represent Spain at the 2024 Summer Olympics with her results in the 2024 FIG World Cup series. Along with David Vega, she became the first Spanish trampoline gymnast to compete at the Olympic Games since the sport's debut in 2000. There, she finished in ninth place in the qualification round, making her the first reserve for the final.

== Personal life ==
As of 2024, Romero is in a relationship with fellow Spanish trampoline gymnast David Vega.
