= Molly McKenna =

British trampoline gymnast (born 2006)

Personal information
- Born: 2006 (age 19–20) Northern Ireland, United Kingdom

Sport
- Sport: Trampolining
Medal record
Women's Double mini trampoline
Representing United Kingdom
World Championships
Silver medal – second place	2025 Pamplona	Double Mini Team
Bronze medal – third place	2026 Nanjing	Double Mini Team

Molly McKenna (born 2006) is a British athlete who competes in trampoline gymnastics.

McKenna comes from Randalstown in County Antrim.

In November 2022 McKenna won the world title in Bulgaria.

Since joining the Team GB DMT Senior Squad, McKenna has secured Senior Team Women's DMT Gold at the World Championships in Birmingham, November 2023 and Senior Team Women's DMT Silver at the European Championships in Guimarães, Portugal in April 2024.

McKenna is Senior Women's British DMT Champion 2024.

== Awards ==
Junior British Championship
Year	Place	Medal	Event
2022	Birmingham (UK)	Gold	Double Mini Individual

Junior Northern Ireland Championship
Year	Place	Medal	Event
2022	Newtownards (NI)	Gold	Double Mini Individual

Junior European Championship
Year	Place	Medal	Event
2022	Rimini (Italy)	Gold	Double Mini Individual

Junior World Championship
Year	Place	Medal	Event
2022	Sofia (Bulgaria)	Gold	Double Mini Individual

Senior World Championship
Year	Place	Medal	Event
2023	Birmingham (UK)	Gold	Double Mini Team
Senior European Championship
Year	Place	Medal	Event
2024	Guimarães (Portugal)	Silver	Double Mini Team

Senior Northern Ireland Championship
Year	Place	Medal	Event
2024	Newtownards (NI)	Gold	Double Mini Individual

Senior British Championship
Year	Place	Medal	Event
2024	Birmingham (UK)	Gold	Double Mini Individual
