= Gabriel Albuquerque =

Portuguese trampoline gymnast (born 2006)

- Born: 9 April 2006 (age 20) Campo Grande, Lisbon, Portugal

Gymnastics career
- Discipline: Trampoline gymnastics
- Country represented: Portugal
- Head coach: João Monteiro
Medal record
Men's trampoline gymnastics
Representing Portugal
World Championships
Bronze medal – third place	2025 Pamplona	Individual team
Bronze medal – third place	2026 Nanjing	All-around team
World Games
Gold medal – first place	2025 Chengdu	Synchro
European Championships
Silver medal – second place	2026 Portimão	Individual
Bronze medal – third place	2024 Guimarães	Synchro
Bronze medal – third place	2026 Portimão	Individual team
FIG World Cup
Event	1st	2nd	3rd
Synchro	0	1	0
Total	0	1	0

Gabriel Albuquerque (born 9 April 2006) is a Portuguese trampoline gymnast. He won a bronze medal in synchronized trampoline at the 2024 European Championships.

== Career ==
=== Junior ===
Albuquerque finished eighth in the double mini trampoline final at the 2017 World Age Group Competitions, and he placed eighth in individual trampoline at the 2018 World Age Group Competitions. He won the gold medal in the individual event at the 2019 World Age Group Competitions in Tokyo, becoming the first Portuguese trampoline gymnast to achieve this distinction. At the 2021 European Championships, he won a silver medal with the Portuguese junior trampoline team. He won the individual event among 15–16 year olds at the 2021 World Age Group Competitions. In 2022, he won his third consecutive World Age Group Competitions individual title. He also won a silver medal in the synchronized event with partner Sergio Aniceto.

=== Senior ===
Albuquerque began competing in senior competitions in 2023. At the 2023 Santarem World Cup, he placed eighth in the individual final and fifth in the synchronized event with his partner Lucas Santos. Then at the Coimbra World Cup, he placed fourth with Santos and seventh as an individual. At the Palm Beach World Cup, he placed eighth as an individual. He won a silver medal with Santos at the 2023 Varna World Cup. He placed fourth in the individual event at the 2023 World Championships and secured his country a berth for the 2024 Summer Olympics. Additional, the Portuguese men's trampoline team finished fourth in the team competition.

Albuquerque placed seventh in the 2024 Baku World Cup and sixth at the Cottbus World Cup in the individual event. Following these result, he was officially selected to represent Portugal at the 2024 Summer Olympics. He then won a bronze medal with synchro partner Lucas Santos at the 2024 European Championships.

Albuquerque won a bronze medal in the trampoline team event at the 2025 World Championships.
