= Brana =

Brana or Braña may refer to:

== People ==
- Alejandra Braña (born 2004), Spanish gymnast
- Frank Braña (1934–2012), Spanish film actor
- Rodrigo Braña (born 1979), Argentine footballer
- Brana Dane (born 1996), American model and activist

=== Fictional ===
- Isabella Braña, fictional character from The Young and the Restless

== Other ==
- Brana (mountain), a mountain in the Kamnik Alps
- Brana (moth), a genus of moths of the family Noctuidae
- Brana River, a river in Romania
- La Braña, a parish in Spain
- Braña, is the name that in the Cantabrian Mountains range receives the mountain area where the cattle take advantage of the late grasses in summer time.

== See also ==
- Branná, a village and municipality in Šumperk District, Olomouc Region, Czech Republic
