= Zhang Xinxin (gymnast) =

Chinese athlete (born 2004)

- 张欣欣
- Born: 13 June 2004 (age 22) Henan, China

Gymnastics career
- Discipline: Trampoline gymnastics
- Country represented: China
- Club: Shanxi Province
- Head coach: Tian Shufan
Medal record
Trampoline gymnastics
Representing China
World Games
Gold medal – first place	2025 Chengdu	Synchronized
World Championships
Gold medal – first place	2021 Baku	Synchronized
Gold medal – first place	2025 Pamplona	All-around team
Gold medal – first place	2026 Nanjing	Individual team
Silver medal – second place	2026 Nanjing	All-around team
Bronze medal – third place	2025 Pamplona	Synchronized

Zhang Xinxin (Chinese: 张欣欣; pinyin: Zhāng Xīnxīn; born 13 June 2004) is a Chinese trampoline gymnast. In synchronized trampoline, she is a 2025 World Games champion and a 2021 World Championships champion.

== Gymnastics career ==
Zhang won the individual silver medal at the 2019 World Age Group Competitions in the 15–16 year old age group. She competed with Hu Yicheng in the synchronized event at the 2021 World Championships in Baku, and they won the gold medal after also being the top scorers in the qualifications. The pair then finished fourth at the 2022 World Championships.

Zhang competed with Cao Yunzhu in the synchronized event at the 2024 Baku World Cup, and they won the silver medal. They then won the gold medal at the 2024 Cottbus World Cup. She then won her first individual FIG World Cup medal, a bronze, at the 2024 Arosa World Cup. There, she also won another synchronized competition with Cao. They won again at the Coimbra World Cup and were the overall synchronized winners of the 2024 FIG World Cup series.

Zhang began competing with Hu again during the 2025 season, and they won the gold medal at the Riccione World Cup. They won again at the 2025 Coimbra World Cup. They then won the synchronized gold medal at the 2025 World Games after being the only pair to complete all four routines without a major mistake. She then helped the Shanxi provincial team win gold at the 2025 National Games of China. At the 2025 World Championships, she won a bronze medal alongside Hu in the synchronized competition. Additionally, she helped China win the gold medal in the all-around team event. She also competed in the mixed synchronized event with Wang Dong but did not advance beyond the qualification round.
