= David Franco =

David Franco may refer to:

- Dave Franco, American actor and filmmaker
- David Franco (gymnast), Spanish trampoline gymnast

== See also ==
- David Franco Mendes, Dutch-Jewish Hebrew-language poet
