= David Vega (gymnast) =

Spanish trampoline gymnast

- Born: 4 August 1998 (age 28) Barcelona, Spain

Gymnastics career
- Discipline: Trampoline gymnastics
- Country represented: Spain
- Club: Associacio Sant Marti Esport
- Head coach: Guillermo Villa
Medal record
Men's trampoline gymnastics
Representing Spain
World Championships
| Silver medal – second place | 2023 Birmingham | Individual team |
European Championships
| Bronze medal – third place | 2024 Guimarães | Individual team |

David Vega (born 4 August 1998) is a Spanish trampoline gymnast. He won a silver medal at the 2023 World Championships and a bronze medal at the 2024 European Championships with the Spanish men's trampoline team.

== Early life ==
Vega was born on 4 August 1998 in Barcelona. He began trampoline gymnastics at age nine after watching his cousin compete.

== Career ==
Vega competed at his first World Championships in 2015, finishing 109th in the qualification round. He placed seventh with Jorge Martin in synchronized trampoline at the 2017 Valladolid World Cup. Then at the 2017 World Championships, he finished 82nd in the individual qualification round. He placed 81st at the 2018 World Championships and improved to 43rd at the 2019 World Championships.

Vega finished 17th at the 2021 Anadia World Cup. Then at the 2021 World Championships, he placed 16th in the semifinal. He also placed 16th in the semifinal at the 2022 World Championships. He won a silver medal with the Spanish men's trampoline team at the 2023 World Championships. Additionally, he placed 21st in the individual semifinal round.

Vega placed 17th at the 2024 Cottbus World Cup. At the 2024 Arosa World Cup, he qualified for his first individual World Cup final and placed seventh. He won a bronze medal with the Spanish men's trampoline team at the 2024 European Championships, and he finished 19th in the individual semifinal.

Vega qualified to represent Spain at the 2024 Summer Olympics through his results on the 2023–24 World Cup series. Along with Noemi Romero Rosario, they will be the first Spanish trampoline gymnasts to compete at the Olympic Games since the sport's debut in 2000.

== Personal life ==
As of 2024, Vega is in a relationship with fellow Spanish trampoline gymnast Noemi Romero Rosario.
