= Trampoline gymnastics at the 2022 World Games =

- Venue: University of Alabama Birmingham
- Dates: 15–17 July 2022
- No. of events: 4

The trampoline gymnastics competition at the 2022 World Games took place in July 2022, in Birmingham in United States, at the University of Alabama Birmingham. Originally scheduled to take place in July 2021, the Games were rescheduled for July 2022 as a result of the 2020 Summer Olympics postponement due to the COVID-19 pandemic. It served as a qualifying event for the 2024 Summer Olympics in Paris, France.

== Medal table ==
* Host nation (United States)

Rank	Nation	Gold	Silver	Bronze	Total
1	Spain	2	0	0	2
2	France	1	1	0	2
2	United States*	1	1	0	2
4	Germany	0	1	0	1
4	New Zealand	0	1	0	1
6	Australia	0	0	1	1
6	Denmark	0	0	1	1
6	Japan	0	0	1	1
6	Sweden	0	0	1	1
Totals (9 entries)		4	4	4	12

== Medalists ==
=== Men ===
Event	Gold	Silver	Bronze
Double mini-trampoline	David Franco; Spain	Daniel Schmidt; Germany	Ryohei Taniguchi; Japan
Tumbling	Kaden Brown; United States	Axel Duriez; France	Rasmus Steffensen; Denmark

=== Women ===
Event	Gold	Silver	Bronze
Double mini-trampoline	Melania Rodriguez; Spain	Bronwyn Dibb; New Zealand	Lina Sjöberg; Sweden
Tumbling	Candy Brière-Vetillard; France	Miah Bruns; United States	Breanah Cauchi; Australia
