= Tiago Sampaio Romão =

Portuguese trampoline gymnast (born 1999)

- Born: 25 February 1999 (age 27) Portugal

Gymnastics career
- Discipline: Trampoline gymnastics
- Country represented: Portugal
Medal record
Representing Portugal
World Championships
Silver medal – second place	2023 Birmingham	Team All-around
Silver medal – second place	2021 Baku	Double Mini Team
Bronze medal – third place	2023 Birmingham	Double Mini
Bronze medal – third place	2019 Tokyo	Double Mini Team
European Championships
Gold medal – first place	2024 Guimarães	Double Mini
Silver medal – second place	2024 Guimarães	Double Mini Team
Silver medal – second place	2021 Sochi	Double Mini
Silver medal – second place	2021 Sochi	Double Mini Team
Silver medal – second place	2018 Baku	Double Mini Team
FIG World Cup
Event	1st	2nd	3rd
Double Mini	1	0	1
Total	1	0	1
Junior European Championships
Gold medal – first place	2016 Valladolid	Double Mini
Gold medal – first place	2014 Guimarães	Double Mini
Bronze medal – third place	2016 Valladolid	Double Mini Team
World Age Group Competitions
Gold medal – first place	2013 Sofia	Double Mini (13-14)
Silver medal – second place	2015 Odense	Double Mini (15-16)
Silver medal – second place	2011 Birmingham	Double Mini (11-12)
Bronze medal – third place	2010 Metz	Double Mini (11-12)

Tiago Sampaio Romão (born 1999) is a Portuguese athlete who competes in trampoline gymnastics. He has won medals at the European Trampoline Championships and the World Championships.

== Results ==
World Championship
Year	Place	Medal	Type
2019	Tokyo (Japan)	Bronze	Double Mini Team
2021	Baku (Azerbaijan)	Silver	Double Mini Team
2023	Birmingham (UK)	Bronze	Double Mini
2023	Birmingham (UK)	Silver	All-around Team
European Championship
Year	Place	Medal	Type
2018	Baku (Azerbaijan)	Silver	Double Mini Team
2021	Sochi (Russia)	Silver	Double Mini
2021	Sochi (Russia)	Silver	Double Mini Team
2024	Guimarães (Portugal)	Silver	Double Mini Team
2024	Guimarães (Portugal)	Gold	Double Mini
