= Teona Dzhandzhgava =

Georgian gymnast (born 1997)

Personal information
- Native name: თეონა ჯანჯღავა
- Born: November 2, 1997 (age 27); Tbilisi, Georgia

Sport
- Sport: Trampolining

Teona Dzhandzhgava (Georgian: თეონა ჯანჯღავა; born 2 November 1997) is a Georgian athlete who competes in trampoline gymnastics.

She won a bronze medal at the 2023 Trampoline Gymnastics World Championships and two medals at the 2022 European Trampoline Championships.

== Awards ==
Trampoline Gymnastics World Championships
Year	Place	Medal	Event
2023	Birmingham (UK)	Bronze	Equipment
European Trampoline Championships
Year	Place	Medal	Event
2022	Rímini (Italy)	Silver	Equipment
2022	Rímini (Italy)	Bronze	Synchronized
