= Servini =

Servini or Servinis is a surname.

== List of people with the surname ==
- George Servinis (born 1963), Canadian ice hockey player
- María Romilda Servini (born 1936), Argentine lawyer and judge
- Saskia Servini (born 2001), British trampoline gymnast
