= Vilarasau (surname) =

Vilarasau is a surname. Notable people with the surname include:

- Emma Vilarasau (born 1959), Spanish actress
- Robert Vilarasau (born 2001), Spanish gymnast

== See also ==
- Vila Restal
