= 2024 European Trampoline Championships =

2024 European Championships
- Venue: Pavilhão Multiusos de Guimarães
- Location: Guimarães, Portugal
- Dates: 3 April to 7 April 2024
- Competitors: 232 from 28 nations (senior); 191 from 28 nations (junior)

The 2024 European Championships in Trampoline, Double-Mini Trampoline and Tumbling (29th Seniors and 27th Juniors) commonly referred to as the 2024 European Trampoline Championships, was held from 3 April to 7 April 2024 in Guimarães, Portugal.

== Participating nations ==
=== Senior ===
- Armenia (1)
- Austria (3)
- Azerbaijan (8)
- Belgium (10)
- Bulgaria (4)
- Czech Republic (10)
- Denmark (13)
- Spain (22)
- Estonia (2)
- Finland (5)
- France (15)
- Great Britain (21)
- Georgia (4)
- Germany (17)
- Greece (11)
- Ireland (5)
- Israel (3)
- Italy (5)
- Latvia (1)
- Netherlands (9)
- Poland (1)
- Portugal (25) (Host)
- Slovenia (1)
- Switzerland (2)
- Slovakia (1)
- Sweden (10)
- Turkey (6)
- Ukraine (17)

== Events ==
=== Senior ===
Event	Gold	Silver	Bronze
Men
Individual Trampoline	Pedro Ferreira (POR)	Pierre Gouzou (FRA)	Diogo Abreu (POR)
Synchro	Great Britain; Zak Perzamanos; Corey Walkes	France; Pierre Gouzou; Morgan Demiro-o-Domiro	Portugal; Gabriel Albuquerque; Lucas Santos
Trampoline Team	France; Allan Morante; Pierre Gouzou; Morgan Demiro-O-Domiro; Julian Chartier	Germany; Matthias Pfleiderer; Fabian Vogel; Caio Lauxtermann; Matthias Schuldt	Spain; David Franco; Robert Vilarasau; David Vega; Jorge Martín
Double Mini	Tiago Sampaio Romão (POR)	Andrés Martínez (ESP)	Brent Deklerck (BEL)
Double Mini Team	Spain; Carlos del Ser; Nuno Villafane; David Franco; Andrés Martínez	Portugal; Jose Domingues; Diogo Cabral; Tiago Sampaio Romao; Diogo Fernandes	Germany; Hannes Koenig; Daniel Schmidt; Adrian Thomson; Simon Dobler
Tumbling	Magnus Lindholmer (DEN)	Tofig Aliyev (AZE)	Kristof Willerton (GBR)
Tumbling Team	Azerbaijan; Bilal Gurbanov; Adil Hajizada; Tofig Aliyev; Mikhail Malkin	Great Britain; William Cowen; Fred Teague; Jaydon Paddock; Kristof Willerton	Portugal; Gonçalo Nunes; Paulo Marques; Diogo Gomes; Vasco Peso
Women
Individual Trampoline	Bryony Page (GBR)	Léa Labrousse (FRA)	Noemi Romero Rosario (ESP)
Synchro	Great Britain; Bryony Page; Isabelle Songhurst	France; Marine Jurbert; Léa Labrousse	Georgia; Anano Apakidze; Mariam Raguimovi
Trampoline Team	France; Léa Labrousse; Cléa Brousse; Laura Paris; Marine Prieur	Georgia; Mariam Ragimovi; Teona Janjgava; Anano Apakidze; Luba Golovina	Portugal; Ingrid Major; Catarina Marianito Nunes; Mariana Carvalho; Sofia Correia
Double Mini	Melania Rodríguez (ESP)	Diana Gago (POR)	Alexandra Garcia (POR)
Double Mini Team	Portugal; Matilde Oliveira; Alexandra Garcia; Diana Gago; Ines Martins	Great Britain; Kirsty Way; Ruth Shevelan; Bethany Williamson; Molly McKenna	Spain; Diana Sanz Ginés; Marta Lopez; Alejandra Braña; Melania Rodríguez
Tumbling	Alexandra Efraimoglu (GRE)	Mariana Cascalheira (POR)	Maëlle Dumitru-Marin (FRA)
Tumbling Team	Great Britain; Megan Kealy; Naana Oppon; Comfort Yeates; Saskia Servini	France; Candy Brière-Vetillard; Maëlle Dumitru-Marin; Manon Morançais; Emilie Wambote	Belgium; Evi Milh; Louise Van Regenmortel; Sara Neyrinck; Tachina Peeters

== Medals ==
=== Juniors ===
The British team claimed two junior titles, with Declan Carter, James Keenan and Alfie Lynch triumphant in the men's DMT team event. Alicia Field, Scarlet Parchment and Grace West are also celebrating after winning the women's tumbling team gold.

=== Seniors ===
* Host nation (Portugal)

Rank	Nation	Gold	Silver	Bronze	Total
1	Great Britain	4	2	1	7
2	Portugal*	3	3	5	11
3	France	2	5	1	8
4	Spain	2	1	3	6
5	Azerbaijan	1	1	0	2
6	Denmark	1	0	0	1
6	Greece	1	0	0	1
8	Georgia	0	1	1	2
8	Germany	0	1	1	2
10	Belgium	0	0	2	2
Totals (10 entries)		14	14	14	42

=== Total ===
* Host nation (Portugal)

Rank	Nation	Gold	Silver	Bronze	Total
1	Portugal*	19	4	9	32
2	Great Britain	8	5	12	25
3	France	2	6	3	11
4	Spain	2	2	3	7
5	Azerbaijan	2	2	0	4
6	Georgia	2	1	1	4
7	Netherlands	2	0	0	2
8	Belgium	1	1	2	4
9	Denmark	1	0	0	1
9	Greece	1	0	0	1
9	Turkey	1	0	0	1
12	Germany	0	2	3	5
13	Italy	0	2	0	2
14	Switzerland	0	1	0	1
15	Israel	0	0	1	1
15	Poland	0	0	1	1
Totals (16 entries)		41	26	35	102
