= Zak Perzamanos =

British trampoline gymnast (born 2003)

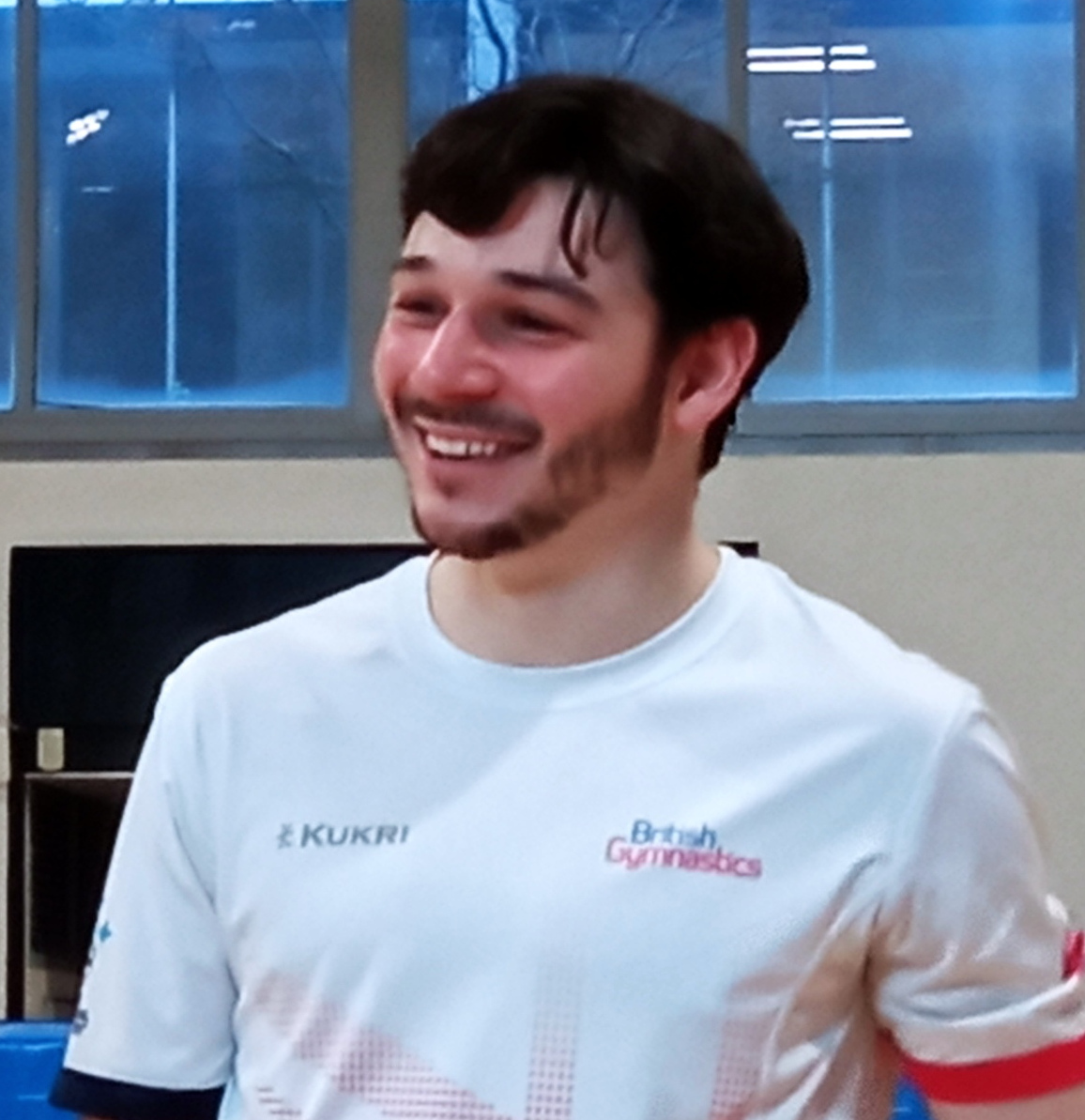
- Perzamanos in 2024

Personal information
- Born: 17 June 2003 (age 23) Liverpool, United Kingdom

Gymnastics career
- Discipline: Trampoline gymnastics
- Country represented: United Kingdom
- Club: Liverpool Trampoline Gymnastics Academy
- Head coach: Jay Scouler
Medal record
Men's trampoline gymnastics
Representing United Kingdom
World Championships
Gold medal – first place	2022 Sofia	All-around team
Silver medal – second place	2026 Nanjing	Synchro
Bronze medal – third place	2023 Birmingham	Individual team
Bronze medal – third place	2023 Birmingham	All-around team
Bronze medal – third place	2021 Bakou	All-around team
Bronze medal – third place	2025 Pamplona	All-Around Team
European Championships
Gold medal – first place	2024 Guimarães	Synchro
Bronze medal – third place	2022 Rimini	Individual team

Zak Perzamanos (born 17 June 2003) is a British trampoline gymnast. He represented Great Britain at the 2024 Summer Olympics, finishing fourth in the men's trampoline final. He is a four-time medalist at the Trampoline Gymnastics World Championships, including a gold medal he won with the British team in 2022. He won the synchronized trampoline event at the 2024 European Championships with his partner Corey Walkes.

== Career ==
Perzamanos began trampoline gymnastics when he was nine years old. His older sister, Holly, also competed in the sport.

=== Junior ===
Perzamanos competed at the 2015 World Age Group Competitions and won a silver medal in double mini trampoline among the 11-12 year olds. He also finished sixth in individual and seventh in synchro. He also competed at the 2017 and 2018 World Age Group Competitions, finishing 63rd and 61st in the individual trampoline event, respectively. He won a silver medal with the British trampoline team at the 2018 European Championships. Then at the 2019 World Age Group Competitions, he finished seventh in the synchro event alongside Martin Bland.

=== Senior ===
Perzamanos competed at his first World Championships in 2021, and he won a bronze medal in the mixed all-around team event. He also finished ninth in the individual event. Then at the 2022 World Championships, he won a gold medal with the British all-around team.

Perzamanos finished 11th at the 2023 Baku World Cup and 21st at the Coimbra World Cup. He qualified for his first World Cup final at the event in Palm Beach, and he won the bronze medal behind Wang Zisai and Dylan Schmidt. He then finished 12th at the Varna World Cup. He helped the British men's trampoline team win the team event at the 2023 World Championships and by qualifying for the individual final, he qualified for the 2024 Summer Olympics. He went on the finish fifth in the individual event, and he placed fourth in the synchro event alongside Corey Walkes. He also won a bronze medal in the mixed all-around team event.

Perzamanos and Corey Walkes finished sixth in the synchro event at the 2024 Baku World Cup, and he finished 23rd in the individual event. Perzamanos and Walkes then won a bronze medal at the Cottbus World Cup. He finished 15th in the individual event at the Arosa World Cup. Perzamanos and Walker won the synchro title at the 2024 European Championships.

Perzamanos competed at the 2024 Summer Olympics in Paris where he finished fourth. This marked the best Olympic finish for Great Britain in men's trampoline, beating Lee Brearley's sixth-place finish in 2000.
