= Lewis Gosling =

British trampoline gymnast (born 2003)

Personal information
- Born: 2003 (age 22–23) Welwyn Garden City, United Kingdom

Sport
- Sport: Trampolining

Lewis Gosling (born 2003 in Welwyn Garden City) is a British athlete who competes in trampoline gymnastics.

== Sporting career ==
Gosling won a gold medal at the 2022 Trampoline Gymnastics World Championships. He won a bronze medal at the 2023 Trampoline Gymnastics World Championships. He will compete at the 2026 European Trampoline Championships.

== Awards ==
Trampoline Gymnastics World Championships
Year	Place	Medal	Type
2022	Sofía (Bulgaria)	Gold	All-around Team
2023	Birmingham (UK)	Bronze	Double Mini Team
2023	Birmingham (UK)	Bronze	All-around Team
European Championship
Year	Place	Medal	Type
2022	Rimini (Italy)	Bronze	Double Mini Team
2022	Rimini (Italy)	Silver	Double Mini Individual
