= Tofig Aliyev =

Azerbaijani gymnast (born 2004)

Personal information
- Born: 19 November 2004 (age 21) Baku

Sport
- Sport: Tumbling gymnast
Medal record
Men's trampoline gymnastics
Representing Azerbaijan
World Championships
Gold medal – first place	2023 Birmingham	Tumbling team
Gold medal – first place	2025 Pamplona	Tumbling team
Gold medal – first place	2026 Nanjing	Tumbling team
Silver medal – second place	2026 Nanjing	Tumbling
European Championships
Silver medal – second place	2024 Guimarães	Tumbling
Bronze medal – third place	2022 Rimini	Tumbling team
World Games
Silver medal – second place	2025 Chengdu	Tumbling

Tofig Aliyev (born 29 November 2004 in Baku) is an Azerbaijani athlete who competes in trampoline gymnastics.

At the 2025 World Games in Chengdu, he achieved a historic milestone by landing the world's first “full-full-full"— a triple backflip where each somersault includes a complete 360° twist.

In February 2026, at the Trampoline Gymnastics and Tumbling World Cup in Baku, Tofig Aliyev won the silver medal.

In November 2026, Tofig Aliyev won a silver medal at the World Trampoline Gymnastics and Tumbling Championships in Nanjing, China.
