= Marshall Frost =

British trampoline gymnast (born 2005)

Personal information
- Born: 2005 (age 20–21) Stevenage, United Kingdom

Sport
- Sport: Trampolining

Marshall Frost (born 2005 in Stevenage) is a British athlete who competes in trampoline gymnastics.

== Career ==
Frost trains at the Marriotts Gymnastics Club. He won a bronze medal at the 2023 Trampoline Gymnastics World Championships.

== Awards ==
Trampoline Gymnastics World Championships
Year	Place	Medal	Type
2023	Birmingham (UK)	Bronze	Double Mini Team
European Championship
Year	Place	Medal	Type
2022	Rímini (Italy)	Bronze	Double Mini Team
