= Peter Buravytskiy =

British trampoline gymnast (born 2001)

Personal information
- Born: 2001 (age 24–25) Lincoln, England, United Kingdom

Sport
- Sport: Trampolining

Peter Buravytskiy (born 2001 in Lincoln) is a British athlete who competes in trampoline gymnastics. He won a bronze medal at the 2023 Trampoline Gymnastics World Championships.

== Awards ==
Trampoline Gymnastics World Championships
Year	Place	Medal	Type
2023	Birmingham (UK)	Bronze	Equipment
Junior European Championship
Year	Place	Medal	Type
2018	Baku (Azerbaijan)	Silver	Trampoline Team
