= Candy Brière-Vetillard =

French tumbling gymnast (born 2003)

- Born: 17 October 2003 (age 22) Le Mans, France

Gymnastics career
- Discipline: Tumbling
- Country represented: France
Medal record
Women's tumbling
Representing France
World Championships
Gold medal – first place	2021 Baku	Tumbling Team
Gold medal – first place	2023 Birmingham	Tumbling
Gold medal – first place	2025 Pamplona	Tumbling Team
Silver medal – second place	2023 Birmingham	Tumbling Team
Silver medal – second place	2025 Pamplona	Tumbling
Bronze medal – third place	2022 Sofia	Tumbling Team
World Games
Gold medal – first place	2022 Birmingham	Tumbling
Silver medal – second place	2025 Chengdu	Tumbling
European Championships
Gold medal – first place	2021 Sochi	Tumbling Team
Gold medal – first place	2022 Rimini	Tumbling
Gold medal – first place	2022 Rimini	Tumbling Team
Silver medal – second place	2024 Guimarães	Tumbling Team
Bronze medal – third place	2021 Sochi	Tumbling
Junior European Championships
Bronze medal – third place	2018 Baku	Tumbling Team
Trampoline World Age Group Competitions
Gold medal – first place	2019 Tokyo	Tumbling
Silver medal – second place	2017 Sofia	Tumbling
Bronze medal – third place	2018 Saint Petersburg	Tumbling

Candy Brière-Vetillard (born 17 October 2003) is a French tumbling gymnast.

== Career ==
At the 2021 European Championships in Sochi, Brière-Vetillard won the gold medal in the team event with Manon Morançais, Maëlle Dumitru-Marin and Lucie Tumoine; it was France's first title in this discipline since the 2000 European Championships in Eindhoven; she also won the bronze medal in individual. At the 2021 World Championships in Baku, she won the gold medal in the team event with Lucie Tumoine, Émilie Wambote and Maëlle Dumitru-Marin.

Brière-Vetillard won two gold medals at the 2022 European Championships in the individual and team events.
