= Double mini trampoline =

Gymnastics discipline

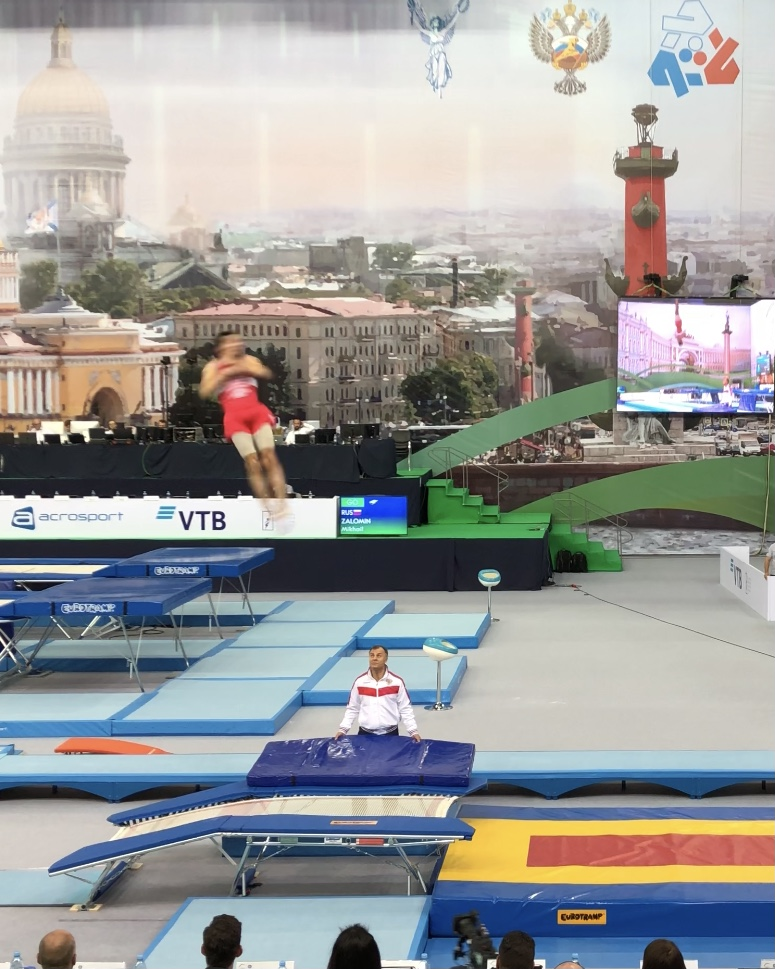
- 9 Time World Double Mini Trampoline Champion Mikhail Zalomin, at the 2018 World Championships
- Highest governing body: World Gymnastics

Characteristics
- Team members: Individuals or Teams of 3 or 4
- Mixed-sex: No
- Type: Gymnastic sport

Presence
- Country or region: Worldwide
- Olympic: No
- World Games: 2001 – 2025

Double mini trampoline, sometimes referred to as double mini or DMT, is a gymnastics discipline within trampolining. Participants perform acrobatic skills on an apparatus smaller than a regular competition trampoline. The apparatus has both an angled section and a flat section. Unlike individual trampoline, where scoring is predominantly determined by execution, time of flight and difficulty, the difficulty in DMT plays a more prominent role in the final score.

A DMT routine or pass consist of two phases. The first phase is called a "mount"; during this phase the athlete jumps onto the angled part and flips off of it onto the flat part. The first phase can also be performed by jumping, without flips or twist, onto the flat part and then commencing the first flip or twist. In this case the first phase is called a "spotter". The second phase starts on the flat part and is called a "dismount"; the athlete lands the first flipping sequences from phase one and immediately launches into a second series of flips and twists before landing on a mat.

The athletes are judged on difficulty and execution. Competitions may take place in teams or individually.

DMT is governed by the FIG, the International Federation of Gymnastics, and is included as an event within Trampoline Gymnastics. Although not an Olympic event yet, Elite DMT athletes compete at an international level and can compete in various events organised by the FIG as well as at the World Games.

== History ==
DMT can be sourced back to 1970 when its inventors Robert F Bollinger and George Nissen combined two mini trampolines with a small table and mat to cover in between. Later Robert F Bollinger combined the two mini trampolines to create one 430 cm long Double Mini Trampoline and also designed the rules for competition and terms such as the mounter and spotter passes and he established its own difficulty system roughly based on the system used for diving. Robert F Bollinger was part of George Nissen's trampoline act and just as Nissen can be seen as the father of trampoline, Robert F Bollinger can be seen as the father of Double Mini Trampoline.
The first record of a double mini competition comes from the Trampoline Gymnastics World Age Group Competitions in 1973 held in London, England. Athletes competing had little experience in the new apparatus and Robert F Bollinger jumped in and provided personal training on the Friday afternoon for the athletes wishing to compete the following day. Double mini was first introduced into the Trampoline World Championships, only six years after its invention, in the 1976, 9th Trampoline World Championships in Tulsa.

The DMT as we see it today is wider than the one Robert F Bollinger and George Nissen first created, and the change came mid 1990 when Horst Kunze, then President of the FIG Trampoline Technical Committee, asked Eurotramp Trampoline company if they could produce a DMT with a wider frame. This resulted in a wider DMT with a bed of 92 cm, which Horst Kunze states gave a real boost to the discipline. Since then this has been the international standard.

== Skills ==
Some common skills performed at international level competitions are: A Comprehensive list of skills can be found in FIG Code of Point Difficulty.

=== Full-In Full-Out ===
Also known as Double-Twisting Double Back

FIG Code 822

A somersault commonly used as a dismount in which the athlete takes off traveling backwards and does a double somersault with a double twist, full twist in the first somersault and full twist in the second somersault. This skill can be performed either tucked, piked or straight.

=== Triple Back Somersault ===
FIG Code 12---

A somersault commonly used as a dismount in which the athlete takes off traveling backwards and does a triple somersault. This skill can be performed either tucked, piked or, uncommonly, straight.

=== Miller ===
Also known as Full in Double-Full Out or Triple-Twisting Double back

FIG Code 833

A somersault used as a dismount in which the athlete takes off traveling backwards and does a double somersault with a triple twist. This skill is named after world champion Wayne Miller (USA). This skill can be performed ether tucked, piked or straight.

=== Full-In Half-Out ===
Also known as Full-Half, Full-In Barani-Out or Full-Barani

FIG Code 821

A somersault commonly used as a mount in which the athlete takes off traveling forwards and does a double somersault with a one and a half twist, full twist in the first somersault and half twist in the second somersault. This skill can be performed ether tucked, piked or straight.

=== Fliffis ===
Also known as Half-Out

FIG Code 8-1

A somersault commonly used as a mount in which the athlete takes off traveling forwards and does a double somersault with a half twist, no twist in the first somersault and half twist in the second somersault. This skill can be performed ether tucked, piked or straight.

=== Triffis ===
Also known as Half-out Triffis or 'Triff'

FIG Code 12--1

A somersault commonly used as a mount in which the athlete takes off traveling forwards and does a triple somersault with a half twist, no twist in the first two somersaults and a half twist in the third somersault. This skill can be performed either tucked or piked.

== FIG Code of Point Difficulty ==
The difficulty in double mini is based upon a bonus system, where the number of rotation and twists are multiplied and then the position is added. The positions are tuck, pike and straight which are represented by "O" for Tuck, "<" for Pike and "/" for Straight

The FIG numeric system works as follows, first number is the amount of 1/4-rotations second number is the amount of 1/2-twist, the twists are divided into where in the skill they occur.

Example: Full-In Half-Out (8 2 1) has a total of 8 1/4-rotations corresponding to the first 8 then it has 2 1/2-twists in the first somersault corresponding to the 2 and 1 1/2-twists the second somersault corresponding to the 1

== FIG World Championship results ==
=== Men's Individual ===
Year	Location	Gold		Silver		Bronze	
1976	Tulsa	Ron Merriott (USA)	26.300	Rob Bollinger (USA)	26.000	Derick Lotz (RSA)	25.200
1978	Newcastle	Stuart Ransom (USA)	25.900	Brett Austine (AUS)	25.900	Don Zasadny (USA)	24.700
1980	Brig	Derick Lotz (RSA)	25.200	Manfred Schwedler (FRG)	23.600	Brett Austine & Stephen Evetts (AUS)	23.300
1982	Bozeman	Brett Austine (AUS)	26.800	Derick Lotz (RSA)	26.100	Manfred Schwedler (FRG)	25.800
1984	Osaka	Brett Austine (AUS)	26.200	John Merritt (AUS)	25.300	Steve Elliott (USA)	25.000
1986	Paris	Brett Austine (AUS)	26.400	Terry Butler (USA)	25.900	Chad Fox (USA)	25.700
1988	Birmingham	Adrian Wareham (AUS)	27.500	Terry Butler (USA)	27.000	Brett Austine (AUS)	26.600
1990	Essen	Adrian Wareham (AUS)	28.900	Jorge Moreira (POR)	28.000	Steffen Eislöffel (FRG)	27.600
1992	Auckland	Jorge Pereira (POR)	28.670	Steffen Eislöffel (FRG)	28.530	Jeremy Brock (CAN)	28.400
1994	Porto	Jorge Pereira (POR)	12.130	Adrian Wareham (AUS)	11.900	Luis Nunes (POR)	11.800
1996	Vancouver	Chris Mitruk (CAN)	23.800	Ji Wallace (AUS)	23.800	Radostin Rachev (BUL)	23.440
1998	Sydney	Rodolfo Rangel (BRA)	24.800	Joao Marques (POR)	24.130	Chris Mitruk (CAN)	23.200
1999	Sun City	Chris Mitruk (CAN)	25.000	Jörg Gehrke (GER)	24.530	Rodolfo Rangel (BRA)	24.330
2001	Odense	Nuno Lico (POR)	63.900	Amadeu Neves (POR)	63.700	Rodolfo Rangel (BRA)	63.600
2003	Hannover	Alexey Ilichev (RUS)	64.500	Adam Menzies (CAN)	64.400	Nico Gärtner (GER)	63.900
2005	Eindhoven	Radostin Rachev (BUL)	75.100	Keith Douglas (USA)	73.400	Nico Gärtner (GER)	73.100
2007	Quebec City	Kirill Ivanov (RUS)	78.000	Denis Vachon (CAN)	73.600	Kalon Ludvigson (USA)	71.600
2009	St Petersburg	André Lico (POR)	75.500	Tim Lunding (SWE)	69.600	André Fernandes (POR)	69.300
2010	Metz	André Lico (POR)	73.400	Austin White (USA)	73.000	Evgeny Chernoivanov (RUS)	72.700
2011	Birmingham	Bruno Martini (BRA)	70.200	Austin White (USA)	69.700	Evgeny Chernoivanov (RUS)	68.700
2013	Sofia	Mikhail Zalomin (RUS)	77.800	Alexander Renkert (USA)	73.200	Bruno Nobre (POR)	69.200
2014	Daytona Beach	Mikhail Zalomin (RUS)	78.100	Austin White (USA)	77.500	Austin Nacey (USA)	74.500
2015	Odense	Austin White (USA)	79.600	Mikhail Zalomin (RUS)	78.400	Matthew Weal (USA)	74.800
2017	Sofia	Mikhail Zalomin (RUS)	78.800	Austin Nacey (USA)	78.300	Aleksandr Odinsov (RUS)	76.900
2018	St Petersburg	Mikhail Zalomin (RUS)	78.200	Ruben Padilla (USA)	73.500	Lucas Adorno (ARG)	72.400
2019	Tokyo	Mikhail Zalomin (RUS)	77.100	Ruben Padilla (USA)	76.100	Alexander Renkert (USA)	74.100
2021	Baku	Vasilii Makarskii (RUS)	77.400	Diogo Cabral (POR)	75.100	Ruben Padilla (USA)	74.900
2022	Sofia	Ruben Padilla (USA)	30.200	Gavin Dodd (CAN)	29.200	Tomas Minc (USA)	29.100
2023	Birmingham	Ruben Padilla (USA)	30.600	David Franco (ESP)	29.300	Tiago Sampaio Romao (POR)	23.600
2025	Pamplona	Ruben Padilla (USA)	31.300	Mikhail Zalomin (RUS)	29.200	West Fowler (USA)	28.800
2026	Nanjing	West Fowler (USA)	30.200	Ilia Penkin (RUS)	28.600	Aleksandr Butko (RUS)	20.500

Result are correct according to FIG's database as well as official records from the competition

=== Women's Individual ===
Year	Location	Gold		Silver		Bronze	
1976	Tulsa	Leigh Hennessy (USA)	24.800	Denise Seal (USA)	24.100	Nancy Boham (USA)	20.300
1978	Newcastle	Leigh Hennessy (USA)	22.900	Norma Lehto (CAN)	21.800	Bethany Fairchild (USA)	21.400
1980	Brig	Bethany Fairchild (USA)	22.100	Norma Lehto (CAN)	22.000	Charlene Geyser (RSA)	20.700
1982	Bozeman	Christine Tough (CAN)	24.300	Gabriele Dreier (FRG)	24.100	Bethany Fairchild (USA)	23.700
1984	Osaka	Gabriele Dreier (FRG)	23.500	Cherie Mathers (AUS)	23.300	Vicki Bullock (CAN) & Lesley Stephens (AUS)	22.600
1986	Paris	Bettina Lehmann (FRG)	24.000	Marie-Andrée Richard (CAN)	23.400	Gabriele Dreier (FRG)	23.000
1988	Birmingham	Elisabeth Jensen (AUS)	24.100	Lisa Newman-Morris (AUS)	23.600	Gabriele Dreier (FRG)	22.800
1990	Essen	Lisa Newman-Morris (AUS)	24.600	Kylie Walker (NZL)	24.500	Elisabeth Jensen (AUS)	24.500
1992	Auckland	Kylie Walker (NZL)	26.270	Donna White (AUS)	25.100	Robyn Forbes (AUS)	24.200
1994	Porto	Kylie Walker (NZL)	11.100	Jaime Strandmark (USA)	11.030	Kimberley Sans (USA)	10.800
1996	Vancouver	Jennifer Sans (USA)	21.730	Lisa Colussi (CAN)	21.480	Maria Oliveira (POR)	20.690
1998	Sydney	Kylie Walker (NZL)	21.860	Jennifer Parilla (USA)	21.400	Teodora Sinilkova (BUL)	21.270
1999	Sun City	Lisa Colussi-Mitruk (CAN)	22.400	Marina Mourinova (RUS)	21.470	Erin Maguire (USA)	21.270
2001	Odense	Marina Mourinova (RUS)	62.200	Monica Fernandez (POR)	61.800	Katarina Prokesova (SVK)	61.100
2003	Hannover	Sarah Charles (CAN)	62.200	Antonia Ivanova (BUL)	61.800	Shelly Klochan (USA)	61.600
2005	Eindhoven	Silvia Saiote (POR)	65.700	Anna Ivanova (RUS)	65.000	Ana Simoes (POR)	64.700
2007	Quebec City	Sarah Charles (CAN)	70.900	Julie Warnock (CAN)	69.700	Kaci Barry (USA)	68.800
2009	St Petersburg	Victoria Voronina (RUS)	68.300	Galina Goncharenko (RUS)	68.000	Corissa Boychuck (CAN)	67.100
2010	Metz	Corissa Boychuck (CAN)	70.500	Bianca Budler** (RSA)	70.300	Svetlana Balandian (RUS)	70.200
2011	Birmingham	Svetlana Balandian (RUS)	70.200	Bianca Zoonekynd** (RSA)	69.700	Victoria Voronina (RUS)	68.700
2013	Sofia	Kristle Lowell (USA)	71.100	Svetlana Balandian (RUS)	70.000	Jasmin Short (GBR)	68.600
2014	Daytona Beach	Erin Jauch (USA)	71.400	Jasmin Short (GBR)	70.300	Polina Troianova (RUS)	66.000
2015	Odense	Erin Jauch (USA)	71.100	Jasmin Short (GBR)	69.800	Lina Sjöberg (SWE)	67.900
2017	Sofia	Bianca Zoonekynd** (RSA)	68.900	Polina Troianova (RUS)	67.800	Lina Sjöberg (SWE)	67.200
2018	St Petersburg	Lina Sjöberg (SWE)	72.100	Melania Rodriguez (ESP)	70.000	Kristle Lowell (USA)	67.700
2019	Tokyo	Lina Sjöberg (SWE)	69.000	Bronwyn Dibb (NZL)	68.800	Alekandra Bonartseva (RUS)	68.200
2021	Baku	Lina Sjöberg (SWE)	70.900	Shelby Nobuhara (USA)	70.000	Melania Rodriguez (ESP)	69.600
2022	Sofia	Bronwyn Dibb (NZL)	24.900	Tristan van Natta (USA)	24.800	Cheyanna Robinson (AUS)	24.000
2023	Birmingham	Melania Rodriguez (ESP)	26.300	Aliah Raga (USA)	26.200	Grace Harder (USA)	26.100
2025	Pamplona	Melania Rodriguez (ESP)	26.700	Galina Begim (RUS)	26.400	Kirsty Way (GBR)	26.100
2026	Nanjing	Galina Begim (RUS)	26.200	Bronwyn Dibb (NZL)	25.900	Susan Gill (USA)	25.000

**Bianca Budler and Bianca Zoonekynd is the same person

Result are correct according to FIG's database as well as official records from the competition
