= Hannes Koenig =

German trampoline gymnast (born 2001)

Personal information
- Born: 2001 (age 23–24); Osterholz-Scharmbeck, Lower Saxony, Germany

Sport
- Sport: Trampolining

Hannes Koenig (born 2001) is a German athlete who competes in trampoline gymnastics.

He won a bronze medal at the 2024 European Trampoline Championships.

== Awards ==
European Championship
Year	Place	Medal	Type
2024	Guimarães (Portugal)	Bronze	Equipment
