= Kirsty Way =

British trampoline gymnast

Personal information
- Born: 1998 (age 27–28) Dorchester, Dorset, United Kingdom

Sport
- Sport: Double mini trampoline
Medal record
Women's Double mini trampoline
Representing United Kingdom
World Championships
Gold medal – first place	2022 Sofia	Mixed Team
Gold medal – first place	2023 Birmingham	Double Mini Team
Silver medal – second place	2015 Odense	Double Mini Team
Silver medal – second place	2019 Tokyo	Double Mini Team
Silver medal – second place	2025 Pamplona	Double Mini Team
Bronze medal – third place	2017 Sofia	Double Mini Team
Bronze medal – third place	2022 Sofia	Double Mini Team
Bronze medal – third place	2023 Birmingham	Mixed Team
Bronze medal – third place	2025 Pamplona	Double Mini
Bronze medal – third place	2025 Pamplona	Mixed Team
Bronze medal – third place	2026 Nanjing	Double Mini Team
European Trampoline Championships
Gold medal – first place	2018 Baku	Double Mini
Gold medal – first place	2022 Rimini	Double Mini
Gold medal – first place	2022 Rimini	Double Mini Team
Silver medal – second place	2018 Baku	Double Mini Team
Silver medal – second place	2024 Guimarães	Double Mini Team
Bronze medal – third place	2016 Valladolid	Double Mini
Bronze medal – third place	2016 Valladolid	Double Mini Team

Kirsty Way (born 1998) is a British athlete who competes in Double Mini Trampolining.

She won ten medals at the World Trampoline Gymnastics Championships between the years 2015 to 2025.

== Awards ==
World Championship
Year	Place	Medal	Event
2015	Odense (Denmark)	Silver	Double Mini Team
2017	Sofía (Bulgaria)	Bronze	Double Mini Team
2019	Tokio (Japan)	Silver	Double Mini Team
2022	Sofía (Bulgaria)	Gold	Mixed team
2022	Sofía (Bulgaria)	Bronze	Double Mini Team
2023	Birmingham (UK)	Gold	Double Mini Team
2023	Birmingham (UK)	Bronze	Mixed Team
2025	Pamplona (Spain)	Silver	Double Mini Team
2025	Pamplona (Spain)	Bronze	Double Mini
2025	Pamplona (Spain)	Bronze	Mixed Team
European Championship
Year	Place	Medal	Event
2016	Valladolid (Spain)	Bronze	Double Mini
2016	Valladolid (Spain)	Bronze	Double Mini Team
2018	Baku (Azerbaijan)	Gold	Double Mini
2018	Baku (Azerbaijan)	Silver	Double Mini Team
2022	Rímini (Italy)	Gold	Double Mini
2022	Rímini (Italy)	Gold	Double Mini Team
2024	Guimarães (Portugal)	Silver	Double Mini Team
