= Jorge Martín (gymnast) =

Spanish trampolinist (born 1998)

Personal information
- Born: 23 November 1998 (age 26); Leganés, Spain

Sport
- Sport: Trampolining

Jorge Martín (born 23 November 1998) is a Spanish athlete who competes in trampoline gymnastics.

He won a silver medal at the 2023 Trampoline Gymnastics World Championships and a bronze medal at the 2024 European Trampoline Championships, both in the team event.

== Awards ==
World Championship
Year	Place	Medal	Type
2023	Birmingham (United Kingdom)	Silver	Equipment
European Championship
Year	Place	Medal	Type
2024	Guimarães (Portugal)	Bronze	Equipment
