= Cheyenne Webster =

American gymnast (born 1998)

Personal information
- Born: November 25, 1998 (age 26)

Sport
- Sport: Trampolining

Cheyenne Sarah Webster (born November 25, 1998) is an American athlete who competes in trampoline gymnastics. She won three medals at the Trampoline Gymnastics World Championships in 2022 and 2023.

== International awards ==
Trampoline Gymnastics World Championships
Year	Place	Medal	Event
2022	Sofia (Bulgaria)	Silver	Mixed team
2023	Birmingham (UK)	Gold	Synchronized
2023	Birmingham (UK)	Gold	Mixed team
