= Omo Aikeremiokha =

British athlete who competes in trampoline gymnastics

Personal information
- Born: 28 April 2005 (age 21) Stevenage, United Kingdom

Sport
- Sport: Trampolining
Medal record
Men's trampoline gymnastics
Representing Great Britain
World Games
Silver medal – second place	2025 Chengdu	Double mini
World Championships
Bronze medal – third place	2023 Birmingham	Double mini team
Bronze medal – third place	2025 Pamplona	All-Around Team
European Championships
Bronze medal – third place	2022 Rimini	Double mini team

Omo Aikeremiokha (born 28 April 2005) is a British athlete who competes in trampoline gymnastics.

He won a bronze medal at the 2023 Trampoline Gymnastics World Championships. He also competed in the single event.

In the 2024 European Trampoline Championships, Aikeremiokha missed out on a podium finish as part of the men's double mini team with Ethan Cunningham and Daniel Berridge.

He competed at the 2025 World Games.
