= Bronwyn Dibb =

New Zealand trampoline gymnast (born 1997)

- Born: 1997 (age 28–29) Durban, South Africa

Gymnastics career
- Discipline: Trampoline gymnastics
- Country represented: New Zealand
Medal record
Representing New Zealand
Women's trampoline
World Championships
Gold medal – first place	2022 Sofia	Double mini
Silver medal – second place	2019 Tokyo	Double mini
Silver medal – second place	2026 Nanjing	Double mini
World Games
Silver medal – second place	2022 Birmingham	Double mini

Bronwyn Dibb (born 1997) is a New Zealand trampoline gymnast specialising in double mini trampoline. At the 2022 Trampoline Gymnastics World Championships, she won the women's double mini trampoline event.
