= Andrés Martínez (gymnast) =

Spanish trampoline gymnast (born 2002)

Personal information
- Born: 2002 (age 23–24) Valladolid, Spain

Sport
- Sport: Trampolining

Andrés Martínez (born 2002) is a Spanish athlete who competes in trampoline gymnastics.

He won three medals at the Trampoline Gymnastics World Championships between 2021 and 2023, and four medals at the European Trampoline Championships, in 2022 and 2024.

== Awards ==
World Championship
Year	Place	Medal	Type
2021	Baku (Azerbaijan)	Bronze	Equipment
2022	Sofía (Bulgaria)	Gold	Equipment
2023	Birmingham (Reino Unido)	Silver	Equipment
European Championship
Year	Place	Medal	Type
2022	Rímini (Italy)	Gold	Equipment
2022	Rímini (Italy)	Bronze	Individual
2024	Guimarães (Portugal)	Gold	Equipment
2024	Guimarães (Portugal)	Silver	Individual
Junior European Championship
Year	Place	Medal	Type
2018	Baku (Azerbaijan)	Silver	Double Mini Team
