= Bethany Williamson =

British trampoline gymnast (born 1999)

Personal information
- Born: 1999 (age 26–27) Wirral, United Kingdom

Sport
- Sport: Trampolining

Bethany Williamson (born 1999) is a British athlete who competes in trampoline gymnastics. Williamson comes from The Wirral.

== Results ==
World Championship
Year	Place	Medal	Event
2017	Sofía (Bulgaria)	Silver	Double Mini Team
2019	Tokyo (Japan)	Silver	Double Mini Team
2021	Baku (Azerbaijan)	Bronze	All Around Team
2022	Sofía (Bulgaria)	Bronze	Double Mini Team
2023	Birmingham (UK)	Gold	Double Mini Team
European Championship
Year	Place	Medal	Event
2016	Valladolid (Spain)	Bronze	Double Mini Individual Junior
2016	Valladolid (Spain)	Silver	Double Mini Team Junior
2022	Rímini (Italy)	Gold	Double Mini Team
2024	Guimarães(Portugal)	Silver	Double Mini Team
