= Ryusei Nishioka =

Japanese trampoline gymnast (born 2003)

- Born: November 1, 2003 (age 23) Higashiōsaka, Japan
- Height: 168 cm (5 ft 6 in)

Gymnastics career
- Discipline: Trampoline gymnastics
- Club: Abeno Junior Trampoline Club
- Head coach: Kitai Hiroki
Medal record
Representing Japan
Trampoline gymnastics
World Championships
Silver medal – second place	2021 Baku	Individual
Silver medal – second place	2021 Baku	Individual team
Bronze medal – third place	2023 Birmingham	Individual

Ryusei Nishioka (Japanese: 西岡隆成, romanized: Nishioka Ryūsei; born November 1, 2003) is a Japanese trampoline gymnast. He won two silver medals at the 2021 World Championships and one bronze medal at the 2023 World Championships. In 2021, he broke the world record difficulty score for trampoline gymnastics.

== Early and personal life ==
Nishioka was born on November 1, 2003, in Higashiōsaka and began artistic gymnastics when he was two years old. He switched to trampoline gymnastics in grade one of primary school. As of 2024, he studies law at Kindai University. Despite competing in trampoline gymnastics, he is afraid of heights and will not ride roller coasters, and he does not enjoy the sport.

== Career ==
Nishioka won the title at the 2015 All-Japan Junior Championships when he was in grade six. He competed at his first World Age Group Competition in 2017 and won the individual silver medal in the 13–14 age group. At the 2018 Pacific Championships, he won a gold medal in the team event. He also won a bronze medal in the junior individual event and a silver medal in the synchronized event with Motoki Nakayama. He then won the individual bronze medal at the 2018 World Age Group Competition in the 15–16 age group.

Nishioka won the All-Japan Championships at the senior level in both 2020 and 2021. He was initially not age-eligible for the 2020 Summer Olympics, but the one-year postponement of the Games gave him the opportunity to compete. He was selected as the alternate for Japan's team. He won a silver medal in the individual event at the 2021 Brescia World Cup.

During the 2021 World Championships in Baku, Nishioka successfully competed a routine with seven triple somersaults. His difficulty score was 18.900, which broke the world record difficulty score for trampoline gymnastics. With this routine, he won the silver medal in the individual event behind China's Yan Langyu due to a lower execution score. He also won a silver medal in the individual team event.

Nishioka won the individual title at the 2022 Coimbra World Cup, and he won a silver medal in synchronized trampoline with Yamato Ishikawa. One week later at the Arosa World Cup, he once again won the individual title. At the 2022 World Championships, he finished second in the individual qualification round. However, he tore his meniscus in the left knee during the semifinal round and withdrew from the competition. He had surgery in December and missed three months of training.

Nishioka returned to competition at the 2023 Coimbra World Cup, but he did not advance beyond the semifinal round after finishing tenth. Then at the Palm Beach World Cup, he finished fourth in the individual event. Then at the Varna World Cup, he won the bronze medal behind Chinese athletes Yan Langyu and Wang Zisai. He once again won the bronze medal in the individual event at the 2023 World Championships behind Yan and Wang.

Nishioka finished fifth in the individual event at the 2024 Cottbus World Cup despite a routine with six triple somersaults. Then at the Arosa World Cup, he only finished 23rd in the semifinals and did not advance. He represented Japan at the 2024 Summer Olympics and was aiming to win Japan's first Olympic medal in trampoline gymnastics. During the qualification round for the individual event, he was unable to complete both of his routines, and he finished in last place and did not advance to the finals.
