= Jessica Brain =

British gymnast (born 2002)

Personal information
- Born: 2002 (age 22–23); Hanover, Germany

Sport
- Sport: Trampolining

Jessica Brain (born 2002) is a British athlete who competes in trampoline gymnastics.

She won a gold medal at the Trampoline Gymnastics World Championships in 2022.

== Awards ==
Trampoline Gymnastics World Championships
Year	Place	Medal	Type
2022	Sofia (Bulgaria)	Gold	Tumbling Team
European Trampoline Championships
Year	Place	Medal	Type
2018	Baku (Azerbaijan)	Gold	Tumbling Team
2022	Rimini (Italy)	Silver	Tumbling Team
