= Pierre Gouzou =

French trampoline gymnast (born 1998)

- Born: 17 December 1998 (age 27) Meaux, France

Gymnastics career
- Discipline: Trampoline gymnastics
- Country represented: France; (2017 - present)
- Training location: Paris, France
- Club: Bois-Colombes Trampoline 92
- Gym: INSEP
Medal record
Men's trampoline gymnastics
Representing France
World Championships
Gold medal – first place	2023 Birmingham	Individual team
Silver medal – second place	2022 Sofia	Individual team
Bronze medal – third place	2021 Bakou	Synchro
Bronze medal – third place	2022 Sofia	Synchro
Bronze medal – third place	2023 Birmingham	Synchro
European Championships
Gold medal – first place	2022 Rimini	Individual team
Gold medal – first place	2024 Guimarães	Individual team
Silver medal – second place	2022 Rimini	Individual
Silver medal – second place	2024 Guimarães	Individual
Silver medal – second place	2024 Guimarães	Synchro
Bronze medal – third place	2018 Baku	Synchro

Pierre Gouzou (born 17 December 1998) is a French trampoline gymnast. He is a 2023 World and a two-time European (2022, 2024) team champion. He is a two-time individual European silver medalist and a three-time World synchro bronze medalist. He will represent France at the 2024 Summer Olympics.

== Early life ==
Gouzou began artistic gymnastics when he was three years old, but he switched to trampoline in 2009. He also competed in diving and was a regional champion of Aquitaine. When he was 13, he moved to Paris to improve his trampoline training.

== Career ==
Gouzou made his World Cup debut at the 2017 Minsk World Cup, finishing eighth in synchronized trampoline and 12th as an individual. He won a bronze medal in synchro with Allan Morante at the 2017 Valladolid World Cup. At the 2017 World Championships, the French team placed 11th, and Gouzou finished 64th as an individual in the qualification round.

Gouzou won bronze in synchronized trampoline with Josuah Faroux at the 2018 European Championships in Baku. He then won a bronze medal in synchro with Brendan Renault at the 2018 Loulé World Cup. He competed at the 2018 Maebashi World Cup and finished 16th with synchro partner Sebastien Martiny and 37th as an individual. He competed in synchro at the 2018 World Championships with Renault, and they finished 18th in the qualification round.

At the 2019 Minsk World Cup, Gouzou and Sebastien Martiny won the silver medal in synchro behind the defending World champions from Belarus, Uladzislau Hancharou and Aleh Rabtsau. Then at the 2019 Valladolid World Cup, he finished fifth with Allan Morante in synchro. At the 2019 World Championships, the French team placed sixth, and he finished 30th with Faroux in synchro and 27th as an individual.

Gouzou won a silver medal in the synchro final at the 2020 Baku World Cup. He was not selected to compete at the 2020 Summer Olympics. Gouzou and Faroux finished fifth as a synchro pair at the 2021 Brescia World Cup. They then won bronze medals at the 2021 World Championships in Baku.

At the 2022 European Championships in Rimini, Gouzou won a silver medal in the individual event behind teammate Allan Morante, and the French team won the gold medal. He won a bronze medal with his synchro partner Florestan Riou at the 2022 World Championships in Sofia.

Gouzou finished 13th as an individual at the 2023 Coimbra World Cup. He then placed sixth as an individual and with Riou in synchro at the Palm Beach World Cup. Then at the Varna World Cup, he finished fourth as an individual and eighth with synchro partner Riou. At the 2023 World Championships in Birmingham, he won the gold medal in team trampoline with Morgan Demiro-o-Domiro, Allan Morante and Julian Chartier, the first time a French team had done so since 1996. He also won the bronze medal in synchronized trampoline with Demiro-o-Domiro.

At the 2024 European Championships in Guimarães, Gouzou won the gold medal in team trampoline with Julian Chartier, Morgan Demiro-o-Domiro and Allan Morante, the silver medal in synchronized trampoline with Morgan Demiro-o-Domiro and the silver medal in individual trampoline.

Gouzou was selected to represent France at the 2024 Summer Olympics.
