= Nuno Villafane =

Spanish trampoline gymnast (born 2007)

Personal information
- Born: 2007 (age 17–18); Valladolid, Spain

Sport
- Sport: Trampolining

Nuno Villafane (born 2007) is a Spanish athlete who competes in trampoline gymnastics. He won a gold medal at the 2024 European Trampoline Championships.

== Awards ==
European Championship
| Year | Place | Medal | Type |
|---|---|---|---|
| 2024 | Guimarães (Portugal) | Gold | Equipment |
