= Corey Walkes =

British trampoline gymnast (born 2001)

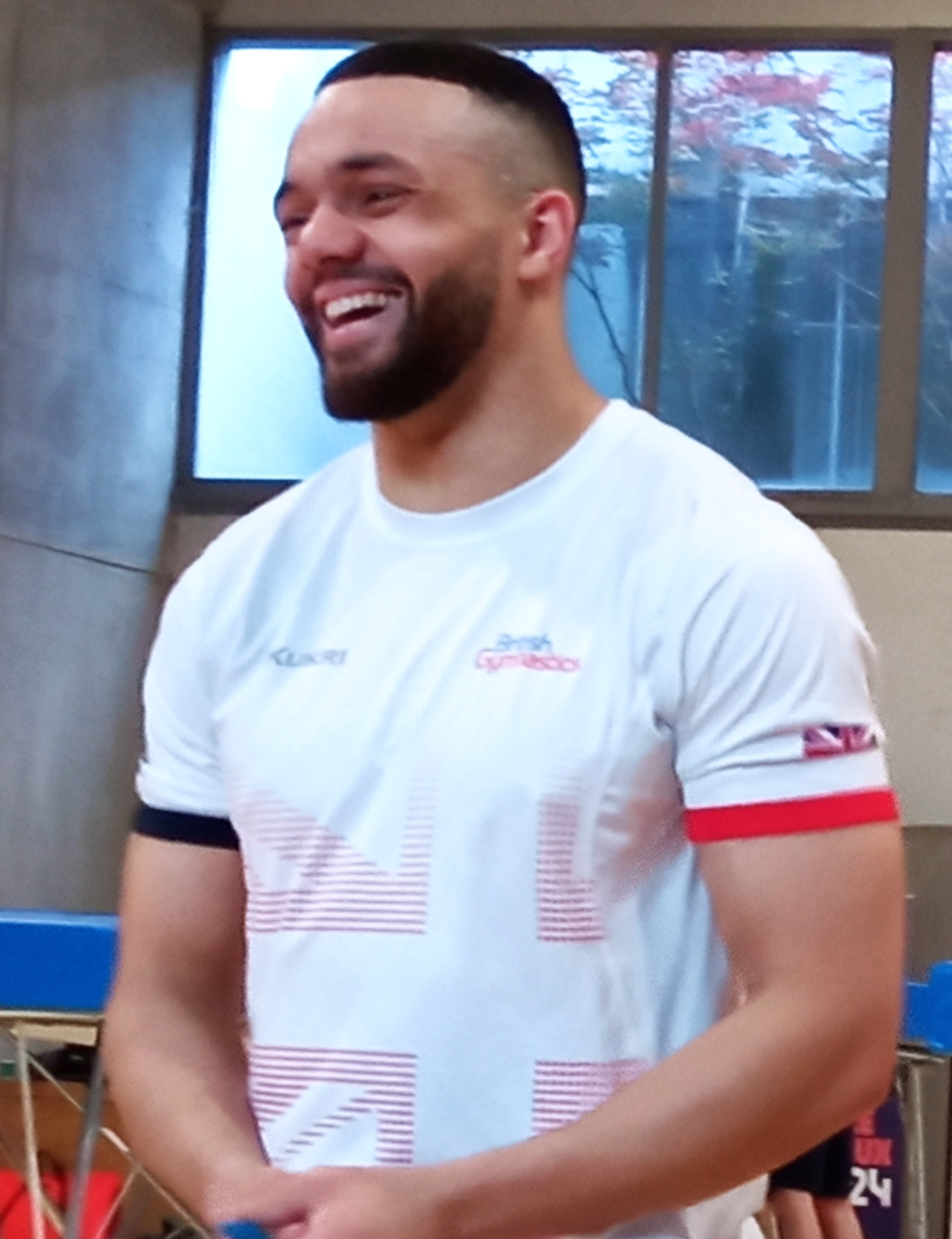

Personal information
- Born: 2001 (age 24–25) Bath, United Kingdom

Sport
- Sport: Trampolining
Medal record
Men's trampoline
Representing Great Britain
World Championships
Silver medal – second place	2026 Nanjing	Synchro
Bronze medal – third place	2021 Baku	All-Around Team
Bronze medal – third place	2023 Birmingham	All-Around Team
Bronze medal – third place	2023 Birmingham	Individual Team
Bronze medal – third place	2025 Pamplona	All-Around Team
European Championships
Gold medal – first place	2024 Guimarães	Synchro

Corey Walkes (born 2001) is a British athlete who competes in trampoline gymnastics.

He won three bronze medals at the World Trampoline Gymnastics Championships between the years 2021 to 2023.

He won a gold medal at the 2024 European Trampoline Championships with Zak Perzamanos.

== Personal life ==
Walkes lives in Radstock near Bath.

== Awards ==
Trampoline Gymnastics World Championships
Year	Place	Medal	Type
2021	Baku (Azerbaijan)	Bronze	All-around team
2023	Birmingham (UK)	Bronze	Individual team
2023	Birmingham (UK)	Bronze	All-around team
2025	Pamplona (Spain)	Bronze	All-around team
2026	Nanjing (China)	Silver	Synchro
European Championship
Year	Place	Medal	Type
2024	Guimarães (Portugal)	Gold	Synchro
Junior European Championship
Year	Place	Medal	Type
2018	Baku (Azerbaijan)	Silver	Trampoline Team
