= Vadim Afanasev =

Russian trampoline gymnast

- Born: 13 September 2000 (age 25) Volgogradskaya, Russia

Gymnastics career
- Discipline: Trampoline gymnastics
- Country represented: Russia
Medal record
Men's trampoline gymnastics
Representing RGF
World Championships
Gold medal – first place	2021 Baku	Tumbling Team
Representing Russia
World Championships
Gold medal – first place	2018 Saint Petersburg	Tumbling
Gold medal – first place	2019 Tokyo	All-around Team
Silver medal – second place	2019 Tokyo	Tumbling Team
European Championships
Gold medal – first place	2018 Baku	Tumbling Team
Gold medal – first place	2021 Sochi	Tumbling Team
Gold medal – first place	2021 Sochi	Tumbling
Bronze medal – third place	2018 Baku	Tumbling

Vadim Yevgenyevich Afanasev (Russian: Вадим Евгеньевич Афанасьев; born 13 September 2000) is a Russian trampoline gymnast. He won the gold medal in the men's tumbling competition at the 2018 Trampoline Gymnastics World Championships held in Saint Petersburg, Russia. He also won the gold medal in the men's tumbling and men's team tumbling events at the 2021 European Trampoline Championships held in Sochi, Russia.

In 2019, he helped Russia win the gold medal in the all-around team event at the 2019 Trampoline World Championships held in Tokyo, Japan.
