= Mikhail Malkin =

Azerbaijani gymnast (born 1996)

Personal information
- Born: 30 July 1996 (age 30) Bilajary, Baku, Azerbaijan

Sport
- Sport: Trampolining
Medal record
Men's trampoline gymnastics
Representing Azerbaijan
World Championships
Gold medal – first place	2025 Pamplona	Tumbling team
Gold medal – first place	2026 Nanjing	Tumbling team

Mikhail Malkin (born 30 July 1996 in Baku) is an Azerbaijani athlete who competes in trampoline gymnastics.

== Awards ==
World Championship
Year	Place	Medal	Type
2021	Baku (Azerbaijan)	Silver	Tumbling
2023	Birmingham (UK)	Gold	Tumbling
2023	Birmingham (UK)	Gold	Tumbling Team
European Championship
Year	Place	Medal	Type
2018	Baku (Azerbaijan)	Gold	Tumbling
2021	Sochi (Russia)	Bronze	Tumbling
2022	Rímini (Italy)	Silver	Tumbling
2022	Rímini (Italy)	Bronze	Tumbling Team
2024	Guimarães (Portugal)	Gold	Tumbling Team
