= Romana Schuring =

Dutch trampoline gymnast

Personal information
- Born: 1995 (age 30–31) Haarlem, Netherlands

Sport
- Sport: Trampolining

Romana Schuring (born 1995) is a Dutch athlete who competes in trampoline gymnastics. She won a silver medal at the 2022 European Trampoline Championships in the synchronized event. She competed at the 2025 Trampoline Gymnastics World Championships.

== Medals ==
European Trampoline Championships
Year	Place	Medal	Event
2022	Rímini (Italy)	Silver	Synchronized
