= Simon Dobler =

German trampoline gymnast (born 2006)

Personal information
- Born: 2006 (age 18–19); Germany

Sport
- Sport: Trampolining

Simon Dobler (born 2006) is a German athlete who competes in trampoline gymnastics.

He won a bronze medal at the 2024 European Trampoline Championships.

== Awards ==
European Championship
Year	Place	Medal	Type
2024	Guimarães (Portugal)	Bronze	Equipment
