= Matthias Pfleiderer =

German trampoline gymnast (born 1995)

Personal information
- Born: 9 September 1995 (age 29); Sonthofen, Bavaria, Germany

Sport
- Sport: Trampolining

Matthias Pfleiderer (born 9 September 1995) is a German athlete who competes in trampoline gymnastics.

He won three medals at the Trampoline Gymnastics World Championships, in 2021 and 2022, and two medals at the European Trampoline Championships, in 2022 and 2024.

Pfleiderer competed against Fabian Vogel for a place at the 2024 Summer Olympics.

== Awards ==
World Championship
Year	Place	Medal	Type
2021	Baku (Azerbaijan)	Silver	Synchronized
2022	Sofía (Bulgaria)	Gold	Synchronized
2022	Sofía (Bulgaria)	Bronze	Equipment
European Championship
Year	Place	Medal	Type
2022	Rímini (Italy)	Gold	Synchronized
2024	Guimarães (Portugal)	Silver	Equipment
