= Daniel Schmidt (gymnast) =

German trampoline gymnast (born 1991)

Personal information
- Born: 1991 (age 33–34); Hamburg, Germany

Sport
- Sport: Trampolining

Daniel Schmidt (born 1991) is a German athlete who competes in trampoline gymnastics.

Schmidt competed in the men's double mini-trampoline at the 2022 World Games and won a silver medal. He has competed at five Trampoline Gymnastics World Championships.

In 2024, he was awarded the SmartScoring Shooting star award alongside Tachina Peeters.

== Awards ==
European Championship
Year	Place	Medal	Type
2024	Guimarães (Portugal)	Bronze	Equipment
World Championship
Year	Place	Qualifiers	Type
2010	Metz (France)	26th	Individual Trampoline
2011	Birmingham (England)	43rd	Individual Trampoline
2013	Sofia (Bulgaria)	32nd	Individual Trampoline
2014	Daytona Beach (United States)	72nd	Individual Trampoline
2015	Odense (Denmark)	28th	Individual Trampoline

== See also ==
- List of 2022 World Games medal winners
