= Carlos del Ser =

Spanish trampoline gymnast (born 2003)

Personal information
- Born: 2003 (age 21–22); Valladolid, Spain

Sport
- Sport: Trampolining

Carlos del Ser (born 2003) is a Spanish athlete who competes in trampoline gymnastics.

He won three medals at the Trampoline Gymnastics World Championships between 2021 and 2023, and a gold medal at the 2022 European Trampoline Championships.

== Awards ==
World Championship
Year	Place	Medal	Type
2021	Baku (Azerbaijan)	Bronze	Equipment
2022	Sofía (Bulgaria)	Gold	Equipment
2023	Birmingham (UK)	Silver	Equipment
European Championship
Year	Place	Medal	Type
2022	Rímini (Italy)	Gold	Equipment
