= Melania Rodríguez =

Spanish trampoline gymnast (born 2001)

- Born: 29 January 2001 (age 25) Puenteareas, Spain

Gymnastics career
- Discipline: Trampoline gymnastics
- Country represented: Spain
Medal record
Women's Trampoline gymnastics
Representing Spain
World Games
Gold medal – first place	2022 Birmingham	Double Mini
Bronze medal – third place	2025 Chengdu	Double Mini
World Championships
Gold medal – first place	2023 Birmingham	Double Mini
Gold medal – first place	2025 Pamplona	Double Mini
Silver medal – second place	2018 Saint Petersburg	Double Mini
Bronze medal – third place	2021 Baku	Double Mini
Bronze medal – third place	2025 Pamplona	Double Mini Team
European Championships
Gold medal – first place	2018 Baku	Double Mini
Gold medal – first place	2022 Rimini	Individual Team
Gold medal – first place	2024 Guimarães	Double Mini
Bronze medal – third place	2018 Baku	Double Mini Team
Bronze medal – third place	2022 Rimini	Double Mini Team
Bronze medal – third place	2024 Guimarães	Double Mini Team
World Age Group Competitions
Gold medal – first place	2017 Sofia	Double Mini
Bronze medal – third place	2015 Odense	Double Mini
Junior European Championships
Gold medal – first place	2016 Valladolid	Double Mini

Melania Rodríguez (born 29 January 2001) is a Spanish athlete who competes in trampoline gymnastics.

As a junior, Rodríguez showed early promise in double mini, winning bronze at the 2015 Trampoline Gymnastics World Age Group Competition, gold at the 2016 Junior European Championships, and gold at the 2017 World Age Group Competition.

She joined the senior national team in 2018 and has since won thirteen medals at major international events, including gold (2022) and bronze (2025) medals at the World Games, two gold medals at the World Championships (2023, 2025), and three gold medals at the European Championships (2018, 2022, 2024).
