= Brana calopasa =

Scientific classification
- Kingdom: Animalia
- Phylum: Arthropoda
- Class: Insecta
- Order: Lepidoptera
- Superfamily: Noctuoidea
- Family: Erebidae
- Subfamily: Calpinae
- Genus: Brana; Walker, [1858]
- Species: B. calopasa

Binomial name
- Brana calopasa Walker, 1859

Species of moth

Brana is a monotypic moth genus of the family Noctuidae. Its only species, Brana calopasa, is found in Sri Lanka and Australia. Both the genus and species were described by Francis Walker, the genus in 1858 and the species in 1859. It It is a serious pest on Berrya cordifolia (Trincomalee wood).

== Description ==
Palpi with second joint not reaching vertex of head and third joint naked and porrect. Antennae almost simple. Thorax and abdomen smoothly scaled. Tibia spineless and moderately hairy. Forewings with somewhat rounded apex. Hindwings rather narrow. Veins 5 arise from above lower angle of cell.
