= Cao Yunzhu =

Chinese trampoline gymnast

Personal information
- Born: 2003 (age 21–22); Anhui, China

Sport
- Sport: Trampolining

Cao Yunzhu (Chinese: 曹云珠) (born 2003) is a Chinese athlete who competes in trampoline gymnastics. She won four medals at the World Trampoline Gymnastics Championships between 2021 and 2023.

== Awards ==
Trampoline Gymnastics World Championships
Year	Place	Medal	Type
2021	Baku (Azerbaijan)	Silver	Individual
2021	Baku (Azerbaijan)	Silver	Equipment
2022	Sofia (Bulgaria)	Gold	Equipment
2023	Birmingham (Great Britain)	Gold	Equipment
