= Shanice Davidson =

British trampoline gymnast

Personal information
- Born: 2000 (age 25–26) Gateshead, United Kingdom

Sport
- Sport: Trampolining

Shanice Davidson (born 2000) is a British athlete who competes in trampoline gymnastics.

She won six medals at the World Trampoline Gymnastics Championships between the years 2018 to 2023.

== Awards ==
World Championship
Year	Place	Medal	Proof
2018	Saint Petersburg (Russia)	Silver	Tumbling
2019	Tokyo (Japan)	Silver	Tumbling
2022	Sofia (Bulgaria)	Gold	Tumbling Team
2022	Sofia (Bulgaria)	Bronze	Tumbling
2023	Birmingham (UK)	Gold	Tumbling Team
2023	Birmingham (UK)	Bronze	Mixed team
European Championship
Year	Place	Medal	Proof
2018	Baku (Azerbaijan)	Gold	Tumbling Team
