= Ruth Shevelan =

English trampoline gymnast

Personal information
- Born: 1992 (age 33–34) Oldham, United Kingdom
- Education: University of Manchester

Sport
- Sport: Trampolining

Ruth Shevelan (born 1992) is a British athlete who competes in trampoline gymnastics.

== Biography ==
Shevelan comes from Stockport. She holds a master's degree in mechanical engineering from the University of Manchester.

== Awards ==
World Championship
| Year | Place | Medal | Event |
|---|---|---|---|
| 2023 | Birmingham (UK) | Gold | Double Mini Team |
European Championship
| Year | Place | Medal | Event |
| 2024 | Guimarães (Portugal) | Silver | Double Mini Team |
