= Tachina Peeters =

Belgian gymnast (born 1997)

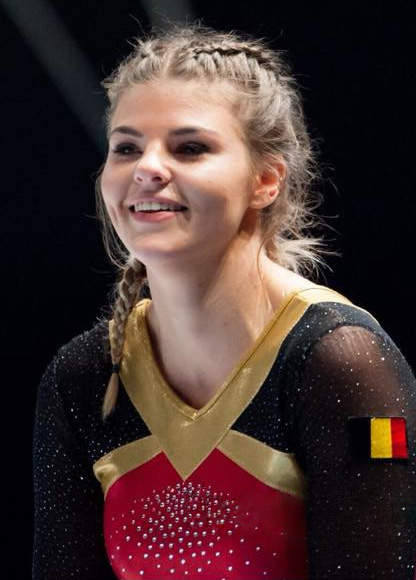

Personal information
- Full name: Tachina Peeters
- Born: May 27, 1997 (age 29) Bonheiden
- Height: 163 cm (5 ft 4 in)

Gymnastics career
- Discipline: Trampoline gymnastics
- Country represented: Belgium
Medal record
Women's trampoline gymnastics
Representing Belgium
European Championships
Gold medal – first place	2021 Sochi	Tumbling
Bronze medal – third place	2021 Sochi	Tumbling Team
Bronze medal – third place	2022 Rimini	Tumbling Team
Bronze medal – third place	2024 Giumarães	Tumbling Team
- Last updated on: 2024-04-06.

Tachina Peeters (born 27 May 1997 in Bonheiden) is a Belgian gymnast, active in tumbling. She is the 2021 European Champion tumbling.

In 2024, she was awarded the SmartScoring Shooting star award alongside Daniel Schmidt.
