= Fred Teague =

British trampoline gymnast (born 2006)

Personal information
- Born: 22 July 2006 (age 19) Maidstone, Kent, United Kingdom

Sport
- Sport: Tumbling (sport)
Medal record
Men's trampoline gymnastics
Representing Great Britain
World Games
Bronze medal – third place	2025 Chengdu	Tumbling
World Championships
Silver medal – second place	2023 Birmingham	Tumbling team
Bronze medal – third place	2023 Birmingham	All-around mixed team
European Championships
Silver medal – second place	2024 Guimarães	Tumbling team

Fred Teague (born 22 July 2006) is a British athlete who competes in trampoline gymnastics. Fred is a member of Andover Gymnastics club.

== Career ==
In 2021, Teague reached the tumbling finals in the 15-16 age group at the 28th FIG Trampoline Gymnastics World Age Group Competitions in Baku, Azerbaijan. He finished in third place with 34.100 points. In 2022, Teague won a silver medal at the Trampoline, Tumbling and DMT World Age Group Championships in Sofia, Bulgaria.
