= William Cowen (gymnast) =

British trampoline gymnast (born 2003)

Personal information
- Born: 2003 (age 22–23) Reading, Berkshire, United Kingdom

Sport
- Sport: Trampolining

William Cowen (born 2003 in Reading) is a British athlete who competes in trampoline gymnastics. Cowen comes from Wokingham.

== Awards ==
Trampoline Gymnastics World Championships
| Year | Place | Medal | Type |
|---|---|---|---|
| 2021 | Baku (Azerbaijan) | Bronze | All-around Team |
| 2023 | Birmingham (UK) | Silver | Tumbling Team |
European Championship
| Year | Place | Medal | Type |
| 2024 | Guimarães (Portugal) | Silver | Tumbling Team |
