= Jaydon Paddock =

British trampoline gymnast (born 2001)

Personal information
- Born: 8 July 2001 (age 24) Walsall, United Kingdom

Sport
- Sport: Trampolining

Jaydon Paddock (born 8 July 2001 in Walsall) is a British athlete who competes in trampoline gymnastics.

Paddock attended Wood Green Academy in Wednesbury.

He most recently won a bronze medal at the 2023 Trampoline Gymnastics World Championships.

== Awards ==
Trampoline Gymnastics World Championships
Year	Place	Medal	Type
2019	Tokyo (Japan)	Gold	Tumbling Team
2021	Baku (Azerbaijan)	Silver	Tumbling Team
2022	Sofía (Bulgaria)	Gold	Tumbling Team
2023	Birmingham (UK)	Bronze	Tumbling
2023	Birmingham (UK)	Silver	Tumbling Team
European Championship
Year	Place	Medal	Type
2022	Rímini (Italy)	Gold	Tumbling Team
2024	Guimarães (Portugal)	Silver	Tumbling Team
