= Andrew Stamp =

British trampoline gymnast

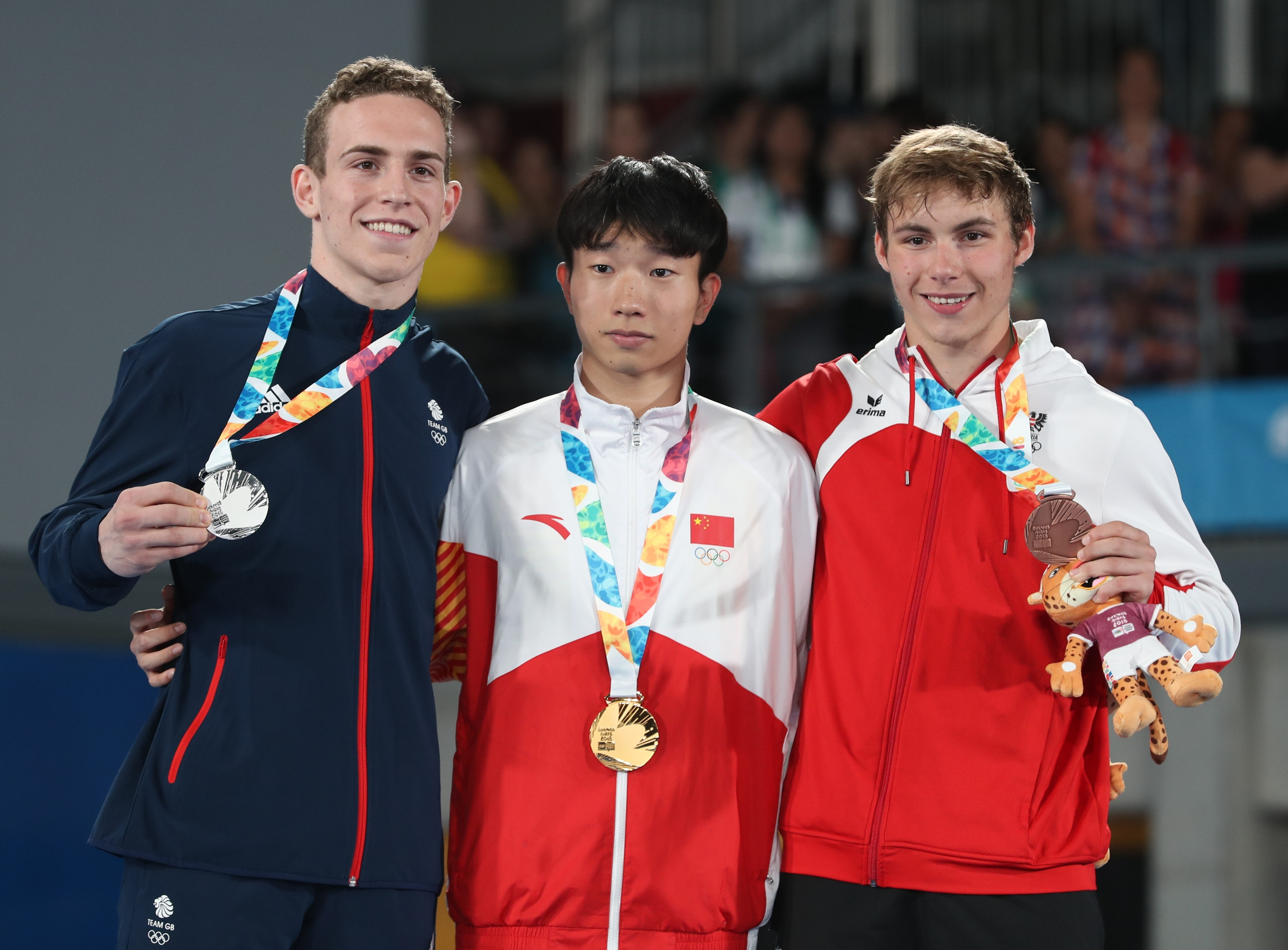
- Stamp (left) at the 2018 Youth Olympic Games

Personal information
- Born: 2001 (age 24–25) Kettering, Northamptonshire, United Kingdom

Gymnastics career
- Discipline: Trampoline gymnastics
- Country represented: Great Britain
- Club: Northamptonshire Trampoline Gymnastics Academy
- Head coach: Harvey Smith
- Retired: 28 May 2025
Medal record
Men's trampoline gymnastics
Representing Great Britain
World Championships
| Gold medal – first place | 2022 Sofia | All-around Team |
| Bronze medal – third place | 2023 Birmingham | Individual team |
| Bronze medal – third place | 2023 Birmingham | All-around Team |
Youth Olympic Games
| Silver medal – second place | 2018 Buenos Aires | Individual |
Junior European Championships
| Silver medal – second place | 2018 Baku | Team |
| Bronze medal – third place | 2018 Baku | Individual |

Andrew Stamp (born 2001) is a retired British trampoline gymnast. Stamp competed at the 2018 Youth Olympics in Buenos Aires where he won a historic silver medal in the boys' individual competition; the first Youth Olympic Games trampoline medal for Great Britain.
