= Daniel Berridge =

British trampoline gymnast (born 1995)

Personal information
- Born: 1995 (age 30–31) Kettering, United Kingdom

Sport
- Sport: Trampolining

Daniel Berridge (born 1995 in Kettering) is a British athlete who competes in trampoline gymnastics.

He won bronze medals at the Trampoline Gymnastics World Championships in 2021 and 2023.

== Awards ==
Trampoline Gymnastics World Championships
Year	Place	Medal	Type
2021	Baku (Azerbaijan)	Bronze	All-around Team
2023	Birmingham (UK)	Bronze	Double Mini Team
