= Grace Harder =

American trampoline gymnast

Personal information
- Born: December 16, 2004 (age 21) Virginia, USA

Sport
- Sport: Trampolining
Medal record
Women's trampoline gymnastics
Representing the United States
World Games
Silver medal – second place	2025 Chengdu	Double mini
World Championships
Gold medal – first place	2025 Pamplona	Double Mini Team
Gold medal – first place	2026 Nanjing	Double Mini Team
Bronze medal – third place	2023 Birmingham	Double mini

Grace Harder (born December 16, 2004) is an American athlete who competes in trampoline gymnastics. She won a bronze medal at the World Trampoline Gymnastics Championships in 2023.

Harder is the younger sister of fellow trampolinist Trevor Harder. Both Trevor and Grace qualified for the 2021 U.S. Olympic Team Trials and USA Gymnastics National Championships.

Harder started gymnastics when she was nine years old. She competed at the 2025 World Games.
