= Robert Vilarasau =

Spanish trampoline gymnast (born 2001)

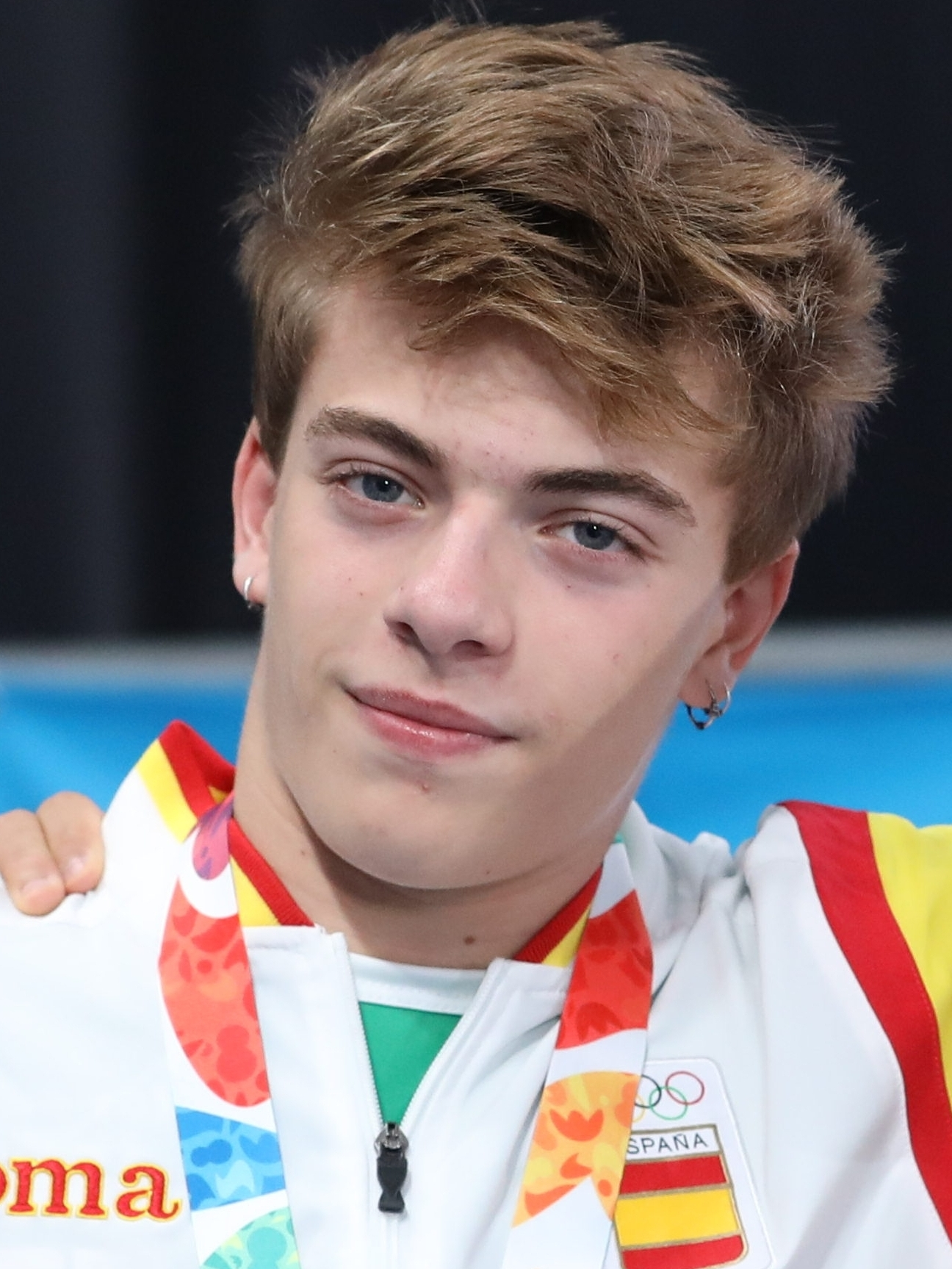
- Robert Vilarasau in 2018

Personal information
- Born: 7 August 2001 (age 24) Artés, Catalonia, Spain

Sport
- Sport: Trampolining

Robert Vilarasau Poveda (born 7 August 2001) is a Spanish athlete who competes in trampoline gymnastics.

He won a silver medal at the 2023 Trampoline Gymnastics World Championships and a bronze medal at the 2024 European Trampoline Championships, both in the team event.

== Awards ==
World Championship
Year	Place	Medal	Type
2023	Birmingham (United Kingdom)	Silver	Equipment
European Championship
Year	Place	Medal	Type
2024	Guimarães (Portugal)	Bronze	Equipment
Junior European Championship
Year	Place	Medal	Type
2018	Baku (Azerbaijan)	Silver	Double Mini Team
