= 2022 European Trampoline Championships =

2022 European Championships
- Venue: Rimini Fiera
- Location: Rimini, Italy
- Dates: 1 June to 5 June 2022
- Competitors: 207 from 25 nations

The 2022 European Trampoline Championships was held from 1 June to 5 June 2022 in Rimini, Italy.

== Medal summary ==
=== Seniors ===
Event	Gold	Silver	Bronze
Men
Individual Trampoline	Allan Morante (FRA)	Pierre Gouzou (FRA)	Anton Davydenko (UKR)
Synchro	Germany; Fabian Vogel; Matthias Pfleiderer	Portugal; Diogo Abreu; Pedro Ferreira	Greece; Nikolaos Savvidis; Marios Grapsas
Trampoline Team	France; Florestan Riou; Pierre Gouzou; Morgan Demiro-O-Domiro; Allan Morante	Portugal; Diogo Abreu; Pedro Ferreira; Lucas Santos; Ruben Tavares	Great Britain; Tyler Cole-Dyer; Rhys Northover; Zak Perzamanos; Andrew Stamp
Double Mini	David Franco (SPA)	Lewis Gosling (GBR)	Andrés Martínez (SPA)
Double Mini Team	Spain; Andrés Martínez; David Franco; Nicolas Toribio; Carlos Del Ser	Belgium; Kobe Antheunis; Aaron Kusdemir; Wannes Geens; Jesse Croonenberghs	Great Britain; Omo Aikeremiokha; Marshall Frost; Lewis Gosling; Otis McAuliffe
Tumbling	Rasmus Steffensen (DEN)	Mikhail Malkin (AZE)	Adam Matthiesen (DEN)
Tumbling Team	Great Britain; Ramarni Levena; Jaydon Paddock; Kristof Willerton; Lewis Westwood	Denmark; Johannes Soemod; Martin Abildgaard; Adam Matthiesen; Rasmus Steffensen	Azerbaijan; Mikhail Malkin; Adil Hajiada; Tofig Aliyev
Women
Individual Trampoline	Bryony Page (GBR)	Luba Golovina (GEO)	Léa Labrousse (FRA)
Synchro	Great Britain; Bryony Page; Isabelle Songhurst	Netherlands; Romana Schuring; Niamh Slattery	Georgia; Anano Apakidze; Teona Janjgava
Trampoline Team	Spain; Noemi Romero Rosario; Melania Rodriguez; Marina Chavarria; Erica Sanz Ginés	Georgia; Teona Janjgava; Luba Golovina; Anano Apakidze; Sophio Dashniani	Germany; Fiona Schneider; Luka Kristien Frey; Gabriela Stoehr; Leonie Adam
Double Mini	Kirsty Way (GBR)	Lina Sjöberg (SWE)	Diana Gago (POR)
Double Mini Team	Great Britain; Kim Beattie; Madeleine Tarrant; Kirsty Way; Bethany Williamson	Portugal; Diana Gago; Sara Guido; Maria Carvalho; Rita Abrantes	Spain; Melania Rodriguez; Erica Sanz Ginés; Alejandra Brana; Aintzane Dapena
Tumbling	Candy Brière-Vetillard (FRA)	Megan Kealy (GBR)	Megan Surman (GBR)
Tumbling Team	France; Emilie Wambote; Marie Deloge; Maelle Dumitru-Marin; Candy Brière-Vetillard	Great Britain; Demi Adams; Jessica Brain; Megan Kealy; Megan Surman	Belgium; Laura Vandevoorde; Tachina Peeters; Evi Milh; Sofie Rubbrecht

== Medals ==
=== Total ===
* Host nation (Italy)

Rank	Nation	Gold	Silver	Bronze	Total
1	Great Britain	12	5	3	20
2	France	4	4	2	10
3	Spain	4	0	3	7
4	Azerbaijan	2	1	1	4
5	Georgia	1	3	1	5
6	Belgium	1	2	1	4
7	Denmark	1	1	2	4
7	Germany	1	1	2	4
9	Italy*	1	0	1	2
10	Portugal	0	4	3	7
11	Netherlands	0	2	0	2
12	Ukraine	0	1	4	5
13	Bulgaria	0	1	2	3
14	Greece	0	1	1	2
14	Sweden	0	1	1	2
Totals (15 entries)		27	27	27	81
