= Megan Kealy =

British trampoline gymnast (born 2000)

- Born: 24 January 2000 (age 26) Chertsey, Surrey, United Kingdom

Gymnastics career
- Discipline: Trampoline gymnastics
- Country represented: Great Britain
- Club: Spelthorne Gymnastics
- Head coaches: Kath & Rob Small
Medal record
Women's Tumbling
Representing Great Britain
World Games
| Gold medal – first place | 2025 Chengdu | Tumbling |
World Championships
| Gold medal – first place | 2019 Tokyo | Tumbling Team |
| Gold medal – first place | 2021 Baku | Tumbling |
| Gold medal – first place | 2023 Birmingham | Tumbling Team |
| Gold medal – first place | 2022 Sofia | Tumbling Team |
| Gold medal – first place | 2022 Sofia | All-around Team |
| Silver medal – second place | 2023 Birmingham | Tumbling |
| Silver medal – second place | 2025 Pamplona | Tumbling Team |
| Bronze medal – third place | 2019 Tokyo | Tumbling |
| Bronze medal – third place | 2021 Baku | Tumbling Team |
| Bronze medal – third place | 2021 Baku | All-around Team |
| Bronze medal – third place | 2025 Pamplona | All-Around Team |
European Championships
| Gold medal – first place | 2018 Baku | Tumbling Team |
| Gold medal – first place | 2024 Guimarães | Tumbling Team |
| Silver medal – second place | 2018 Baku | Tumbling |
| Silver medal – second place | 2022 Rimini | Tumbling |
| Silver medal – second place | 2022 Rimini | Tumbling Team |

Megan Kealy (born 2000) is a British trampoline gymnast.

== Career ==
Kealy competed at the 2019 Trampoline Gymnastics World Championships where she won a gold medal tumbling team event and a bronze medal in the individual competition.

She competed at the 2021 World Championships where she won a bronze medal in the tumbling team event and a gold medal in the individual tumbling competition.

She competed at the 2022 Trampoline Gymnastics World Championships where she won a gold medal in the tumbling team and the all-around team events.
