= Alejandra Braña =

Spanish trampoline gymnast (born 2004)

Personal information
- Born: 2004 (age 20–21); Ourense, Spain

Sport
- Sport: Trampolining

Alejandra Braña (born 2004) is a Spanish athlete who competes in trampoline gymnastics. She won a bronze medal at the 2024 European Trampoline Championships.

== Awards ==
European Championship
Year	Place	Medal	Type
2024	Guimarães (Portugal)	Bronze	Equipment
