= Saskia Servini =

British trampoline gymnast (born 2001)

Personal information
- Born: 2001 (age 24–25) Winchester, United Kingdom

Sport
- Sport: Trampolining

Saskia Servini (born 2001) is a British athlete who competes in trampoline gymnastics. She trains at Andover Gymnastics Club.

== Career ==
Servini competed at the 2024 European Trampoline Championships and won a gold medal.

== Awards ==
World Championship
Year	Place	Medal	Proof
2023	Birmingham (United Kingdom)	Bronze	Tumbling
European Championship
Year	Place	Medal	Type
2024	Guimarães (Portugal)	Gold	Tumbling Team
European Championship (junior)
Year	Place	Medal	Type
2018	Baku (Azerbaijan)	Gold	Tumbling Team
