= 2023 Trampoline Gymnastics World Championships =

2023 Trampoline World Championships
- Venue: Arena Birmingham
- Location: Birmingham, United Kingdom
- Start date: 9 November 2023
- End date: 12 November 2023
- Competitors: 353 from 41 nations

The 2023 Trampoline Gymnastics World Championships event was held in Arena Birmingham, Birmingham, England from 9 to 12 November 2023. The event was a major qualification event for the 2024 Summer Olympics.

== Participating nations ==
- Algeria (2)
- Argentina (4)
- Australia (23)
- Austria (4)
- Azerbaijan (5)
- Belgium (9)
- Bolivia (1)
- Brazil (6)
- Bulgaria (2)
- Canada (22)
- China (12)
- Colombia (2)
- Czech Republic (7)
- Denmark (12)
- Egypt (4)
- Spain (22)
- Estonia (1)
- Finland (1)
- France (14)
- Great Britain (24) (Host)
- Georgia (4)
- Germany (14)
- Greece (12)
- Hong Kong (3)
- Ireland (2)
- Italy (4)
- Japan (20)
- Kazakhstan (6)
- Latvia (1)
- Mexico (9)
- Netherlands (6)
- New Zealand (8)
- Poland (1)
- Portugal (24)
- South Africa (5)
- Switzerland (2)
- Sweden (8)
- Turkey (5)
- Ukraine (16)
- United States (24)
- Uzbekistan (2)

== Medal summary ==
Event	Gold	Silver	Bronze
Men
Individual	Yan Langyu (CHN)	Wang Zisai (CHN)	Ryusei Nishioka (JPN)
Individual Team	France; Julian Chartier; Allan Morante; Pierre Gouzou; Morgan Demiro-o-Domiro	Spain; David Vega; Jorge Martín; Robert Vilarasau; David Franco	Great Britain; Andrew Stamp; Zak Perzamanos; Corey Walkes; Peter Buravytskiy
Synchro	Germany; Caio Lauxtermann; Fabian Vogel	United States; Ruben Padilla; Aliaksei Shostak	France; Pierre Gouzou; Morgan Demiro-o-Domiro
Double Mini	Ruben Padilla (USA)	David Franco (ESP)	Tiago Sampaio Romão (POR)
Double Mini Team	United States; Tomas Minc; Simon Smith; Ruben Padilla; Dylan Kline	Spain; David Franco; Andrés Martínez; Carlos del Ser; Nicolás Toribio	Great Britain; Omo Aikeremiokha; Daniel Berridge; Lewis Gosling; Marshall Frost
Tumbling	Mikhail Malkin (AZE)	Kaden Brown (USA)	Jaydon Paddock (GBR)
Tumbling Team	Azerbaijan; Adil Hajizada; Mikhail Malkin; Tofig Aliyev; Elnur Mammadov	Great Britain; Jaydon Paddock; Kristof Willerton; William Cowen; Fred Teague	Denmark; Martin Abildgaard; Magnus Lindholmer; Mads Hansen; Jeppe Mikkelsen
Women
Individual	Bryony Page (GBR)	Zhu Xueying (CHN)	Jessica Stevens (USA)
Individual Team	China; Zhu Xueying; Fan Xinyi; Hu Yicheng; Cao Yunzhu	France; Léa Labrousse; Laura Paris; Cléa Brousse; Anaïs Brèche	Georgia; Mariam Raguimovi; Anano Apakidze; Luba Golovina; Teona Dzhandzhgava
Synchro	United States; Nicole Ahsinger; Cheyenne Webster	China; Qiu Zheng; Lin Qianqi	Great Britain; Isabelle Songhurst; Bryony Page
Double Mini	Melania Rodríguez (ESP)	Aliah Raga (USA)	Grace Harder (USA)
Double Mini Team	Great Britain; Kirsty Way; Molly McKenna; Bethany Williamson; Ruth Shevelen	Portugal; Diana Gago; Alexandra Garcia; Sara Guido; Rita Abrantes	Canada; Ashley Anaka; Zoe Phaneuf; Hannah Metheral; Kalena Soehn
Tumbling	Candy Brière-Vetillard (FRA)	Megan Kealy (GBR)	Saskia Servini (GBR)
Tumbling Team	Great Britain; Naana Oppon; Saskia Servini; Megan Kealy; Shanice Davidson	France; Maëlle Dumitru-Marin; Marie Deloge; Candy Brière-Vetillard; Maëlie Abadie	United States; Miah Bruns; Tia Taylor; Anastasia Katchalova; Hope Bravo
Mixed
All-around Team	United States; Nicole Ahsinger; Kaden Brown; Miah Bruns; Cody Gesuelli; Shelby Nobuhara; Ruben Padilla; Isaac Rowley; Aliaksei Shostak; Jessica Stevens; Cheyenne Webster	Portugal; Diogo Abreu; Mariana Carvalho; Mariana Cascalheira; Sofia Correia; Pedro Ferreira; Diana Gago; Catarina Marianito Nunes; Vasco Peso; Tiago Sampaio Romão	Great Britain; Shanice Davidson; Lewis Gosling; Bryony Page; Zak Perzamanos; Isabelle Songhurst; Andrew Stamp; Fred Teague; Corey Walkes; Kirsty Way

== Medal table ==
* Host nation (Great Britain)

Rank	Nation	Gold	Silver	Bronze	Total
1	United States	4	3	3	10
2	Great Britain*	3	2	6	11
3	China	2	3	0	5
4	France	2	2	1	5
5	Azerbaijan	2	0	0	2
6	Spain	1	3	0	4
7	Germany	1	0	0	1
8	Portugal	0	2	1	3
9	Canada	0	0	1	1
9	Denmark	0	0	1	1
9	Georgia	0	0	1	1
9	Japan	0	0	1	1
Totals (12 entries)		15	15	15	45

== Olympic qualification ==
Up to eight quota places were available in men's and women's individual trampoline, with a maximum of one per National Olympic Committee in each sex.

The following NOCs qualified a trampoline gymnast for the 2024 Summer Olympics:

Men's individual	Women's individual
China; Great Britain; Austria; Japan; Portugal	China; Great Britain; Brazil; Canada; United States
