= Lucas Santos (gymnast) =

Portuguese trampoline gymnast

Personal information
- Born: 26 September 2002 (age 23) Benavente, Portugal

Sport
- Sport: Trampolining
Medal record
Men's trampoline gymnastics
Representing Portugal
World Games
Gold medal – first place	2025 Chengdu	Synchro
World Championships
Gold medal – first place	2022 Sofia	Team
Bronze medal – third place	2025 Pamplona	Team
European Championships
Silver medal – second place	2021 Sochi	Synchro
Silver medal – second place	2021 Sochi	Team
Silver medal – second place	2022 Rimini	Team
Bronze medal – third place	2024 Guimarães	Synchro
Bronze medal – third place	2026 Portimão	Team

Lucas Santos (born 26 September 2002) is a Portuguese athlete who competes in trampoline gymnastics.

He won a gold medal at the 2022 Trampoline Gymnastics World Championships and four medals at the European Trampoline Championships, between 2021 and 2024.
