= 2021 Trampoline Gymnastics World Championships =

2021 Trampoline World Championships
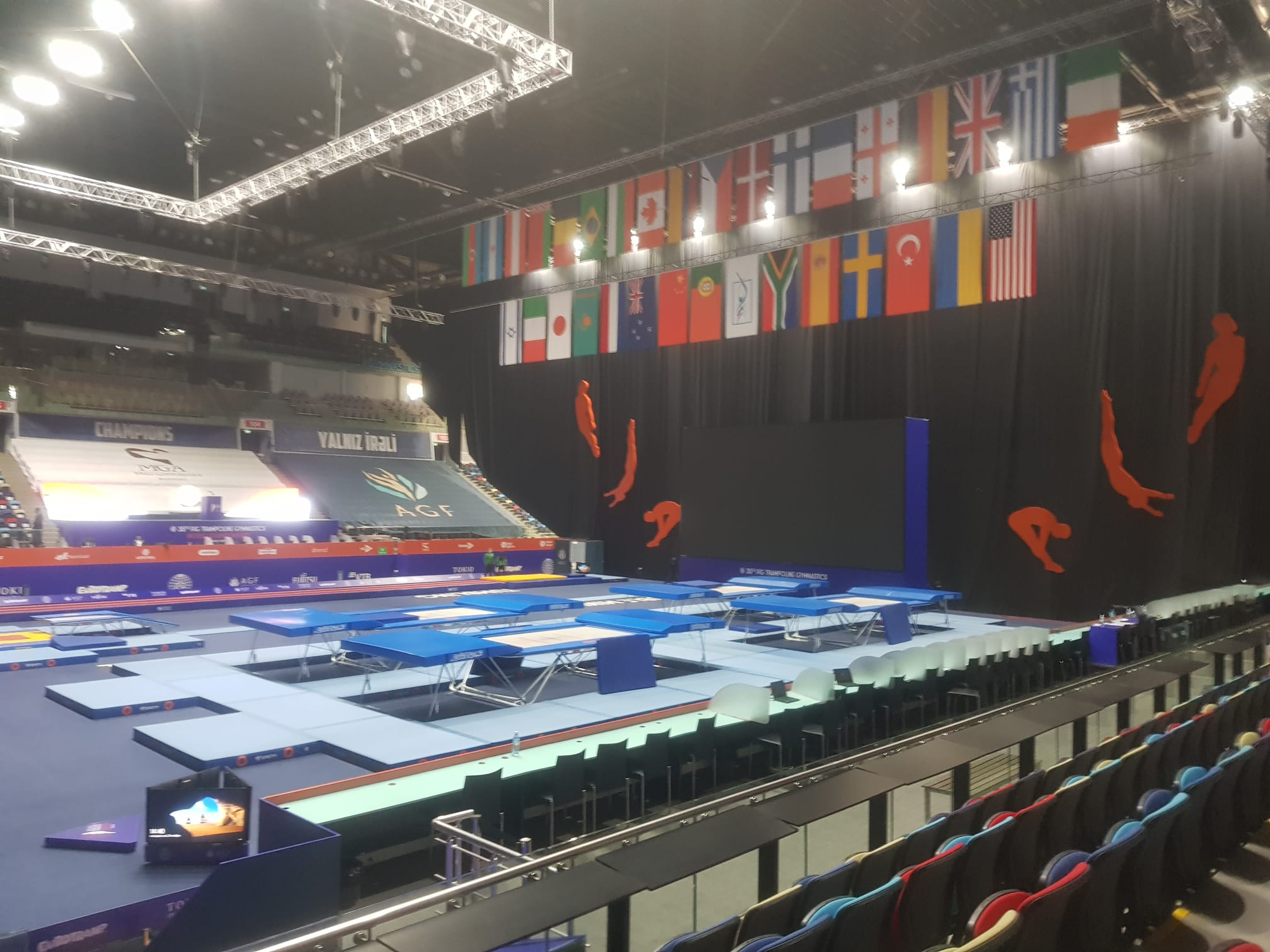
- Venue: National Gymnastics Arena
- Location: Baku, Azerbaijan
- Start date: 18 November 2021
- End date: 21 November 2021
- Competitors: 260 from 33 nations

The 2021 Trampoline Gymnastics World Championships were held from 18 to 21 November 2021 in the National Gymnastics Arena in Baku, Azerbaijan.

== Participating nations ==
- Argentina (2)
- Austria (2)
- Azerbaijan (1)
- Belarus (8)
- Belgium (7)
- Brazil (5)
- Bulgaria (3)
- Canada (14)
- China (13)
- Colombia (6)
- Czech Republic (1)
- Denmark (8)
- Finland (2)
- France (12)
- Georgia (1)
- Germany (5)
- Great Britain (23)
- Greece (5)
- Ireland (1)
- Israel (1)
- Italy (4)
- Japan (15)
- Kazakhstan (4)
- Netherlands (6)
- New Zealand (2)
- Portugal (22)
- RGF (Note: Under the Court of Arbitration for Sport ban, Russia may not use its name, flag, or anthem and must present themselves as "Neutral Athlete" or "Neutral Team" at any world championships until December 16, 2022. Thus, Russian gymnasts competed under a flag of the Russian Gymnastics Federation and the name "RGF" at the 2021 World Championships.) (27)
- South Africa (3)
- Spain (14)
- Sweden (5)
- Turkey (3)
- Ukraine (15)
- United States (20)

== Medal summary ==
Event	Gold	Silver	Bronze
Men
Individual	Yan Langyu (CHN)	Ryusei Nishioka (JPN)	Aleh Rabtsau (BLR)
Individual Team	Belarus; Ivan Litvinovich; Aleh Rabtsau; Andrei Builou; Aliaksei Dudarau	Japan; Ryosuke Sakai; Hiroto Unno; Ryusei Nishioka; Ryonosuke Nomura	RGF; Mikhail Melnik; Nikita Fedorenko; Dmitrii Ushakov; Kirill Panteleev
Synchro	Belarus; Andrei Builou; Aleh Rabtsau	Germany; Fabian Vogel; Matthias Pfleiderer	France; Josuah Faroux; Pierre Gouzou
Double Mini	Vasilii Makarskii (RGF)	Diogo Cabral (POR)	Ruben Padilla (USA)
Double Mini Team	RGF; Aleksandr Odintsov; Vasilii Makarskii; Mikhail Zalomin; Mikhail Iurev	Portugal; Diogo Fernandes; Diogo Cabral; Tiago Romão; André Nunes	Spain; David Franco; Carlos del Ser; Andrés Martínez; Santiago Brea
Tumbling	Aleksandr Lisitsyn (RGF)	Mikhail Malkin (AZE)	Kaden Brown (USA)
Tumbling Team	RGF; Aleksei Svetlishnikov; Vadim Afanasev; Aleksandr Lisitsyn; Maksim Riabikov	Great Britain; Jaydon Paddock; William Cowen; Kristof Willerton; Elliott Browne	Denmark; Martin Abildgaard; Magnus Lindholmer; Adam Matthiesen; Johannes Sømod
Women
Individual	Bryony Page (GBR)	Cao Yunzhu (CHN)	Iana Lebedeva (RGF)
Individual Team	Japan; Reina Satake; Hikaru Mori; Yumi Takagi; Narumi Tamura	China; Fan Xinyi; Huang Yanfei; Cao Yunzhu; Lin Qianqi	RGF; Irina Kundius; Mariia Mikhailova; Iana Lebedeva; Anna Kornetskaya
Synchro	China; Hu Yicheng; Zhang Xinxin	Japan; Narumi Tamura; Hikaru Mori	Portugal; Catarina Nunes; Beatriz Martins
Double Mini	Lina Sjöberg (SWE)	Shelby Nobuhara (USA)	Melania Rodríguez (ESP)
Double Mini Team	United States; Trinity van Natta; Shelby Nobuhara; Tristan van Natta; Lacey Jenkins	RGF; Dana Sadkova; Daria Nespanova; Aleksandra Bonartseva; Alina Kuznetcova	Canada; Zoe Phaneuf; Hannah Brown; Gabriella Flynn
Tumbling	Megan Kealy (GBR)	Lucie Tumoine (FRA)	Tachina Peeters (BEL)
Tumbling Team	France; Emilie Wambote; Lucie Tumoine; Candy Brière-Vetillard; Maëlle Dumitru-Marin	Belgium; Laura Vandevoorde; Louise van Regenmortel; Tachina Peeters; Sofie Rubbrecht	Great Britain; Ashleigh Owen; Megan Surman; Megan Kealy; Louisa Maher
Mixed
All-around Team	RGF; Aleksandra Bonartseva; Anna Kornetskaya; Iana Lebedeva; Aleksandr Lisitsyn; Mikhail Melnik; Kirill Panteleev; Irina Silicheva; Dmitry Ushakov; Mikhail Zalomin	United States; Maia Amano; Kaden Brown; Cody Gesuelli; Ruben Padilla; Isaac Rowley; Jessica Stevens; Tia Taylor; Tristan van Natta	Great Britain; Daniel Berridge; Louise Brownsey; William Cowen; Megan Kealy; Rhys Northover; Bryony Page; Zak Perzamanos; Corey Walkes; Bethany Williamson

== Medal table ==
* Host nation (Azerbaijan)

Rank	Nation	Gold	Silver	Bronze	Total
1	RGF	5	1	3	9
2	China	2	2	0	4
3	Great Britain	2	1	2	5
4	Belarus	2	0	1	3
5	Japan	1	3	0	4
6	United States	1	2	2	5
7	France	1	1	1	3
8	Sweden	1	0	0	1
9	Portugal	0	2	1	3
10	Belgium	0	1	1	2
11	Azerbaijan*	0	1	0	1
11	Germany	0	1	0	1
13	Spain	0	0	2	2
14	Canada	0	0	1	1
14	Denmark	0	0	1	1
Totals (15 entries)		15	15	15	45
