= David Franco (gymnast) =

Spanish trampoline gymnast (born 2002)

Personal information
- Born: 13 October 2002 (age 23) Valladolid, Spain

Sport
- Sport: Trampolining

David Franco (born 13 October 2002) is a Spanish athlete who competes in trampoline gymnastics.

Franco won four medals at the Trampoline Gymnastics World Championships between the years 2021 and 2023, and two gold medals at the 2022 European Trampoline Championships.

== Results ==
World Championship
Year	Place	Medal	Type
2021	Baku (Azerbaijan)	Bronze	Team double mini
2022	Sofia (Bulgaria)	Gold	Team double mini
2023	Birmingham (UK)	Silver	Team trampoline
2023	Birmingham (UK)	Silver	Team double mini
European Championship
Year	Place	Medal	Type
2022	Rímini (Italy)	Gold	Individual double mini
2022	Rímini (Italy)	Gold	Team double mini
Junior European Championship
Year	Place	Medal	Type
2018	Baku (Azerbaijan)	Silver	Double Mini Team
