= Sanz (surname) =

Sanz is a Spanish surname. Notable people with the surname include:

- Ainara Sanz (born 1995), Spanish professional racing cyclist
- Aitor Sanz (born 1984), Spanish professional footballer
- Alejandro Sanz (born 1968), Spanish pop musician
- Ángel Sanz Briz (1910–1980), Spanish diplomat
- Antonio Sanz (born 1968), Spanish lawyer and politician
- Carlos Sanz, American actor
- Crickette Sanz, American scientist
- Diana Sanz Ginés (born 2005), Spanish gymnast
- Erica Sanz Ginés (born 2003), Spanish gymnast
- Enrique Sanz (born 1989), Spanish professional cyclist
- Ernesto Sanz (born 1956), Argentine politician
- Esther Sanz Selva (born 1985), Spanish politician
- Fernand Sanz (1881–1925), French cyclist
- Fernando Sanz (born 1974), Spanish footballer
- Francisco Javier Sanz Alonso (1952–2022), Spanish chess master
- Francisco Sanz, Spanish actor
- Francisco Sanz Fernández (born 1952), Spanish politician
- Gaël Sanz (born 1977), French football defender
- Gaspar Sanz (1640–1710), Spanish composer and priest
- Henri Sanz (born 1963), French rugby union player
- Horatio Sanz (born 1969), Chilean-born American actor and comedian
- Ignacio Sanz (born 1955), Spanish Olympic judoka
- Jacobo Sanz Ovejero (born 1983), Spanish footballer
- Javier Sanz (born 1953), Spanish sprint canoer
- Jenna Sanz-Agero (born 1969), American singer
- Jesús María Sanz-Serna (born 1953), Spanish mathematician
- Jorge Sanz (born 1969), Spanish actor
- Jorge Sanz (basketball) (born 1993), Spanish basketball player
- José Sanz, several people
- Laia Sanz (born 1985), Spanish sportswoman
- Lorenzo Sanz (1943–2020), Spanish businessman
- Mariano Sanz (born 1989), Spanish footballer
- Marta Sanz (born 1967), Spanish writer
- Marta Sanz-Solé (born 1952), Spanish mathematician
- Miguel José Sanz (1756–1814), Venezuelan lawyer and journalist
- Miguel Sanz (born 1952), Spanish politician
- Paul L. Oostburg Sanz (born 1969), United States General Counsel of the Navy
- Pedro Sanz Alonso (born 1953), Spanish politician
- Peter Sanz (1680–1747), Catalan Dominican friar
- Rita Sanz-Agero (born 1991), modern pentathlete from Guatemala
- Rocío Sanz Quirós (1934–1993), Costa Rican composer
- Rubén Sanz (born 1980), Spanish professional footballer
- Salvador López Sanz (1924–2009), Spanish politician
- Santiago Sanz, several people
- Vidal Francisco Soberón Sanz (born 1953), admiral of the Mexican Navy
- Victor Sanz, American country music singer
