= Ginés =

Ginés is a Spanish personal name. It is the form of the Roman name "Genesius". People with this name include:

- Ginés de la Jara, Spanish saint of the Early Middle Ages
- Ginés González García (1945–2024), Minister of Health and Environment of Argentina
- Ginés Pérez de Hita (1544-ca. 1605), Spanish novelist and poet
- Ginés de Mafra (1493-1546), Spanish explorer
- Ginés Pérez de la Parra (ca. 1548-1600), Valencian composer
- Diana Sanz Ginés (born 2005), Spanish gymnast
- Erica Sanz Ginés (born 2003), Spanish gymnast
- Loreto Tuñón Ginés (born 2007), Spanish gymnast

== See also ==
- San Ginés (disambiguation)
