= 1973 Copa del Generalísimo final =

Copa del Generalísimo 1973 final
- Event: 1972–73 Copa del Generalísimo
Athletic Bilbao	Castellón
2	0
- Date: 29 June 1973
- Venue: Vicente Calderón, Madrid
- Referee: Mariano Medina Iglesias
- Attendance: 64,200

The Copa del Generalísimo 1973 final was the 71st final of what would be called the Copa del Rey ("The King's Cup") after the death of Generalissimo Francisco Franco. The final was played at Vicente Calderón Stadium in Madrid, on 29 June 1973, being won by Athletic Bilbao, who beat Castellón 2–0.

== Match details ==
29 June 1973
20:30 CET

Athletic Bilbao	2–0	Castellón
Arieta 27'; Zubiaga 54'	Report

Vicente Calderón Stadium, Madrid
Attendance: 64,200
Referee: Mariano Medina Iglesias

Athletic Bilbao

Castellón

GK	1	(Spain) José Ángel Iribar
DF	2	(Spain) Iñaki Sáez (c)
DF	3	(Spain) José Larrauri
DF	4	(Spain) Félix Zubiaga	(substituted off) 72'
DF	5	(Spain) Agustín Guisasola
MF	6	(Spain) José Ángel Rojo
MF	7	(Spain) José Lasa
MF	8	(Spain) Ángel María Villar
FW	9	(Spain) Fidel Uriarte
FW	10	(Spain) Txetxu Rojo
FW	11	(Spain) Antón Arieta	(substituted off) 74'
Substitutes:
DF	12	(Spain) Jesús Aranguren	(substituted on) 72'
FW	14	(Spain) Carlos Ruiz	(substituted on) 74'
Manager:
(Socialist Federal Republic of Yugoslavia) Milorad Pavić

GK	1	(Spain) Pedro Corral
DF	2	(Spain) Manuel Figueirido
DF	3	(Spain) Cela (c)
DF	4	(Spain) José Ferrer	(yellow card) 24'	(substituted off) 77'
DF	5	(Spain) Óscar
DF	6	(Spain) Pascual Babiloni
MF	7	(Spain) Tonín
MF	8	(Spain) Vicente del Bosque
MF	9	(Spain) Félix
MF	10	(Spain) Juan Planelles
FW	11	(Spain) Manuel Clares		(substituted off) 46'
Substitutes:
FW	12	(Spain) Fernando Ortuño		(substituted on) 46'
MF	14	(Spain) Jorge Cayuela		(substituted on) 77'
Manager:
(France) Lucien Muller
