= 1948 Copa del Generalísimo final =

Copa del Generalísimo 1948 final
- Event: 1947-48 Copa del Generalísimo
| Sevilla | Celta Vigo |
| 4 | 1 |
- Date: 4 July 1948
- Venue: Estadio Chamartín, Madrid
- Referee: Agustín Vilalta
- Attendance: 55,000

The Copa del Generalísimo 1948 final was the 46th final of the King's Cup. The final was played at Estadio Chamartín in Madrid, on 4 July 1948, being won by Sevilla CF, who beat RC Celta de Vigo 4–1.

== Match details ==
4 July 1948
18:15 CET

| Sevilla | 4–1 | Celta Vigo |
|---|---|---|
| Mariano 18', 59', 73'; Arza 75' | Report (in Spanish) | Muñoz 6' |

Estadio Chamartín, Madrid
Attendance: 55,000
Referee: Agustín Vilalta

Sevilla

Celta de Vigo

| GK | 1 | (Spain) José María Busto |
| DF | 2 | (Spain) Joaquín (c) |
| DF | 3 | (Spain) Manuel Belmonte |
| MF | 4 | (Spain) Pedro Alconero |
| MF | 5 | (Spain) Francisco Antúnez |
| MF | 6 | (Spain) Pedro Eguiluz |
| FW | 7 | (Spain) José Pineda |
| FW | 8 | (Spain) Juan Arza |
| FW | 9 | (Spain) Mariano |
| FW | 10 | (Spain) Manuel Doménech |
| FW | 11 | (Spain) José Campos |
Manager:
(Spain) Patricio Caicedo

| GK | 1 | (Spain) Francisco Simón Calvet |
| DF | 2 | (Spain) José Mesa |
| DF | 3 | (Spain) Cabiño |
| MF | 4 | (Spain) Gaitos |
| MF | 5 | (Spain) Gabriel Alonso |
| MF | 6 | (Spain) Santiago Sanz |
| FW | 7 | (Spain) Francisco Roig (c) |
| FW | 8 | (Spain) Miguel Muñoz |
| FW | 9 | (Spain) Pahiño |
| FW | 10 | (Spain) Juan Rodríguez Aretio |
| FW | 11 | (Spain) Juan Vázquez |
Manager:
(Spain) Ricardo Zamora
