= Yayo (footballer, born 1914) =

Spanish footballer and manager

Santiago Sanz
Personal information
- Full name: Santiago Sanz Fraile
- Date of birth: 15 May 1914
- Place of birth: Santander, Cantabria, Spain
- Date of death: 8 May 1990 (aged 75)
- Place of death: Spain
- Position: Midfielder

Senior career*
Years	Team	Apps	(Gls)
1933–1934	Rayo Cantabria		
1934–1936	Racing de Santander	3	(0)
1940–1942	Salamanca		
1942–1952	Celta de Vigo	145	(10)
Total		148	(10)

Managerial career
- 1949: CD Casablanca
- 1951: Pontevedra
- 1952: Celta de Vigo
- 1954–1957: Gran Peña
- 1957: Racing de Ferrol
- 1957–1959: Gran Peña
- 1959–1960: Club Zeltia
- 1960–1961: Celta de Vigo
- 1961–1963: Calvo Sotelo
- 1963–1965: Compostela
- 1965: Club Turista
- 1966–1969: Compostela
- 1969–1971: Langreo
- 1972–1973: Gran Peña
- 1973–1974: Compostela
- 1974–1976: Gran Peña
- 1979–1980: Gran Peña
- * Club domestic league appearances and goals

Santiago Sanz Fraile, also known as Yayo (15 May 1914 – 8 May 1990), was a Spanish footballer who played as a midfielder for Celta de Vigo between 1942 and 1952. He later worked as a manager.

His son of the same name played for Celta in the early 1980s.

== Playing career ==
=== Early career ===
Born on 15 May 1914 in the Cantabrian town of Santander, Sanz began his football career at his hometown club Rayo Cantabria, from which he joined Racing de Santander in 1934, making his official debut with the first team in a La Liga fixture against Arenas de Getxo on 3 February 1935, which ended in a goalless draw.

This was his only league appearance that season, but he managed to improve in the following season, as he played two league matches, but his career was then interrupted by the outbreak of the Spanish Civil War in 1936, during which he was arrested and taken into the El Dueso prison for the simple fact that he was an open-minded person capable of assimilating all kinds of opinions and dialogue. His passion for football led him to organize matches between rival gangs and inmates from different prison blocks, acting as a trainer, referee and sometimes he even wrote complaints to the bailiff about the ball's condition. Even though he had been initially sentenced to just one year in prison, he ended up staying there for the three years that the War lasted, so he then attempted to negotiate the exchange of those two extra years with the ones he would soon have to serve in the military, but the judge did not allow it.

=== Celta de Vigo ===
Once the conflict was over, Yayo joined the second division team Salamanca, with whom he played for two years, from 1940 until 1942, scoring 15 goals in 42 league, including two hat-tricks against Barakaldo and Sporting de Gijón. He thus became a highly valued player sought after by the big clubs, such as Real Zaragoza and Celta de Vigo, but in the end, he was signed by the latter team, making his debut for Celta in a 0–1 loss to Espanyol on 27 September 1942. In his first season at the club, he played 24 out of 26 league matches, and in the 1944–45 season, he was the only player to feature in every league match for Celta, including the 4–1 victory over Granada in the promotion play-off, thus returning to the top-flight, from which they did not left for the next 14 years.

Together with Juan Rodríguez Aretio, Pahiño, and Juan Vázquez, he was a member of the Celta team coached by Ricardo Zamora that reached the final of the 1948 Spanish Cup, which still is the club's only Copa del Rey final appearance, but they lost 1–4 to Sevilla FC, courtesy of a hat-trick from Mariano Uceda. He remained loyal to Celta for a decade, from 1942 until 1952, always as an undisputed starter, except for the 1946–47 season due to an injury. In total, he scored 10 goals in 145 La Liga matches for Celta.

In his final season at the club, Yayo was the subject of a tribute in a match against Real Madrid at Balaídos. He was later awarded with Celta's gold and diamond insignia by the club's president and with the Medal of Merit by the Spanish Football Federation.

== Managerial career ==
Yayo began his managerial career while still contractually linked to Celta as a player, when he briefly served at the helm of CD Casablanca in 1949. He also oversaw Pontevedra for a few months in 1951, and in his final season at Celta, he worked as a player-coach, playing only one league match, curiously against his former club Racing and in which he sustained an injury in the fifth minute of the match, and later overseeing the team alongside Roberto Ozores following the resignation of Luis Pasarín, with whom he salvaged a disastrous first half of the season, leading Celta to a 9th place finish. Their great work, however, was not enough to convince Celta to reward either of them with continued employment, so Yayo then went to Gran Peña in 1954, which he led into a promotion to the Tercera División in 1956. In April 1957, he became the coach of Racing de Ferrol, then in the second division, replacing his former teammate Juan Vázquez, who had died. With only 8 games to go, he managed to take the team out of the relegazion zone, but at the end of the season, he returned to the Gran Peña, where he remained until his dismissal in October 1959.

After a brief stint at Club Zeltia, Sanz became Celta's fourth coach of the 1959–60 season alone, but he managed to overcome the club's turmoil and, in the following season, led the club to a runner-up finish in the second division, although the team then lost the promotion play-offs to Real Valladolid. In the following season, he again led Celta into the promotion play-off, but lost again, this time to CA Osasuna. Even though he nearly returning Celta to the top flight with barely any money invested in signings, the club's president had to dismiss because "he had an unfavorable environment".

In December 1961, he moved to Puertollano, where he took over Calvo Sotelo (currently known as CD Puertollano), which he guided to back-to-back first places, but without achieving promotion. In July 1963, he replaced Dagoberto Moll as the coach of third division team Compostela, which he led for two years, until 1965, when he took over Club Turista, but returned to Compostela a few months later, in November 1965, as technical secretary, but soon became its coach again from 1966 until 1969.

In 1969, Sanz signed for UP Langreo, and in his first season there, he achieved promotion to the Second Division, but in his second season, he was dismissed with five rounds remaining. He then returned to Gran Peña, with whom he achieved promotion to the third division in 1972, mainly thanks to Waldo's 53 goals. In 1973, he was appointed to the helm of Compostela for the third time, but at the end of the season, he returned to Gran Peña, which he led for six years, from 1974 until 1980.

== Death ==
Sanz died on 8 May 1990, at the age of 75.

== Honours ==
Celta de Vigo

Copa del Rey:

- Runner-up (1): 1948
