= Guynes =

Guynes is a surname. Notable people with the surname include:

- Demi Moore, née Demi Guynes (born 1962), American actress and film producer
- Jasper Felix Guynes (1875-1961), American politician and judge
- Thomas Guynes (born 1974), American football player

== See also ==
- Guines (disambiguation)
