= Loreto Tuñón Ginés =

Spanish athlete

Personal information
- Born: 2007 (age 18–19) Valladolid, Spain
- Relative(s): José Ginés (grandfather); Diana Sanz Ginés (cousin); Erica Sanz Ginés (cousin)

Sport
- Sport: Trampolining

Loreto Tuñón Ginés (born 2007) is a Spanish athlete who competes in trampoline gymnastics.

== Sporting career ==
Loreto Tuñón Ginés trains with the Acrobática Valladolid club. Her coach is Teresa Ginés. She has competed along with her cousins Diana Sanz Ginés and Erica Sanz Ginés. In the 2025 Trampoline Gymnastics World Championships, she won a bronze medal alongside Melania Rodríguez and Marta López. She won a bronze medal at the 2026 Alkmaar World Cup.

== Awards ==
Trampoline Gymnastics World Championships
2025	Pamplona (Spain)	Bronze	Double mini team
