= Larrauri =

Larrauri is a quarter in Mungia (Basque Country) and a surname. Notable people with the surname include:

- José Larrauri (born 1940), Spanish footballer
- José María Larrauri Lafuente (1918–2008), Spanish Bishop of the Roman Catholic Church
- Juanita Larrauri (1910–1990), Argentine singer and politician
- Oscar Larrauri (born 1954), Argentine Formula One driver
- Pier Larrauri (born 1994), Peruvian footballer
