= Guines =

Guines may refer to:

- Güines, a city in Cuba
- Guînes, a commune in France

== See also ==
- Gines (disambiguation)
- Guinness (disambiguation)
- Güeñes, a municipality in Biscay, Spain
