= Aretio =

Aretio is a surname. Notable people with the surname include:

- Juan Rodríguez Aretio (1922–1973), Spanish footballer
- Pietro de Accolti de Aretio (1455–1532), Italian Roman Catholic cardinal and judge of the Roman Rota
