= Salvador López =

Salvador Lopez or López may refer to:

== Given name and surname ==
- Salvador P. Lopez (1911–1993), Filipino writer, diplomat and statesman
- Salvador López Chávez (1915–1976), Mexican industrialist, competed in the 1953 Carrera Panamericana
- Salvador López Gómez (1852–1936), Spanish gymnast, quarrelled with José Luis Gallegos
- Salvador López Guijarro (1834–1904), Spanish writer and diplomat, ambassador to Argentina
- Salvador López Orduña (born 1953), Mexican politician
- Salvador López Rochac (fl. 1930s), Salvadoran politician and military officer
- Salvador López Sanz (1924–2009), Spanish politician

== Surnames ==
- Luis Miguel Salvador López (born 1968), Mexican footballer
