= Francisco Simón =

Spanish footballer (1917–1978)

Personal information
- Full name: Francisco Simón Calvet
- Date of birth: 11 October 1917
- Place of birth: Barcelona, Catalonia, Spain
- Date of death: 7 February 1978 (aged 60)
- Place of death: As Pontes de García Rodríguez, Spain
- Height: 1.67 m (5 ft 6 in)
- Position: Goalkeeper

Youth career
- Deportivo de La Coruña

Senior career*
Years	Team	Apps	(Gls)
1941–1945	Deportivo de La Coruña	6	(0)
1945–1954	Celta	152	(0)
- * Club domestic league appearances and goals

Francisco Simón Calvet (11 October 1917 – 7 February 1978), was a Spanish footballer who played as a goalkeeper.

== Honors ==
- Copa del Rey runner-up: 1948
