= Félix Zubiaga =

Spanish footballer (1945–2016)

- Zubiaga with Athletic Bilbao

Personal information
- Full name: Mateo Félix Zubiaga Atxa
- Date of birth: 4 January 1945
- Place of birth: Arrankudiaga, Spain
- Date of death: 7 January 2016 (aged 71)
- Place of death: Bilbao, Spain
- Height: 1.68 m (5 ft 6 in)
- Position: Utility player

Senior career*
Years	Team	Apps	(Gls)
1965–1975	Athletic Bilbao	106	(18)
1965–1969	Bilbao Athletic	6+	(4+)
1975–1976	Calvo Sotelo	19	(1)
1976–1978	Arenas Getxo		
Total		131+	(23+)

Managerial career
- 1983–1985: Gimnàstic Tarragona
- 1986: Gimnàstic Tarragona
- 1988–1989: Lemona
- * Club domestic league appearances and goals

Mateo Félix Zubiaga Atxa (4 January 1945 – 7 January 2016) was a Spanish footballer and manager. A utility player, he often played as a left back or forward, but featured in all positions except central defence and goalkeeper. He spent most of his career at Athletic Bilbao, playing 132 games and scoring 22 goals across all competitions. He won the Copa del Generalísimo in 1973, scoring a goal in the final.

== Career ==
Born in Arrankudiaga in the Basque Country, Zubiaga came through the youth ranks at Athletic Bilbao, then known as Atlético de Bilbao. He made his debut in La Liga on 21 February 1965 in a goalless home draw with Deportivo de La Coruña and totalled four appearances for the campaign, scoring once on 18 April with the game's only goal against Córdoba at the San Mamés Stadium.

Zubiaga then dropped into the reserve team, Bilbao Athletic, and did not return to the first team until 1969–70, under manager Ronnie Allen. He was the team's top scorer that season with 11 goals from 23 games, including a hat-trick on 1 February 1970 in a 5–0 home win over Real Madrid; as of his death he was the last Athletic player to score three goals against that opponent. Zubiaga said that the English manager was the first to tell him that scoring three goals was a feat with a name and a ritual of taking home the signed match ball; he had no attachment to any memorabilia and gave the ball away. Zubiaga had been substituted with a dislocated elbow in the preceding match at Elche and had barely trained before the Real Madrid game.

Playing on the left wing under manager Milorad Pavić, Zubiaga scored the second goal of the Copa del Generalísimo final on 29 June 1973, which Athletic won 2–0 against Castellón. He had recently returned from tibia and fibula injuries before the game.

Zubiaga left the club from Bilbao in 1975 as his contract was renewed if he played 15 games in a season, and he fell short of the mark by five games. After one season in the Segunda División with Calvo Sotelo, he concluded his career back in his native region with Arenas Getxo.

As a manager, Zubiaga took over at Segunda División B club Gimnàstic de Tarragona in 1983. On 28 September, he defeated fellow Catalans Español in the first round of the Copa del Rey, 7–6 on a penalty shootout, and won the division's Copa de la Liga by the same method against CD Logroñés in June 1984. In February 1985, he was replaced by Ignacio Rojas, returning 13 months later for the remainder of a season that ended with relegation.

== Death ==
Zubiaga died on 7 January 2016, three days after turning 71. His funeral was held in Okondo in Álava.
