= Santiago Sanz =

Santiago Sanz may refer to:

- Santiago Sanz Fraile (1914-1980), known as Yayo, Spanish football midfielder turned manager
- Santiago Sanz Méndez (born 1962), known as Quecho, Spanish football midfielder
- Santiago Sanz (rugby union) (born 1979), Argentine rugby union player
- Santiago Sanz (parathlete) (born 1980), Spanish parathlete
