= José Fernando Rodilla =

Spanish footballer

Personal information
- Full name: José Fernando Martínez Rodilla
- Date of birth: 3 March 1950 (age 76)
- Place of birth: Vigo, Spain
- Height: 1.69 m (5 ft 7 in)
- Position: Forward

Youth career
- 1961–1966: Alerta Vigo
- 1966–1968: Celta

Senior career*
| Years | Team | Apps | (Gls) |
| 1968–1969 | Gran Peña | | |
| 1969–1976 | Celta | 96 | (5) |
| 1969–1970 | → Langreo (loan) | | |
| 1976–1977 | Valladolid | 12 | (0) |
| 1977 | Sabadell | 0 | (0) |
| 1977–1978 | Reus | | |
| 1978–1979 | Yeclano | | |
| Total | | 108 | (5) |

International career
| 1971 | Spain U23 | 2 | (0) |
| 1972 | Spain | 1 | (0) |
- * Club domestic league appearances and goals

José Fernando Martínez Rodilla (born 3 March 1950 in Vigo, Galicia) is a Spanish former footballer who played as a forward.
