= Félix Carnero =

Spanish footballer and manager

Personal information
- Full name: Félix Javier Carnero Correa
- Date of birth: 1 June 1948 (age 78)
- Place of birth: Vigo, Spain
- Height: 1.78 m (5 ft 10 in)
- Position: Midfielder

Youth career
- Apache
- Amanecer
- Celta

Senior career*
Years	Team	Apps	(Gls)
1966–1967	Rápido Bouzas		
1967–1968	Celta	3	(0)
1968–1974	Castellón	161	(14)
1974–1979	Celta	127	(20)
Total		291	(34)

Managerial career
- 1981–1983: Celta (assistant)
- 1983–1984: Gran Peña
- 1984–1985: Celta
- 1988–1989: Arosa
- 1989–1990: Lugo
- 1990–1994: Arosa
- * Club domestic league appearances and goals

Félix Javier Carnero Correa (born 1 June 1936) is a Spanish retired footballer who played as a midfielder, and is a former manager.

== Playing career ==
Born in Bouzas, Vigo, Pontevedra, Galicia, Carnero started his career with Rápido de Bouzas before returning to RC Celta de Vigo, a club he represented as a youth, in 1967. He made his professional debut on 3 March 1968, starting in a 1–2 Segunda División home loss against Real Valladolid.

In July 1968, after appearing rarely, Carnero moved to Tercera División side CD Castellón, where he helped the side to achieve promotion to the second division in his first season. He was subsequently a regular starter for the side, winning promotion to La Liga in 1972.

Carnero made his debut in the top tier on 3 September 1972, playing the full 90 minutes of a 2–3 home loss against Real Madrid. He scored his first goals in the category the following 4 March, as he scored a brace in a 5–1 home routing of former side Celta.

In 1974, after suffering relegation, Carnero returned to Celta, where he spent his subsequent five campaigns alternating between the first and second levels. In 1979, he retired at the age of 31.

== Post-playing career ==
Immediately after retiring Carnero joined Celta's backroom staff, becoming an assistant manager of Milorad Pavić in 1981. He started the 1983–84 campaign as a manager of Gran Peña FC (the farm team) in the fourth division before being appointed manager of the main squad in March 1984, in the place of sacked Carriega.

Carnero led the Celestes back to the first division in the 1984–85, but was sacked on 26 November 1985 after a poor start of the campaign. He later worked as a manager for Arosa SC, where he was in charge of the club for the largest number of matches (155), and CD Lugo in Segunda División B.

After ending his managerial career, Carnero worked as a technical secretary at his main club Celta, being released from the club in 2007 after also working as a sporting director. He subsequently joined Cádiz CF, but left in October after the club was close to changing their board.
