= Quecho =

Spanish footballer (born 1962)

Personal information
- Full name: Santiago Sanz Méndez
- Date of birth: 1 March 1962 (age 64)
- Place of birth: Vigo, Spain
- Height: 1.70 m (5 ft 7 in)
- Position: Midfielder

Youth career
- Celta de Vigo

Senior career*
Years	Team	Apps	(Gls)
1980–1981	Gran Peña		
1981–1984	Celta de Vigo		
1984–1986	Ourense		
1986–1988	Arenteiro		
1988–1996	Ourense		
- * Club domestic league appearances and goals

Santiago Sanz Méndez, also known as Quecho (born 1 March 1962), was a Spanish footballer who played as a midfielder for Celta de Vigo in the early 1980s.

== Career ==
Born on 1 March 1962 in Vigo, Pontevedra, Sanz began his football career in the youth academy of his hometown club Celta de Vigo, thus following the footsteps of his father of the same name, who had played for Celta in the 1940s. After playing in the youth team, he joined Gran Peña for the 1980–81 season.

Quecho made his official debut for Celta's first team on 31 May 1981, coming off the bench at half-time in the first leg of the final of the 1980–81 Segunda División B against Mallorca at the Condomina, helping his side to a 3–1 victory. He also played 15 minutes in the return leg at Balaidos, scoring his side's third goal in another 3–1 win. In his first full season at the club, Celta won the 1981–82 Segunda División, thus achieving promotion to La Liga. He made his top-flight debut on 5 September at the Ramón Sánchez Pizjuán in Seville. He went on to play 14 league matches that season, which ended in relegation to the second division, and a serious knee injury then prevented him from playing in the 1983–84 season, which was his last at Celta. In total, he only scored two goals for Celta, the other being on 13 December 1981 at Estadio de O Couto, where he would later play regularly with Ourense.

Quecho made his debut for Ourense on 14 October 1981, scoring a goal to help his side to a 3–1 victory over Coruxo. He scored six goals that season to help his side to a runner-up finish in the 1984–85 Tercera División, thus achieving promotion to Segunda División B. In the summer of 1986, he signed for Arenteiro, and in his first season at the club, he helped his side to a runner-up finish in the 1986–87 Tercera División, thus achieving promotion to Segunda División B. The following year, in 1988, he returned to Ourense, with whom he played for eight years, until 1996, playing a crucial role in the Ourense team that achieved promotion to the Second Division in 1994. Even though they were relegated back in 1995, Ourense achieved another promotion to the Second in 1996.

== Honours ==
Celta de Vigo

- Segunda División:
  - Champions (1): 1981–82
