= Juan Arza =

Spanish footballer and manager

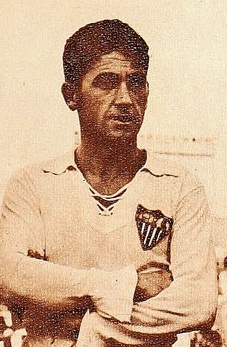
- Arza in 1952

Personal information
- Full name: Juan Arza Iñigo
- Date of birth: 12 June 1923
- Place of birth: Estella, Spain
- Date of death: 17 July 2011 (aged 88)
- Place of death: Seville, Spain
- Height: 1.69 m (5 ft 7 in)
- Position: Forward

Youth career
- Izarra

Senior career*
Years	Team	Apps	(Gls)
?–1942	Alavés		
1942–1943	Málaga		
1943–1959	Sevilla	349	(182)
1959–1960	Atlético Almería	19	(2)

International career
1954	Spain B	1	(0)
1947–1952	Spain	2	(0)

Managerial career
- 1960–1961: Bollullos
- 1962–1964: Andalusia (youth)
- 1964–1965: Linense
- 1966: Sevilla
- 1967: Sevilla
- 1968–1969: Sevilla
- 1970–1972: Celta
- 1972–1973: Sevilla
- 1973–1974: Celta
- 1975–1976: Cádiz
- 1977–1978: Deportivo La Coruña
- 1980: Celta
- * Club domestic league appearances and goals

Juan Arza Iñigo (12 June 1923 – 17 July 2011) was a Spanish football forward and manager.

He spent the majority of his career with Sevilla, appearing in 414 official games over the course of 16 La Liga seasons (206 goals, best-ever in the club's history), and also managed his main team on several occasions.

== Club career ==
Born in Estella-Lizarra, Navarre, Arza's first club was hometown's CD Izarra. He moved to neighbouring Deportivo Alavés in the Basque Country subsequently, then to CD Málaga, staying one year with the latter team.

In 1943, aged 20, Arza continued in Andalusia and joined Sevilla FC, where he had his most enduring and successful spell, scoring a hat-trick on his official debut, a 5–2 home win against CE Sabadell FC on 26 September, and netting 57 goals in his first four seasons combined – in 1946 the club won its first ever La Liga championship, with the player contributing with 14.

Dubbed El Niño de Oro ("The Golden Boy"), Arza scored a career-best 29 goals in the 1954–55 season, good enough for his first and only Pichichi Trophy. After only seven games in the 1959–60 campaign the 36-year-old left Sevilla to join Atlético Almería, and retired a year later.

Arza went on to coach his main team as an interim on several occasions, not being able to prevent top flight relegation in 1968 after 12 games in charge. He also worked with the club as match delegate in the 80s and 90s and, as a coach, was also at the helm of RC Celta de Vigo (five separate seasons, four in the top division).

== International career ==
Arza made two appearances for Spain in five years, in as many friendlies. His debut was on 2 March 1947 against the Republic of Ireland, in a 2–3 loss in Dublin.

== Death ==
Arza died in Seville on 17 July 2011, at the age of 88.

== Honours ==
=== Club ===
Sevilla

- La Liga: 1945–46
- Copa del Rey: 1948

=== Individual ===
- Pichichi Trophy: 1954–55
