= Juan Rodríguez Aretio =

Spanish footballer and manager

Personal information
- Full name: Juan Rodríguez Aretio
- Date of birth: 10 July 1922
- Place of birth: Ferrol, Spain
- Date of death: 24 September 1973 (aged 51)
- Place of death: A Coruña, Spain
- Height: 1.76 m (5 ft 9 in)
- Position: Midfielder

Youth career
- Racing de Ferrol
- Pontevedra CF
- Club Peñasco

Senior career*
Years	Team	Apps	(Gls)
1943–1949	Celta de Vigo		
1949–1950	FC Barcelona		
1950–1951	Real Murcia CF		
1951–1953	Sporting de Gijón		
1953–1954	Celta de Vigo		
1955–1956	Salgueiros		

Managerial career
- 1961–1962: Celta de Vigo
- 1963–1964: Recreativo de Huelva
- 1964–1966: Melilla CF
- 1966–1967: Real Oviedo
- 1972–1973: Celta de Vigo
- * Club domestic league appearances and goals

Juan Rodríguez Aretio (10 July 1922 – 24 September 1973) was a Spanish footballer who played as a midfielder for Spanish club Celta de Vigo, FC Barcelona, and Sporting de Gijón. He was also a manager, taking charge of Celta de Vigo and Recreativo de Huelva.

== Early life ==
Juan Rodríguez Aretio was born in Ferrol on 10 July 1922, and began playing football at his hometown club Racing de Ferrol, Pontevedra CF, and Club Peñasco.

== Club career ==
After standing out in regional football, Aretio arrived at Celta in the 1943–44 season along with Pahiño to sweeten the goodbye of two monsters: Nolete, who left football; and Juan del Pino, who signed for Sabadell. In their first year at the club, they formed a great attacking quintet made up of Roig, Miguel Muñoz, Pahiño, Aretio, and Vázquez, which played a crucial role in taking Vigo out of the Segunda División. In 1948, he was a member of the Vigo side that reached the final of the 1948 Spanish Cup, which still is the club's only Copa del Rey final appearance, but they lost 1–4 to Sevilla FC, courtesy of a hat-trick from Mariano Uceda. In the late 1940s, Aretio began to fall apart as the exodus of stars from Celta began: Pahiño and Muñoz signed for Real Madrid, and a year later they were joined by Gabriel Alonso and Sobrado, while Roig retired from football.

Aretio thus left Celta too in October 1949, and went to Barcelona, where he joined the ranks of FC Barcelona, who paid five hundred thousand pesetas for him. At Barcelona, he did not lose his goal-scoring instinct, scoring 7 goals in 19 competitive matches, always accompanied in this aspect by Pahiño. After playing for Barcelona, Murcia, and Sporting de Gijón, with whom he played twenty matches in 1951–52, and ten in 1952–53. Aretio then returned to Celta in November 1953, but he was no longer the player who had left, and was released at the end of that season. In total, he scored 63 goals in 148 matches for Celta. He ended his career at Salgueiros of the Portuguese Second Division in 1955–56, at the age of 34.

Aretio was known as a footballer with dribbling skills and had an aptitude for header shots.

== Managerial career ==
After his career as a player ended, Aretio remained linked to Celta, now as a coach, which he oversaw in two stages (1961–62 and 1972–73). The tremendous outcome of the latter season surpassed all the limits of the admiration that the Balaidos fans felt for Aretio. Although Celta had a foot and a half in the Second Division, the outcome was only decided on the last matchday against Real Madrid, then coached by Miguel Muñoz, and own goals from Touriño, Doblas and Jiménez, in a stadium where they say there was no room for even a pin, led Celta to salvation. Once the fight was over, Aretio burst into tears hugging his beloved enemy Muñoz.

This victory coincided with the 50th anniversary of the foundation of Celta Vigo, but Aretio was too sick to celebrate, since his perennial voice led him to an initial diagnosis of laryngeal cancer; later denied and displacing all fears to the lungs. He also coached Turista, Racing de Ferrol (1960–61), Recreativo de Huelva (1963–64), Melilla, Oviedo (1966–67) Avilés, and Gran Peña Celtista (1973).

== Death ==
Aretio died of lung cancer in A Coruña on 24 September 1973, at the age of, on the same day that two teams he had coached were going to face each other: Oviedo and Celta, and although Celta won 5–1, the bouquet of flowers that Oviedo had left on his grave before the game sowed desires for a draw within many Celta fans.

A month later a well-deserved tribute match was played to honor his memory, with all the clubs providing their best men for the game while the Hotel Nice offered free accommodation to all of them.

== Honours ==
Celta de Vigo

Copa del Rey:

- Runner-up (1): 1948
