= CF Reus Deportiu =

Spanish football team

Reus
- Full name: Club de Futbol; Reus Deportiu, S.A.D.
- Nicknames: Ganxets; La avellana mecánica (The clockwork hazelnut)
- Founded: 23 November 1909; 116 years ago (as Club Deportivo de Reus)
- Dissolved: 20 October 2020; 6 years ago
- Ground: Estadi Municipal, Reus, Catalonia, Spain
- Capacity: 4,700
- Owner(s): Clifton Onolfo via Global Cities SHH Capital, Ltd
- President: Clifton V Onolfo
- Website: http://www.cfreusdeportiu.com/

Club de Futbol Reus Deportiu, S.A.D. was a Spanish football team based in Reus, in the autonomous community of Catalonia. Founded in 1909, it last competed in the Segunda Division (while its B team competed in the Tercera Division) before folding during the 2018–19 Segunda División season. It held its home games at Estadi Municipal, with a capacity of 4,700 seats.

== History ==
CD Reus was founded on 23 November 1909 after the dissolution of Reus Sport Club. On 29 September 1917, the club merged with Club Velocipedista and SC Olímpia becoming the multi-sports club Reus Deportiu.

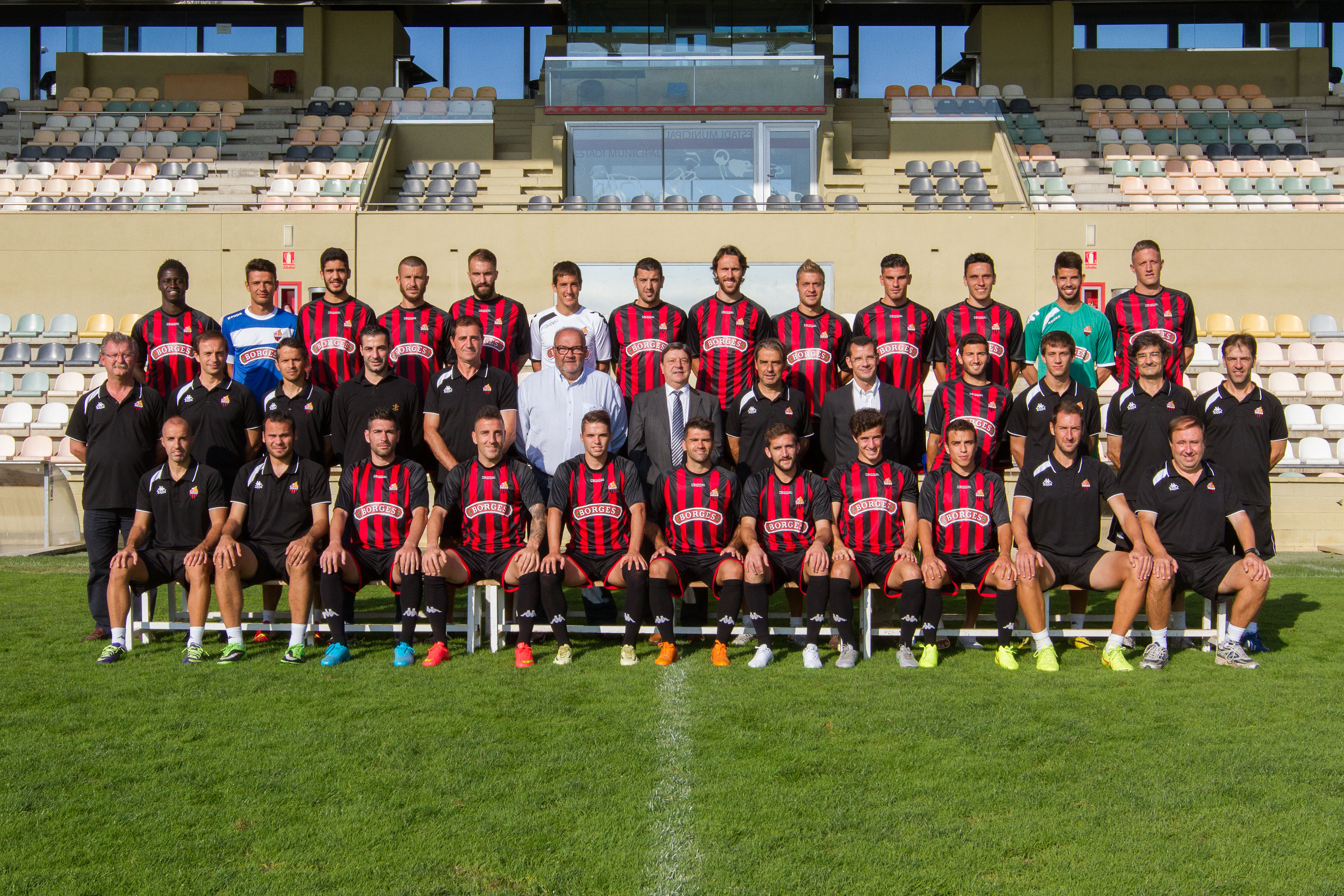
2015–16 squad, that achieved the promotion to Segunda División

In 1951, Reus Deportiu was restructured into two independent entities: CF Reus Deportiu, entirely dedicated to football, and Reus Deportiu, supporting the other sports, roller hockey being the most well known.

After several years playing in Segunda División B, Reus qualified in 2015 to the promotion play-offs for the first time in its history. It was defeated in the second round by Racing Ferrol.

In 2015, the club reached the round of 32 of the 2015–16 Copa del Rey, where it was defeated by Atlético Madrid. In that season, the club also qualified to the promotion play-offs, this time as champion of the Segunda División B Group 3. In the first leg, Reus beat Racing de Santander by 3–0 away, and achieved the first promotion ever to Segunda División after a 1–0 home win in the second leg, played on 29 May 2016.

On 18 January 2019, the Liga de Fútbol Profesional suspended the rights of Reus to continue competing in the competition and ten days later the club was expelled from the competition for three years plus a fine of €250,000 due to the nonpayment of players' salaries.

In July 2019, after the draw of the groups for the 2019–20 Segunda División B, Reus was excluded again due to the non-payment and relegated to Tercera División, from which the club was expelled in September for the non-payment of its debt with the RFEF and non-appearance in the first two matches. It was also ruled that the club could not play in the three Catalan regional leagues until its debts were settled. In October 2019, the Court of Arbitration for Sport ordered that Reus be reinstated to Segunda B but could not be implemented, and in July 2020, the club was kept out of league football yet again for non-payment of its reserve team players.

On 20 October 2020, Reus was liquidated by the court, after the club's owners failed to present a plan to pay off the debts, estimated in more than €9 million. In 2022, CF Reddis merged with the youth sides of Reus to create a unique football project for the city, and the new club was called Reus FC Reddis.

== Season to season ==
Logo of the club until the 2016–17 season

Season	Tier	Division	Place	Copa del Rey
1940–41	5	1ª Reg. B	2nd	
1941–42	3	1ª Reg.	5th	
1942–43	3	1ª Reg.	3rd	
1943–44	3	3ª	3rd	Second round
1944–45	3	3ª	6th	
1945–46	3	3ª	3rd	
1946–47	3	3ª	9th	
1947–48	3	3ª	12th	Fourth round
1948–49	4	1ª Reg.	15th	
1949–50	3	3ª	12th	
1950–51	3	3ª	17th	
1951–52	4	1ª Reg.	16th	
1952–53	4	1ª Reg.	1st	
1953–54	3	3ª	13th	
1954–55	3	3ª	6th	
1955–56	3	3ª	8th	
1956–57	3	3ª	5th	
1957–58	3	3ª	20th	
1958–59	4	1ª Reg.	2nd	
1959–60	4	1ª Reg.	1st	
1960–61	3	3ª	3rd	

Season	Tier	Division	Place	Copa del Rey
1961–62	3	3ª	4th	
1962–63	3	3ª	8th	
1963–64	3	3ª	11th	
1964–65	3	3ª	8th	
1965–66	3	3ª	18th	
1966–67	3	3ª	5th	
1967–68	3	3ª	11th	
1968–69	3	3ª	14th	
1969–70	3	3ª	18th	Second round
1970–71	4	Reg. Pref.	12th	
1971–72	4	Reg. Pref.	8th	
1972–73	4	Reg. Pref.	15th	
1973–74	4	Reg. Pref.	13th	
1974–75	4	Reg. Pref.	6th	
1975–76	4	Reg. Pref.	1st	
1976–77	3	3ª	19th	Second round
1977–78	4	3ª	6th	Second round
1978–79	4	3ª	3rd	First round
1979–80	4	3ª	2nd	First round
1980–81	4	3ª	1st	First round
1981–82	3	2ª B	14th	First round

Season	Tier	Division	Place	Copa del Rey
1982–83	3	2ª B	20th	
1983–84	4	3ª	15th	
1984–85	4	3ª	19th	
1985–86	5	Reg. Pref.	1st	
1986–87	4	3ª	19th	
1987–88	4	3ª	16th	
1988–89	4	3ª	6th	
1989–90	4	3ª	6th	
1990–91	4	3ª	19th	First round
1991–92	5	1ª Cat.	2nd	
1992–93	4	3ª	9th	
1993–94	4	3ª	13th	
1994–95	4	3ª	20th	
1995–96	5	1ª Cat.	11th	
1996–97	5	1ª Cat.	10th	
1997–98	5	1ª Cat.	2nd	
1998–99	4	3ª	12th	
1999–2000	4	3ª	14th	
2000–01	4	3ª	14th	
2001–02	4	3ª	3rd	

Season	Tier	Division	Place	Copa del Rey
2002–03	3	2ª B	18th	
2003–04	4	3ª	2nd	
2004–05	4	3ª	4th	
2005–06	3	2ª B	17th	
2006–07	4	3ª	1st	
2007–08	4	3ª	3rd	First round
2008–09	4	3ª	2nd	
2009–10	4	3ª	2nd	Second round
2010–11	4	3ª	4th	
2011–12	3	2ª B	8th	
2012–13	3	2ª B	14th	
2013–14	3	2ª B	12th	
2014–15	3	2ª B	3rd	
2015–16	3	2ª B	1st	Round of 32
2016–17	2	2ª	11th	Second round
2017–18	2	2ª	14th	Second round
2018–19	2	2ª	DQ	Third round
2019–20	4	3ª	DQ	
2020–21	DNP			

- 3 seasons in Segunda División
- 10 seasons in Segunda División B
- 48 seasons in Tercera División

== Retired numbers ==
7 – (Spain) Jordi Pitarque MF (2009–10) – posthumous honour

== Notable players ==
Players who appeared in more than 100 league matches for the club and/or reached international status.

- (Cameroon) David Eto'o
- (Equatorial Guinea) Aitor Embela
- (Guinea-Bissau) Eliseu Cassamá
- (Philippines) Juan Luis Guirado
- (Serbia) Dejan Lekić
- (Spain) Ángel Blasco
- (Spain) Édgar Badía
- (Spain) Fran Carbià
- (Spain) Álex Colorado
- (Spain) Ramón Folch
- (Spain) Édgar Hernández
- (Spain) José Juncosa
- (Spain) José Fernando Martínez Rodilla
- (Spain) Sergi Masqué
- (Spain) Jesús Olmo
- (Spain) David Querol
- (Spain) David Sangrà
- (Spain) Enric Socías
- (Spain) Aleix Vidal
- (United States) Shaq Moore
- (Venezuela) Mikel Villanueva

== Coaches ==
- (Spain) José Juncosa (1981–82)
- (Spain) Josep Seguer (1983)
- (Spain) José Juncosa (1985–87)
- (Spain) Miguel Ángel Rubio (2001–02)
- (Spain) Natxo González (2003–07)
- (Spain) Ramón Calderé (2007–09)
- (Spain) Santi Castillejo (2009–13)
- (Spain) Emili Vicente (2013–14)
- (Spain) Natxo González (2014–17)
- (Spain) Aritz López Garai (2017–2018)
- (Spain) Xavi Bartolo (2018–2019)

== See also ==
- CF Reus Deportiu B, reserve team.
