= Nolete =

Spanish footballer and politician

Personal information
- Full name: Manuel Copena Araújo
- Date of birth: 22 November 1911
- Place of birth: Gondomar, Pontevedra, Spain
- Date of death: 30 November 1987 (aged 76)
- Place of death: Spain
- Position: Forward

Senior career*
Years	Team	Apps	(Gls)
1930–1932	Eiriña		
1932–1936	Celta de Vigo		
1939–1943	Celta de Vigo		
1943–1944	Orensana		
Total		17	(37)

Managerial career
- 1943–1944: Orensana
- * Club domestic league appearances and goals

Manuel Copena Araújo, better known as Nolete (22 November 1911 – 30 November 1987), was a Spanish footballer who played as a forward for Celta de Vigo between 1932 and 1943. He was the club's best goalscorer of the 1930s, scoring 153 goals in 171 matches for Celta.

== Playing career ==
Born on 22 November 1911 in Gondomar, Pontevedra, Nolete began his football career at his hometown club Eiriña in 1930, aged 19, where he quickly stood for his goal-scoring ability so he was signed by Celta de Vigo in 1932. Four years later, he was the top scorer of the 1935–36 Segunda División with 19 goals in 13 league matches, thus contributing decisively to help the team win the title and achieve promotion to La Liga for the first time. However, they were unable to make their top-flight debut there because of the outbreak of the Spanish Civil War, in which he was sent as a soldier to the Aragon front.

Celta was finally able to make its top-flight debut on 3 December 1939, against Real Zaragoza at the Estadio Torrero, where Nolete scored a brace in an eventual 3–2 loss, thus going down in history as the author of the first-ever La Liga goal in the club's history. Throughout his career, he scored several crucial goals for Celta, such as the ones in the club's first promotion playoff in 1936, the goal against Zaragoza that saved Celta from relegation in 1941, and the winner against Real Madrid in the round of 16 of the 1941 Copa del Rey, where they reached the semifinals. He was noted for his strong head game, partly induced by his physique and great height of 1.85 meters, but he was good with his feet; for instance, he once scored against Sporting de Gijón from the halfway line.

By the time the Civil War ended in 1939, the club found itself in a dire financial situation, being on the verge of disappearing, so the players, including Nolete, refused to collect what the club owed them to avoid liquidation. Likewise, throughout his career, Nolete refused several lucrative offers from prominent clubs, such as Real Madrid, because, as he later recalled, "they could offer me all the gold in the world and I would never leave my homeland, my Celta". He remained loyal to Celta for over a decade, from 1932 until 1943, scoring a total of 153 goals in 171 official matches for Celta, (Note: There is disparity regarding his overall goalscoring tally for Celta, with some sources also stating that he scored 161 goals.) including 17 goals in 37 La Liga matches. He remains one of the club's all-time top scorers, only behind the likes of Vladimir Gudelj, Hermidita (113), and Iago Aspas (212). On 11 April 1943, he was the subject of a tribute match organized by Celta, against Deportivo at the Balaídos, where he received a standing ovation and banners with the slogans "Nolete, Nolete, Nolete!".

In 1943, Nolete joined Orensana, where he worked as a player-coach in the 1943–44 season, at the end of which he retired from football, aged 33. He later managed Sporting Guardés in the 1970s.

== Later life ==
After retiring from football, Nolete taught in his hometown of Gondomar and later at the Santa Irene Institute in Vigo. He was also a member of the FET y de las JONS since 1939, being appointed mayor of Baiona in 1965, a position he held for eight years, until 1973.

== Death ==
Nolete died in Vigo on 30 November 1987, at the age of 76. There is a shirt named after him.

== Honours ==
Celta Vigo

- Segunda División:
  - Champions (1): 1935–36
