= Guinness (disambiguation) =

Guinness is a brand of beer.

Guinness may also refer to:

== Businesses ==
- Guinness Brewery, Dublin, Ireland
- Guinness Mahon, a merchant bank
- Guinness Peat Aviation, an aircraft leasing company
- Guinness Peat Group, an investment holding company

== People ==
- Guinness (surname)
- Guinness family, descendants of Arthur Guinness and his brother Samuel Guinness

== Sports ==
- Guinness GAA, a former Gaelic Athletic Association club
- Guinness Premiership, a rugby union competition, sponsored by Guinness between 2005 and 2010

== Other uses ==
- Guinness World Records, a reference book
- Guinness baronets, titles
- The Guinness Partnership, a housing association and charity

== See also ==
- Guinness-on-Sea
