= Victor Sanz =

- Born: October 13, 1973 (age 52)
- Origin: Wasco, California, United States
- Genres: Country
- Occupation: Singer
- Instrument: Vocals
- Years active: 2000-present
- Labels: Gramac, West Coast Independent

Victor Sanz (born October 13, 1973) is an American country music artist. He has released two studio albums, both on independent labels: Destination Unknown in 2000 on Gramac, and Hey Country in 2005 on his own West Coast Independent Records. These albums have produced three chart singles on the Billboard country charts. His highest-peaking single, "Tell Me What You Wanna Do", reached No. 60 in 2004.

== Biography ==
Sanz was born on October 13, 1973, in Wasco, California, to parents who had immigrated from Mexico.

Sanz later founded a band called Prairie Thunder, which opened for Merle Haggard, Collin Raye and Lee Roy Parnell. He then recorded another demo tape, which he gave to a friend. The friend then gave it to his father, Rusty Graham, who was the president of an independent record label called Gramac. Sanz then signed to Gramac, releasing his debut album Destination Unknown that year. This album produced two chart singles in "I'm Gonna Be There" and the title track, both of which peaked at No. 68 on the Billboard country charts. The title track was also made into a music video which aired on CMT. Also included on this album was a cover of Paul Davis's pop hit "I Go Crazy", which Sanz recorded in both English and Spanish.

Four years after the release of his debut album, Sanz and businessman Scott Hacker founded a label called West Coast Independent Records. His second album, 2004's Hey Country, was released on this label. This album produced two more singles in "Tell Me What You Wanna Do" and "Love Won't Let Me", the latter of which did not chart. Billboard identified Sanz as one of several Hispanic artists which major labels tried to break as star artists in the early 2000s, without much success.

== Discography ==
=== Albums ===
Title	Album details
Destination Unknown	Release date: March 14, 2000; Label: Gramac
Hey Country	Release date: April 5, 2005; Label: West Coast Independent

=== Singles ===
Year	Single	Peak positions	Album
Year	Single	US Country	Album
2000	"I'm Gonna Be There"	68	Destination Unknown
2000	"Destination Unknown"	68	Destination Unknown
2004	"Tell Me What You Wanna Do"	60	Hey Country
2005	"Love Won't Let Me"	—	Hey Country
"—" denotes releases that did not chart

=== Music videos ===
Year	Video
2005	"Love Won't Let Me"
