= Luis Pasarín =

Spanish footballer and manager

Personal information
- Full name: Luis Casas Pasarín
- Date of birth: 16 April 1902
- Place of birth: Pontevedra, Spain
- Date of death: 17 August 1986 (aged 84)
- Place of death: Madrid, Spain
- Height: 1.74 m (5 ft 9 in)
- Position: Defender

Youth career
- 1918–1921: Atlético Pontevedra

Senior career*
Years	Team	Apps	(Gls)
1921–1923	Fortuna Vigo		
1923–1929	Celta		
1929–1935	Valencia	65	(1)

International career
1924–1926	Spain	6	(0)

Managerial career
- 1946: Spain
- 1946–1948: Valencia
- 1948–1951: Celta
- 1951–1952: Porto
- 1953–1955: Málaga
- 1955–1956: Oviedo
- 1957: Granada
- 1957–1959: Celta
- 1959: Oviedo
- 1961–1963: Plus Ultra
- * Club domestic league appearances and goals

Luis Casas Pasarín (16 April 1902 – 17 August 1986) was a Spanish football defender and manager.

== Playing career ==
Born in Pontevedra, Galicia, Pasarín started his professional career with RC Celta de Vigo. One of the club's first captains, he appeared in its first ever official tournament, the 1923 Galician Championship, which ended in conquest.

Pasarín then spent six seasons with Valencia CF, created precisely after he left Celta. His best La Liga input occurred in 1932–33 as he played 17 games, but they could only rank ninth out of ten teams, narrowly avoiding relegation. After retiring in 1935 he worked in the Ministry of Labour, but returned shortly after to play for amateurs Nacional de Madrid.

Pasarín earned six caps for Spain, and represented the nation at the 1924 Summer Olympics.

== Coaching career ==
After the Spanish Civil War, Pasarín obtained his coaching licence. He was in charge of the national side for one game, then returned to Valencia for the 1946–47 season, leading the club to its third national championship in six years. He achieved a runner-up position the following year, trailing champions FC Barcelona by three points.

Pasarín also managed Celta in five top-flight campaigns in two separate spells, and also worked in that capacity with Real Oviedo and FC Porto (Portugal). He died on 17 August 1986 at the age of 84, in Madrid.
