= San Ginés =

San Ginés, the Spanish form of the name of St. Genesius of Arles, can refer to:

- San Ginés, Madrid, church in Madrid
- San Ginés, Arrecife, church in Arrecife, Lanzarote
- San Ginés, Guadalajara, church in Guadalajara, Spain
- Chocolatería San Ginés, a chain of cafés based in Madrid
