= Milorad Pavić (footballer) =

Serbian footballer and manager

Miša Pavić
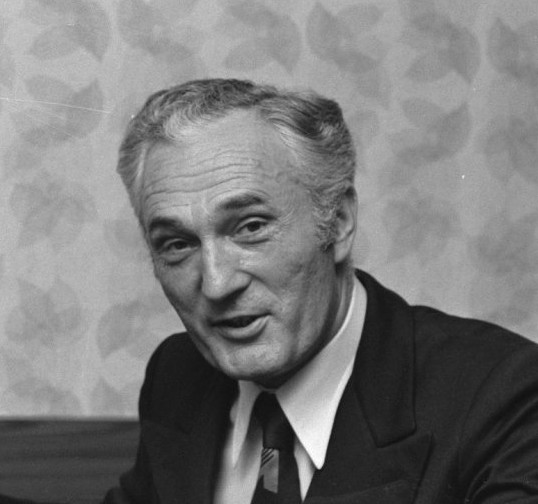
- Pavić in 1975 as Benfica coach

Personal information
- Date of birth: 11 November 1921
- Place of birth: Valjevo, Kingdom of Serbs, Croats and Slovenes
- Date of death: 16 August 2005 (aged 83)
- Place of death: Valjevo, Serbia and Montenegro

Senior career*
Years	Team	Apps	(Gls)
- Valjevo SK
- Red Star Belgrade

Managerial career
- 1957–1964: Red Star Belgrade
- 1964–1967: Standard Liège
- 1968–1969: Club Brugge
- 1969–1971: RFC Liège
- 1972–1974: Athletic Bilbao
- 1974–1975: Benfica
- 1975–1977: CD Málaga
- 1977–1978: Rouen
- 1978–1979: Sporting CP
- 1979: Vojvodina
- 1980–1983: Celta Vigo
- 1983–1984: Espanyol
- 1985–1987: Standard Liège
- 1987–1988: Standard Liège
- * Club domestic league appearances and goals

Milorad Pavić (Serbian Cyrillic: Милорад Павић, pronounced [mîlorad pǎːʋitɕ]; also known as Michel Pavić or Miša Pavić 11 November 1921 – 16 August 2005) was a Serbian football player and coach.

== Career ==
As a player, Pavić defended the colours of Red Star Belgrade. After his active career he became a head coach with the same team, winning the national championship three times (1958–59, 1959–60, 1963–64) and winning three Yugoslav Cups (1958, 1959, 1964). For seven seasons between 1957 and 1964, he led the team from the bench in 216 official competitive matches (113 wins, 52 draws, and 51 losses).

He also coached Belgian teams Club Brugge (1967–1969), Standard Liège (1964–1967, 1985–1986, 1987–1988), Portuguese teams Benfica (1974–1975) and Sporting CP (1978–1979), and Spanish teams Athletic Bilbao (1972–1974), CD Málaga (1975–1977) and Celta de Vigo (1980–1983). Outside Yugoslavia he was known by nickname "Michel". The press also described him as a Gentleman in Iron Gloves.

In his youth Pavić was taken hostage by the Germans in World War II.

Pavić also won two Belgian Cups as a coach with Standard Liege (1966, 1967), a Spanish Copa del Rey with Athletic Bilbao (1973), and a Portuguese league with Benfica in 1974–75.

== Honours ==
=== Manager ===
Red Star Belgrade

- Yugoslav First League: 1958–59, 1959–60, 1963–64
- Yugoslav Cup: 1957–58, 1958–59, 1963–64

Standard Liège

- Belgian Cup: 1965–66, 1966–67

Athletic Bilbao

- Copa del Generalísimo: 1972–73

Benfica

- Portuguese Championship: 1974–75

Celta Vigo

- Segunda División: 1981–82
