= José Larrauri =

Spanish footballer

Personal information
- Full name: José Ramón Martínez Larrauri
- Date of birth: 12 January 1940 (age 86)
- Place of birth: Bilbao, Spain
- Height: 1.77 m (5 ft 10 in)
- Position: Defender

Senior career*
Years	Team	Apps	(Gls)
1960–1965	Indautxu	101	(2)
1965–1974	Athletic Bilbao	200	(0)
Total		301	(2)
- * Club domestic league appearances and goals

José Ramón Martínez Larrauri (born 12 January 1940) is a Spanish retired footballer who played as a defender.

== Club career ==
Born in Bilbao, Biscay, Larrauri only played for two clubs in his 14-year senior career. He started out at SD Indautxu, in the Segunda División.

Larrauri was bought by Athletic Bilbao in summer 1965. He made his debut in La Liga on 19 September, in a 1–0 home win against Valencia CF; he appeared in 277 games over a nine-year spell at the San Mamés Stadium, including 24 in European competition.

== Honours ==
- Copa del Generalísimo: 1969, 1972–73
