= RC Celta de Vigo =

Association football club in Spain

Celta Vigo
- Full name: Real Club Celta de Vigo, S.A.D.
- Nicknames: Os Celestes (The Sky Blues); O Celtiña
- Short name: Celta
- Founded: 23 August 1923; 103 years ago (as Club Celta)
- Stadium: Balaídos
- Capacity: 24,870
- Coordinates: 42°12′42.6″N 8°44′22.9″W
- President: Marián Mouriño
- Head coach: Claudio Giráldez
- League: La Liga
- 2025–26: La Liga, 6th of 20
- Website: rccelta.es
Home colours	Away colours	Third colours

Real Club Celta de Vigo (Galician pronunciation: [reˈal ˈkluβ ˈθeltɐ ðɪ ˈβiɣʊ]; lit. 'Royal Celtic Club of Vigo'), commonly known as Celta Vigo or just Celta, is a Spanish professional football club based in Vigo, Galicia, that competes in La Liga, the top tier of Spanish football. Nicknamed Os Celestes (The Sky Blues), the club was founded in August 1923 as Club Celta, following the merger of Real Vigo Sporting and Real Fortuna. The club's home stadium is Balaídos, which seats 24,870 spectators.

The club's name is derived from the Celtic peoples who once lived in Galicia. Celta have a long-standing rivalry with fellow Galician club Deportivo A Coruña, with whom they contest the Galician derby.

Celta have never won the league title nor Copa del Rey, although they have reached the final three times in the latter. The club finished in their best-ever position of fourth in 2002–03, qualifying for the 2003–04 UEFA Champions League, where they were eliminated by Arsenal in the round of 16. In the 2016–17 UEFA Europa League, Celta reached the semi-finals for the first time, losing to Manchester United. In 2000, Celta were one of the co-winners of the UEFA Intertoto Cup.

== History ==
=== Foundation ===
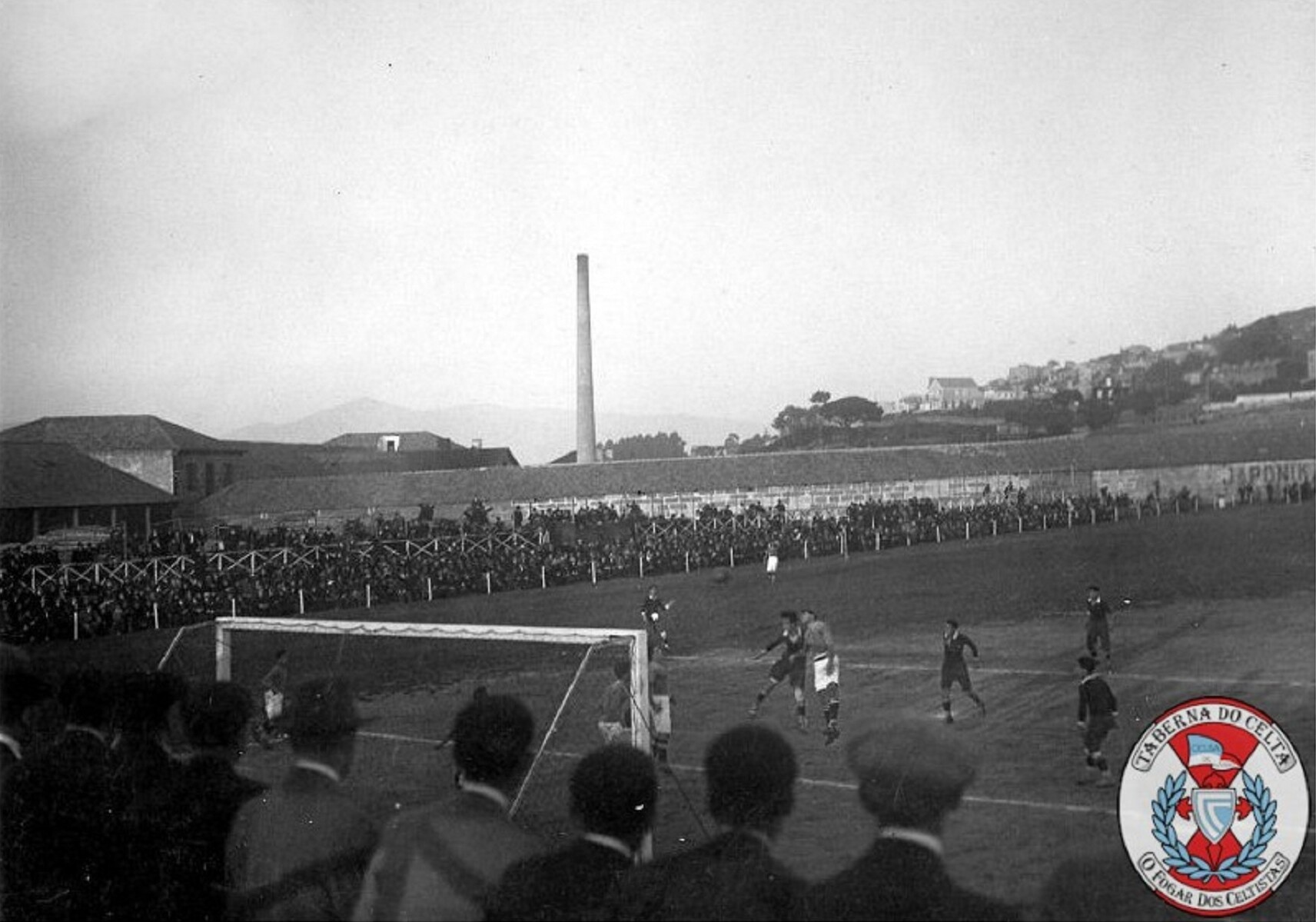
Campo de Coia (1908–1928)

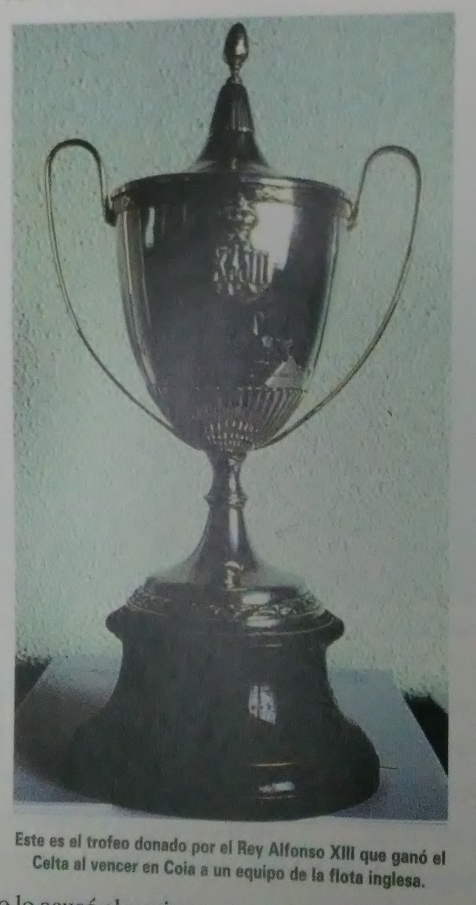
Copa del Rey Alfonso XIII' trophy in 1927

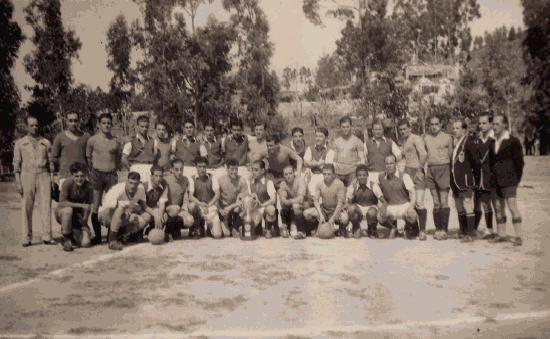
Real Club Celta de Vigo vs S.C. Braga in 1945

RC Celta de Vigo was formed as a result of the ambition of Vigo's teams to achieve more at national level, where the Basque sides had been their bête noire in the Spanish Championship. The idea was to merge both Vigo-based teams, Real Vigo Sporting and Real Club Fortuna de Vigo, to create a more powerful team at national level. The standard-bearer of this movement was Manuel de Castro, known as "Handicap", a sports writer for the Faro de Vigo who, from 1915, began to write in his articles about the need for a unitarian movement. The slogan of his movement was "Todo por y para Vigo" ("All by and for Vigo"), which eventually found support among the managers of both clubs. It was backed unanimously when De Castro himself presented the motion at the assembly of the Royal Spanish Football Federation in Madrid on 22 June 1923.

On 12 July 1923, the merger was approved at the annual general meetings of Vigo and Fortuna, held at the Cine Odeón and Hotel Moderno, respectively. At the last general meeting of Fortuna and Vigo, which approved the formation of the new club and was held on 10 August, the members decided on the name and colours of the team. Among the various names proposed were Club Galicia, Real Atlético FC, Real Club Olímpico, Breogán and Real Club Celta. The latter two names were the most liked and in the end they decided on Club Celta, an ethnic race linked to Galicia. The first president of Celta was Manuel Bárcena de Andrés, the Count of Torre Cedeira. This assembly also decided on the squad, which totaled 64 players and included some important players from Fortuna and Vigo, and was managed by Francis Cuggy. Their first match was a friendly against Portuguese side Boavista, which Celta won 8–2.

In January 1927, Celta won the 'Copa del Rey Alfonso XIII' trophy after defeating the English sailors team 4–1.

In 1947–48, Celta ranked fourth, the club's joint highest ever finish, and reached the Copa del Generalísimo final, where they lost 4–1 to Sevilla FC. Local striker Pahiño, who took the Pichichi Trophy for 21 goals in 22 games that season, subsequently moved to Real Madrid.

=== EuroCelta and subsequent decline ===
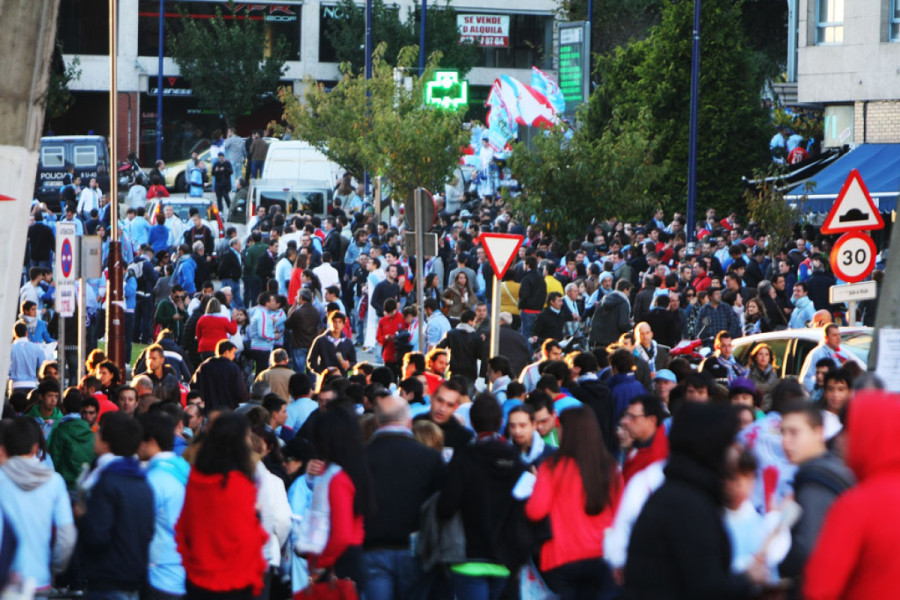
Celta supporters before a match

In the late 1990s and early 2000s, Celta were dubbed "EuroCelta" by the Spanish press as a result of their European performance. This included a 4–1 aggregate win against Liverpool in a run to the quarter-finals of the 1998–99 UEFA Cup. In the next season's edition they again reached the last eight, with a 4–0 second leg win over Juventus and a 7–0 home win against Benfica (8–1 on aggregate). Domestically, the team reached the 2001 Copa del Rey final, losing 3–1 to Real Zaragoza in Seville.

Key players during the period included Alexander Mostovoi, Valery Karpin and Haim Revivo, though the squad also relied upon other international players as well, such as goalkeeper Pablo Cavallero; defender and future coach Eduardo Berizzo, midfielders Claude Makélélé and Mazinho; winger Gustavo López; and strikers Catanha and Lyuboslav Penev, amongst others.

In 2002–03, under manager Miguel Ángel Lotina, Celta ranked fourth, their highest finish since 1948, and qualified for the 2003–04 UEFA Champions League. They reached the round of 16, where they were eliminated by Arsenal 5–2 on aggregate. Domestically that year, the team came 19th and suffered relegation to the Segunda División. Although the squad was heavily dismantled following the demotion, Celta earned an immediate return to the top flight after finishing second in 2004–05.

In 2006–07, Celta finished 18th and were once again relegated to the Segunda División. The team subsequently fought against relegation to the third tier, and the risk of bankruptcy. This trend was bucked in the 2010–11 season, when new striker David Rodríguez, winger Enrique de Lucas and manager Paco Herrera helped them finish sixth. They were eliminated in the first knockout round by Granada after a penalty shoot-out, the game having finished 1–1 in 90 minutes.

=== Return to La Liga and Europe ===
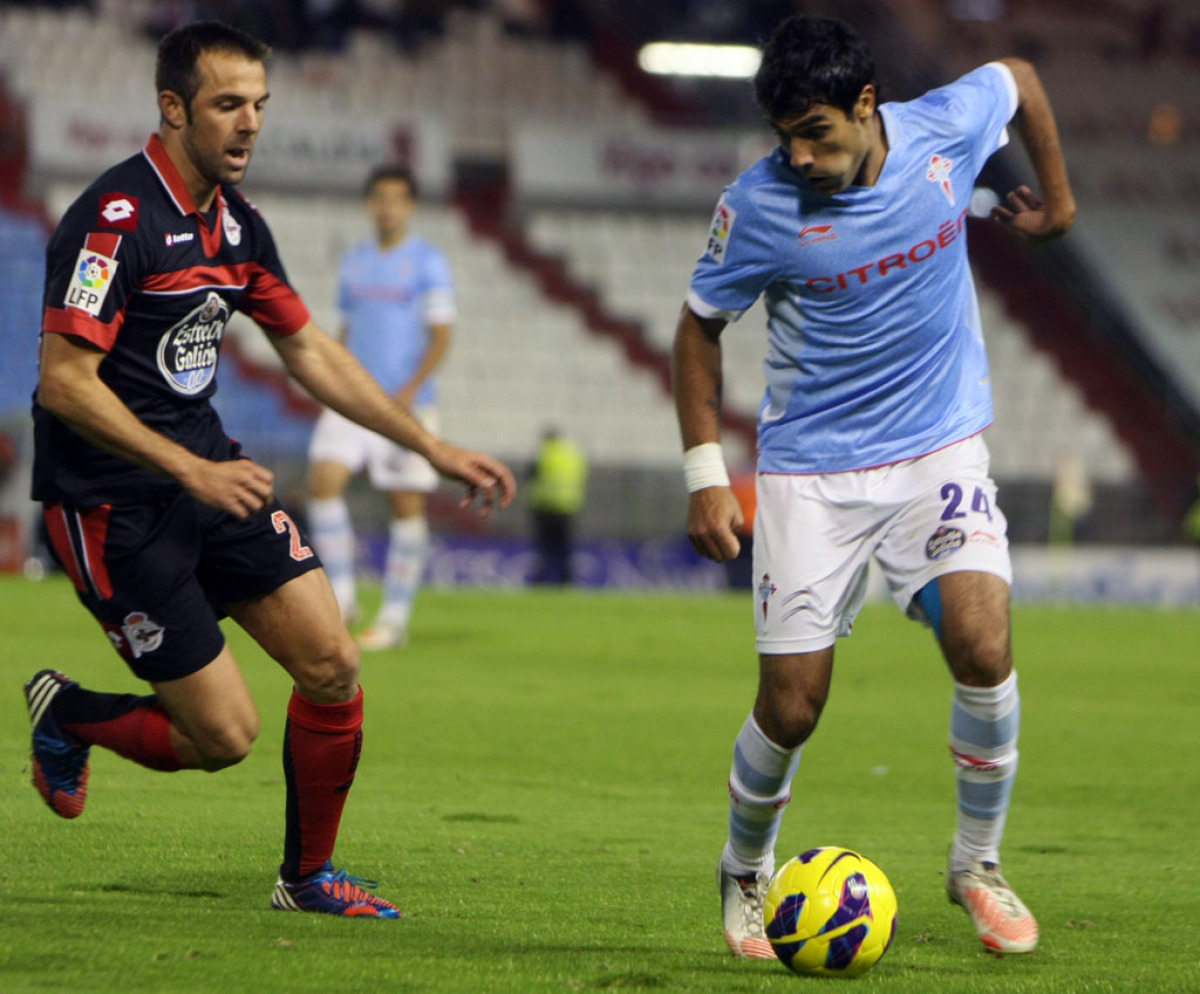
Celta playing regional rivals Deportivo de La Coruña in 2012

On 3 June 2012, Celta returned to La Liga after a five-year absence. In their first season after returning to the top flight, they avoided relegation to the Segunda División on the final day after beating RCD Espanyol 1–0 to ensure a 17th-place finish.

Under "EuroCelta" veteran Eduardo Berizzo in 2015–16, Celta finished sixth for their best result in a decade and earned a spot in the 2016–17 UEFA Europa League. In their return to European competitions, Celta reached the semi-finals of the 2016–17 UEFA Europa League, where they were eliminated by eventual champions Manchester United.

Celta avoided relegation on the final day of the season in 2019 and 2020, with the goals of local forward Iago Aspas being crucial in both seasons. In late 2023, shortly after the club's centenary, Carlos Mouriño resigned the presidency that he had held since 2006, ceding it to his daughter Marián as the first woman in the office. In 2024–25, Celta finished seventh and qualified for the Europa League for the first time in nine years.

== Identity ==
=== Crest ===
Celta's original crest was rather simple, featuring a red shield with two stylised letter Cs (Club Celta) and the royal crown of Spain; in the year of its foundation, the club became one of a number of Spanish football clubs to be granted patronage by Alfonso XIII and thus the right to use the honorific real (Royal) in its name and the crown on its badge. The following year the shield's colour was changed to the traditional sky blue colour. Like many other Galician clubs, such as Compostela and Racing Ferrol, the crest also features the red cross of Saint James which was added in 1928. During the Spanish Second Republic (1931–1936), the honorific title and crown were removed from the club's name and crest; however, it was to return under the Spanish State.

=== Kit ===
Celta's home colours are sky blue and white. Originally, their home strip consisted of a red shirt, black shorts and blue socks. This was later changed at an unknown date to the current colours, representative of the Galician flag.

1923–1924	Current

Celta had the longest-running sponsorship deal in Spanish football, and one of the longest-running in the world, with the French automobile manufacturer Citroën from 1985 to 2016. The company established its plant within walking distance from Balaídos in 1958, and had first sponsored the club's women's basketball team in 1980. In 2016, the sponsor was changed to that of Galician brewery, Estrella Galicia, which had advertised on the back of the shirts since 2011. Their business deal with kit supplier, Umbro, was also one of the longest-running ones, from 1986 to 2010.

Years	Kit manufacturer	Sponsor	
Years	Kit manufacturer	Brand	Company
1980–1982	Meyba	None	
1982–1986	Adidas	None	
1986–2010	Umbro	Citroën	Citroën Automóviles España, S.A.
2010–2013	Li-Ning	Citroën	Citroën Automóviles España, S.A.
2013–2016	Adidas	Citroën	Citroën Automóviles España, S.A.
2016–2024	Adidas	Estrella Galicia 0,0	Hijos de Rivera, S.A.U
2024–present	Hummel	Estrella Galicia 0,0	Hijos de Rivera, S.A.U

== Players ==
=== First-team squad ===
As of 1 September 2026

Note: Flags indicate national team as defined under FIFA eligibility rules; some limited exceptions apply. Players may hold more than one non-FIFA nationality.

No.	Pos.	Nation	Player
1	GK	TUR	Altay Bayındır (on loan from Manchester United)
2	DF	SWE	Carl Starfelt
3	DF	ESP	Marcos Alonso
4	DF	SEN	Abdoulaye Faye (on loan from Bayer Leverkusen)
5	DF	ESP	Sergio Carreira
6	MF	GUI	Ilaix Moriba
7	FW	ESP	Borja Iglesias
8	MF	ESP	Miguel Román
9	FW	ESP	Ferran Jutglà
10	FW	ESP	Iago Aspas (captain)
11	FW	ESP	Pablo Durán
13	GK	ROU	Ionuț Radu
14	MF	ESP	Aleix Febas

No.	Pos.	Nation	Player
15	DF	ESP	Álvaro Núñez
16	FW	ESP	Hugo González
17	DF	ESP	Javi Rueda
18	DF	ESP	Yoel Lago
19	FW	SWE	Williot Swedberg
20	DF	ESP	Javi Rodríguez
21	DF	URU	Sebastián Cáceres
22	DF	ESP	Javi Galán
23	FW	ESP	Hugo Álvarez
24	FW	MAR	Couhaib Driouech
25	GK	ESP	Iván Villar
39	FW	MAR	Jones El-Abdellaoui

=== Reserve team ===
Note: Flags indicate national team as defined under FIFA eligibility rules; some limited exceptions apply. Players may hold more than one non-FIFA nationality.

No.	Pos.	Nation	Player
26	GK	ESP	Coke Carrillo
27	DF	ESP	Quique Ribes
28	MF	ESP	Andrés Antañón
30	MF	ESP	Hugo Burcio

No.	Pos.	Nation	Player
31	FW	ESP	Ángel Arcos
35	DF	CMR	Germain Milla
38	FW	POR	Vlad (on loan from Paços de Ferreira)
40	GK	ESP	Marcos González

=== Out on loan ===
Note: Flags indicate national team as defined under FIFA eligibility rules; some limited exceptions apply. Players may hold more than one non-FIFA nationality.

No.	Pos.	Nation	Player
—	DF	ESP	Carlos Domínguez (at Oviedo until 30 June 2027)
—	DF	ESP	Unai Núñez (at Espanyol until 30 June 2027)
—	DF	ESP	Manu Sánchez (at Levante until 30 June 2027)

No.	Pos.	Nation	Player
—	MF	ESP	Carlos Dotor (at Málaga until 30 June 2027)
—	MF	ESP	Damián Rodríguez (at Cádiz until 30 June 2027)
—	MF	ESP	Hugo Sotelo (at Levante until 30 June 2027)

== Records ==
=== Club ===
As of 21 November 2026

- Most league appearances: 517, Iago Aspas (2008–2013, 2015–present)
- Most league goals: 203, Iago Aspas (2008–2013, 2015–present)
- Most La Liga goals: 169, Iago Aspas (2012–2013, 2015–present)
- Most goals in a season (top division): 69 (1998–99)
- Biggest win in top division: 10–1 (against Gimnàstic, 23 October 1949)
- Biggest away win in top division: 6–1, achieved on two occasions:
  - Against Las Palmas, 6 October 1957
  - Against Athletic Bilbao, 24 March 2002
- Biggest defeat in top division: 0–10 (against Athletic Bilbao, 11 January 1942)
- Most home points in a season (top division): 46 (1997–98)
- Most away points in a season (top division): 31 (2025–26)

=== Individual ===
As of 21 November 2026. All current players are in bold.

Most appearances

Rank	Player	Matches	Years
1	(Spain) **Iago Aspas**	587	2008–2013, 2015–present
2	(Spain) Manolo	533	1966–1982
3	(Spain) Hugo Mallo	449	2009–2023
4	(Spain) Atilano	392	1982–1994
5	(Spain) Javier Maté	369	1981–1993
6	(Spain) Vicente Álvarez	351	1979–1996
7	(Spain) Juan Fernández	349	1969–1980
8	(Spain) Santiago Castro	328	1970–1980
9	(Argentina) Gustavo López	295	1999–2007
10	(Russia) Aleksandr Mostovoi	290	1996–2004

Most goals scored

Rank	Player	Goals	Years
1	(Spain) **Iago Aspas**	223	2008–2013, 2015–present
2	(Spain) Hermidita	113	1945–1956
2	(Bosnia and Herzegovina) Vladimir Gudelj	113	1991–1999
4	(Spain) Nolete	101	1932–1943
5	(Spain) Pichi Lucas	93	1981–1990
6	(Spain) Abel Fernández	92	1965–1970
7	(Spain) Pahiño	91	1943–1948
8	(Spain) Ramón Polo	76	1923–1935
9	(Spain) Francisco Roig	75	1940–1949
10	(Spain) Mauro	72	1953–1958
10	(Russia) Aleksandr Mostovoi	72	1996–2004

== Internationals playing at Celta ==
The following past and present Celta players have been capped at full international level while playing for the club.

- (Algeria) Kamel Ghilas
- (Argentina) Pablo Cavallero
- (Argentina) Augusto Fernández
- (Argentina) Gustavo López
- (Argentina) Facundo Roncaglia
- (Argentina) Nelson Vivas
- (Bolivia) Juan Manuel Peña
- (Brazil) Vágner
- (Bulgaria) Petar Zanev
- (Chile) Pablo Contreras
- (Chile) Marcelo Díaz
- (Chile) Pablo Hernández
- (Chile) Fabián Orellana
- (Chile) Mauricio Pinilla
- (Colombia) Jeison Murillo
- (Croatia) Stjepan Andrijašević
- (Cyprus) Ioannis Okkas
- (Denmark) Michael Krohn-Dehli
- (Denmark) Pione Sisto
- (Denmark) Daniel Wass
- (Ecuador) Iván Kaviedes
- (Egypt) Mido
- (Gabon) Lévy Madinda
- (Ghana) Joseph Aidoo
- (Ghana) Quincy Owusu-Abeyie
- (Greece) Anastasios Douvikas
- (Greece) Zisis Vryzas
- (Guadeloupe) Claudio Beauvue
- (Guinea) Ilaix Moriba
- (Honduras) Gilberto Yearwood
- (Israel) Haim Revivo
- (Ivory Coast) Jonathan Bamba
- (Latvia) Māris Verpakovskis
- (Mexico) Néstor Araujo
- (Mexico) Orbelín Pineda
- (Morocco) Sofiane Boufal
- (Norway) Dan Eggen
- (Norway) Jørgen Strand Larsen
- (Paraguay) Júnior Alonso
- (Peru) Juan Jayo
- (Peru) Renato Tapia
- (Portugal) Jorge Cadete
- (Romania) Gabriel Tamaș
- (Russia) Valery Karpin
- (Russia) Aleksandr Mostovoi
- (Serbia) Nemanja Radoja
- (Serbia and Montenegro) Saša Ilić
- (Serbia and Montenegro) Savo Milošević
- (Slovakia) Stanislav Lobotka
- (Slovakia) Róbert Mazáň
- (South Africa) Benni McCarthy
- (South Korea) Park Chu-young
- (Spain) Gabriel Alonso
- (Spain) Iago Aspas
- (Spain) Fran Beltrán
- (Spain) Santiago Cañizares
- (Spain) Catanha
- (Spain) Quique Costas
- (Spain) Borja Iglesias
- (Spain) Juanfran
- (Spain) Ángel López
- (Spain) Sebastián Losada
- (Spain) Brais Méndez
- (Spain) Óscar Mingueza
- (Spain) Miguel Muñoz
- (Spain) Nolito
- (Spain) Jorge Otero
- (Spain) Borja Oubiña
- (Spain) Pahiño
- (Spain) Luis Pasarín
- (Spain) Ramón Polo
- (Spain) José Fernando Rodilla
- (Spain) Míchel Salgado
- (Spain) Juan Sánchez
- (Spain) José Vega
- (Spain) Juan Velasco
- (Sweden) John Guidetti
- (Sweden) Carl Starfelt
- (Sweden) Williot Swedberg
- (Turkey) Emre Mor
- (Turkey) Okay Yokuşlu
- (United States) Luca de la Torre
- (Uruguay) Fabián Canobbio
- (Uruguay) Pablo García
- (Uruguay) Maxi Gómez
- (Venezuela) Andrés Túñez
- (Federal Republic of Yugoslavia) Goran Đorović

== Management ==
=== Ownership ===
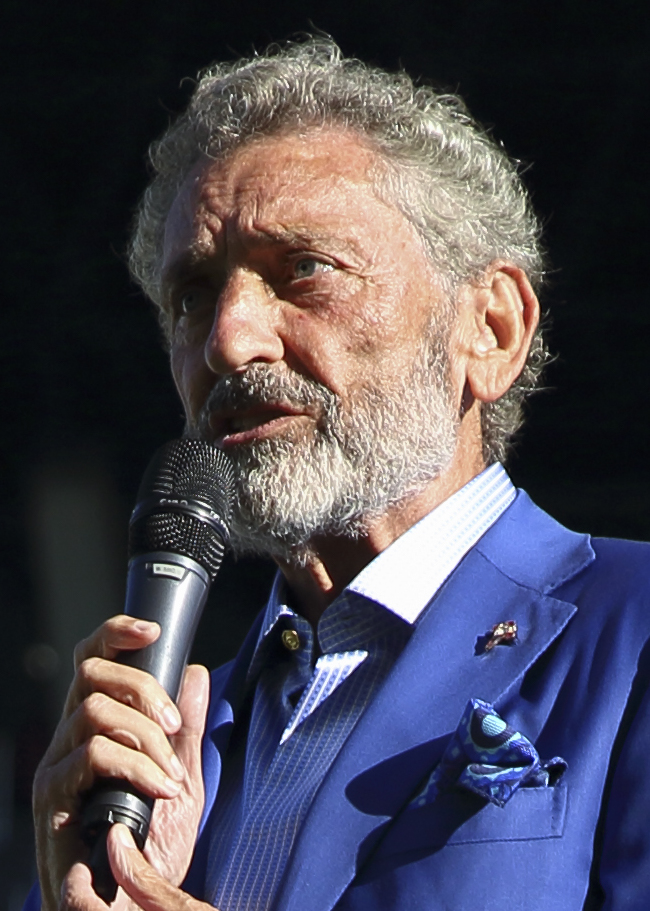
Carlos Mouriño was the club's president between 2006 and 2023

Real Club Celta de Vigo, S.A.D. is a sociedad anónima deportiva, a public limited sports company, owned by the Spanish-Mexican businessman Carlos Mouriño, who has been the majority shareholder since May 2006 when he acquired Horacio Gómez's 39.84% shareholding in the club. He currently owns 67.9% of the club through the holding company Grupo Corporativo Ges, S.L.

In October 2016, the club was the subject of a potential €100 million takeover by the Chinese CITS Group.

=== Board of directors ===
Position	Name
President	Marián Mouriño
Vice presidents	Ricardo Barros
Vice presidents	Pedro Posada
Board of directors	María José Táboas
Board of directors	Primitivo Ferro
Board of directors	Carmen Avendaño
Board of directors	José Fernando Rodilla
Managing director	Antonio Chaves
Financial director	María José Herbón
'Fundación Celta' director	Germán Arteta
Academy director	Carlos Hugo García
Business development director	Carlos Cao
Commercial director	Carlos Salvador
Marketing director	Maruxa Magdalena
Security director	Julio Vargas

Last updated: December 2023
Source: RC Celta

=== List of presidents ===
Dates	Name
1923–27	Manuel de Barcena y Andrés
1927–28	Ramón Fernández Mato
1928–29	Manuel Prieto González
1929–32	Alfredo Escobar
1932–33	Luis de Vicente Sasiáin
1933–34	Indalecio Vázquez
1934–35	Cesáreo González
1935–39	Rodrigo de la Rasilla
1939–40	Pedro Braña Merino

Dates	Name
1940–41	Manuel Núñez González
1941–42	Fernando de Miguel Rodríguez
1942–48	Luis Iglesias Fernández
1948–50	Avelino Ponte Caride
1950–52	Faustino Álvarez Álvarez
1952–56	Manuel Prieto Pérez
1956–58	Antonio Herrero Montero
1958–59	Antonio Alfageme
1959–61	Celso Lorenzo Vila

Dates	Name
1961–63	Carlos Barreras Barret
1963–64	Antonio Crusat Pardiñas
1964–65	Manuel Rodríguez Gómez
1965–69	Daniel Alonso González
1969–70	Ramón de Castro
1970–73	Rodrigo Alonso Fariña
1973–77	Antonio Vázquez Gómez
1977–80	Jaime Arbones Alonso
1980	Rodrigo Arbones Alonso

Dates	Name
1980	Elías Posada
1980–82	Elías Alonso Riego
1982–90	José Luis Rivadulla García
1990–91	José Luis Alejo Álvarez
1991	Eloy de Francisco
1991–95	José Luis Núñez Gallego
1995–06	Horacio Gómez Araújo
2006–2023	Carlos Mouriño
2023–	Marián Mouriño

== List of head coaches ==
List of Celta de Vigo head coaches since 1923.

- (England) Francis Cuggy (1923–1926)
- (Spain) Andrés Balsa (1926–1927)
- (Scotland) W. H. Cowan (1927–1928)
- (Spain) Ramón Encinas (1928–1931)
- (Spain) José Planas (1931–1932)
- (Spain) José María Peña (1932–1935)
- (Spain) Ricardo Comesaña (1935–1940)
- (Spain) Joaquín Cárdenes (1940–1941)
- (Spain) Baltasar Albéniz (1941–1944)
- (Hungary) Károly Plattkó (1944–1945)
- (Spain) Armando Ligorri (1945–1946)
- (Spain) Ricardo Zamora (1946–1949)
- (Spain) Luis Pasarín (1949–1951)
- (Spain) Roberto Ozores (1951–1952)
- (Spain) Odilio Bravo (1952–1953)
- (Spain) Armando Ligorri (1953)
- (Spain) José Iraragorri (1953)
- (Spain) Ricardo Zamora (1953–1955)
- (Spain) Luis Urquiri (1955–1956)
- (Argentina) Alejandro Scopelli (1956–1957)
- (Spain) Luis Pasarín (1957–1959)
- (Spain) Luis Miró (1959)
- (Argentina) Enrique Lúpiz (1959)
- (Spain) Baltasar Albéniz (1959)
- (Spain) Santiago Sanz Fraile (1959–1960)
- (Spain) Ricardo Zamora (1960)
- (Spain) Santiago Sanz Fraile (1960–1961)
- (France) Louis Hon (1961)
- (Spain) Juan Rodríguez Aretio (1961–1962)
- (Spain) Ignacio Eizaguirre (1962–1963)
- (Spain) Joseíto (1963–1965)
- (Spain) Rafa Yunta (1965–1966)
- (Spain) César (1966–1967)
- (Spain) Pepe Villar (1967)
- (Spain) Ignacio Eizaguirre (1967–1969)
- (Argentina) Roque Olsen (1969–1970)
- (Spain) Juan Arza (1970–1972)
- (Argentina) Pedro Dellacha (1972–1973)
- (Spain) Juan Rodríguez Aretio (1973)
- (Spain) Juan Arza (1973–1974)
- (Spain) Mariano Moreno (1974–1975)
- (Spain) Pepe Villar (1975)
- (Spain) Carmelo Cedrún (1975–1977)
- (Spain) Antonio Cuervo (1977)
- (Spain) Pepe Villar (1977)
- (Spain) José María Maguregui (1977–1978)
- (Spain) Laureano Ruiz (1978–1979)
- (Spain) Pedro González Carnero (1979)
- (Spain) Carmelo Cedrún (1979–80)
- (Spain) Juan Arza (1980)
- (Socialist Federal Republic of Yugoslavia) Milorad Pavić (1980–1983)
- (Spain) Carriega (1983)
- (Spain) Félix Carnero (1984–85)
- (Spain) José Luis García Traid (1985–1986)
- (Spain) Pepe Villar (1986)
- (England) Colin Addison (1986–1987)
- (Spain) José María Maguregui (1987–1988)
- (Spain) Pepe Villar (1988)
- (Spain) José Manuel Díaz Novoa (1988–1990)
- (Spain) José María Maguregui (1990–1991)
- (Spain) Txetxu Rojo (1991–1994)
- (Argentina) Carlos Aimar (1994–1995)
- (Spain) Fernando Castro Santos (1995–1997)
- (Spain) Javier Irureta (1997–1998)
- (Spain) Víctor Fernández (1998–2002)
- (Spain) Miguel Ángel Lotina (2002–2004)
- (Serbia and Montenegro) Radomir Antić (2004)
- (Spain) Ramón Carnero (2004)
- (Spain) Fernando Vázquez (2004–2007)
- (Bulgaria) Hristo Stoichkov (2007)
- (Spain) Juan Ramón López Caro (2007–2008)
- (Spain) Antonio López (2008)
- (Spain) Alejandro Menéndez (2008)
- (Spain) Pepe Murcia (2008–2009)
- (Spain) Eusebio Sacristán (2009–2010)
- (Spain) Paco Herrera (2010–2013)
- (Spain) Abel Resino (2013)
- (Spain) Luis Enrique (2013–2014)
- (Argentina) Eduardo Berizzo (2014–2017)
- (Spain) Juan Carlos Unzué (2017–2018)
- (Argentina) Antonio Mohamed (2018)
- (Portugal) Miguel Cardoso (2018–2019)
- (Spain) Fran Escribá (2019)
- (Spain) Óscar García Junyent (2019–2020)
- (Argentina) Eduardo Coudet (2020–2022)
- (Portugal) Carlos Carvalhal (2022–2023)
- (Spain) Rafael Benítez (2023–2024)
- (Spain) Claudio Giráldez (2024–present)

== Honours ==
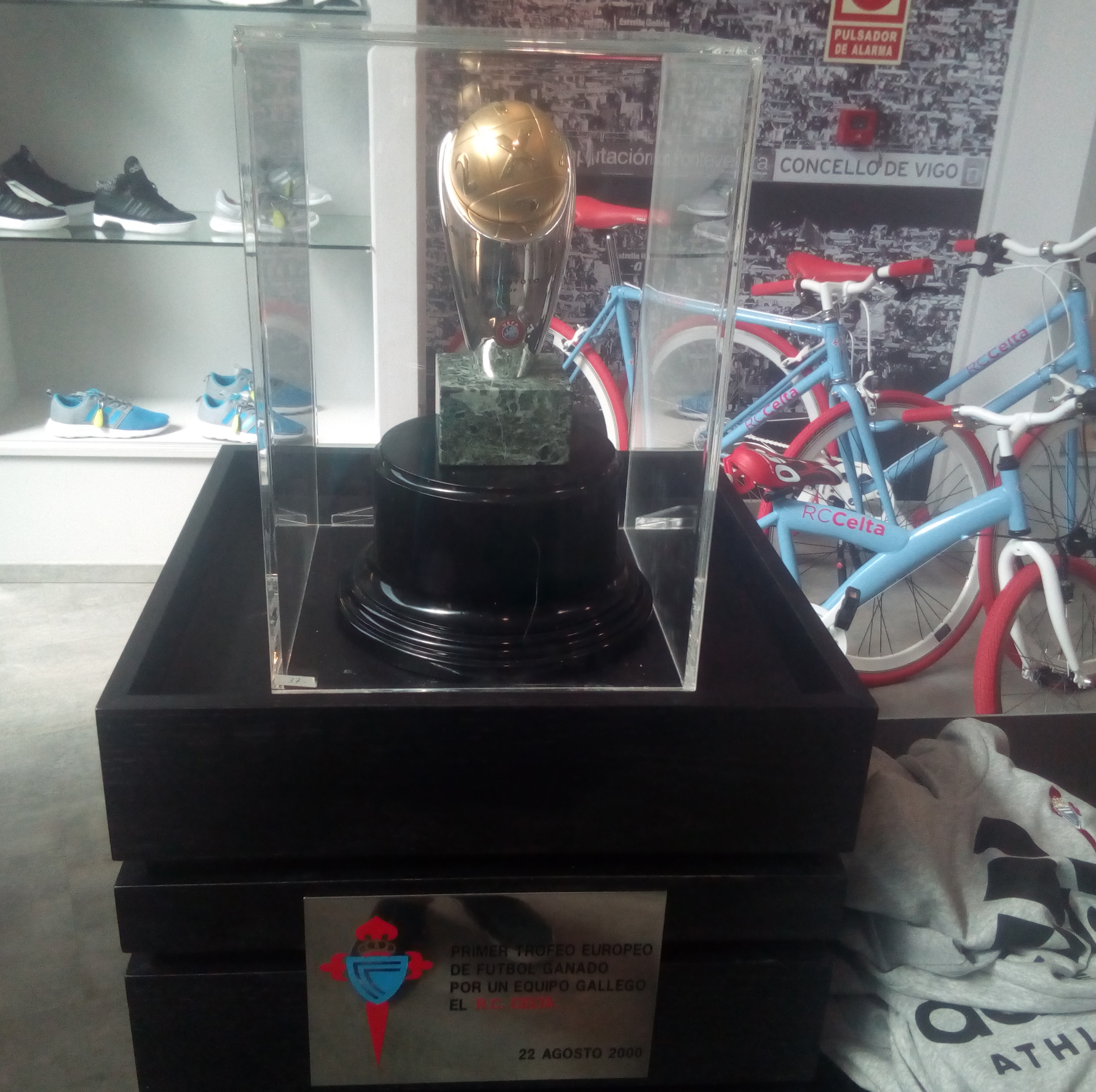
2000 Intertoto Cup

=== National titles ===
- Segunda División
  - Winners: 1935–36, 1981–82, 1991–92
- Segunda División B
  - Winners: 1980–81
- Tercera División
  - Winners: 1930–31
- Copa del Rey
  - Runners-up: 1947–48, 1993–94, 2000–01

=== European titles ===
- UEFA Intertoto Cup
  - Winners: 2000

=== Regional titles ===
- Galician Championship
  - Winners (6): 1923–24, 1924–25, 1925–26, 1929–30, 1931–32, 1933–34
- Asturian-Galician Championship (Galician Group)
  - Winners: 1934–35
- Regional Government of Galicia Cup
  - Winners: 2006
- Copa Galicia
  - Winners: 2008

=== Friendly and unofficial tournaments ===
- Trofeo Cidade de Vigo
  - Winners (21): 1972, 1973, 1975, 1976, 1980, 1984, 1986, 1988, 1991, 1992, 1993, 1997, 1998, 1999, 2000, 2002, 2005, 2006, 2008, 2009, 2012
- Trofeo Memorial Quinocho
  - Winners (21): 1995, 1996, 1998, 1999, 2000, 2001, 2002, 2003, 2004, 2005, 2007, 2008, 2009, 2011, 2012, 2013, 2014, 2015, 2016, 2022, 2023
- Trofeo Luis Otero
  - Winners (13): 1965, 1969, 1970, 1971, 1976, 1982, 1984, 1985, 1990, 1997, 2007, 2010, 2014
- Trofeo Emma Cuervo
  - Winners (9): 1954, 1961, 1968, 1975, 1977, 1979, 1981, 1997, 2010
- TIM Trophy
  - Winners: 2016
- Teresa Herrera Trophy
  - Winners: 1999
- Trofeo Xacobeo
  - Winners: 1999
- Trofeo Federación Galega
  - Winners: 2014
- Copa Comunidad Gallega
  - Winners: 2016

== Seasons ==
=== Domestic record ===
Celta Vigo's finishing positions in the Spanish football league system

Season	Tier	Division	Place	Copa del Rey
1923–24	—	1ª Reg.	1st	Quarter-finals
1924–25	—	1ª Reg.	1st	Semi-finals
1925–26	—	1ª Reg.	1st	Semi-finals
1926–27	—	1ª Reg.	2nd	Quarter-finals
1927–28	—	1ª Reg.	2nd	Quarter-finals
1928–29	2	2ª	9th	Round of 32
1930–31	3	3ª	1st	Round of 32
1931–32	2	2ª	9th	Semi-finals
1932–33	2	2ª	7th	Round of 32
1933–34	2	2ª	4th	Round of 16
1934–35	2	2ª	1st	Round of 16
1935–36	2	2ª	1st	Round of 16
1939–40	1	1ª	10th	Round of 16
1940–41	1	1ª	10th	Semi-finals
1941–42	1	1ª	5th	First round
1942–43	1	1ª	5th	Round of 16
1943–44	1	1ª	14th	Round of 16
1944–45	2	2ª	3rd	First round
1945–46	1	1ª	10th	Round of 16
1946–47	1	1ª	9th	Quarter-finals

Season	Tier	Division	Place	Copa del Rey
1947–48	1	1ª	4th	Runners-up
1948–49	1	1ª	11th	Round of 16
1949–50	1	1ª	7th	Round of 16
1950–51	1	1ª	8th	First round
1951–52	1	1ª	9th	First round
1952–53	1	1ª	13th	DNP
1953–54	1	1ª	10th	Round of 16
1954–55	1	1ª	11th	Round of 16
1955–56	1	1ª	10th	Round of 16
1956–57	1	1ª	13th	Quarter-finals
1957–58	1	1ª	7th	Round of 16
1958–59	1	1ª	16th	Round of 16
1959–60	2	2ª	2nd	First round
1960–61	2	2ª	2nd	Round of 32
1961–62	2	2ª	6th	Round of 32
1962–63	2	2ª	6th	First round
1963–64	2	2ª	9th	Round of 16
1964–65	2	2ª	5th	Round of 32
1965–66	2	2ª	2nd	Round of 32
1966–67	2	2ª	3rd	First round

Season	Tier	Division	Place	Copa del Rey
1967–68	2	2ª	3rd	Semi-finals
1968–69	2	2ª	2nd	DNP
1969–70	1	1ª	10th	Round of 16
1970–71	1	1ª	6th	Round of 16
1971–72	1	1ª	10th	Quarter-finals
1972–73	1	1ª	15th	Round of 16
1973–74	1	1ª	12th	Round of 32
1974–75	1	1ª	17th	Round of 16
1975–76	2	2ª	2nd	Round of 16
1976–77	1	1ª	17th	Quarter-finals
1977–78	2	2ª	3rd	Third round
1978–79	1	1ª	16th	Round of 16
1979–80	2	2ª	17th	Round of 16
1980–81	3	2ª B	1st	Third round
1981–82	2	2ª	1st	Third round
1982–83	1	1ª	17th	Round of 16
1983–84	2	2ª	6th	First round
1984–85	2	2ª	3rd	Third round
1985–86	1	1ª	18th	Quarter-finals
1986–87	2	2ª	1st	Third round

Season	Tier	Division	Place	Copa del Rey
1987–88	1	1ª	7th	Round of 16
1988–89	1	1ª	8th	Quarter-finals
1989–90	1	1ª	19th	Round of 16
1990–91	2	2ª	14th	Fifth round
1991–92	2	2ª	1st	Third round
1992–93	1	1ª	11th	Third round
1993–94	1	1ª	15th	Runners-up
1994–95	1	1ª	13th	Fourth round
1995–96	1	1ª	11th	Round of 16
1996–97	1	1ª	16th	Semi-finals
1997–98	1	1ª	6th	Round of 16
1998–99	1	1ª	5th	Round of 16
1999–00	1	1ª	7th	Round of 16
2000–01	1	1ª	6th	Runners-up
2001–02	1	1ª	5th	Round of 32
2002–03	1	1ª	4th	Round of 32
2003–04	1	1ª	19th	Quarter-finals
2004–05	2	2ª	2nd	Round of 64
2005–06	1	1ª	6th	Round of 16
2006–07	1	1ª	18th	Round of 32

Season	Tier	Division	Place	Copa del Rey
2007–08	2	2ª	16th	Second round
2008–09	2	2ª	17th	Round of 32
2009–10	2	2ª	12th	Quarter-finals
2010–11	2	2ª	6th	Second round
2011–12	2	2ª	2nd	Round of 32
2012–13	1	1ª	17th	Round of 16
2013–14	1	1ª	9th	Round of 32
2014–15	1	1ª	8th	Round of 16
2015–16	1	1ª	6th	Semi-finals
2016–17	1	1ª	13th	Semi-finals
2017–18	1	1ª	13th	Round of 16
2018–19	1	1ª	17th	Round of 32
2019–20	1	1ª	17th	Round of 32
2020–21	1	1ª	8th	Second round
2021–22	1	1ª	11th	Round of 32
2022–23	1	1ª	13th	Round of 32
2023–24	1	1ª	13th	Quarter-finals
2024–25	1	1ª	7th	Round of 16
2025–26	1	1ª	6th	Round of 32
2026–27	1	1ª		

- 61 seasons in La Liga
- 32 seasons in Segunda División
- 1 season in Segunda División B
- 1 season in Tercera División

=== European record ===
All results (home and away) list Celta's goal tally first.

Colour key

Wins
Draws
Losses

RC Celta de Vigo results in international competitions
Season	Competition	Round	Opponent	Home	Away	Aggregate
1971–72	UEFA Cup	First round	(Scotland) Aberdeen	0–2	0–1	0–3
1998–99	UEFA Cup	First round	(Romania) Argeș Pitești	7–0	1–0	8–0
1998–99	UEFA Cup	Second round	(England) Aston Villa	0–1	3–1	3–2
1998–99	UEFA Cup	Third round	(England) Liverpool	3–1	1–0	4–1
1998–99	UEFA Cup	Quarter-finals	(France) Marseille	1–2	0–0	1–2
1999–2000	UEFA Cup	First round	(Switzerland) Lausanne	4–0	2–3	6–3
1999–2000	UEFA Cup	Second round	(Greece) Aris	2–2	2–0	4–2
1999–2000	UEFA Cup	Third round	(Portugal) Benfica	7–0	1–1	8–1
1999–2000	UEFA Cup	Fourth round	(Italy) Juventus	4–0	0–1	4–1
1999–2000	UEFA Cup	Quarter-finals	(France) Lens	0–0	1–2	1–2
2000	UEFA Intertoto Cup	Third round	(North Macedonia) Pelister	3–0	2–1	5–1
2000	UEFA Intertoto Cup	Semi–finals	(England) Aston Villa	1–0	2–1	3–1
2000	UEFA Intertoto Cup	Finals	(Russia) Zenit Saint Petersburg	2–1	2–2	4–3
2000–01	UEFA Cup	First round	(Croatia) Rijeka	0–0	1–0	1–0
2000–01	UEFA Cup	Second round	(Federal Republic of Yugoslavia) Red Star Belgrade	0–1	3–0	3–1
2000–01	UEFA Cup	Third round	(Ukraine) Shakhtar Donetsk	0–0	1–0	1–0
2000–01	UEFA Cup	Fourth round	(Germany) VfB Stuttgart	0–0	2–1	2–1
2000–01	UEFA Cup	Quarter-finals	(Spain) Barcelona	3–2	1–2	4–4 (a)
2001–02	UEFA Cup	First round	(Czech Republic) Sigma Olomouc	4–0	3–4	7–4
2001–02	UEFA Cup	Second round	(Czech Republic) Slovan Liberec	3–1	0–3	3–4
2002–03	UEFA Cup	First round	(Denmark) Odense	2–0	0–1	2–1
2002–03	UEFA Cup	Second round	(Norway) Viking	3–0	1–1	4–1
2002–03	UEFA Cup	Third round	(Scotland) Celtic	2–1	0–1	2–2 (a)
2003–04	UEFA Champions League	Third qualifying round	(Czech Republic) Slavia Prague	3–0	0–2	3–2
2003–04	UEFA Champions League	Group H	(Netherlands) Ajax	3–2	0–1	2nd of 4
2003–04	UEFA Champions League	Group H	(Belgium) Club Brugge	1–1	1–1	2nd of 4
2003–04	UEFA Champions League	Group H	(Italy) Milan	0–0	2–1	2nd of 4
2003–04	UEFA Champions League	Round of 16	(England) Arsenal	2–3	0–2	2–5
2006–07	UEFA Cup	First round	(Belgium) Standard Liège	1–0	3–0	4–0
2006–07	UEFA Cup	Group H	(Germany) Eintracht Frankfurt	1–1	—N/a	2nd of 5
2006–07	UEFA Cup	Group H	(England) Newcastle United	—N/a	1–2	2nd of 5
2006–07	UEFA Cup	Group H	(Turkey) Fenerbahçe	1–0	—N/a	2nd of 5
2006–07	UEFA Cup	Group H	(Italy) Palermo	—N/a	1–1	2nd of 5
2006–07	UEFA Cup	Round of 32	(Russia) Spartak Moscow	1–1	2–1	3–2
2006–07	UEFA Cup	Round of 16	(Germany) Werder Bremen	0–1	0–2	0–3
2016–17	UEFA Europa League	Group G	(Netherlands) Ajax	2–2	2–3	2nd of 4
2016–17	UEFA Europa League	Group G	(Belgium) Standard Liège	1–1	1–1	2nd of 4
2016–17	UEFA Europa League	Group G	(Greece) Panathinaikos	2–0	2–0	2nd of 4
2016–17	UEFA Europa League	Round of 32	(Ukraine) Shakhtar Donetsk	0–1	2–0 (a.e.t.)	2–1
2016–17	UEFA Europa League	Round of 16	(Russia) Krasnodar	2–1	2–0	4–1
2016–17	UEFA Europa League	Quarter-finals	(Belgium) Genk	3–2	1–1	4–3
2016–17	UEFA Europa League	Semi-finals	(England) Manchester United	0–1	1–1	1–2
2025–26	UEFA Europa League	League phase	(Germany) VfB Stuttgart	—N/a	1–2	16th of 36
2025–26	UEFA Europa League	League phase	(Greece) PAOK	3–1	—N/a	16th of 36
2025–26	UEFA Europa League	League phase	(France) Nice	2–1	—N/a	16th of 36
2025–26	UEFA Europa League	League phase	(Croatia) Dinamo Zagreb	—N/a	3–0	16th of 36
2025–26	UEFA Europa League	League phase	(Bulgaria) Ludogorets Razgrad	—N/a	2–3	16th of 36
2025–26	UEFA Europa League	League phase	(Italy) Bologna	1–2	—N/a	16th of 36
2025–26	UEFA Europa League	League phase	(France) Lille	2–1	—N/a	16th of 36
2025–26	UEFA Europa League	League phase	(Serbia) Red Star Belgrade	—N/a	1–1	16th of 36
2025–26	UEFA Europa League	Knockout phase play-offs	(Greece) PAOK	1–0	2–1	3–1
2025–26	UEFA Europa League	Round of 16	(France) Lyon	1–1	2–0	3–1
2025–26	UEFA Europa League	Quarter-finals	(Germany) SC Freiburg	1–3	0–3	1–6
2026–27	UEFA Europa League	League phase	(Cyprus) Omonia	—N/a	0–1	
2026–27	UEFA Europa League	League phase	(Italy) Juventus	1–2	—N/a	
2026–27	UEFA Europa League	League phase	(Scotland) Celtic	—N/a	2–1	
2026–27	UEFA Europa League	League phase	(Belgium) Union Saint-Gilloise	1–2	—N/a	
2026–27	UEFA Europa League	League phase	(England) Bournemouth		—N/a	
2026–27	UEFA Europa League	League phase	(France) Marseille	—N/a		
2026–27	UEFA Europa League	League phase	(Israel) Hapoel Be'er Sheva	—N/a		
2026–27	UEFA Europa League	League phase	(Norway) Lillestrøm		—N/a	
