= Salvador López Sanz =

Spanish politician

Salvador López Sanz (1924 in Murcia, Spain – 6 February 2009) was a Spanish politician for the Spanish Socialist Workers' Party (PSOE).

López Sanz entered politics in the early 1980s when he was appointed Minister for Health and Social Security in the Generalitat Valenciana, the Valencian regional administration, in September 1981. He retained this position until August 1982 when he resigned after being elected to the Spanish Congress of Deputies representing Valencia Province and was re-elected in 1986 but did not stand at the 1989 General Election. He subsequently served as a Professor of Commercial Law.

His daughter, Mónica López, was elected MP in the Corts Valencianes, the Valencian Regional Parliament, in the 2007 election.
