= Erica Sanz Ginés =

Spanish trampoline gymnast (born 2003)

Personal information
- Born: May 24, 2003 (age 23) Valladolid, Spain

Sport
- Sport: Trampolining

Erica Sanz Ginés (born 2003) is a Spanish athlete who competes in trampoline gymnastics. Her younger sister Diana Sanz Ginés competes in the same sport.

She won two medals at the 2022 European Trampoline Championships; gold in the team trampoline event and bronze in the team double mini.

== Awards ==
European Championship
Year	Place	Medal	Type
2022	Rimini (Italy)	Gold	Team trampoline
2022	Rimini (Italy)	Bronze	Double mini per team
