= Diana Sanz Ginés =

Spanish trampoline gymnast (born 2005)

Personal information
- Born: 2005 (age 19–20); Valladolid, Spain

Sport
- Sport: Trampolining

Diana Sanz Ginés (born 2005) is a Spanish athlete who competes in trampoline gymnastics. Her older sister Erica Sanz Ginés competes in the same sport.

She won a bronze medal at the 2024 European Trampoline Championships.

== Awards ==
European Championship
Year	Place	Medal	Type
2024	Guimarães (Portugal)	Bronze	Equipment
