= 1947–48 Copa del Generalísimo =

1947-48 Copa del Generalísimo
46th Copa del Rey

Tournament details
- Country: Spain
- Teams: 140

Final positions
- Champions: Sevilla (3rd title)
- Runners-up: RC Celta de Vigo

Tournament statistics
- Matches played: 163

The 1947–48 Copa del Generalísimo was the 46th staging of the Copa del Rey, the Spanish football cup competition.

The competition began on 14 September 1947 and concluded on 4 July 1948 with the final.

== Fourth round ==
Team 1	Score	Team 2
Sociedad Gimnástica Lucense	5–2	Pontevedra CF
Cultural y Deportiva Leonesa	1–0	Círculo Popular
Real Santander SD	5–1	Cultural de Durango
CA Osasuna	4–1	Sociedad Gimnástica de Burgos
Club Atlético de Zaragoza	3–1	CD Logroñés
CF Reus Deportivo	1–2	UD Lérida
UD Sans	2–0	CD Júpiter
Tomelloso CF	5–0	Albacete Balompié
Crevillente CF	1–1	Imperial CF
CD Toledo	4–2	Real Ávila CF
Real Betis Balompié	2–1	CD Badajoz
CF Antequerano	2–0	Atlético Tetuán

- Tiebreaker

Team 1	Score	Team 2
Imperial CF	1–0	Crevillente CF

== Fifth round ==
Team 1	Score	Team 2
Sociedad Gimnástica Lucense	0–3	Club Ferrol
RC Deportivo de La Coruña	5–2	CA Osasuna
Cultural y Deportiva Leonesa	0–4	Real Oviedo CF
Real Santander SD	1–5	Real Gijón
Club Atlético de Zaragoza	0–3	Real Sociedad de Fútbol
UD Lérida	1–1	CD Sabadell CF
RCD Mallorca	2–2	Baracaldo CF
CF Badalona	5–3	UD Sans
Tomelloso CF	1–1	CD Alcoyano
CD Castellón	4–3	Hércules CF
Real Murcia CF	3–0	Levante UD
CD Mestalla	4–1	Imperial CF
Real Madrid CF	1–0	RCD Córdoba
CD Málaga	11–4	CD Toledo
Granada CF	4–1	Real Betis Balompié
Real Valladolid	5–0	CF Antequerano

Source: RSSSF

- Tiebreaker

Team 1	Score	Team 2
CD Sabadell CF	5–2	UD Lérida
Baracaldo CF	2–1	RCD Mallorca
CD Alcoyano	2–1	Tomelloso CF

== Sixth round ==
Team 1	Score	Team 2
Real Oviedo CF	4–1	RC Deportivo de La Coruña
Club Ferrol	4–1	Real Gijón
Real Sociedad de Fútbol	2–0	CD Sabadell CF
CF Badalona	3–1	Baracaldo CF
Real Madrid CF	4–2	CD Málaga
Real Valladolid	4–1	Granada CF
CD Castellón	3–0	CD Alcoyano
Real Murcia CF	5–0	CD Mestalla

Source: RSSSF

== Round of 16 ==
Team 1	Agg.	Team 2	1st leg	2nd leg
CF Badalona	2–3	CD Castellón	2–1	0–2
Club Atlético de Madrid	2–0	CF Barcelona	2–0	0–0
Valencia CF	7–0	Real Valladolid	6–0	1–0
Club Ferrol	2–6	RC Celta de Vigo	2–2	0–4
Club Atlético de Bilbao	2–3	Sevilla CF	2–1	0–2
RCD Español	3–1	Real Madrid CF	2–1	1–0
Club Gimnástico de Tarragona	4–6	Real Sociedad de Fútbol	2–3	2–3
Real Murcia CF	4–2	Real Oviedo CF	2–0	2–2

Source: RSSSF

== Quarter-finals ==
Team 1	Agg.	Team 2	1st leg	2nd leg
CD Castellón	1–8	Sevilla CF	1–1	0–7
RCD Español	4–2	Real Murcia CF	2–0	2–2
Real Sociedad de Fútbol	3–2	Valencia CF	3–2	0–0
Club Atlético de Madrid	6–7	RC Celta de Vigo	5–5	1–2

Source: RSSSF

== Semi-finals ==
Team 1	Agg.	Team 2	1st leg	2nd leg
Sevilla CF	7–2	Real Sociedad de Fútbol	7–1	0–1
RCD Español	3–3	RC Celta de Vigo	1–1	2–2

Source: RSSSF

- Tiebreaker

Team 1	Score	Team 2
RCD Español	2–2	RC Celta de Vigo
RCD Español	1–2	RC Celta de Vigo

== Third place ==
Team 1	Score	Team 2
RCD Español	3–1	Real Sociedad de Fútbol

== Final ==
Team 1	Score	Team 2
Sevilla CF	4–1	RC Celta de Vigo

Copa del Generalísimo
winners
Sevilla CF
3rd title
