= List of people from Bruges =

This is a list of notable people from Bruges, who were either born in Bruges, or spent part of their life there.

== People born in Bruges ==
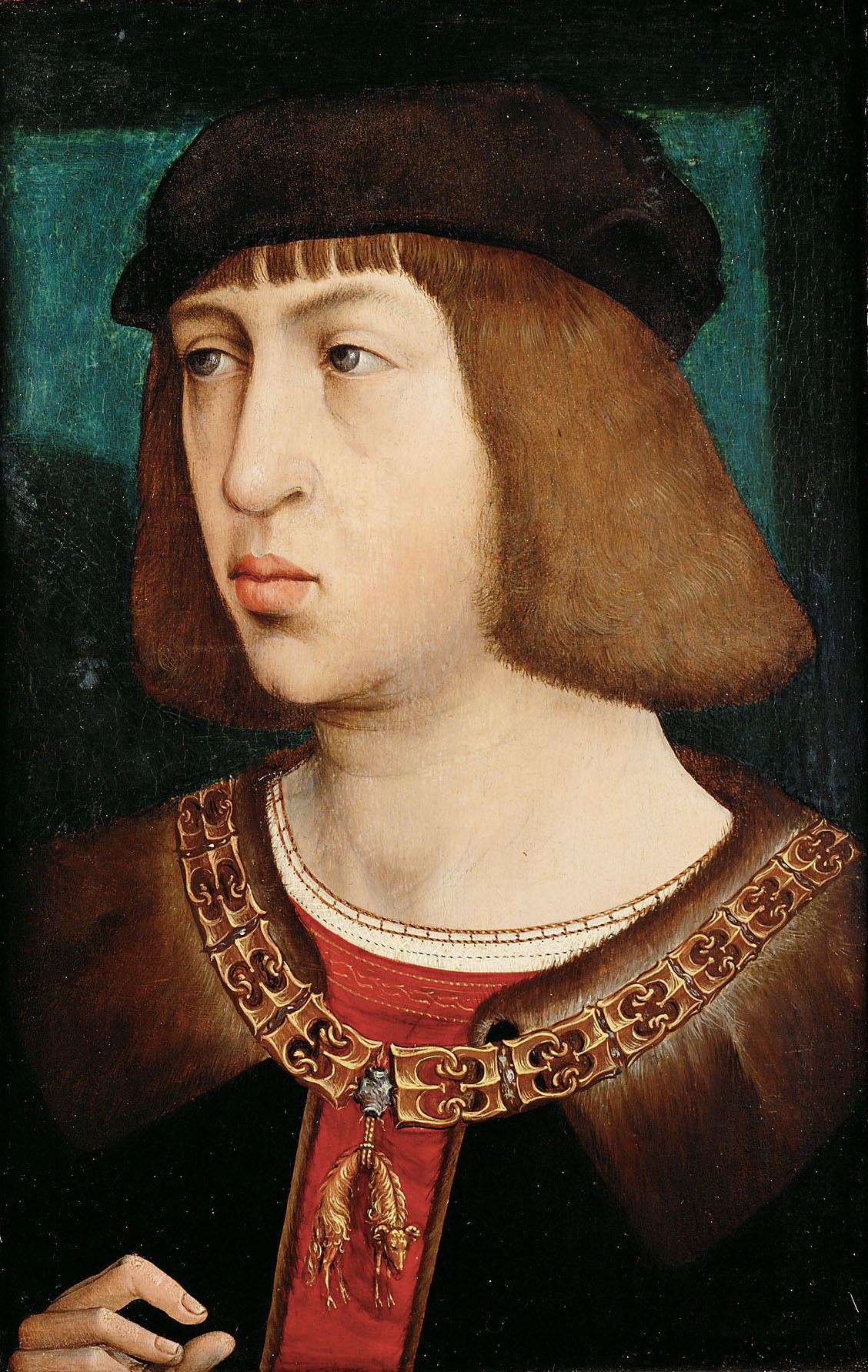
Philip I of Castile, Duke of Burgundy

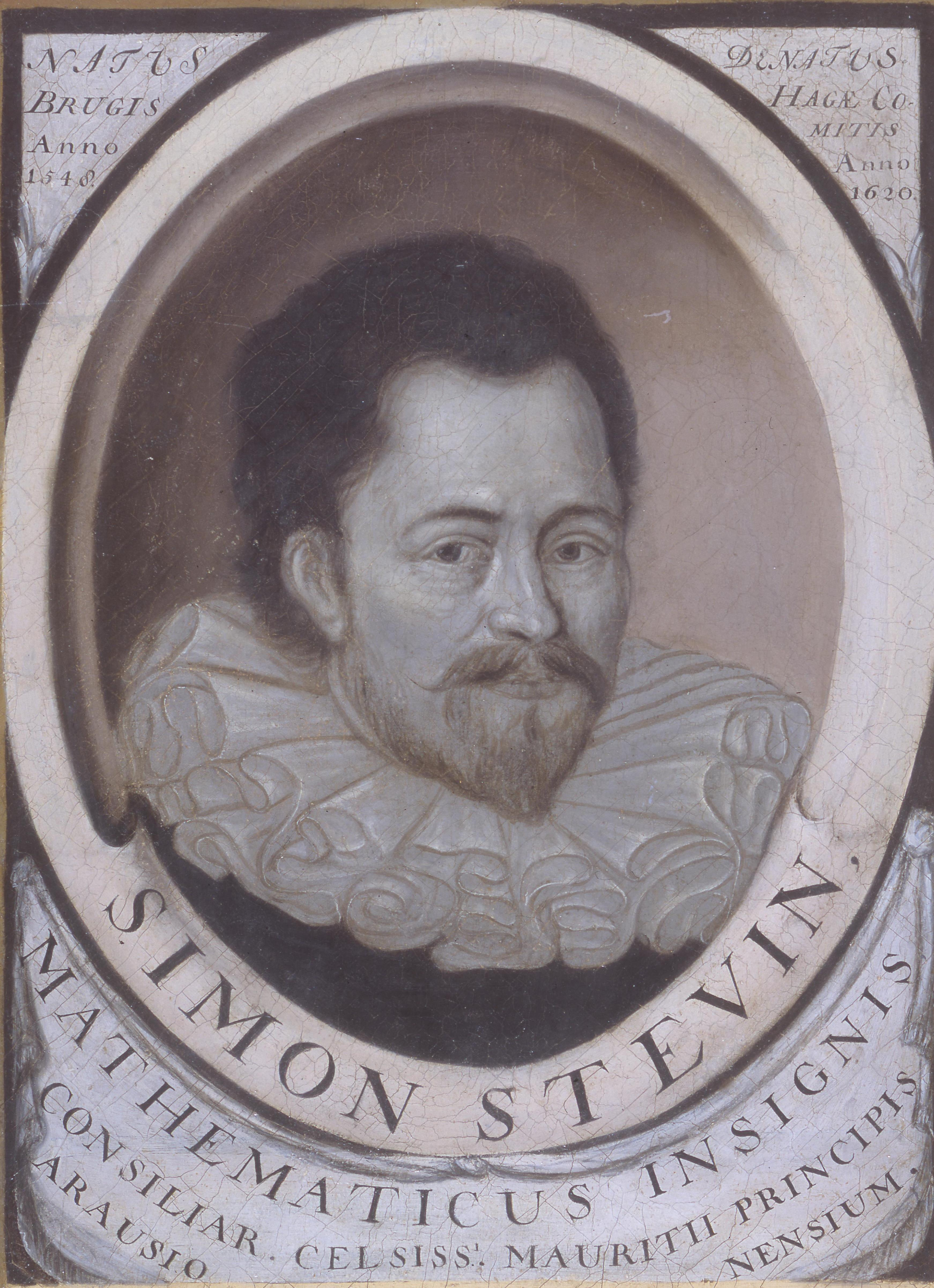
Simon Stevin, mathematician and engineer

=== Before the 19th century ===
- Jan Breydel, leader of the uprising against the French (13th century)
- Pieter de Coninck, weaver and leader of the uprising against the French (13th century)
- Joannes Corvus, portrait painter
- Jan Heem, craftsman and politician (13th century)
- Anselm Adornes, merchant, diplomat (8 December 1424 - 1483)
- Louis de Gruuthuse, Flemish knight, courtier, and nobleman (1427–1492)
- Philip I of Castile, first Habsburg ruler in Spain (1478–1506)
- Adriaen Isenbrant, Renaissance painter (1490–1551)
- Adrian Willaert, composer of the Renaissance (c. 1490 – 1562, birth in Bruges uncertain)
- Petrus Vulcanius, humanist scholar and administrator (c 1503-1571)
- Bonaventura Vulcanius, humanist scholar (1538-1614)
- Levina Teerlinc, Flemish miniaturist (1510–1576)
- Johannes Vasaeus, humanist, teacher, historian (1511-1561)
- Marcus Gheeraerts the Elder, engraver, illustrator, and painter (c. 1520 – c. 1590)
- Marcus Gheeraerts the Younger, painter (1561–1636)
- Stradanus, mannerist painter (1523–1605)
- Pamelius, theologian (1536–1587)
- Peter Candid, painter and architect (1548–1628, birth in Bruges uncertain)
- Simon Stevin, mathematician and engineer (1548–1620)
- Franciscus Gomarus, Calvinist theologian (1563–1641)
- Louis de Deyster, Flemish painter (1656–1711)

=== 19th century ===
- Henri Milne-Edwards, French zoologist (1800–1885)
- Eugène Charles Catalan, mathematician (1814–1894)
- Paul Jean Clays, marine painter (1819–1900)
- Émile Louis Victor de Laveleye, economist (1822–1892)
- Guido Gezelle, poet and priest (1830–1899)
- Louis Delacenserie, architect (1838–1909)
- Eugène Goossens, père, conductor (1845–1906)
- Albin van Hoonacker, Catholic theologian and Biblical scholar (1857–1933)
- Frank Brangwyn, Welsh artist, painter, colourist, engraver, and illustrator (1867–1956)
- Dobbelaer, a stained glass designer and maker (c. 1880)

=== 20th century ===
- Nelly Landry, French tennis player (1916–2010)
- Hugo Claus, novelist, poet, playwright, painter, and film director (1929–2008)
- Jean Schramme, colonel and mercenary in Katanga (1929–1988)
- Andries Van den Abeele, historian, historical preservationist, entrepreneur and politician (councilor and alderman of Bruges) (born 1935)
- Noël Devisch, agriculture (born 1943)
- Jean-Pierre Van Rossem, politician, entrepreneur, and writer (1945-2018)
- Alain Billiet, alleged designer of the euro sign (born 1951)
- Pierre Chevalier, politician (born 1952)
- Pieter Aspe, writer of detective stories (1953-2021)
- Kris Defoort, avant-garde jazz pianist and composer (born 1959)
- Frank Vanhecke, politician (born 1959)
- Geert Hoste, cabaret performer (born 1960)
- Filip Dewinter, politician (born 1962)
- Peter Verhelst, novelist, poet, and dramatist (born 1962)
- Peter Verhoyen, flautist and piccolo player (born 1968)
- Swen Vincke, video game director (born 1972)
- Geoffrey Claeys, football player (born 1974)
- Olivier De Cock, football player (born 1975)
- Denis Viane, football player (born 1977)
- Gotye, Australian-Belgian singer songwriter (born 1980)
- Tony Parker, basketball player (born 1982)

=== 21st century ===
- Thomas Van den Keybus, football player (born 2001)
- Brent Deklerck, trampolinist (born 2006)

== Lived in Bruges ==
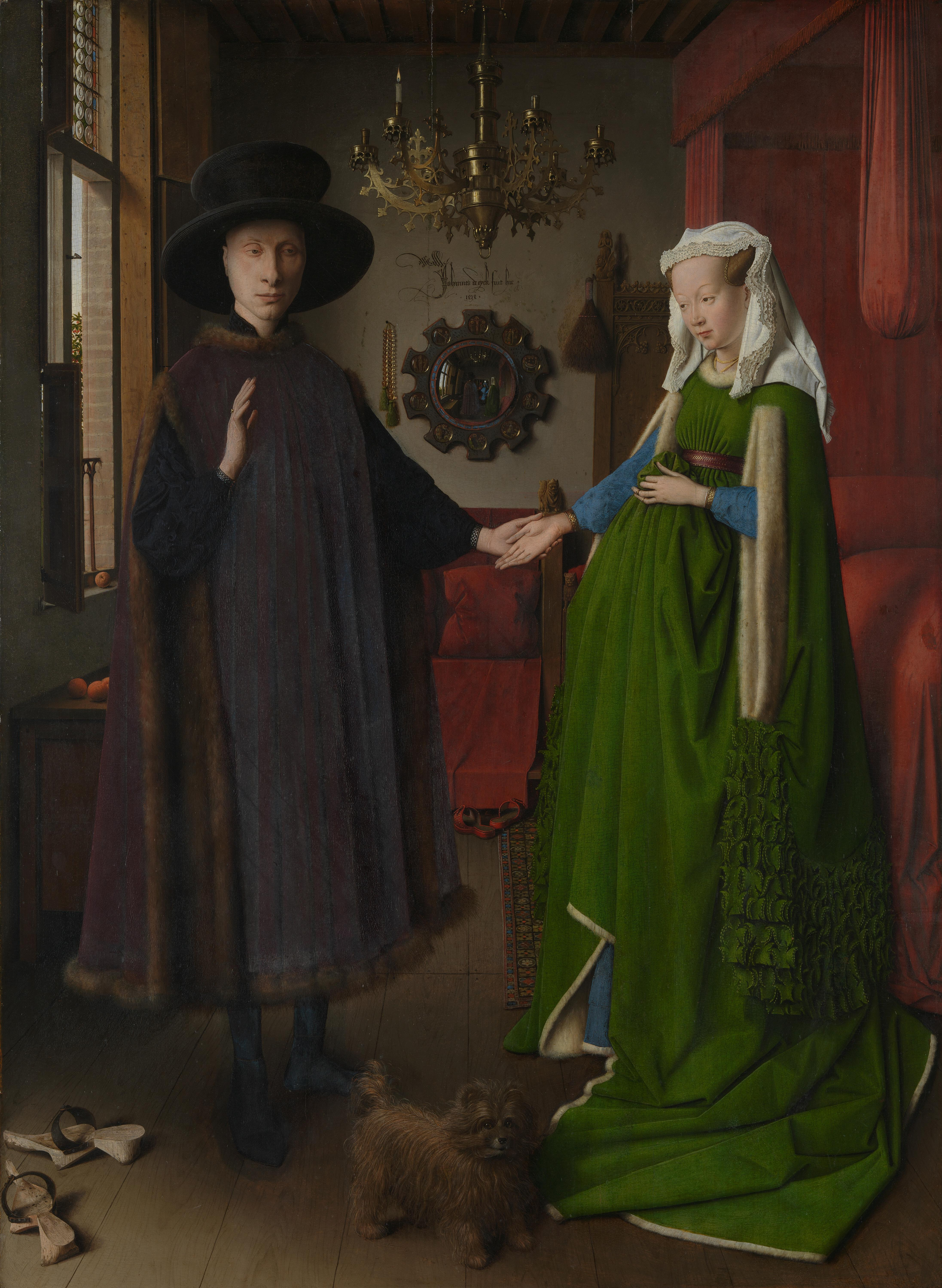
The Arnolfini Portrait by Jan van Eyck, 1434

=== 15th century ===
- Philip the Good, Duke of Burgundy
- Giovanni Arnolfini, Italian merchant
- Adrien Basin, Franco-Flemish composer, singer, and diplomat
- William Caxton, English merchant, diplomat, write, and printer
- Petrus Christus, Flemish painter
- Gerard David, Renaissance painter
- Lupus Hellinck, composer of the Renaissance
- Gilles Joye, Franco-Flemish composer of the Renaissance
- Roger Machado, diplomat and officer of arms
- Hans Memling, Flemish painter
- Tommaso Portinari, Italian banker for the Medici bank
- Jan Provoost, Flemish painter
- Jean Richafort, Franco-Flemish composer of the Renaissance
- Jan van Eyck, Flemish painter
- Juan Luís Vives, Spanish scholar and humanist

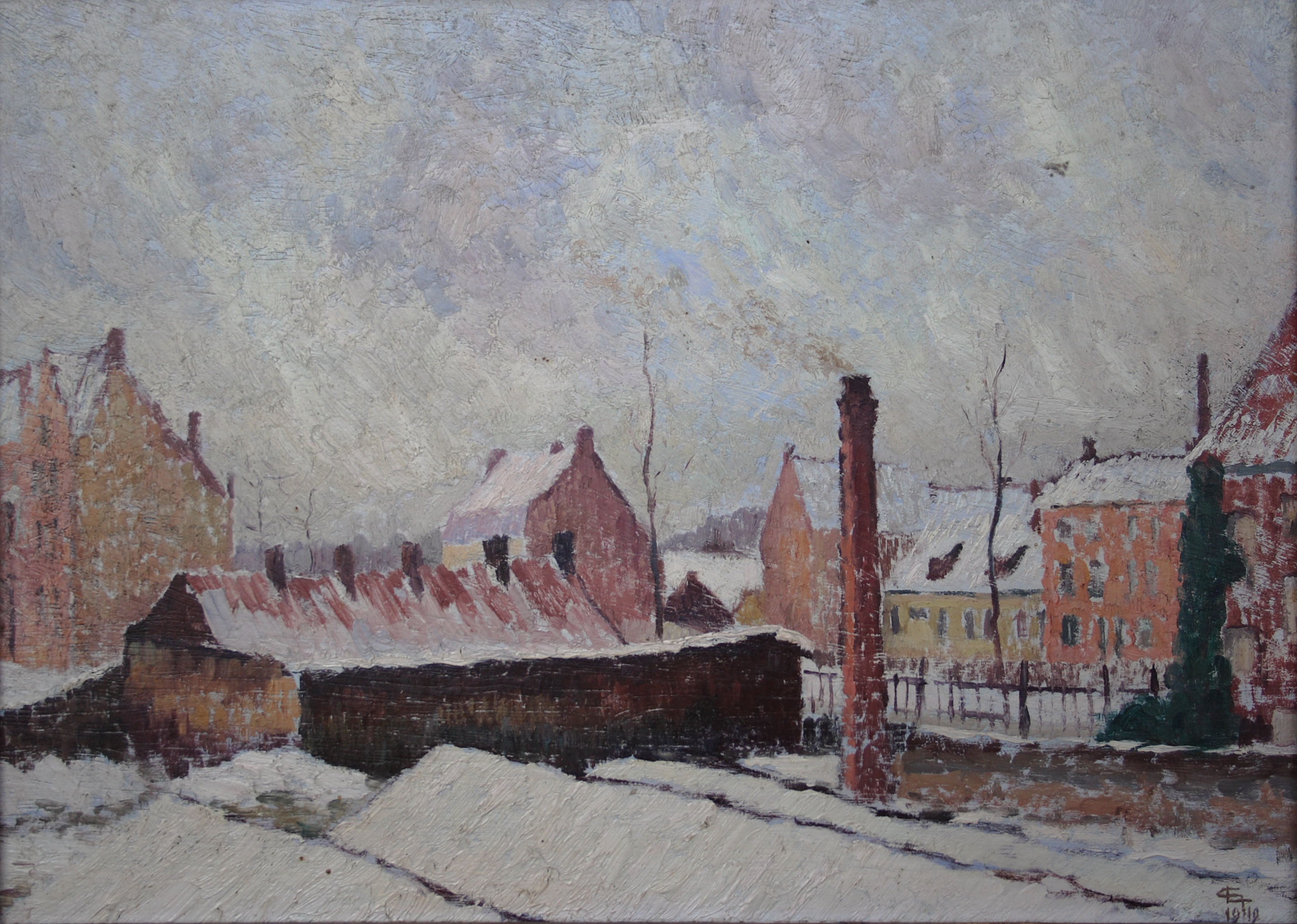
Georges Emile Lebacq, 1910 Snow at Bruges

=== 16th century until now ===
- George Cassander, Flemish theologian (1513–1566)
- Pieter Pourbus, Flemish Renaissance painter (1523–1584)
- Bernard Jungmann, German theologian and ecclesiastical historian (1833–1895)
- Fernand Khnopff, symbolist painter (1858–1921)
- Georges Emile Lebacq, Belgian artist, painter, colourist, pastellist, Impressionist, Post-Impressionist (1876–1950)
- Karel Verleye and Hendrik Brugmans, founders of the College of Europe
- Godfried Danneels, archbishop and cardinal (born 1933)
- Pieter Aspe, writer
- Salah Abdeslam Terrorist accused of involvement in the November 2015 Paris Attacks, and the March 2016 Brussels Attacks. (Born September 15, 1989)
