= Thomas Legh (lawyer) =

English jurist and diplomat

Sir Thomas Leigh or Legh (c. 1511 – 1545) was an English jurist and diplomat, who played a key role as agent of Henry VIII and Thomas Cromwell in the Dissolution of the Monasteries.

== Life ==
The younger son of John Leigh, lord of the manor of Frizington, Cumberland, he was a cousin of Bishop Rowland Leigh (or Lee), scions of the ancient Leigh family of West Hall, High Legh, Cheshire.

Leigh was educated at Eton College before entering King's College, Cambridge proceeding LLB in 1527, and LLD in 1531. He was called to the Bar 7 October 1531. In December 1532 he was appointed ambassador to the King of Denmark; Imperial Ambassador Eustace Chapuys was unimpressed with Dr Leigh at this time. He was recalled from Denmark in March 1533, then being employed in 1533 by his cousin the bishop. He cited Catherine of Aragon to appear before Thomas Cranmer and hear the final divorce sentence in 1533, and in the same year also conducted an inquiry at Rievaulx Abbey which led to the resignation of the abbot. In January 1533-4 he was sent on another embassy to the Low Countries, passing through Antwerp and Lübeck. He returned to England in April, went again to Hamburg in May, and must have returned once more in the summer.

On 4 June 1535 Richard Layton wrote to Cromwell recommending Leigh and himself to be Visitors of the northern religious houses. Leigh, however, was first sent with Sir John Price (or ap Rice); in July 1535 they went to Worcester, and then visited, 3 July Malvern, 20 August Lacock Abbey (after Malmesbury, Bradstock, and Stanley), 23 August Bruton Abbey, 3 September Wilton, 11 September Wherwell, 24 September Witney, 25 September Reading, 29 September Haliwell, 17 October Royston, and 19 October Walden. Leigh made a large profit out of the visitation, and complaints of his conduct were numerous. Leigh was always accompanied by fourteen men in livery and his brother, all of whom had to be rewarded. His style was flamboyant, and Cromwell found fault with him. Sir John ap Rice, who thought his treatment of the monks needlessly severe, describes his insolence. To Leigh's suggestion was due the suspension of the bishops' authority during the visitation.

At Cambridge Leigh's changes were few; he ordered (22 October 1535) the charters to be sent up to London with a rental of the university possessions, tried to pacify the strife among the nations, and established a lecture in divinity. Thomas Goodrich, Bishop of Ely, wrote approvingly of his proceedings. Leigh went on to Bury, 4 November; Westacre, 11 November, after West Dereham; Norwich, 19 November; Ipswich, 27 November; and meeting Richard Layton at Lichfield at Christmas 1535 he proceeded with him to the northern visitation.

The mastership of Sherburn Hospital in Durham was granted to Leigh on 14 September 1535. He also acquired the advowson of Birmingham from Gisborough Priory in March 1536; Calder Abbey in Cumberland was granted to him in 1539, and Nostell Priory in Yorkshire, with its cell at Stowkirke, in 1539–40. A letter of May 1536 to Johannes Aepinus shows that he was acquainted with Melanchthon and Oldendorpius. In 1536 he assisted at the trial of Anne Boleyn.

During the Pilgrimage of Grace in 1536 he was as unpopular as his colleague Layton; they sang ballads about him and Leigh as one of the three L's (Richard Layton, dean of York and John Longland, bishop of Lincoln, were the other two) one ballad; and they hanged his cook. He meanwhile was busy taking money to the forces, and when the rebellion was over he tried the prisoners. In August 1536 he had made a tour through the Midlands archdeaconries of Coventry and Stafford, and was much distressed by the open adultery of the country gentlemen. He married in 1536, and was reprimanded by his friends for not informing them of it.

Some time in the early part of 1537 he became a master in chancery, and throughout 1538, 1539, and 1540 he was engaged in suppressing religious houses. In 1543 Leigh went from York to Canterbury to investigate the plot against Thomas Cranmer. He was knighted at Leith by the Earl of Hertford, on 11 May 1544, during the war known the Rough Wooing.

Leigh was a Member (MP) of the Parliament of England for Hindon in 1536 and for Wilton in 1545. He died 25 November 1545, and was buried at St. Leonard's, Shoreditch, London, where a tomb with a rhyming inscription was erected in his memory.

== Marriage ==
His widow Dame Joanna (née Cotton) remarried Sir Thomas Chaloner, and died 11 January 1557.

Their only child, Catherine Leigh, married James Blount, 6th Baron Mountjoy, and had issue including Charles Blount, 1st Earl of Devonshire.

== Notes ==
- This article incorporates text from a publication now in the public domain: "Legh, Thomas". Dictionary of National Biography. London: Smith, Elder & Co. 1885–1900.
