= William Blount, 7th Baron Mountjoy =

William Blount
- Born: c. 1561
- Died: 1594 (aged c. 33); Hooke, England, Kingdom of England
- Parent(s): James Blount; Catherine Leigh

William Blount, 7th Baron Mountjoy (c. 1561 – 1594), was an English peer.

William Blount was born around 1561, the eldest son of James Blount (c. 1533-1582) and Catherine Leigh. He inherited his title on the death of his father. He never married.

On his death in 1594 in Hook, Dorset, the title passed to his younger brother Charles Blount.

== Ancestry ==
Ancestors of William Blount, 7th Baron Mountjoy

William Blount
Charles Blount
Alice Keble
James Blount
Ann Willoughby
William Blount
Catherine Leigh

Peerage of England
Preceded by James Blount	Baron Mountjoy; 1582–1594	Succeeded by Charles Blount
