= Petrus Vulcanius =

Belgian humanist scholar and government official

Petrus Vulcanius, otherwise Pieter De Smet (c. 1503 – 1571) was a humanist scholar and local government official of Bruges.

== Life ==
Petrus Vulcanius, born Pieter De Smet in Bruges, was the son of Andries De Smet and Margriete Krippijn. He was educated in the Bogaerdenschool in Bruges, a school for poor and abandoned children, supported by the city. In June 1523 he was registered at the University of Leuven as a "poor man" (arme). Here too he was supported financially by the city of Bruges. He was awarded a degree in law in 1527.

He continued his studies at the Collegium Trilingue in Leuven, where he further developed his skills in Latin and Greek.

He gained the friendship of Erasmus, of the Hellenist J. van Stazeele, and of the teacher of Hebrew, John van Campen, and was also close to his fellow townsmen Johannes Vasaeus (Jan Was) and Jacob van Halewijn, a canon in the chapter of the Church of Our Lady in Bruges.

Thanks to the recommendations of Erasmus and of Juan Luis Vives, Vulcanius lived in London between 1529 and 1531 as the tutor of Charles Blount, son of William Blount, Lord Mountjoy. On 1 September 1531 he was appointed taalman, or legal functionary, of the city of Brugge. From this time onwards he maintained relations with many humanists both in Bruges, such as Vives, Jacobus Curtius, Jan Fevijn and Joris Cassander, and many others outside the city.

In 1543 Vulcanius undertook a long journey to Germany and Italy. In the same year he married Adrianette Truwaert. They had five children, including Bonaventura Vulcanius.

On 1 February 1550 Petrus Vulcanius was appointed administrator (stadspensionaris) of Middelburg in Zeeland.

His career reached its highest point when in February 1557 he was appointed procurator of the Great Council of Mechelen, an office which he retained until his death in Mechelen in 1571.

== Sources ==
- Dewitte, Alfons, 1978: Peter en Bonaventura De Smet, alias Vulcanius, in: Handelingen van het genootschap voor geschiedenis in Brugge, 1978, pp. 17–42.
