= Eliseus Bomelius =

German physician and astrologer

Eliseus Bomelius (also Licius) (died c. 1579) was a German physician and astrologer.

== Early life ==
The son of Henry Bomelius from Bommel in the Netherlands, from 1540 to 1559 Lutheran preacher at Wesel in Westphalia and friend of John Bale, he was said by his contemporaries to have been born at Wesel. He was educated at the University of Cambridge, where he proceeded to the degree of doctor of medicine.

Bomelius was well received by English Protestant reformers, and contributed in Latin elegiacs to an edition of Thomas Becon's early works published in 1560. Henry Bennet of Calais praised James Blount, 6th Baron Mountjoy in 1561, praised Mountjoy for employing Bomelius as a humanist recommended by Philip Melanchthon. A little later Bomelius is said to have lived in the house of John Lumley, 1st Baron Lumley.

== In conflict with the College of Physicians ==
As a physician and astrologer Bomelius made a high reputation in London. Sir William Cecil is said to have consulted Bomelius as to the queen's length of life, during one of the early negotiations for her marriage. In 1567 he was arrested at the instance of Thomas Francis, president of the London College of Physicians, for practising medicine without license of the college. He was lodged in the King's Bench prison, and 27 May 1567 he wrote to Cecil asking for an opportunity to expose Francis's ignorance of astronomy and Latin; and petitioned for his release. and for financial assistance. On 3 May 1568 he supplicated at Oxford for incorporation as a doctor of medicine of Cambridge. Early in 1569 Bomelius's wife stated before the council of the College of Physicians that her husband had given due satisfaction for his offence to the queen and the lord treasurer, and petitioned for the council's consent to his liberation. The council demanded payment of a fine and costs, which Bomelius's poverty did not allow him to pay. On 2 June 1569 the council appears to have offered Bomelius his release on condition of his giving a bond to abstain henceforth from the practice of medicine; but early in 1570 he would seem to have been still a prisoner, and his wife was in frequent communication with Archbishop Matthew Parker as to the conditions of his release.

Before Easter 1570 Bomelius was an "open prisoner" of the King's Bench, and in April 1570 Parker was intending to take a bond from Bomelius to leave the country. Bomelius diverted this outcome by announcing in a letter to Parker that he had knowledge of a terrible danger hanging over England. The archbishop sent the letter to Cecil and urged him to examine Bomelius in the privy council. But Cecil entered into private correspondence with the doctor in the expectation of discovering a conspiracy. What Bomelius communicated to Cecil was a statement on the queen's nativity, and a portion of a book De Utilitate Astrologiæ, in which he claimed that great revolutions take place every 500 years, and that as rather more than 500 years had elapsed since the Norman Conquest, England must be in imminent peril. Cecil treated Bomelius's announcements as worthless.

== In Russia ==
Russian ambassador Andrei Sovin, who was in London at the time, offered to take Bomelius to Russia. The English government did not hinder his departure, and late in 1570 Bomelius, who had promised to supply Cecil with political information and to send him small presents yearly, was settled in Russia. When Sir Jerome Horsey began his travels in 1572, he frequently met Bomelius at Moscow, and he wrote that Bomelius was then living in pomp at the court of Ivan the Terrible.

Horsey's account was that Bomelius was in high favour with the tsar as a magician, and held an official position in the household of the tsarevich. He had amassed great wealth, which he sent to England via Wesel, and was encouraging the tsar, by astrological calculations, to persist in a project of marrying Queen Elizabeth. But he was, according to Horsey, an enemy of England.

Bomelius was charged (about 1574) with intriguing with the kings of Poland and Sweden against the tsar. He was racked, but refused to incriminate himself. Subjected to further tortures, he died in a dungeon. In 1583 Bomelius's widow returned to England with Sir Jerome Bowes.

== Works ==
No scholarly books of Bomelius are now known, though Henry Bennet of Calais, in his Life of Œcolampadius, alluded to them. An almanacke and pronostication of master Elis Bomelius for ye yere of our lorde god 1567 autorysshed by my lorde of London (i.e. Edmund Grindal) was entered on the Stationers' register for 1566–67 but is not extant. According to Thomas Tanner, it dealt with the effects of two eclipses, is now known to be extant. Prescriptions or recipes in Gervase Markham's English Housewife (1631) were attributed to a manuscript by Bomelius and Burchard Kranich. A recent editor of the work has cast doubt on the provenance, while leaving open the possibility that these recipes were traditional.

== Notes ==
Attribution

This article incorporates text from a publication now in the public domain: Stephen, Leslie, ed. (1886). "Bomelius, Eliseus". Dictionary of National Biography. Vol. 5. London: Smith, Elder & Co.
