= Charles Blount, 8th Baron Mountjoy =

English statesman (1563–1606)

The Right Honourable The Lord Mountjoy KG
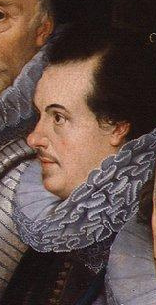
- Baron Mountjoy: extract from The Somerset House Conference (1604)
- Predecessor: William Blount, 7th Baron Mountjoy
- Other titles: 1st Earl of Devonshire
- Born: 1563; Hooke Park, Dorset, England
- Died: 3 April 1606 (aged 42–43); Savoy House, London, England
- Spouse: Penelope Devereux
- Issue: Penelope Rich; Mountjoy Blount, 1st Earl of Newport; Elizabeth/Isabella Blount; St John Blount; Charles Blount
- Parents: James Blount, 6th Baron Mountjoy; Catherine Leigh

Charles Brooke Blount, 1st Earl of Devonshire, KG (pronounced Blunt; 1563 – 3 April 1606), was an English nobleman and soldier who served as Lord Deputy of Ireland under Elizabeth I, and later as Lord Lieutenant of Ireland under James I. He was instrumental in forcing the Irish confederacy's surrender in the Nine Years' War. He is also known for his scandalous affair with married noblewoman Penelope Rich, whom he later married.

Blount entered court around 1583 and quickly found favour with the queen. He succeeded to the family title as 8th Baron Mountjoy in 1594. After the Earl of Essex's failed Irish campaign, Blount was appointed as Lord Deputy and commanded the Crown's forces during the final years of the Nine Years' War. He was able to defeat confederacy leader Hugh O'Neill, Earl of Tyrone, and the 4th Spanish Armada at the Siege of Kinsale, and captured Tyrone's headquarters at Dungannon before peace was agreed at the Treaty of Mellifont in 1603.

The old title of Earl of Devon was recreated for him in 1603, after returning to England, but he is usually referred to as Baron Mountjoy (his title during the most prominent period of his career). Since it was much later decided that the "Devon" earldom had not in fact become extinct, but was merely dormant in 1603, he is usually now regarded retrospectively as the 1st Earl of Devonshire. He is not related to the later Cavendish Earls (then Dukes) of Devonshire from the second creation in 1618.

== Early life and education ==
Charles Brooke Blount was born in 1563, the second son of James Blount, 6th Baron Mountjoy, and Catherine Leigh. His paternal grandfather was courtier Charles Blount, 5th Baron Mountjoy. His maternal grandfather was Thomas Leigh of St Oswald's, Yorkshire, a lawyer who played a key role in the Dissolution of the Monasteries. Blount was also a distant cousin of soldier Christopher Blount.

Charles Blount studied at Oxford for a short time, then went on to study at either the Inner Temple or the Middle Temple of the four Inns of Court. When his father died in 1581, the title of Baron Mountjoy passed to Blount's elder brother William.

His father's poor business ventures had greatly diminished the Blount family's estates. From youth, Charles Blount aimed to recover his family's reputation and wealth. When he had his portrait painted as a boy, he insisted on it being inscribed with the motto "ad reædificandam antiquam domum" ("to rebuild an old house").

== At court ==
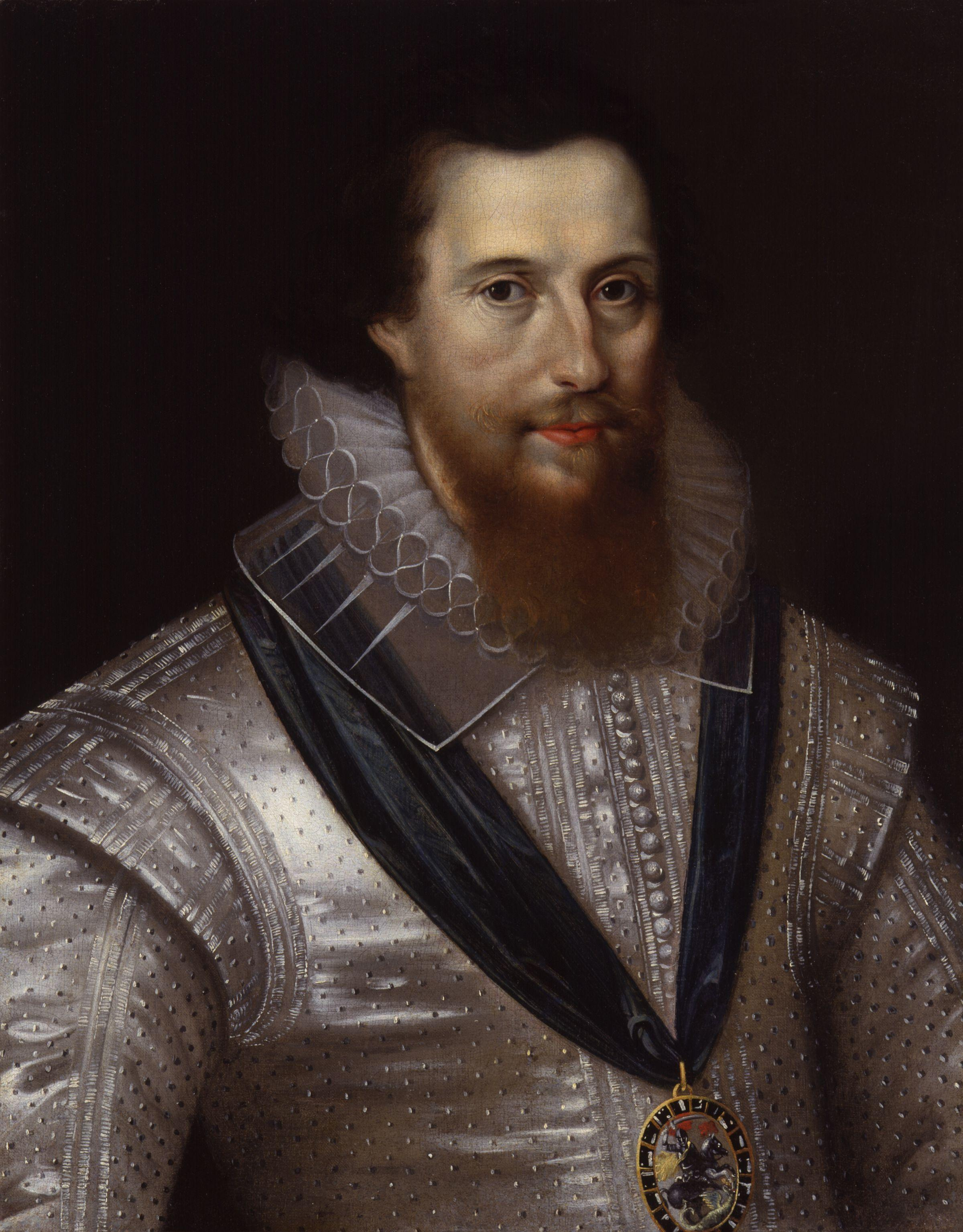
Robert Devereux, 2nd Earl of Essex, was Mountjoy's rival and later close friend.

Charles Blount was introduced to court around 1583, and he quickly found favour with Queen Elizabeth I due to his "youthful good looks". One of her earliest remarks to him was "Fail you not to come to court, and I will bethink myself how to doe you good". This attention aroused the jealousy of royal favourite Robert Devereux, 2nd Earl of Essex. Elizabeth is said to have rewarded Blount with "a queen at chesse of gold richly enamelled" for his skill in a tilting match "which his servant had the next day fastened on his arme with a crimson ribband". Essex noticed the token and angrily remarked at court to Sir Fulk Greville, "Now I perceive every fool must have a favour." The speech was reported to Blount, and a duel followed, near Marybone Park, in which Essex was wounded. Subsequently Blount and Essex became close friends.

Charles Blount was returned to the Commons as MP for St Ives, Cornwall, in 1584 and for Bere Alston in 1586 and 1593.

Blount was knighted in 1586. He was created M.A. from Oxford on 16 June 1589.

Charles Blount succeeded as 8th Baron Mountjoy on the death in 1594 of his brother William, who had no issue. He was made a Knight of the Garter.

== Military career ==
Between 1586 and 1598, Charles spent most of his time on the Continent, serving in the Netherlands and Brittany. He joined Essex and Walter Raleigh in their expedition to the Azores in 1597, along with his cousin Christopher. He was frequently absent from court to further his military career. In response, the Queen states to him that "you shall go when I send you; in the mean time, see that you lodge in the court where you may follow your books, read, and discourse of warre".

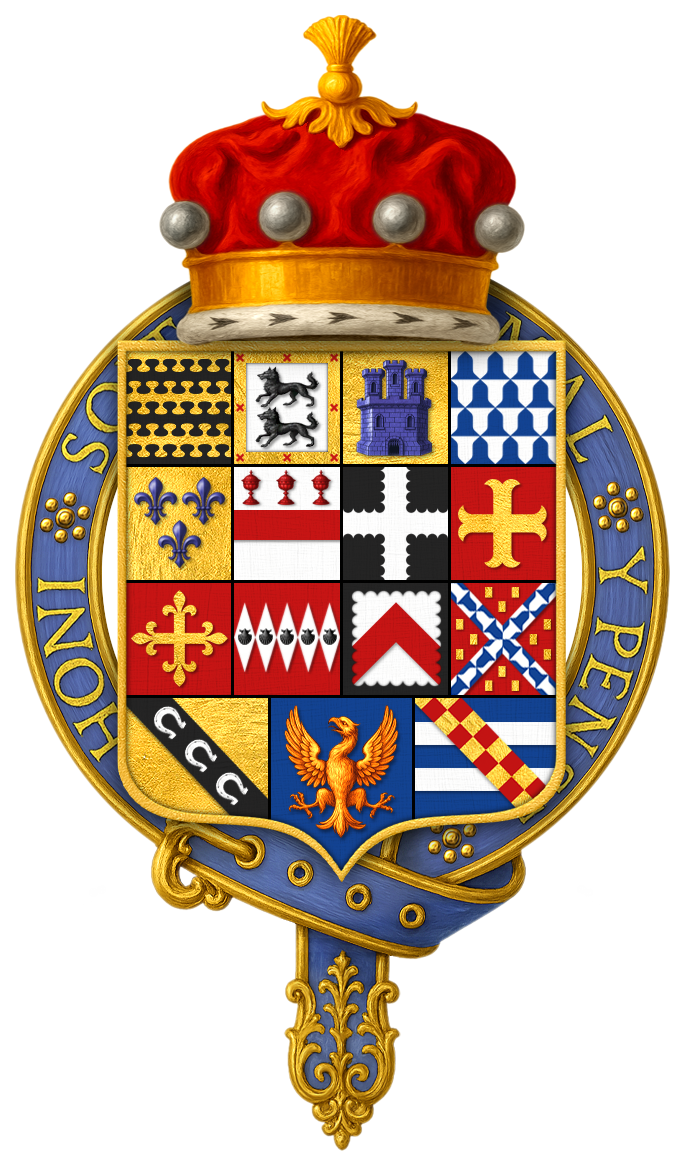
Arms as Lord Mountjoy, KG (after 1597), viz: Barry nebuly of six Or and Sable

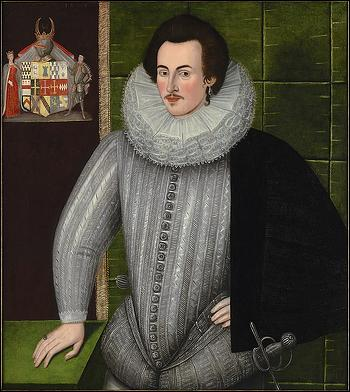
Portrait of Mountjoy by unknown artist, c. 1594

== Ireland ==
The downfall of Lord Essex did no damage to Lord Mountjoy's career. After the failure of his rebellion, Essex shocked many by denouncing his sister Penelope, who was Mountjoy's mistress, as a traitor, which inevitably raised the question of his own possible involvement; but the Crown, anxious to retain Mountjoy's services, and also to show as much leniency as possible to the defeated rebels, simply ignored the accusation.

On 24 February 1600, Mountjoy landed in Ireland as Lord Deputy following Lord Essex and in the ensuing years brought the Nine Years' War to an end. The leader of the rebellion, Hugh O'Neill, Earl of Tyrone, wrote about Mountjoy's "refined manners" that he would lose a whole season of campaigning "while waiting until breakfast is prepared to his mind!". Despite this, Mountjoy proved that he was quite qualified to pursue the war.

In early 1600, Mountjoy had dispatched Sir Henry Docwra with an army of 4,200 troops to land at Culmore to erect a fortress commanding the shores of Lough Foyle in the north-west of Ulster. To prevent Hugh O'Neill from sending a strong force to repulse Dowcra's forces, Mountjoy advanced in force from Dublin to Newry causing O'Neill to fear a southern advance into Tyrone.

Mountjoy aimed to avoid the mistakes of previous Lords-Deputy. After the Battle of Moyry Pass, he had it cleared and a garrison established there. It had long been a problem for English forces advancing into Ulster from the south. He also established posts with garrisons at Mountnorris and Armagh.

On 13 July 1601, Mountjoy with his army along with Turlough MacHenry O'Neill of the Fews who had recently switched to the English side in the war, had a stand-off with Hugh O'Neill's forces at the River Blackwater. After a few shots in vain from either side, O'Neill's forces withdrew and Mountjoy sent his forces to occupy the ruined Blackwater fort destroyed by O'Neill in 1595. Later O'Neill's forces attacked Mountjoy's camp before withdrawing. In response, the Lord-Deputy sent his forces across the river where they found strong artificially fortified fords, which would have held out against the English.

By 15 July 1601, the Lord-Deputy had secured the surrender of O'Neill's ally Magennis. That month, Mountjoy had a new fort near the old Blackwater fort erected.

Mountjoy reported to the council in England that O'Neill was determined to prevent his forces from advancing into Tyrone and towards Dungannon. As such he initiated a policy of burning large quantities of corn to induce a famine to drive the rebels out of their strongholds.

Mountjoy set about trying to entice Hugh's forces to come out and attack by fetching some materials for the new fort from the Tyrone side of the river as well as burning more corn. Further skirmishes between Mountjoy and O'Neill's forces ensued during the summer of 1601.

Spanish forces had landed in Munster in August 1601, forcing Mountjoy to send his forces southwards leaving O'Neill remaining in his unbroken heartland of Tyrone. The Spanish arrival culminated in the Battle of Kinsale that December, which saw a major defeat of the rebels and their allies.

O'Neill during this time had also moved south to assist some of his allies, however, after some serious defeats at the hands of the forces of the Earl of Clanricarde of Connacht, he was in no place to offer any effective resistance once Mountjoy marched once more to Tyrone in the summer of 1602.

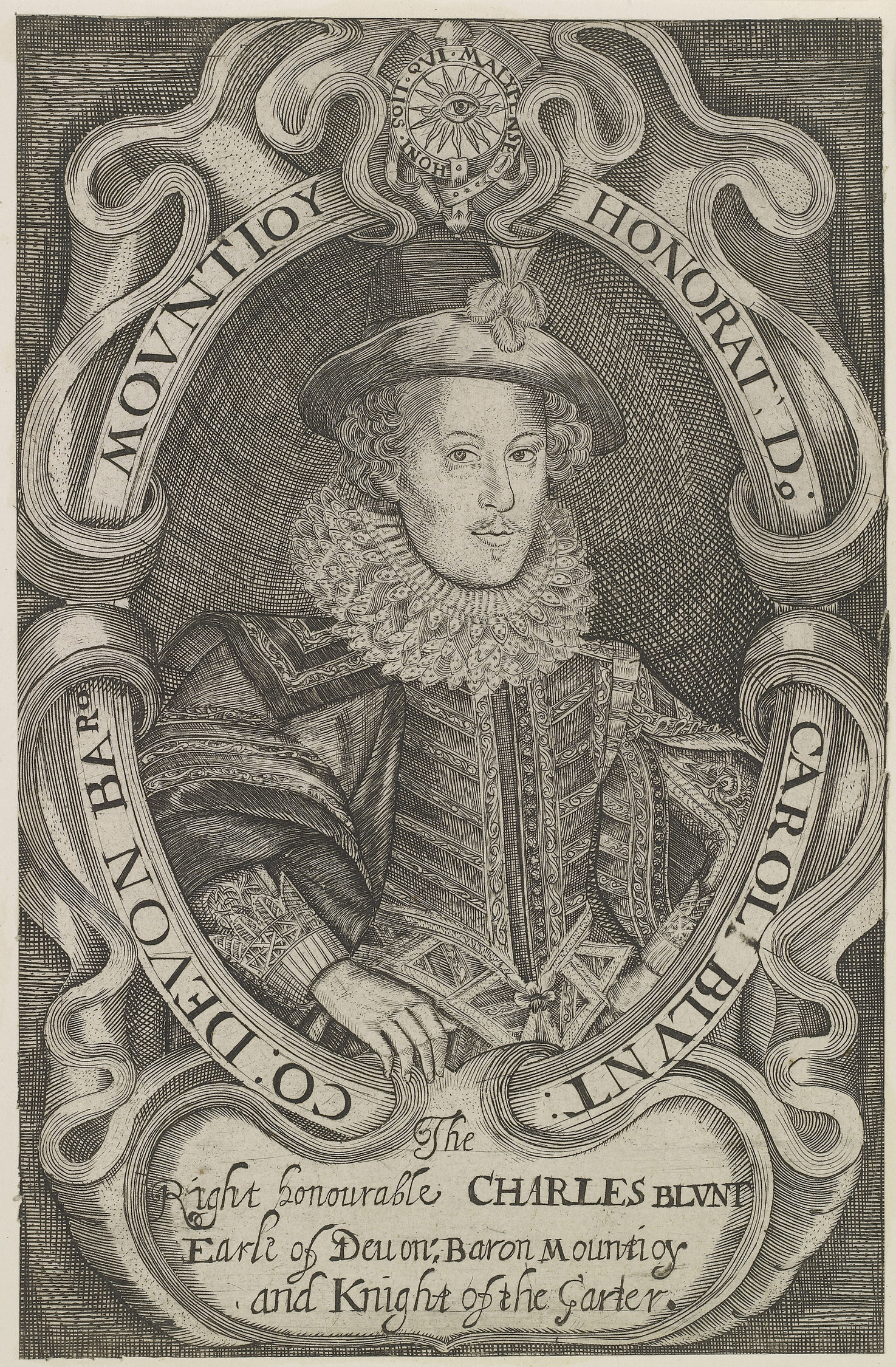
Engraving of Mountjoy, circa 1612-1616

Mountjoy advanced to the location he found the previous summer at the River Blackwater, which commanded safe and secure passage into Tyrone, previously inaccessible, and set about erecting a new fort. O'Neill having observed this burnt his capital at Dungannon and fled to his last refuge in Glenconkeyne.

Advancing northwards through Tyrone, Mountjoy erected a fort in the townland of Magheralamfield, afterwards known as Mountjoy Castle. He also christened the new fort at the Blackwater Charlemont Fort after himself.

Once in Tyrone, Mountjoy carried out a campaign of devastation throughout it resulting in the mass hunting of rebels, spoiling of corn, the burning of houses and the killing of churls so as to force the submission of O'Neill and his remaining allies. Most symbolically Mountjoy had the inauguration site of the O'Neill's at Tullyhogue Fort destroyed.

On 30 March 1603, six days after the death of Elizabeth and the accession of James I, O'Neill made peace with Mountjoy, signing the Treaty of Mellifont. Mountjoy continued in office with the more distinguished title of Lord-Lieutenant (1603–1604). He declared amnesty for the rebels and granted them honourable terms, which caused some severe criticism from England. He showed similar moderation in putting down the abortive risings in Cork, Waterford and Wexford, where the aldermen, apparently with some vague idea of gaining greater toleration for Roman Catholics, refused to proclaim the new King: in Cork, three insurgents were hanged after a summary trial, but the rest were acquitted or pardoned.

As part of the Plantation of Ulster, the majority of the barony of Loughinsholin was detached from County Tyrone and made part of the newly created County Londonderry. The rest of Loughinsholin along with the northern parts of Dungannon barony were merged to create the short-lived barony of Mountjoy. It would later be amalgamated with the barony of Dungannon.

== Later life ==
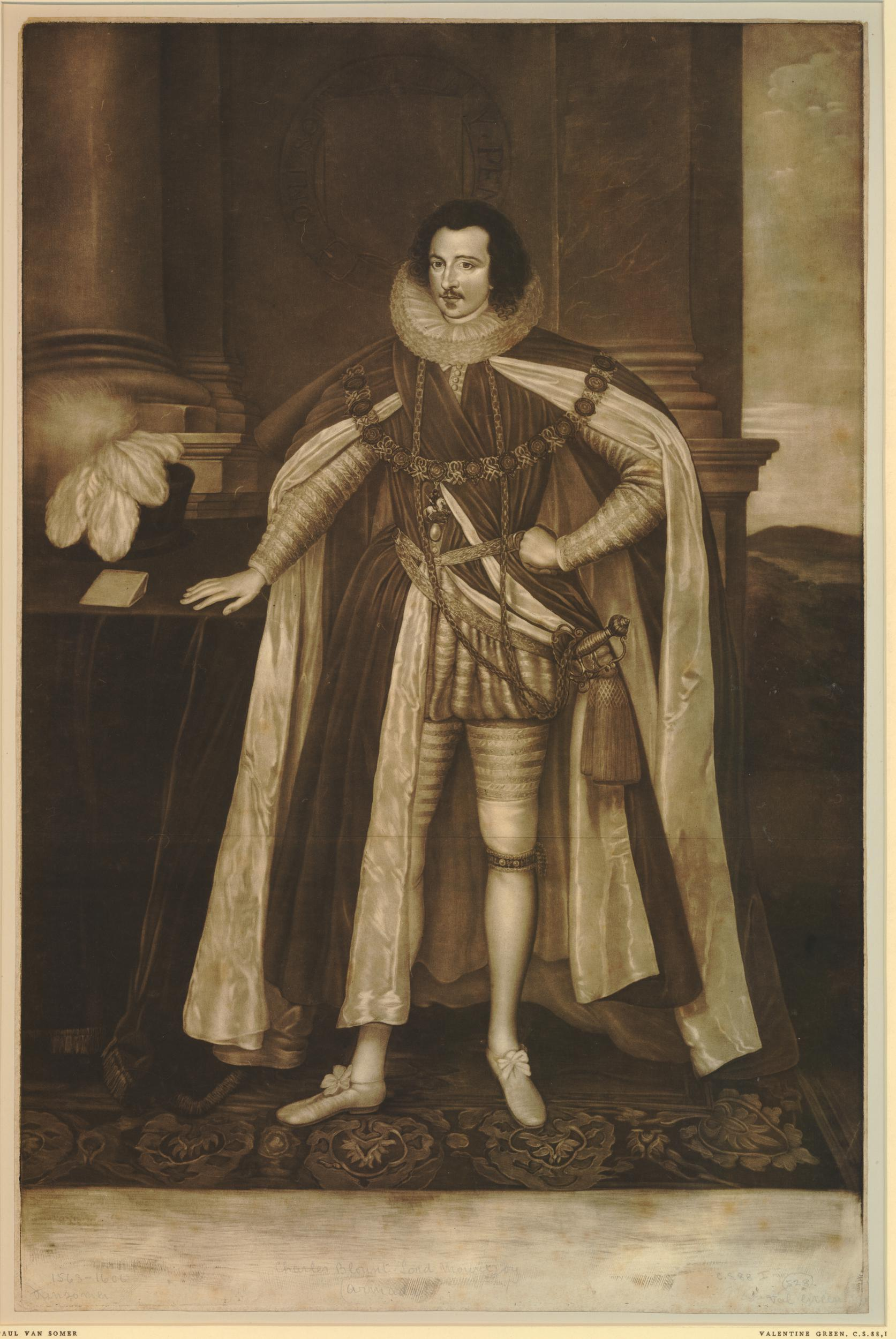
1775 print by Valentine Green, after a portrait by Paul van Somer I

On his return to England, Lord Mountjoy served as one of Sir Walter Raleigh's judges in 1603, and in the same year King James I appointed him Master of the Ordnance as well as creating him Earl of Devonshire, granting him extensive estates. He was one of the founder members of the Spanish Company re-founded by royal charter in 1605.

Mountjoy's long-term successor in Ireland was Sir Arthur Chichester. Ireland remained in a state of some tension, with a number of disgruntled Gaelic Irish allies of the Crown angered by Mountjoy's generous terms to the Earls of Tyrone and Tyrconnell which meant land that had been promised to them had now been restored to the earls.

In 1607, a year after Mountjoy's death, the flight of the Earls took place. The following year a former government ally Sir Cahir O'Doherty attacked and burned Derry, launching O'Doherty's Rebellion. The flight and the rebellion led to the Plantation of Ulster, something that had not been envisaged by Mountjoy when he had made peace in 1603.

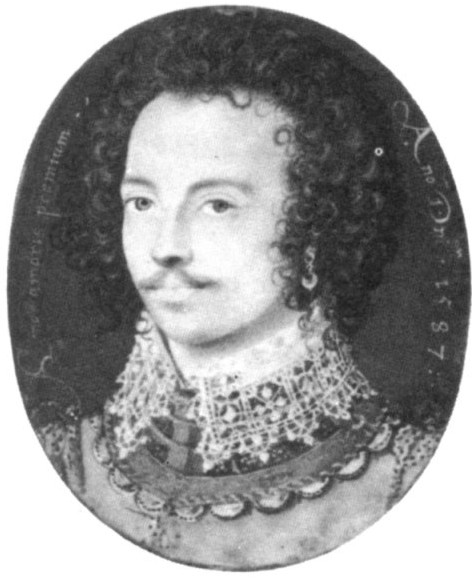
Portrait from before 1619

== Marriage ==
Towards the end of his life, on 26 December 1605 at Wanstead Hall near London, in a ceremony conducted by his chaplain William Laud, afterwards Archbishop of Canterbury, he married his long-time mistress Lady Penelope (died 7 July 1607), formerly wife of Robert, 3rd Baron Rich (later 1st Earl of Warwick) and sister of Robert Devereux, 2nd Earl of Essex.

After the execution of her brother in 1601, Lord Rich divorced her in the ecclesiastical courts. The marriage was carried out in defiance of canon law and resulted in the disgrace of both parties, who were banished from King James I's court circles. The Earl and Countess of Devonshire continued to live together as husband and wife with their illegitimate children until his death a few months later in the following year.

== Illegitimate progeny ==
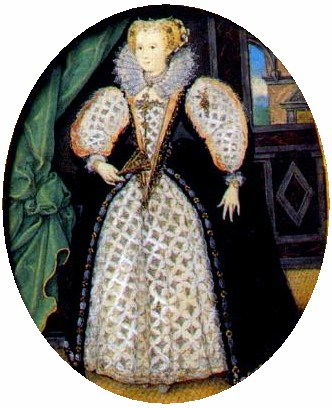
Nicholas Hilliard miniature thought to be of Penelope Rich

His illegitimate children by his mistress Lady Rich, of whom he acknowledged the paternity, included:

- Penelope Rich (1592–?) – baptised at St Clement Danes as ‘Penelope Riche ye daughter of ye H. Lord Riche’ on 30 March. 1592, despite her surname, she was a daughter of Penelope by Blount
- Mountjoy Blount, 1st Earl of Newport (1597–1666)
- Sir Saint John Blount – baptized at St Clement Danes with the name 'Scipio Rich', 8 December 1597. Saint John Blount, being described as the brother of Mountjoy, Lord Mountjoy, was made a Knight of the Bath on 1 February 1625 at the coronation of King Charles I, along with his nephew Robert Rich, son of his half brother the 2nd Earl of Warwick. His daughter Penelope (died probably before 1651) was the wife of Dr. Stephen Goffe.
- Isabella (Elizabeth) Blount (1595) - baptised at St Clement Danes as ‘Isabella Rich ye daughter of ye Lord Riche’ on 30 February 1594/5, despite her surname, she was a daughter of Penelope by Blount.
- Charles Blount (1605–1627)

== Legacy ==
Lord Devonshire left no legitimate children, and so his hereditary titles became extinct at his death from pneumonia on 3 April 1606 at Savoy House, London. His young contemporary, John Ford wrote one of his two earliest works, Fame's Memorial, as an elegy of 1169 lines on the recently deceased Charles Blount, 1st Earl of Devonshire. Ford has an acrostic – a series of lines whose first letters spell a word or name – in his prefatory dedication of the elegiac poem to Penelope Devereux, countess of Devonshire.

== Character ==
Fynes Moryson described Mountjoy's physical appearance: "He was of stature tall, and of very comely proportion, his skin faire, with little haire on his body, which haire was of colour blackish (or inclining to blacke) and thinne on his head, where he wore it short, except a locke under his left eare, which he nourished the time of this [Irish] warre, and being woven up, hid it in his necke, under his ruffe. ... His forehead was broad and high, his eyes great, black, and lovely, ... and his countenance cheerful. ... He was undoubtedly valiant and wise." Camden described Blount as "a person famous for conduct, and so eminent in courage and learning that in these respects he had no superior, and but few equals".

== Ancestry ==
Ancestors of Charles Blount, 8th Baron Mountjoy

8. William Blount, 4th Baron Mountjoy
4. Charles Blount, 5th Baron Mountjoy
9. Alice Keble
2. James Blount, 6th Baron Mountjoy
10. Robert Willoughby, 2nd Baron Willoughby de Broke
5. Ann Willoughby
11. Dorothy Grey
1. Charles Blount, 8th Baron Mountjoy
12. John Leigh
6. Thomas Leigh
3. Catherine Leigh
7. Joanna Cotton

== See also ==
- Baron Mountjoy
- Blount baronets

Political offices
Preceded by The Marquess of Winchester	Lord Lieutenant of Hampshire jointly with The Marquess of Winchester 1595–1598; The Lord Hunsdon 1597–1603; The Earl of Southampton 1604–1606; 1595–1606	Succeeded by The Earl of Southampton
Military offices
Vacant Title last held by The Earl of Essex	Master-General of the Ordnance; 1603–1606	Vacant Title next held by The Lord Carew
Political offices
Preceded by Lords Justices	Lord Deputy of Ireland; 1600–1603	Succeeded by Sir George Carey
Preceded by Lords Justices	Lord Lieutenant of Ireland; 1603–1604	Succeeded by Sir George Carey
Peerage of England
Preceded by William Blount	Baron Mountjoy; 1594–1606	Extinct
