= Bonaventura Vulcanius =

Flemish humanist

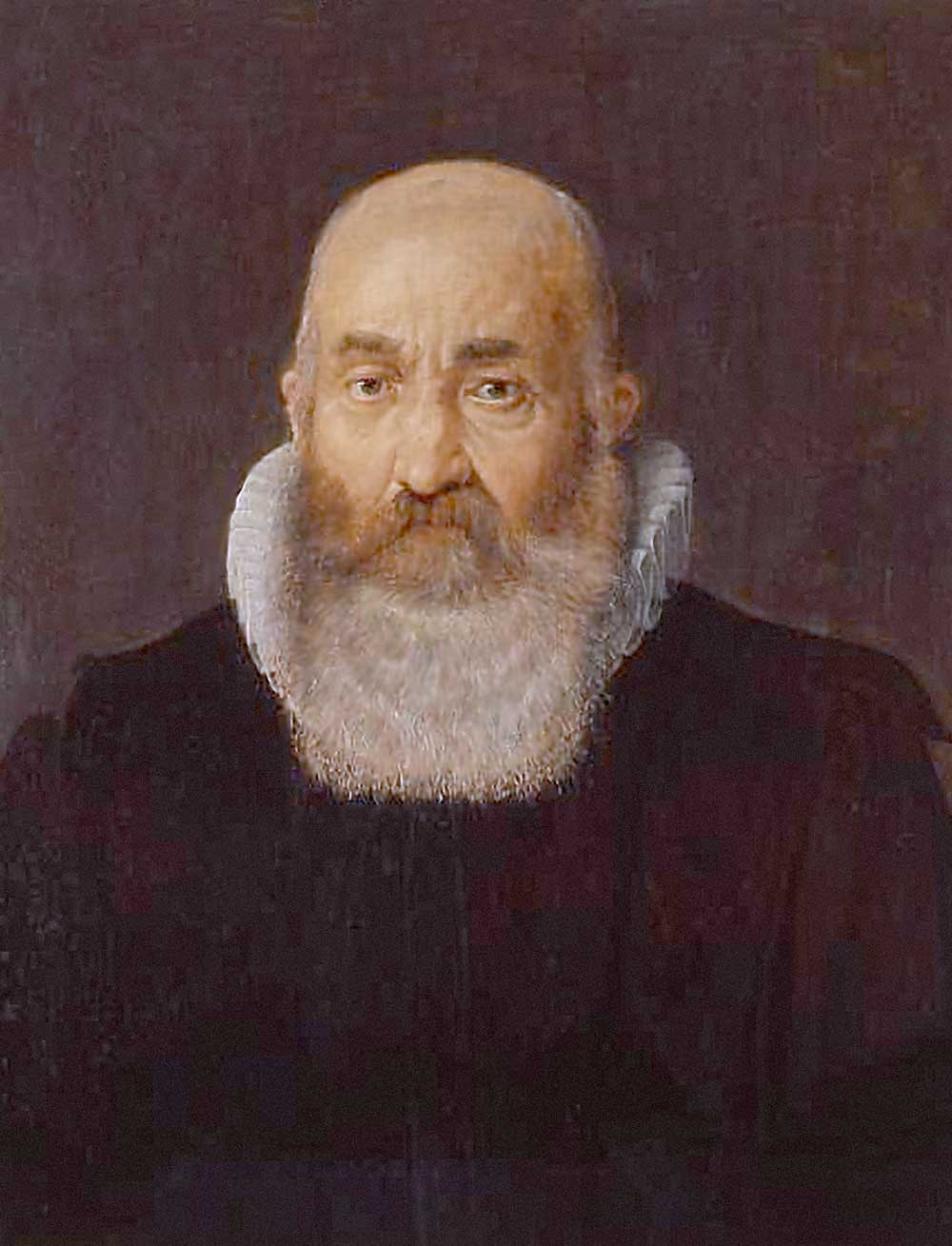
Portrait of Bonaventura Vulcanius in 1609

Bonaventura Vulcanius (30 June 1538, Bruges – 9 October 1614, Leiden) was a Flemish humanist who played a leading role in Northern humanism during the 16th and 17th century. He was a professor of Latin and Greek at Leiden University for 30 years and published various books in the Latin language. He was also a poet.

== Life ==
His father, Pieter de Smet, who was also known by the Latinized version of his name, Petrus Vulcanius ("the blacksmith"), was attorney-general of the Grand Council of Mechlin and counted Erasmus among his friends. He gave his son a thorough education, and Bonaventura studied first in Ghent, then for two years medicine at the University of Leuven, and finally philosophy and literature at Cologne with George Cassander.

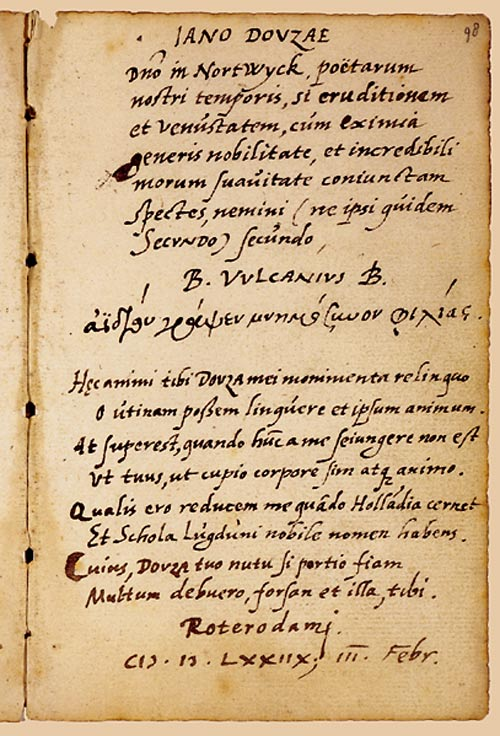
Text of a poem addressed by Vulcanius to Janus Dousa, founder of the Leiden University; written in Rotterdam, February 3, 1578

In 1559 he traveled to Spain to become the secretary to Francisco Mendoza de Bobadilla, bishop of Burgos, until the latter's death in 1566. He then became the secretary to the bishop's brother in Toledo until he died in 1570. Hereafter Vulcanius obtained a professorship of Greek in Cologne (though he never got to teach), then worked for the printer Henri Estienne in Geneva, and for the publisher Froben in Basel. In 1575, while in Geneva, he published (through Estienne) a scholarly edition of the Historia Alexandri of Arrian, incorporating a new Latin translation. In 1577 he returned to his native Flanders, and became secretary and family tutor of Marnix van Sint Aldegonde, diplomat, burgomaster of Antwerp and friend of William the Silent.

In 1578 he was appointed professor in Latin and Greek at Leiden University, where in 1581 he (finally) arrived and where for 30 years he 'taught the future elite of the Dutch Republic', among them Daniel Heinsius and Hugo Grotius.

Vulcanius had access to the silver-on-purple codex containing the surviving portion of the ancient Gothic translation of the Bible by Bishop Wulfila or Ulphilas. In 1597 he published the text, the first publication of a Gothic text altogether. He gave the manuscript the name by which it is still known, Codex Argenteus, from the Latin word for silver.

== Works ==
His written works include the De literis et lingua getarum, sive gothorum item de notis lombardicis, quibus accesserunt specimina variarum lingua, quarum indicem pagina quae praesationem sequitur ostendit of 1597.

== Sources ==
- Daniel Droixhe, La linguistique et l'appel de l'histoire. Rationalisme et révolutions positivistes, Genève, Droz, 1987.
