= Thomas Francis (English physician) =

English academic and physician

Thomas Francis (died 1574) was an English academic and physician, Provost of The Queen's College, Oxford, and President of the London College of Physicians.

== Life ==
A native of Chester, Francis was educated at Christ Church, Oxford, where he was admitted B.A. 19 June 1540, and M.A. 7 July 1544. According to Anthony Wood, he was acting as deputy to John Warner, the first Regius Professor of Physic at Oxford, by 1551, having had backing from Walter Wright to switch in 1550 from an unpromising theological career. He received the degree of M.B. and license to practise 9 March 1555, and commenced M.D. the following 29 July. At the beginning of 1555 he succeeded Warner in the regius professorship, which he resigned in 1561 to become Provost of The Queen's College. The Lewis Evans who graduated B.A. at Christ Church in 1554, a tutorial pupil of Francis, has been tentatively identified as Lewis Evans the Catholic controversialist of the later 1560s.

The appointment of Francis was not a popular one, and disturbances took place at his inauguration. He retired from the provostship in 1563. He was admitted a fellow of the College of Physicians, 21 October 1560, at the comitia specially convened for that purpose. He was censor in 1561 and the three following years. He was provisionally named elect 30 September 1562 in place of John Clement who had gone into exile, and was definitely appointed to the post 12 May 1564. He was President of the college in 1568, and consiliarius in 1571.

In June 1569 he was sent to treat the Earl of Shrewsbury who travelled in a litter from Chatsworth House to Wingfield Manor. Shrewsbury asked Francis to advise Mary, Queen of Scots on her health.

Francis was physician in ordinary to Queen Elizabeth. While President he took action against the unlicensed medical practitioner Eliseus Bomelius, whom he was obliged to prosecute for practising physic without a license from the college. Bomelius in letters to William Cecil offered to expose the ignorance of Francis in Latin and astronomy, but later apologised for having circulated false statements.

Francis lived in Silver Street, London, in the parish of St Olave Hart Street. He died in 1574.

== Notes ==
Attribution

This article incorporates text from a publication now in the public domain: Stephen, Leslie, ed. (1889). "Francis, Thomas". Dictionary of National Biography. Vol. 20. London: Smith, Elder & Co.
