= Henry Machyn =

English diarist

Henry Machyn (1496/1498 – 1563) was an English clothier and diarist in 16th-century London.

Machyn's Chronicle, which was written between 1550 and 1563, is primarily concerned with public events: changes on the throne, state visits, insurrections, executions and festivities. Machyn wrote his diary during a turbulent period in England: the Reformation, initiated by Henry VIII and carried through by Edward VI, was followed by the return to Catholicism (and burning of heretics) under Queen Mary I of England. Judging from his enthusiastic account of the disinterment of Edward the Confessor in 1557, Machyn was apparently a Catholic himself. The brief reign of Lady Jane Grey, and the dangers of speaking up for the losing side, are duly recorded. He circulated libellous information about the Protestant preacher John Véron, for which he made penance at Paul's Cross in November 1561. Machyn's diary comes to an end in 1563, in all likelihood because of his death.

Machyn sold funeral trappings, which explains why so much of his diary is concerned with minute accounts of funerals in London. Very little is known of the author; he is remarkably absent from his own diary. On only two occasions does he refer to his own age (56 in 1554, 66 in 1562). He was parish clerk of Holy Trinity the Less and made entries in the church register.

The (mis)spelling in this diary gives a rare insight into the pronunciation of the times. That is to say (since there was no strictly correct spelling at that time) that the spelling used in the manuscript, if it represents Machyn's speech accurately and consistently, provides an insight into one of the many and various patterns of English pronunciation of his time.
