= John Awdely =

British printer

John Awdely (fl. 24 August 1559 - 1577) was an English printer in London, known as a writer of popular and miscellaneous works.

== Life ==
Before 1559, he had become a freeman of the Stationers' Company; on 24 August of that year he presented an apprentice of his own, and on 6 November obtained licenses for printing his first publication, a 'morning and evenyng prayer.' From 1561 to 1571, his name occurs repeatedly in the Stationers' Registers as obtaining licenses for printing books and pamphlets, and as presenting apprentices. On several occasions he was fined for illegal printing of 'other men's copy,' and on 22 July 1561 a penalty of was imposed on him for unseemly words.' The last mention of him in the Stationers' Registers is under the year 1577, when with other printers he signed a petition to the queen against some monopolies in printing recently granted by her, and nothing is known of him after that date. He dwelt in Little Britain Street, described on his title-pages as 'without Aldersgate' or 'by Great S. Bartholomew's.'

== Works ==
Awdelay's publications were consisted mainly of ballads, news sheets, and religious tracts. One of the most important books reprinted and published by him was Anthony Fitzherbert's Boke of Husbandry. In 1561 he published translations by Henry Bennet from German reformers.

Many of his publications were of his own composition. One of the earliest of them was The Wonders of England, 1559, a folio sheet of eleven ten-line stanzas, relating to English historical events from the death of Edward VI to the accession of Elizabeth. Best known now is a little volume entitled The Fraternitye of Vacabondes, licensed about July 1561, and published by himself in 1565. It is an elaborate description of the habits and organisation of the beggars of the day. On the back of the title-page are some doggerel verses by the author. It was reprinted in 1565 and in 1575, and Thomas Harman's Caveat for Common Cursitors, a book on the same subject published in 1575, was indebted to it.

Awdely was strongly opposed to Catholicism, and wrote some verses to warn against its delusions, as a preface to A briefe Treatise agaynst certayn Errors of the Romish Church, by Gregory Scot, published by him in 1574. Other works were:

- Ecclesi. xx., Remember death and thou shalt never sinne, 30 April 1569 (sheet).
- Cruel Assault of God's Fort, in verse (sheet).
- Epitaphe upon Death of Mayster John Veron, preacher. Quod John Awdelay (fol. sheet), on John Véron.
- A Godly Ditty or Prayer to be song unto God for the preservation of his Church, our Queene and Realme, against all Traytours, Rebels, and Papistical Enemies, by John Awdelay, 1570 (broadside).

It is probable that the epitaphs of "Doctour Hodden" and "Masterr Fraunces Benyson", published by Awdely in 1570-1, were also written by him.

== Notes ==
Attribution

- This article incorporates text from a publication now in the public domain: "Awdelay, John (fl.1559-1577)". Dictionary of National Biography. London: Smith, Elder & Co. 1885–1900.
