= John Véron =

French protestant preacher

John Véron (died 1563) was a French Protestant controversialist and preacher, known for his activities in England. Véron also served as an English translator for the English Privy Council.

== Life ==
He styled himself "Senonensis", implying he was born at or near Sens and signed most of his work as "John Veron Senonoys." He studied at Orléans in 1534, and about 1536 settled in England: his letters of denization, dated 2 July 1544, stated that he had spent eight years in that country, that he had been a student at Cambridge (without graduating, apparently), and that he was, and intended to continue to be, a tutor.

In 1550, he had moved to Worcester. On 21 August 1551, he was ordained deacon by Nicholas Ridley at Fulham, and on 29 August he had received priest's orders. He was instituted on 3 January 1552 to the rectory of St Alphage, Cripplegate. He witnessed, or was in some way involved in, the uproar at Paul's Cross, which led on to the arrest of John Bradford on 16 August 1553; Véron was also committed to the Tower of London, both being styled seditious preachers. Ridley, writing to Bradford in 1554, inquired for Véron, who in 1554 was deprived of his benefice and remained a prisoner until Queen Elizabeth's accession.

On his release he became a preacher at Paul's Cross, was appointed prebendary of St Paul's Cathedral on 8 November 1559, rector of St Martin, Ludgate, on 8 March 1560, and vicar of St Sepulchre on 21 October 1560, preferments he held till his death. On 8 October 1559 he preached before the queen at Whitehall, when he urged that Protestant bishops should retain the old temporalities of their sees, so as to live in proper style. Aspersions were cast on his character, and on 2 November 1561 a man did penance at Paul's Cross for calumniating Véron, while on 23 November Henry Machyn had also publicly to apologise. John Strype describes him as a courageous and eloquent preacher.

On 1 March 1562 Véron certified to the Privy Council the accuracy of a translation of a French pamphlet against Catholicism that was being considered for publication in England. He died on 9 April 1563, and was buried in St. Paul's, oddly without a tombstone.

== Works ==
Most of his works were expressed in dialogue form. In 1548, he published a volume entitled "Certyne Litel Treaties set forth by J. V. for the erudition and learnyng of the symple and ignorant peopell", London. It included "The Five abominable Blasphemies contained in the Mass," an English translation of Heinrich Bullinger's treatise against the Anabaptists, "The Byble the Word of God," "No Humane Lymmes the Father hath," and "The Masse is an Idol." In 1550 he worked on Sir John Yorke "The godly Sayings of the ancient Fathers on the Sacrament" (Worcester; reprinted 1846). In addition, he had translated Huldrych Zwingli's "Short Pathway to the Understanding of the Scriptures", which was dedicated to Sir Arthur Darcy and Bullinger on "Infant Baptism". It should be said that "The Ymage of both Pastours" appeared at London in 1550. While in the tower, he published a translation of Bullinger's "Dialogue between a Libertine and a Christian".

At about 1560, Véron published "A moste necessary treatise of free wil not onlye against the Papists, but also against the Anabaptists" (London); and subsequently in 1561 "The Huntynge of Purgatorye to Death" (London), an adaptation of works of Pierre Viret dedicated to Francis Russell, 2nd Earl of Bedford, and "The Overthrow of the Justification of Works", dedicated to James Blount, 6th Baron Mountjoy. He was also the author of "A frutefull Treatise of Predestination... with an Apology of the same... whereunto are added... a very necessary boke against the free wyll men, and another of the true justification of faith and the good workes proceadynge of the same" (London, 1563?), dedicated to the queen; "A strong defence of the Marryage of Pryestes", and "A strong Battery against the Idolatrous Invocation of the dead Saintes" (London, 1562).

John Awdelay (fl. 1559–1577) wrote some verses to his memory, (Poetry of Reign of Elizabeth, Parker Soc. 1845). In 1575 Rodolphus Waddington published a "Latin-English Dictionary" for which Véron had left in a manuscript.

== Notes ==
Attribution

This article incorporates text from a publication now in the public domain: "Véron, John". Dictionary of National Biography. London: Smith, Elder & Co. 1885–1900.
