= Holy Trinity the Less =

Former church-site in London, England

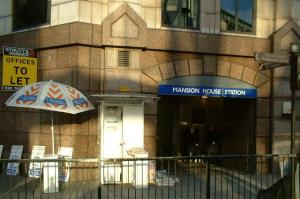
- Current photo of site
- Holy Trinity the Less
- 51°30′40″N 0°5′41″W
- Location: London
- Country: England
- Denomination: Anglican

History
- Founded: 11th century

Architecture
- Demolished: 1666

Holy Trinity the Less was a parish church in Knightrider Street in the City of London, destroyed in the Great Fire of London. Following the fire the site was used for a Lutheran church, which was eventually demolished in 1871 to make way for Mansion House underground station.

== Location ==
The church stood in Queenhithe ward, towards the eastern end of Knightrider Street, on the south side.

== History ==
The church was medieval in origin, and John Stow traced its roots back to 1266. John Rogers (who would later translate parts of the Bible editor and be martyred) was rector from 1532 to 1534. By 1606, it had fallen into a ruinous state and had to be propped up. It was subsequently demolished and rebuilt at the expense of the Merchant Taylor's and Vintner's Companies. The patronage of the church belonged to the Prior and convent of St Mary Overie, Southwark, until the Dissolution, after which it passed to the Crown and then to the Dean and Chapter of Canterbury Cathedral. The parish clerk in the 1550s, Henry Machyn, wrote a journal of London events.

Along with most of the other parish churches in the City, Holy Trinity was destroyed by the Great Fire of London in 1666. Four years later, a Rebuilding Act was passed and a committee set up under Sir Christopher Wren to decide which ones should be rebuilt. Holy Trinity the Less was not among the 51 chosen. Instead the parish was united with that of St Michael Queenhithe.

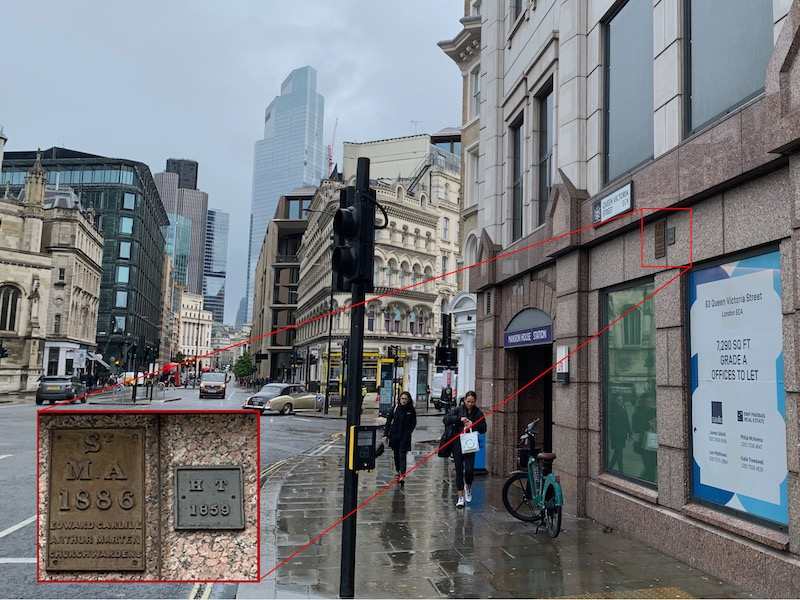
Parish boundary markers for Holy Trinity the Less & St Mary Aldermary

The site of the burnt-out Anglican church was used for a German Lutheran church, which opened in 1673. It survived until 1871 when it was closed and demolished to make way for the Mansion House underground station. The churchyard was cleared in 1872 to make room for the station.
