= Henry Bennet (translator) =

English translator

Henry Bennet (fl. 1561), said to be of Calais, was an English translator of Protestant literature.

Bennet published in 1561, at the press of John Awdely, a volume of translations from the German and Swiss Protestant reformers, A Famous and Godly History. The book is divided into two parts, which were published together.

The first part was dedicated to Thomas Wentworth, with a date of 18 November 1561. It contains Philip Melanchthon's life of Martin Luther; Luther's declaration of his doctrine before the Emperor Charles V at Worms; and the oration of Melanchthon at Wittenberg, given in place of his usual exposition of the Epistle to the Romans, after the news of Luther's death. Some of this part was adapted for Actes and Monuments (1563) by John Foxe.

The second part has a similar dedication to James Blount, dated 30 November 1561. It consists of:

- a life of John Œcolampadius by Wolfangus Faber Capito;
- an account of the death of Œcolampadius by Simon Grineus; and
- a life of Hulderick Zuinglius by Oswald Miconius

The last two are in the form of letters. The translations are in idiomatic English, and the quotations of Oecolampadius from Homer and Euripides are turned into English verse. The authors in the second part had first been brought together by Theodore Bibliander, though Bennet probably used the anonymous French compilation : Histoire des vies et faits de trois excellents personnages, premiers restaurateurs de l’évangile (1555).

== Notes ==
Attribution

This article incorporates text from a publication now in the public domain: Stephen, Leslie, ed. (1885). "Bennet, Henry (fl.1561)". Dictionary of National Biography. Vol. 4. London: Smith, Elder & Co.
