= Richard Whitford =

Richard Whitford (or Whytford) was a 16th century English (or Welsh) Catholic priest known as an author of many devotional works.

== Life ==
He obtained his name probably from Whitford, near Holywell, Flintshire where his uncle, Richard Whitford, possessed property. He studied at Oxford, but was elected a fellow of Queens' College, Cambridge, from 1495 to 1504. He was given leave of absence by his college for five years in 1496-7 that he might attend William Blount, 4th Baron Mountjoy, as chaplain and confessor, on the continent. At Paris he met and befriended Erasmus, Lord Mountjoy's tutor. In 1498 tutor, chaplain, and pupil returned to England; and perhaps at this time Whitford visited Oxford with Erasmus.

Soon afterwards he became chaplain to Richard Foxe, bishop of Winchester; and William Roper, in his Life of More, reports that in 1504 he encouraged Thomas More in his resistance to Henry VII's exactions. A speech against Foxe ascribed to Whitford may be apocryphal, but the closeness of his friendship with More is attested by a letter written from 'the country,' 1 May 1506, by Erasmus during his second visit to England. He sends Whitford a Latin declamation composed against the 'Pro Tyrannicida' of Lucian. This Whitford is to compare with a similar effort of More's, and to decide which is better. The letter contains an enthusiastic estimate of More's abilities. It states that Whitford used to affirm Erasmus and More to be 'so alike in wit, manners, affections, and pursuits, that no pair of twins could be found more so.'

Whitford, like his uncle, entered the Brigittine house at Isleworth, Middlesex, known as Syon Monastery (later as Syon House). Anthony Wood says the uncle gave large benefactions to the convent, which was a double one for nuns; and monks. The nephew is conjectured to have entered about 1507, at which time he composed his first devotional treatise by request of the abbess for the use of the nuns. The rest of his life was spent in the composition and compilation of similar works, which had a vogue beyond the convent walls. In 1530, Whitford produced a translation of "The Imitation of Christ" by Thomas à Kempis.

In 1535 Thomas Bedyll visited Syon to obtain from the monks and nuns an acknowledgment of the king's supremacy. His letters to Thomas Cromwell show that Whitford's firmness was conspicuous. He resisted Bedyll with constancy and courage. At the eventual dissolution of the monastery he obtained a pension and an asylum for the rest of his days in the London house of the Barons Mountjoy.

== Works ==
He was author of:

- 'A dayly exercyse and experyence of dethe, gathered and set forth, by a brother of Syon, Rycharde Whytforde. Imprinted by me John Waylande at London within the Temple barre, at the sygne of the blewe Garlande. An. 1537'. The preface states that this was written 'more than 20 yeres ago at the request of the reverende Mother Dame Elizabeth Gybs, whom Jesu perdon, the Abbes of Syon.' But this preface is undated. The original composition of it has been referred to about 1507.
- 'The Martiloge in Englyshhe after the use of the chirche of Salisbury, and as it is redde in Syon with addicyons,' printed by Wynkyn de Worde in 1526. The translator was Whitford, who gathered the additions 'out of the sanctiloge, legenda aurea, catalogo Sanctorum, the cronycles of Antonine, and of Saynt vincent and other dyvers auctours.' The book was reprinted and edited with introduction and notes by F. Procter and E. S. Bewick in 1893.
- 'Saynt Augustin's Rule in English alone,' Wynkyn de Worde, n.d. [1525]. The address by the translator to his 'good devout religious daughters' says that he was asked to amend the English version of their rule, but found it 'so scabrous rough or rude' that he has translated it 'of new.' It was printed again by Wynkyn de Worde as 'The rule of Saynt Augustine both in latyn and Englysshe, with two Exposycyons. And also the same rule agayn onely in Englysshe without latyn or Exposycyon.' The longer exposition is that of St. Hugh of Victor, the shorter is Whitford's. The book is dated 28 November 1525.
- 'A werke for Householders and for them that have the Gydyng or Governaunce of any Company,' printed by Wynkyn de Worde, 1530. This was reprinted with a slightly altered title in 1537 by John Wayland, and in 1538 by Robert Redman.
- 'The Four Revelations of St. Bridget,' London, 1531.
- 'The Golden Epistle of St. Bernard,' London, 1531. This was republished in 1537 and 1585 along with other treatises of Whitford.
- 'The Crossrune, or A B C. Here done followe two opuscules or small werks of Saynt Bonaventure, moche necessarie and profytable unto all Christians specyally unto religyous persons, put into Englyshe by a brother of Syon, Richard Whytforde. Alphabetum Religiosorum,' 1537, printed by Waylande before the previous work. It came out first in 1532.
- 'The Pomander of Prayer,' 1532, printed by Wynkyn de Worde.
- 'Here begynneth the boke called the Pype or Tonne, of the lyfe of perfection. The reason or cause whereof dothe playnly appere in the processe. Imprynted at london in Flete strete by me Robert Redman, dwellynge in Saynt 'Dunstones parysshe, next the Churche. In the yere of our lord god 1532, the 23 day of Marche,' 4to. This was a treatise against the Lutherans.
- 'A dialoge or Communicacion bytwene the curate or ghostly father and the parochiane or ghostly chyld. For a due preparacion unto howselynge,' followed by Nos. 7 and 6, printed by Waylande, 1537.
- 'A Treatise of Patience. Also a work of divers impediments and lets of Perfection,' London, 1540, (perhaps two works).
- 'An Instruction to avoid and eschew Vices,' London, 1541; translated with additions from St. Isidore.
- 'Of Detraction,' London, 1541; translated from St. Chrysostom.
- 'The following of Christ, translated out of Latin into English,' 1556, printed by Cawood; a second edition, 'newly corrected and amended,' appeared in 1585, printed probably at Rouen. The translation was founded upon that of the first three books of the De Imitatione made by Dr. William Atkinson at the request of the Countess of Richmond in 1504. It was edited with historical introduction by Dom Wilfrid Raynal, O.S.B., London, 1872.
- 'Certaine devout and Godly petitions commonly called Jesus Psalter. Cum Privilegio. Anno 1583.' It is conjectured that this popular book of devotion, known in modern times under the title of 'A Meditation Glorious named Jesus Psalter,' was Whitford's composition. In 1558-9 there is licensed to John Judson in the 'Stationers' Register' 'The Spirituall Counsaile, Jesus Mattens, Jesus Psalter, and xv Oes.' A manuscript in the library of Manresa House, Roehampton, seems to be the book entered in the 'Stationers' Register,' and is nearly identical with the work published in 1583. There is an earlier edition printed at Antwerp in 1575, and numerous later editions. The whole question of Whitford's authorship and the relation to each other of manuscript and editions is discussed in 'Jesu's Psalter. What it was at its origin and as consecrated by the use of many martyrs and confessors,' by the Rev. Samuel Heydon Sole, London, 1888. This prints the manuscript of 1571, the edition of 1583, and the modern version of the Psalter.
- A translation in the Bodleian Library of the 'Speculum B. Mariae—The Myrrour of Our Lady,' was almost certainly by Whitford. It was executed at the request of the abbess of Syon, and printed in 1530.

Certain 'Solitary Meditations' are also ascribed to Whitford by Thomas Tanner, without any date or comment.
