= James Blount, 6th Baron Mountjoy =

English peer (c.1533–1582)

James Blount, 6th Baron Mountjoy (c. 1533 – 1582) was an English peer.

== Life ==
Blount was born circa 1533 in Barnstaple, Devon, the eldest son of Charles Blount, 5th Baron Mountjoy (1516–1544) and Ann Willoughby. He inherited his title on the death of his father. He was made a Knight of the Bath at the coronation of Queen Mary (29 September 1553); and was Lord Lieutenant of Dorset in 1559.

He was one of the commissioners who tried the Duke of Norfolk in 1572, and spent the fortune of his family in the pursuit of alchemy. Lord Burghley encouraged him in the manufacture of alum and copperas between 1566 and 1572.

Blount also had a reputation as a supporter of Protestantism, in line with that of his father and grandfather. Henry Bennet lauded him in 1561, mentioning also his patronage of Eliseus Bomelius, and the same year Jean Veron dedicated to him an anti-papal tract.

== Family ==
On 17 May 1558, he married Catherine Leigh, daughter of Thomas Leigh of Durham St. Oswalds, Yorkshire. They had five children: William, Charles, Christopher, Ann, and Edward.

On his death on 10 October 1582, in Hook (near Okehampton), the title passed to his eldest son William Blount, 7th Baron Mountjoy.

Peerage of England
Preceded by Edward Blount	Baron Mountjoy; 1544–1582	Succeeded by William Blount
