= Brent Deklerck =

Belgian trampoline gymnast (born 2006)

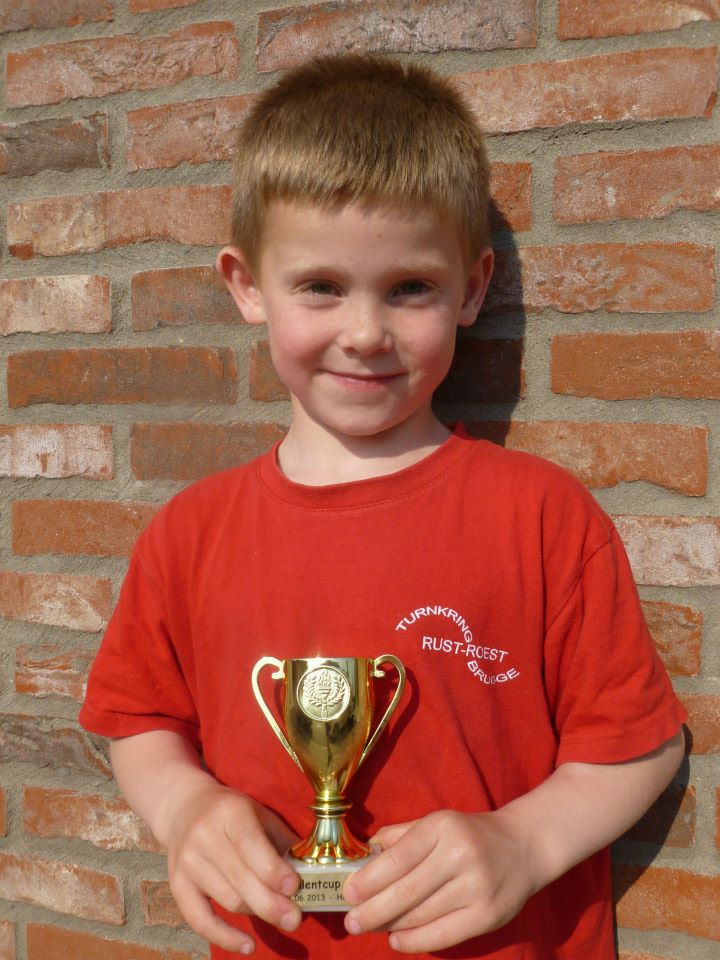
- Brent Deklerck in 2013

Personal information
- Born: 26 December 2006 (age 19) Bruges, Belgium

Gymnastics career
- Discipline: Trampoline gymnastics
- Country represented: Belgium
- Club: WIK Oostende, Rust Roest Brugge
Medal record
Men's trampoline gymnastics
Representing Belgium
World Games
Gold medal – first place	2025 Chengdu	Double Mini
European Championships
Bronze medal – third place	2024 Guimarães	Double Mini
FIG World Cup
Event	1st	2nd	3rd
Synchro	0	0	1
Double Mini	0	0	1
Total	0	0	2
World Age Group Competitions
Gold medal – first place	Baku 2021	Double Mini
European Junior Championships
Gold medal – first place	2022 Rimini	Double Mini Team
Silver medal – second place	2022 Rimini	Double Mini
Silver medal – second place	2021 Sochi	Double Mini

Brent Deklerck (born 26 December 2006) is a Belgian athlete who competes in trampoline gymnastics. He has won four medals at the European Trampoline Championships.
