= Charles Blount, 5th Baron Mountjoy =

English courtier (1516–1544)

Charles Blount, 5th Baron Mountjoy (28 June 1516 – 10 October 1544), was an English courtier and patron of learning.

== Life ==
Charles Blount was born on 28 June 1516 in Tournai, where his father, William Blount, 4th Baron Mountjoy, was governor. His mother was William's second wife, Alice, daughter of Henry Keble, Lord Mayor of London.

In 1522, Jan van der Cruyce, a graduate of the University at Leuven and a friend of Erasmus, travelled to England to become a private tutor to Mountjoy's children. He remained in the household until 1527, when he returned to Leuven and was appointed a professor of Greek. Possibly on the recommendation of Erasmus, van der Cruyce was succeeded by Petrus Vulcanius of Bruges, also a graduate of Leuven, who remained in England until 1531. In 1531 Erasmus praised Blount for his fine written style, but after Vulcanius's departure realized that the credit should have gone to the preceptor rather than the student.

John Palsgrave, who composed L'esclarcissement de la langue francoyse (printed in 1530 and dedicated to Henry VIII) and was tutor to Henry Fitzroy, also gave tuition to the sons of several court noblemen, Blount among them. One of his fellow schoolmates in this group was Lord Thomas Howard, son of the second Duke of Norfolk, whose own tutor at Lambeth had been John Leland. Leland in turn praised Charles's skill in Latin and presented a book along with commendatory verses to him.

In 1523 Juan Luis Vives wrote a short educational treatise dedicated to Charles, De ratione studii puerilis ad Carolum Montioium Guilielmi filium. This served as a parallel to the tract on female education Vives had composed in the same year for the benefit of Mary Tudor. Erasmus added Charles's name to that of his father in the dedication to the 1528 edition of the Adagia and Charles was the dedicatee of the next two editions (1533, 1536) as well. Erasmus also dedicated his 1531 edition of Livy to him.

About August 1530 Charles Blount married his stepsister Anne, daughter of Robert Willoughby, 2nd Baron Willoughby de Broke. Her mother was Dorothy, daughter of Thomas Grey, 1st Marquess of Dorset, who had become the fourth wife of Charles's father.

Succeeding to the title after his father's death in 1534, Mountjoy was regular in his attendance in the House of Lords. In May 1537 he was one of the peers summoned for the trial of lords Darcy and Hussey and he was also on the panel of 3 December 1538 for the trial of Henry Pole, 1st Baron Montagu, and Henry Courtenay, Marquess of Exeter, his own brother-in-law. His country house was at Apethorpe, Northamptonshire, and in London, he lived in Silver Street.

After the dissolution of Syon Abbey in 1539 Mountjoy granted asylum at his London house to the pious, learned, and outspokenly conservative priest Richard Whitford, who had been patronized by his father. Whitford remained in the household until his death in 1542 and may have acted as tutor to Mountjoy's children. Like his father, Mountjoy was deeply interested in the humanist educational programme and he tried to engage the learned scholar and educationist Roger Ascham, then teaching at Cambridge, as a tutor to his eldest son and secretary to himself. Although Ascham did not take the position—and he also refused a similar offer from Margaret Roper—he admired Mountjoy and referred in flattering terms to his learning, likening his household for its patronage of learning to that of the Medici.

Mountjoy was granted Yeaveley Preceptory in Derbyshire, by Henry VIII, following the dissolution.

Mountjoy drew up his will on 30 April 1544, just before embarking for France with the Expeditionary forces. In it, he admonished his children to "kepe themselfes worthye of so moche honour as to be called hereafter to dye for there maister and countrey" (PRO, PROB 11/30, fol. 343). He also composed his own epitaph in English verse. After being present with Henry VIII at the siege of Boulogne, he died on 10 October 1544 at Hooke, Dorset (formerly the home of his mother), probably from an illness contracted on campaign. In his will, he reckoned his assets, in money, goods, and debts owed to him, at nearly £2,100. Among other bequests, he left 40 marks to provide lectures for the children of Westbury-under-the-Plain, Wiltshire, for the succeeding two years. He was buried at St Mary Aldermary in the City of London. His widow remarried and lived until 1582.

== Notes ==
Peerage of England
Preceded by William Blount	Baron Mountjoy; 1534–1544	Succeeded by James Blount
