= Pieter Aspe =

Belgian writer (1953–2021)

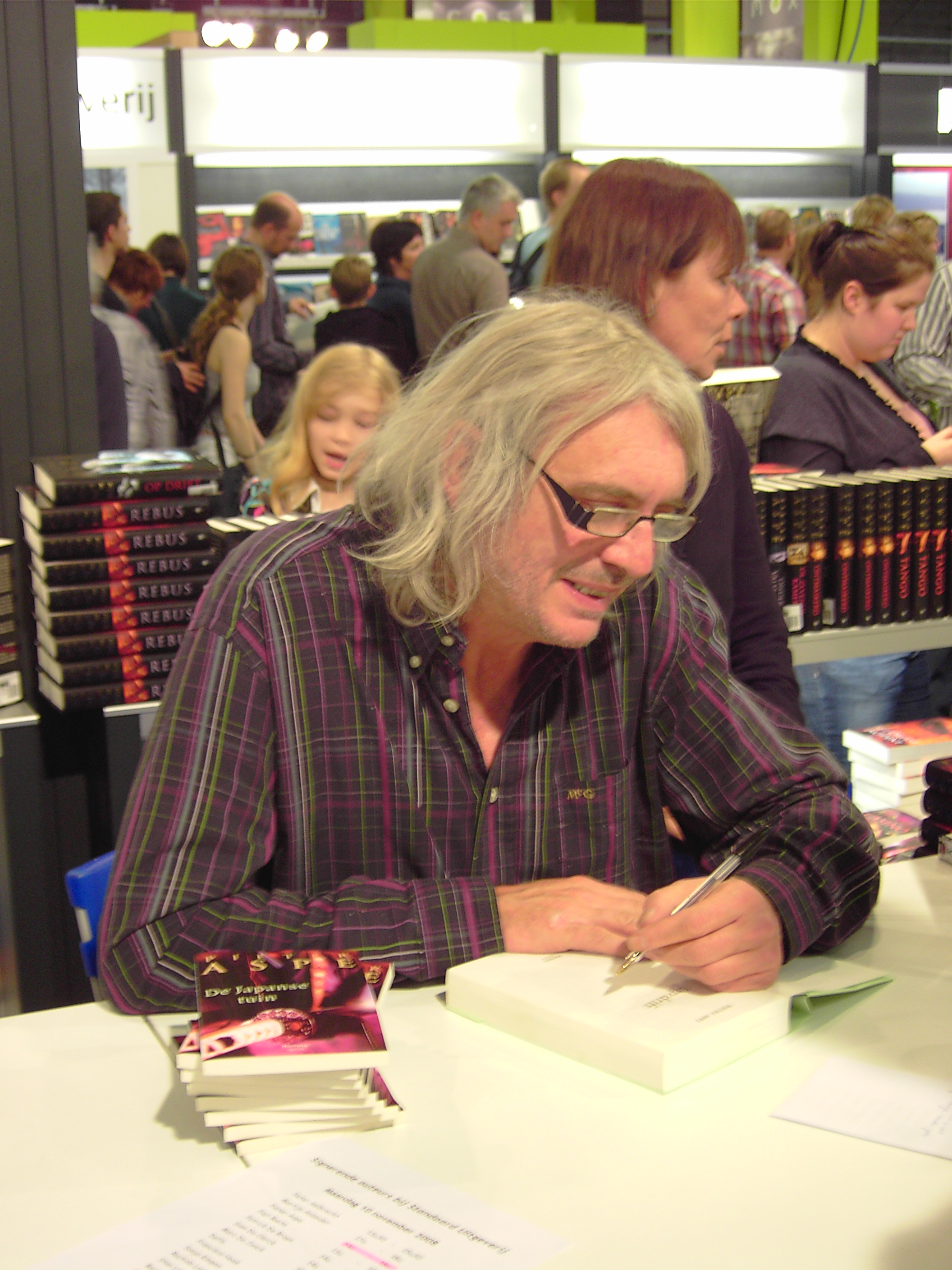
- Born: Pierre Aspeslag; 3 April 1953; Bruges, Belgium
- Died: 1 May 2021 (aged 68)
- Occupation: Writer
- Writing career
- Pen name: Pieter Aspe
- Genre: Crime fiction

Pieter Aspe (officially Pierre Aspeslag; 3 April 1953 – 1 May 2021) was a Belgian writer of a series of detective stories starring Inspector Pieter Van In. These were adapted for the long-running TV series Aspe (2004–14) starring Herbert Flack. He died at the age of 68.

== Bibliography ==
=== Novels ===
From 2000 on Aspe published two books annually.

No.	Title	Translation	Year	ISBN	
1.	Het Vierkant van de Wraak	The Square of Revenge	1995	90-223-1354-9, 978-1605984469	
2.	De Midasmoorden	The Midas Murders	1996	90-223-1406-5, 978-1605984872	
3.	De Kinderen van Chronos	The Children of Chronos	1997	90-223-1437-5	
4.	De Vierde Gestalte	The Fourth Figure	1998	90-609-1414-7	
5.	Het Dreyse-incident	The Dreyse Incident	1999	90-6091-422-8	
6.	Blauw Bloed	Blue Blood	2000	90-223-1728-5	
7.	Dood Tij	Dead Tide	2000	90-223-1573-8	
8.	Zoenoffer	Sweet Sacrifice	2001	90-5542-827-2, 90-223-1575-4	
9.	Vagevuur	Purgatory	2001	90-223-1602-5	
10.	De Vijfde Macht	The Fifth Power	2002	90-223-1732-3	
11.	Onder Valse Vlag	Under False Flag	2002	90-223-1774-9	
12.	13	Thirteen	2003	90-223-1789-7	
13.	Pandora	Pandora	2003	90-223-1788-9	
14.	Tango	Tango	2004	90-223-1831-1	
15.	Onvoltooid Verleden	Unfinished Past	2004	90-223-1941-5	
16.	Casino	Casino	2005	90-223-1884-2	
17.	Ontmaskerd	Unmasked	2005	90-223-1941-5	
18.	Zonder Spijt	Without Regret	2006	90-223-1965-2	
19.	Alibi	Alibi	2006	90-223-1967-9	
20.	Rebus	Rebus	2007	978-90-223-2143-0	
21.	Op Drift	Adrift	2007	978-90-223-2146-1	
22.	De Zevende Kamer	The Seventh Room	2008	978-90-223-2246-8	
23.	Bankroet	Bankrupt	2008	978-90-223-2249-9	
24.	Misleid	Misguided	2009	978-90-223-2354-0	
25.	De Cel	The Cell	2009	978-90-223-2355-7	
26.	De Vijand	The Enemy	2010	978-90-223-2483-7	
27.	Erewoord	Parole	2010	978-90-223-2485-1	
28.	Postscriptum	Postscript	2011	978-90-223-2607-7	
29.	Solo	Solo	2011	978-90-223-2615-2	
30.	Eiland	Island	2012	978-90-223-2702-9	
31.	Min Een	Minus One	2012	978-90-223-2789-0	
32.	Het Laatste Bevel	The Last Command	2013	978-90-223-2825-5	
33.	Het Janussyndroom	Janus Syndrome	2013	978-99-032-4617-3	
34.	(Pijn)³	(Pain)³	2014	978-90-223-2965-8	
35.	Zonder voorschrift	Without a Prescription	2014	978-99-032-4683-8	
36.	De Doos	The Box	2015	978-90-223-3108-8	
37.	Het oor van Malchus	The Ear of Malchus	2015		
38.	Import		2016	978-99-032-4802-3	
39.	Exit		2016		
40.	de butler knop	2017	41	Blankenberge Blues	2017

Note: book 41 'Blankenberge Blues' written with co-author Johan Strobbe

Note: ISBNs with 978-99-032... are taken from the second edition of the book (published in general 3 years after the first edition)

=== Other books ===
1. Grof wild (1998)
2. De Japanse Tuin
3. Kat en Muis
4. De Laatste Rit
5. De Oxymorontheorie (2015)
  Books for youngsters (youth)
  - Bloedband
  - Luchtpost

== See also ==
- Flemish literature
