= Johannes Vasaeus =

Jan Was or Waes, Latinized Johannes Vasaeus (1511 – 21 October 1561) was a Flemish humanist, teacher and historian, who spent his working life in Spain and Portugal.

== Life ==
Vasaeus was born in Bruges in 1511. At the age of twenty, while he was still studying at the Collegium Trilingue in Leuven, he met Ferdinand Columbus, the second son of Christopher Columbus, who persuaded him to accompany him to Spain. Here he became the first librarian of Ferdinand's personal library (later known as La Colombina), a collection dedicated to the discoveries and voyages of Christopher Columbus. When Ferdinand died in 1539, the library, consisting of around 10,000 volumes, was given to Seville Cathedral, and Vasaeus' contract was terminated.

He then became head of a school in Braga, and in 1541 taught in the University of Évora, both in Portugal.

In 1550 he became a teacher and lecturer in Salamanca, where he died.

His substantial works on the history of Spain appeared posthumously.

== Works ==
- Rerum Hispaniae memorabilium, Cologne, 1577.
