= George Cassander =

Flemish Catholic theologian and humanist

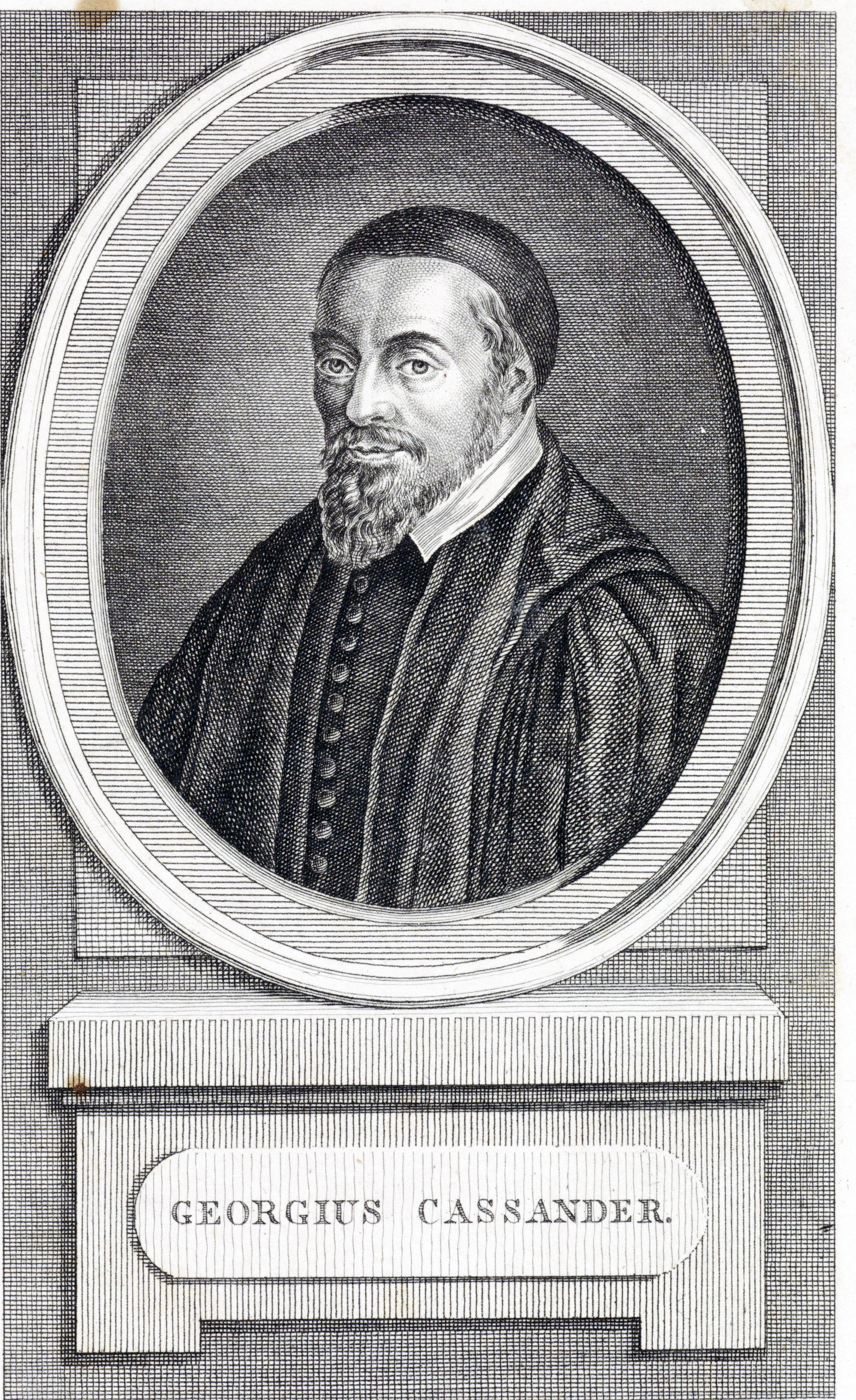
George Cassander

George Cassander (or Cassant) (1513 – 3 February 1566) was a Flemish Catholic theologian and humanist.

== Life ==
Born at Pittem near Bruges, he went at an early age to Leuven, where he graduated in 1533. In 1541 he was appointed professor of belles-lettres at Bruges, but resigned two years later, partly from a natural desire to travel for instruction, and partly in consequence of the opposition aroused by his pro-Reformation views.

On his journeys, which were undertaken in the company, and at the expense of his friend, Cornelius Wouters, he visited Rome, and in 1544 came to Cologne, where he settled permanently in the summer of 1549. He soon abandoned the classics for the study of the Bible and ecclesiastical questions, and had already published several classical, Biblical, and patristic treatises, when in 1556 he commenced a series of liturgical works. After a profound study of the points of difference between the Catholic and reformed churches, he devoted himself to the project of reunion, thus anticipating the efforts of Gottfried Leibniz.

Jacques Auguste de Thou described Cassander as "...modest, void of arrogance; and he was as ardent in his wishes for a religious union, and made as many concessions for the accomplishment for this object, as could be expected from a person who continued in the Catholic communion."

He died at Cologne on 3 February 1566. The collected edition of his works was published in 1616 at Paris.

== Works ==
Cassander's activity in promoting religious peace between Catholics and Protestants began in 1561 with the publication of his anonymous book: De officio pii viri in hoc religionis dissidio. This work, written at the request of the jurist, François Baudouin, and submitted by him to the Colloquy of Poissy (Sept., 1561), gave offence to both sides. While holding that no one, on account of abuses, has a right utterly to subvert the Church, Cassander does not disguise his dislike of those who exaggerated the papal claims. He takes his standpoint on Scripture explained by tradition and the fathers of the first six centuries. He did not expect full reconciliation but proposed that Churches agree on "the elements of Apostolic doctrine".

At a time when controversy drowned the voice of reason, such a book pleased neither party; but as some of the German princes thought that he could heal the breach, the emperor Ferdinand asked him to publish his Consultatio de Articulis Fidei inter Catholicos et Protestantes Controversis (1565), in which, like Newman at a later date, he tried to put a Catholic interpretation upon the Augsburg Confession. Cassander proposed basing belief on Scripture as interpreted by the Fathers of the first six centuries where necessary in the case of doubtful texts.

In 1564, Cassander went to Duisburg at the Emperor's request to address the question of infant baptism and the Anabaptists.

While never attacking dogma, and even favoring the Roman church on the ground of authority, he criticizes the papal power and makes reflections on practices. The work, attacked violently by the Leuven theologians on one side, and by Calvin and Beza on the other, was put on the Roman Index in 1617.

== Bibliography ==
- Peter Arnold Heuser, Jean Matal. Humanistischer Jurist und europäischer Friedensdenker (um 1517-1597), Köln; Weimar; Wien: Böhlau, 2003 ISBN 3-412-06003-8.
- Peter Arnold Heuser, « Netzwerke des Humanismus im Rheinland: Georgius Cassander (1513-1566) und der jülich-klevische Territorienverbund », dans Guido von Büren, Ralf-Peter Fuchs und Georg Mölich (eds.): Herrschaft, Hof und Humanismus. Wilhelm V. von Jülich-Kleve-Berg und seine Zeit (Schriftenreihe der Niederrhein-Akademie, 11), Bielefeld: Verlag für Regionalgeschichte, ^{2}2020 (^{1}2018), pp. 501-530.
- Rob van de Schoor, « The Reception of Cassander in the Republic in the Seventeenth Century », in C. Berkvens-Stevelinck, J. Israel et G. H. M. Posthumus Meyjes (dir.), The Emergence of Tolerance in the Dutch Republic, Leyde, E. J. Brill, 1997, p. 101-115.
- Rob van de Schoor, Guillaume H. M. Posthumus Meijes (eds.): Georgius Cassander’s ‘De officio pii viri’ (1561): Critical edition with contemporary French and German translations, Berlin – Boston 2016 (Arbeiten zur Kirchengeschichte, 134).
