= November 2011 in sports =

<<	November 2011					>>
Su	Mo	Tu	We	Th	Fr	Sa
		1	2	3	4	5
6	7	8	9	10	11	12
13	14	15	16	17	18	19
20	21	22	23	24	25	26
27	28	29	30
Sports

This list shows notable sports-related deaths, events, and notable outcomes that occurred in November of 2011.

== Deaths in November ==
- 4: Matty Alou
- 7: Joe Frazier
- 19: Basil D'Oliveira
- 25: Vasily Alekseyev
- 27: Gary Speed

== Current sporting seasons ==
=== American football 2011 ===
- National Football League
- NCAA Division I FBS
- NCAA Division I FCS

=== Auto racing 2011 ===
- Formula One
- Sprint Cup
- Nationwide Series
- Camping World Truck Series
- World Rally Championship
- WTCC
- V8 Supercar
- GP2 Series
- FIA GT1 World Championship
- Super GT

=== Baseball 2011 ===
- Nippon Professional Baseball

=== Basketball 2011 ===
- NCAA Division I men
- NCAA Division I women
- Euroleague
- EuroLeague Women
- Eurocup
- EuroChallenge
- Australia
- France
- Germany
- Greece
- Israel
- Italy
- Philippines
  - Philippine Cup
- Russia
- Spain
- Turkey

=== Canadian football 2011 ===
- Canadian Football League
- CIS football

=== Cricket 2011 ===
- Australia:
  - Sheffield Shield
  - Ryobi One-Day Cup

=== Football (soccer) 2011 ===
National teams competitions

- 2014 FIFA World Cup qualification
- UEFA Euro 2012 qualifying
- UEFA Women's Euro 2013 qualifying

International clubs competitions

- UEFA (Europe) Champions League
- UEFA Europa League
- UEFA Women's Champions League
- Copa Sudamericana
- AFC (Asia) Champions League
- CAF (Africa) Champions League
- CAF Confederation Cup
- CONCACAF (North & Central America) Champions League
- OFC (Oceania) Champions League

Domestic (national) competitions

- Argentina
- Australia
- Brazil
- England
- France
- Germany
- Iran
- Italy
- Japan
- Norway
- Portugal
- Russia
- Scotland
- Spain
- Major League Soccer (USA & Canada)
  - MLS Cup Playoffs

=== Golf 2011 ===
- PGA Tour
- European Tour
- LPGA Tour
- Champions Tour

=== Ice hockey 2011 ===
- National Hockey League
- Kontinental Hockey League
- Czech Extraliga
- Elitserien
- Canadian Hockey League:
  - OHL, QMJHL, WHL
- NCAA Division I men
- NCAA Division I women

=== Motorcycle racing 2011 ===
- Moto GP

=== Rugby league 2011 ===
- Four Nations
- Autumn International Series

=== Rugby union 2011 ===
- Heineken Cup
- Amlin Challenge Cup
- Aviva Premiership
- RaboDirect Pro12
- Top 14
- LV= Cup
- Sevens World Series

=== Snooker 2011 ===
- Players Tour Championship

=== Tennis 2011 ===
- ATP World Tour
- WTA Tour

=== Volleyball 2011 ===
International clubs competitions

- Men's CEV Champions League
- Women's CEV Champions League

=== Winter sports ===
- Alpine Skiing World Cup
- Biathlon World Cup
- Cross-Country Skiing World Cup
- ISU Grand Prix
- ISU Junior Grand Prix
- Luge World Cup
- Nordic Combined World Cup
- Short Track Speed Skating World Cup
- Ski Jumping World Cup
- Snowboard World Cup
- Speed Skating World Cup

== Days of the month ==
=== November 30, 2011 (Wednesday) ===
==== Baseball ====
- Nippon Professional Baseball awards:
  - Rookies of the Year:
    - Central League: Hirokazu Sawamura, Yomiuri Giants
    - Pacific League: Kazuhisa Makita, Saitama Seibu Lions

==== Basketball ====
- Euroleague Regular Season Matchday 7 (teams in **bold** qualify for Top 16):
  - Group A: Gescrap Bizkaia (Spain) 97–76 (France) SLUC Nancy
    - Standings: (Spain) Caja Laboral 4–2, (Greece) Olympiacos, (Italy) Bennet Cantù, (Turkey) Fenerbahçe Ülker 3–3, Gescrap Bizkaia, SLUC Nancy 3–4.
  - Group B:
    - Žalgiris (Lithuania) 67–65 (Spain) Unicaja
    - Brose Baskets (Germany) 78–81 (Russia) **CSKA Moscow**
    - **Panathinaikos** (Greece) 94–76 (Croatia) KK Zagreb
      - Standings: CSKA Moscow 7–0, Panathinaikos 5–2, Unicaja 3–4, Brose Baskets, Žalgiris, KK Zagreb 2–5.
  - Group C: Spirou Charleroi (Belgium) 62–66 (Turkey) Anadolu Efes
    - Standings: (Israel) Maccabi Tel Aviv 5–1, (Spain) Real Madrid 4–2, Anadolu Efes 4–3, (Serbia) Partizan Mt:s Belgrade 3–3, (Italy) EA7 Emporio Armani 2–4, Spirou Charleroi 1–6.

==== Biathlon ====
- World Cup 1 in Östersund, Sweden:
  - Men's 20 km Individual: (gold) Martin Fourcade (FRA) 53:29.8 (0+0+0+1) (silver) Michal Šlesingr (CZE) 55:24.1 (0+1+0+0) (bronze) Simon Schempp (GER) 55:24.3 (1+0+0+0)

==== Football (soccer) ====
- CAF U-23 Championship in Morocco:
  - Group B in Marrakech:
    - Gabon 1–1 South Africa
    - Ivory Coast 1–0 Egypt
      - Standings (after 2 matches): Côte d'Ivoire 4 points, Egypt 3, South Africa 2, Gabon 1.
- UEFA Europa League group stage Matchday 5 (teams in **bold** qualify for Round of 32):
  - Group A:
    - Rubin Kazan (Russia) 4–1 (Republic of Ireland) Shamrock Rovers
    - Tottenham Hotspur (England) 1–2 (Greece) **P.A.O.K.**
      - Standings (after 5 matches): P.A.O.K. 11 points, Rubin Kazan 10, Tottenham Hotspur 7, Shamrock Rovers 0.
  - Group B:
    - **Standard Liège** (Belgium) 2–0 (Germany) **Hannover 96**
    - Vorskla Poltava (Ukraine) 1–1 (Denmark) Copenhagen
      - Standings (after 5 matches): Standard Liège 11 points, Hannover 96 8, Copenhagen 5, Vorskla Poltava 2.
  - Group C:
    - Rapid București (Romania) 1–3 (Israel) Hapoel Tel Aviv
    - **Legia Warsaw** (Poland) 0–3 (Netherlands) **PSV Eindhoven**
      - Standings (after 5 matches): PSV Eindhoven 13 points, Legia Warsaw 9, Hapoel Tel Aviv 4, Rapid București 3.
  - Group G:
    - Malmö FF (Sweden) 0–0 (Netherlands) AZ
    - **Metalist Kharkiv** (Ukraine) 4–1 Austria Wien
      - Standings (after 5 matches): Metalist Kharkiv 13 points, Arizona 7, Austria Wien 5, Malmö FF 1.
  - Group H:
    - Maribor (Slovenia) 3–4 (Belgium) Club Brugge
    - **Braga** (Portugal) 1–0 (England) Birmingham City
      - Standings (after 5 matches): Club Brugge, Braga 10 points, Birmingham City 7, Maribor 1.
  - Group I:
    - Rennes (France) 0–0 (Italy) Udinese
    - Celtic (Scotland) 0–1 (Spain) **Atlético Madrid**
      - Standings (after 5 matches): Atlético Madrid 10 points, Udinese 8, Celtic 5, Rennes 3.
- Copa Sudamericana Semifinals second leg (first leg score in parentheses): **Universidad de Chile** 2–0 (1–1) (Brazil) Vasco da Gama. Universidad de Chile win 4–1 on points.

==== Snooker ====
- Players Tour Championship – Event 10 in Sheffield, England:
  - Final: **Michael Holt** (ENG) 4–2 Dominic Dale (WAL)
    - Holt wins his second professional title.
    - Order of Merit (after 10 of 12 events): (1) Ronnie O'Sullivan (ENG) 29,600 (2) Judd Trump (ENG) 28,900 (3) Neil Robertson (AUS) 28,100

=== November 29, 2011 (Tuesday) ===
==== Baseball ====
- Asia Series Final in Taichung, Taiwan: (South Korea) **Samsung Lions** 5, (Japan) Fukuoka SoftBank Hawks 3.
  - The Lions become the first non-Japanese champion. Lions starting pitcher Jang Won-Sam is named series MVP.

==== Cricket ====
- West Indies in India:
  - 1st ODI in Cuttack: West Indies 211/9 (50 overs); India 213/9 (48.5 overs). **India win by 1 wicket, lead 5-match series 1–0.**
- Pakistan in Bangladesh:
  - Only T20I in Mirpur: Pakistan 135/7 (20 overs); Bangladesh 85/9 (20 overs). **Pakistan win by 50 runs.**

==== Football (soccer) ====
- CAF U-23 Championship in Morocco:
  - Group A in Tangiers:
    - Morocco 1–0 Algeria
    - Senegal 2–1 Nigeria
      - Standings (after 2 matches): Morocco 6 points, Senegal, Algeria 3, Nigeria 0.
- Copa Sudamericana Semifinals second leg (first leg score in parentheses): Vélez Sársfield (Argentina) 0–1 (0–2) (Ecuador) **LDU Quito**. LDU Quito win 6–0 on points.

==== Snooker ====
- Ricky Walden compiles the 81st official maximum break at the Players Tour Championship – Event 10.

==== Volleyball ====
- FIVB Men's World Cup in Japan, Matchday 8:
  - Poland 3–0 Egypt
  - Iran 0–3 China
  - Japan 0–3 United States
  - Cuba 1–3 Russia
  - Argentina 1–3 Italy
  - Serbia 3–1 Brazil
    - Standings (after 8 matches): Poland 22 points, Russia 21, Italy 17, Brazil 16, Cuba 14, Iran, United States 12, Argentina 9, Japan 8, Serbia 6, China 4, Egypt 3.

=== November 28, 2011 (Monday) ===
==== Volleyball ====
- FIVB Men's World Cup in Japan, Matchday 7:
  - Iran 3–0 Egypt
  - Poland 3–0 United States
  - Japan 3–0 China
  - Argentina 0–3 Russia
  - Cuba 3–2 Brazil
  - Serbia 1–3 Italy
    - Standings (after 7 matches): Poland 19 points, Russia 18, Brazil 16, Italy, Cuba 14, Iran 12, United States, Argentina 9, Japan 8, Serbia, Egypt 3, China 1.

=== November 27, 2011 (Sunday) ===
==== Alpine skiing ====
- Men's World Cup in Lake Louise, Canada:
  - Super Giant slalom: (gold) Aksel Lund Svindal (NOR) 1:23.47 (silver) Didier Cuche (SUI) 1:23.70 (bronze) Adrien Théaux (FRA) 1:24.11
    - Overall standings (after 3 of 45 races): (1) Cuche 180 points (2) Svindal 140 (3) Ted Ligety (USA) & Théaux 100
- Women's World Cup in Aspen, United States:
  - Slalom: (gold) Marlies Schild (AUT) 1:43.72 (51.24, 52.48) (silver) Maria Pietilä Holmner (SWE) 1:44.91 (52.07, 52.84) (bronze) Maria Höfl-Riesch (GER) 1:45.68 (52.27, 53.41)
    - Overall standings (after 3 of 40 races): (1) Viktoria Rebensburg (GER) 180 points (2) Elisabeth Görgl (AUT) 140 (3) Pietilä Holmner 125

==== Auto racing ====
- Formula One:
  - Brazilian Grand Prix in São Paulo, Brazil: (1) Mark Webber (AUS) (Red Bull–Renault) (2) Sebastian Vettel (GER) (Red Bull-Renault) (3) Jenson Button (GBR) (McLaren–Mercedes)
    - Final drivers' championship standings: (1) Vettel 392 points (2) Button 270 (3) Webber 258

==== Badminton ====
- BWF Super Series:
  - China Open Super Series Premier in Shanghai (CHN unless stated):
    - Men's singles: **Lin Dan** def. Chen Long 21–17, 26–24
    - Women's singles: **Wang Yihan** def. Wang Xin 18–12 retired
    - Men's doubles: **Mathias Boe**/**Carsten Mogensen** (DEN) def. Ko Sung-hyun/Yoo Yeon-seong (KOR) 21–17, 21–13
    - Women's doubles: **Wang Xiaoli**/**Yu Yang** def. Tang Jinhua/Xia Huan 21–11, 21–10
    - Mixed doubles: **Zhang Nan**/**Zhao Yunlei** def. Joachim Fischer Nielsen/Christinna Pedersen (DEN) 21–11, 21–14

==== Baseball ====
- Asia Series in Taiwan (teams in **bold** qualify for Final):
  - (Japan) **Fukuoka SoftBank Hawks** 4, (Australia) Perth Heat 0
  - (South Korea) **Samsung Lions** 6, (Taiwan) Uni-President 7-Eleven Lions 3
    - Final standings: Fukuoka SoftBank Hawks 3–0, Samsung Lions 2–1, Uni-President 7-Eleven Lions 1–2, Perth Heat 0–3.

==== Canadian football ====
- CFL Playoffs:
  - Grey Cup in Vancouver, British Columbia: **BC Lions** 34, Winnipeg Blue Bombers 23
    - The Lions win the Cup for the sixth time.

==== Cross-country skiing ====
- World Cup in Kuusamo, Finland:
  - Men's 15 km C Handicap Start: (gold) Alexey Poltoranin (KAZ) 37:42.8 (silver) Eldar Rønning (NOR) 37:51.5 (bronze) Daniel Richardsson (SWE) 38:11.3
    - Final Nordic Opening standings: (gold) Petter Northug (NOR) 1:03:05.1 (silver) Dario Cologna (SUI) 1:03:06.9 (bronze) Rønning 1:03:25.7
    - Distance standings (after 3 of 22 races): (1) Johan Olsson (SWE) 169 points (2) Northug 140 (3) Roland Clara (ITA) 109
    - Overall standings (after 5 of 38 races): (1) Northug 355 points (2) Cologna 278 (3) Olsson 259
  - Women's 10 km C Handicap Start (all NOR): (gold) Therese Johaug 27:51.4 (silver) Marit Bjørgen 28:00.1 (bronze) Vibeke Skofterud 28:16.4
    - Final Nordic Opening standings: (gold) Bjørgen 41:36.6 (silver) Johaug 42:09.6 (bronze) Skofterud 42:10.3
    - Distance standings (after 3 of 22 races): (1) Bjørgen 196 points (2) Charlotte Kalla (SWE) 156 (3) Skofterud 146
    - Overall standings (after 5 of 38 races): (1) Bjørgen 446 points (2) Johaug 316 (3) Skofterud 309

==== Football (soccer) ====
- CAF U-23 Championship in Morocco:
  - Group B in Marrakech:
    - Egypt 1–0 Gabon
    - South Africa 1–1 Ivory Coast
- 2012 Olympics Men's Asian qualifiers preliminary round 3, Matchday 3:
  - Group A:
    - South Korea 1–0 Saudi Arabia
    - Oman 1–1 Qatar
      - Standings (after 3 matches): South Korea 7 points, Oman 4, Qatar 3, Saudi Arabia 1.
  - Group B:
    - Australia 0–0 Uzbekistan
    - United Arab Emirates 0–2 Iraq
      - Standings (after 3 matches): Uzbekistan 5 points, Iraq 4, Australia 3, United Arab Emirates 2.
  - Group C:
    - Japan 2–1 Syria
    - Malaysia 2–3 Bahrain
      - Standings (after 3 matches): Japan 9 points, Syria 6, Bahrain 3, Malaysia 0.

==== Golf ====
- Omega Mission Hills World Cup in Haikou, China:
  - Winners: United States (Matt Kuchar, Gary Woodland) 264 (−24)
    - The United States win the Cup for the 24th time.
- European Tour:
  - South African Open in Ekurhuleni, South Africa:
    - Winner: Hennie Otto (RSA) 274 (−14)
      - Otto wins his second European Tour title.

==== Luge ====
- World Cup 1 in Igls, Austria:
  - Men's singles: (gold) Felix Loch (GER) 1:40.270 (50.145, 50.125) (silver) David Möller (GER) 1:40.573 (50.244, 50.329) (bronze) Armin Zöggeler (ITA) 1:40.627 (50.305, 50.322)
  - Team relay: (gold) Canada (Alex Gough, Samuel Edney, Tristan Walker/Justin Snith) 2:08.774 (41.302, 43.575, 43.897) (silver) Germany (Tatjana Hüfner, Andi Langenhan, Tobias Arlt/Tobias Wendl) 2:08.991 (41.190, 43.695, 44.106) (bronze) Russia (Tatiana Ivanova, Albert Demtschenko, Vladislav Yuzhakov/Vladimir Makhnutin) 2:09.427 (41.575, 43.920, 43.932)

==== Ski jumping ====
- Men's World Cup in Kuusamo, Finland:
  - HS 142 Team: (gold) Austria (Wolfgang Loitzl, Andreas Kofler, Gregor Schlierenzauer, Thomas Morgenstern) 517.2 points (silver) Japan (Junshiro Kobayashi, Shōhei Tochimoto, Taku Takeuchi, Daiki Ito) 408.4 (bronze) Russia (Dimitry Vassiliev, Anton Kalinitschenko, Roman Sergeevich Trofimov, Denis Kornilov) 398.3
  - HS 142: (gold) Kofler 264.2 points (silver) Schlierenzauer 263.5 (bronze) Morgenstern 256.3

==== Speed skating ====
- World Cup 2 in Astana, Kazakhstan:
  - Men's 1000m: (gold) Stefan Groothuis (NED) 1:08.85 (silver) Kjeld Nuis (NED) 1:08.92 (bronze) Mo Tae-Bum (KOR) 1:09.29
    - Standings (after 2 of 6 races): (1) Groothuis 200 points (2) Nuis 160 (3) Denny Morrison (CAN) 120
  - Men's mass start: (gold) Lee Seung-Hoon (KOR) 9:40.51 (silver) Jonathan Kuck (USA) 9:40.67 (bronze) Joo Hyung-Joon (KOR) 9:40.81
  - Women's 1000m: (gold) Christine Nesbitt (CAN) 1:14.82 (silver) Thijsje Oenema (NED) 1:16.12(0) (bronze) Margot Boer (NED) 1:16.12(7)
    - Standings (after 2 of 6 races): (1) Nesbitt 200 points (2) Boer 150 (3) Marrit Leenstra (NED) 130
  - Women's mass start: (gold) Mariska Huisman (NED) 7:26.53 (silver) Claudia Pechstein (GER) 7:26.61 (bronze) Kim Bo-Reum (KOR) 7:26.85

==== Snooker ====
- David Gray compiles the 80th official maximum break at the Players Tour Championship – Event 10 and becomes the 13th person to compile more than one.

==== Tennis ====
- ATP World Tour:
  - ATP World Tour Finals in London, England:
    - Final: **Roger Federer** (SUI) def. Jo-Wilfried Tsonga (FRA) 6–3, 6–7(6), 6–3
      - Federer wins the year-end championships for a record sixth time. He wins his fourth title of the year, and in his 100th career final, his 70th title.

==== Volleyball ====
- FIVB Men's World Cup in Japan, Matchday 6:
  - Iran 0–3 United States
  - Poland 3–1 China
  - Japan 3–1 Egypt
  - Serbia 0–3 Russia
  - Argentina 0–3 Brazil
  - Cuba 3–1 Italy
    - Standings (after 6 matches): Poland 16 points, Russia, Brazil 15, Cuba 12, Italy 11, Iran, United States, Argentina 9, Japan 5, Serbia, Egypt 3, China 1.

=== November 26, 2011 (Saturday) ===
==== Alpine skiing ====
- Men's World Cup in Lake Louise, Canada:
  - Downhill: (gold) Didier Cuche (SUI) 1:47.28 (silver) Beat Feuz (SUI) 1:47.34 (bronze) Hannes Reichelt (AUT) 1:47.36
    - Overall standings (after 2 of 45 races): (1) Cuche & Ted Ligety (USA) 100 points (3) Feuz & Alexis Pinturault (FRA) 80
- Women's World Cup in Aspen, United States:
  - Giant slalom: (gold) Viktoria Rebensburg (GER) 2:11.25 (1:05.41, 1:05.84) (silver) Elisabeth Görgl (AUT) 2:11.58 (1:04.46, 1:07.12) (bronze) Julia Mancuso (USA) 2:11.69 (1:05.37, 1:06.32)
    - Giant slalom standings (after 2 of 9 races) & Overall standings (after 2 of 40 races): (1) Rebensburg 180 points (2) Görgl 140 (3) Lindsey Vonn (USA) 122

==== Baseball ====
- Asia Series in Taiwan:
  - (Japan) Fukuoka SoftBank Hawks 9, (South Korea) Samsung Lions 0
  - (Taiwan) Uni-President 7-Eleven Lions 3, (Australia) Perth Heat 2 (F/10)
    - Standings: Fukuoka SoftBank Hawks 2–0, Samsung Lions, Uni-President 7-Eleven Lions 1–1, Perth Heat 0–2.

==== Cricket ====
- West Indies in India:
  - 3rd Test in Mumbai, day 5: West Indies 590 & 134 (57.2 overs; Pragyan Ojha 6/47); India 482 & 242/9 (64 overs). **Match drawn; India win 3-match series 2–0.**
    - The match becomes the second in Test history to end in a draw with the scores level.

==== Cross-country skiing ====
- World Cup in Kuusamo, Finland:
  - Men's 10 km F Individual: (gold) Petter Northug (NOR) 24:23.6 (silver) Dario Cologna (SUI) 24:35.4 (bronze) Alexander Legkov (RUS) 25:05.0
    - Distance standings (after 2 of 22 races): (1) Johan Olsson (SWE) 132 points (2) Northug 130 (3) Roland Clara (ITA) 106
    - Overall standings (after 3 of 38 races): (1) Northug 145 points (2) Olsson 132 (3) Clara 106
  - Women's 5 km F Individual: (gold) Marit Bjørgen (NOR) 13:36.5 (silver) Vibeke Skofterud (NOR) 13:53.9 (bronze) Charlotte Kalla (SWE) 13:56.6
    - Distance standings (after 2 of 22 races): (1) Bjørgen 150 points (2) Kalla 126 (3) Skofterud 103
    - Overall standings (after 3 of 38 races): (1) Bjørgen 200 points (2) Kalla 172 (3) Skofterud 146

==== Curling ====
- Pacific-Asia Championships in Nanjing, China:
  - Men:
    - Bronze Final: Australia 2–9 (bronze) **South Korea**
    - Final: (gold) **China** 5–2 (silver) New Zealand
      - China win the title for the fifth time.
  - Women:
    - Bronze Final: (bronze) **New Zealand** 8–4 Japan
    - Final: (silver) South Korea 3–11 (gold) **China**
      - China win the title for the fifth time in six years.

==== Equestrianism ====
- Show jumping – Global Champions Tour:
  - 10th Competition in Abu Dhabi, United Arab Emirates (CSI 5*): (gold) Roger-Yves Bost (FRA) on Ideal de la Loge (silver) Khaled Al-Eid (KSA) on Presley Boy (bronze) Álvaro de Miranda Neto (BRA) on Ashleigh Drossel Dan
    - Final standings: (1) Edwina Tops-Alexander (AUS) 238 points (2) Ludger Beerbaum (GER) 218.5 (3) de Miranda Neto 210

==== Figure skating ====
- ISU Grand Prix:
  - Rostelecom Cup in Moscow, Russia (skaters in **bold** qualify for Final):
    - Ladies: (gold) **Mao Asada** (JPN) 183.25 points (silver) **Alena Leonova** (RUS) 180.45 (bronze) Adelina Sotnikova (RUS) 169.75
      - Final standings: **Elizaveta Tuktamysheva** (RUS) 30 points, Asada, **Carolina Kostner** (ITA) & **Akiko Suzuki** (JPN) 28, **Alissa Czisny** (USA) 26, Leonova 24.
    - Pairs: (gold) **Aliona Savchenko**/**Robin Szolkowy** (GER) 208.69 points (silver) **Yuko Kavaguti**/**Alexander Smirnov** (RUS) 197.84 (bronze) Stefania Berton/Ondřej Hotárek (ITA) 168.02
      - Final standings: **Tatiana Volosozhar**/**Maxim Trankov** (RUS), Savchenko/Szolkowy & Kavaguti/Smirnov 30 points, **Zhang Dan**/**Zhang Hao** (CHN) 26, **Narumi Takahashi**/**Mervin Tran** (JPN), **Meagan Duhamel**/**Eric Radford** (CAN) & Kirsten Moore-Towers/Dylan Moscovitch (CAN) 22.
    - Men: (gold) **Yuzuru Hanyu** (JPN) 241.66 points (silver) **Javier Fernández** (ESP) 241.63 (bronze) **Jeremy Abbott** (USA) 229.08
      - Final standings: **Patrick Chan** (CAN) 30 points, **Daisuke Takahashi** (JPN), Abbott, **Michal Březina** (CZE) & Fernández 26, Hanyu, Song Nan (CHN) & Takahiko Kozuka (JPN) 24.
    - Ice dance: (gold) **Meryl Davis**/**Charlie White** (USA) 179.06 points (silver) **Kaitlyn Weaver**/**Andrew Poje** (CAN) 161.18 (bronze) **Ekaterina Bobrova**/**Dmitri Soloviev** (RUS) 156.83
      - Final standings: Davis/White & **Tessa Virtue**/**Scott Moir** (CAN) 30 points, **Maia Shibutani**/**Alex Shibutani** (USA) 28, Bobrova/Soloviev, **Nathalie Péchalat**/**Fabian Bourzat** (FRA) & Weaver/Poje 26.

==== Football (soccer) ====
- FIFA World Cup qualification – OFC first round in Apia, Samoa (team in **bold** qualify for the Second round):
  - **Samoa** 1–0 American Samoa
  - Tonga 2–1 Cook Islands
    - Final standings: Samoa 7 points, Tonga, American Samoa 4, Cook Islands 1.
- CAF U-23 Championship in Morocco:
  - Group A in Tangiers:
    - Nigeria 0–1 Morocco
    - Algeria 1–0 Senegal

==== Luge ====
- World Cup 1 in Igls, Austria:
  - Women's singles: (gold) Tatjana Hüfner (GER) 1:19.353 (39.717, 39.636) (silver) Anke Wischnewski (GER) 1:19.554 (39.735, 39.819) (bronze) Alex Gough (CAN) 1:19.628 (39.861, 39.767)
  - Doubles: (gold) Peter Penz/Georg Fischler (AUT) 1:19.099 (39.486, 39.613) (silver) Vladislav Yuzhakov/Vladimir Makhnutin (RUS) 1:19.175 (39.543, 39.632) (bronze) Andreas Linger/Wolfgang Linger (AUT) 1:19.187 (39.664, 39.523)

==== Nordic combined ====
- World Cup in Kuusamo, Finland:
  - HS 142 / 10 km: (gold) Tino Edelmann (GER) 27:37.3 (silver) Janne Ryynänen (FIN) 27:45.3 (bronze) Akito Watabe (JPN) 27:49.5
    - Standings (after 2 of 23 races): (1) Edelmann 160 points (2) Magnus Krog (NOR) & Watabe 140

==== Rugby union ====
- IRB Sevens World Series:
  - Gold Coast Sevens in Gold Coast, Australia:
    - Shield: Japan 19–31 **Papua New Guinea**
    - Bowl: **Argentina** 17–14 Scotland
    - Plate: Samoa 15–26 **Wales**
    - Cup: New Zealand 12–26 **Fiji**
- End of year tests in London: Barbarians 11–60 Australia

==== Ski jumping ====
- Men's World Cup in Kuusamo, Finland:
  - HS 142 Team: Postponed to November 27 due to strong winds.

==== Speed skating ====
- World Cup 2 in Astana, Kazakhstan:
  - Men's 500m: (gold) Jan Smeekens (NED) 35.05 (silver) Mo Tae-Bum (KOR) 35.06 (bronze) Tucker Fredricks (USA) 35.19
    - Standings (after 4 of 12 races): (1) Mo 285 points (2) Smeekens 246 (3) Joji Kato (JPN) 213
  - Men's 5000m: (gold) Sven Kramer (NED) 6:13.83 (silver) Jorrit Bergsma (NED) 6:15.40 (bronze) Alexis Contin (FRA) 6:17.43
    - Standings (after 2 of 6 races): (1) Kramer & Bergsma 180 points (3) Contin 120
  - Women's 500m: (gold) Jenny Wolf (GER) 37.98(4) (silver) Lee Sang-Hwa (KOR) 37.98(5) (bronze) Nao Kodaira (JPN) 37.99
    - Standings (after 4 of 12 races): (1) Lee 310 points (2) Wolf 290 (3) Thijsje Oenema (NED) 250
  - Women's 1500m: (gold) Christine Nesbitt (CAN) 1:56.10 (silver) Claudia Pechstein (GER) 1:56.77 (bronze) Ireen Wüst (NED) 1:57.00
    - Standings (after 2 of 6 races): (1) Nesbitt 180 points (2) Wüst 170 (3) Pechstein 116

=== November 25, 2011 (Friday) ===
==== Baseball ====
- Asia Series in Taiwan:
  - (South Korea) Samsung Lions 10, (Australia) Perth Heat 2
  - (Japan) Fukuoka SoftBank Hawks 6, (Taiwan) Uni-President 7-Eleven Lions 5

==== Canadian football ====
- Vanier Cup in Vancouver: **McMaster Marauders** 41, Laval Rouge et Or 38 (2OT)
  - McMaster win the Cup for the first time.

==== Cricket ====
- West Indies in India:
  - 3rd Test in Mumbai, day 4: West Indies 590 & 81/2 (34 overs); India 482 (135.4 overs; Ravichandran Ashwin 103). West Indies lead by 189 runs with 8 wickets remaining.
    - Ashwin becomes the first player to score a century and record five wickets in an innings, since Jacques Kallis (RSA) in 2002.
- Pakistan vs Sri Lanka in UAE:
  - Only T20I in Abu Dhabi: Sri Lanka 141 (19.3 overs); Pakistan 142/5 (19.3 overs). **Pakistan win by 5 wickets.**

==== Cross-country skiing ====
- World Cup in Kuusamo, Finland:
  - Men's Sprint C: (gold) Teodor Peterson (SWE) 2:50.7 (silver) Nikita Kriukov (RUS) 2:51.2 (bronze) Øystein Pettersen (NOR) 2:51.7
    - Overall standings (after 2 of 38 races): (1) Johan Olsson (SWE) 100 points (2) Petter Northug (NOR) 95 (3) Roland Clara (ITA) & Dario Cologna (SUI) 60
  - Women's Sprint C: (gold) Marit Bjørgen (NOR) 2:50.1 (silver) Charlotte Kalla (SWE) 2:52.2 (bronze) Vibeke Skofterud (NOR) 2:54.0
    - Overall standings (after 2 of 38 races): (1) Bjørgen 150 points (2) Kalla 126 (3) Skofterud 103

==== Curling ====
- Pacific-Asia Championships in Nanjing, China:
  - Men's Semifinals: (the winners qualify for 2012 Capital One World Men's Curling Championship)
    - Game 3:
      - Australia 3–7 China. **China win series 3–0.**
      - South Korea 2–8 New Zealand. New Zealand lead series 2–1.
    - Game 4: South Korea 5–7 New Zealand. **New Zealand win series 3–1.**
  - Women's Semifinals: (the winners qualify for 2012 Ford World Women's Curling Championship)
    - Game 3:
      - Japan 3–10 South Korea. **South Korea win series 3–0.**
      - New Zealand 2–10 China. **China win series 3–0.**

==== Nordic combined ====
- World Cup in Kuusamo, Finland:
  - HS 142 / 10 km: (gold) Magnus Krog (NOR) 27:41.0 (silver) Akito Watabe (JPN) 27:43.5 (bronze) Tino Edelmann (GER) 27:48.1

==== Speed skating ====
- World Cup 2 in Astana, Kazakhstan:
  - Men's 500m: (gold) Mo Tae-Bum (KOR) 34.89 (silver) Tucker Fredricks (USA) 34.94 (bronze) Stefan Groothuis (NED) 35.01
    - Standings (after 3 of 12 races): (1) Mo 205 points (2) Yūya Oikawa (JPN) 190 (3) Joji Kato (JPN) 177
  - Men's 1500m: (gold) Wouter olde Heuvel (NED) 1:45.69 (silver) Denny Morrison (CAN) 1:45.80 (bronze) Håvard Bøkko (NOR) 1:45.97
    - Standings (after 2 of 6 races): (1) Groothuis 145 points (2) Shani Davis (USA) 140 (3) olde Heuvel 136
  - Women's 500m: (gold) Lee Sang-Hwa (KOR) 37.78 (silver) Jenny Wolf (GER) 38.04 (bronze) Thijsje Oenema (NED) 38.22
    - Standings (after 3 of 12 races): (1) Lee 230 points (2) Oenema 210 (3) Yu Jing (CHN) 200
  - Women's 3000m: (gold) Martina Sáblíková (CZE) 4:03.28 (silver) Claudia Pechstein (GER) 4:03.59 (bronze) Diane Valkenburg (NED) 4:05.36
    - Standings (after 2 of 6 races): (1) Sáblíková 200 points (2) Pechstein 150 (3) Ireen Wüst (NED) 140

==== Volleyball ====
- FIVB Men's World Cup in Japan, Matchday 5:
  - Iran 3–2 Argentina
  - Cuba 3–1 Serbia
  - Japan 1–3 Poland
  - Russia 3–1 Egypt
  - China 2–3 Brazil
  - United States 1–3 Italy
    - Standings (after 5 matches): Poland 13 points, Russia, Brazil 12, Italy 11, Iran, Cuba, Argentina 9, United States 6, Serbia, Egypt 3, Japan 2, China 1.

=== November 24, 2011 (Thursday) ===
==== Basketball ====
- Euroleague Regular Season Matchday 6 (teams in **bold** qualify for Top 16):
  - Group A:
    - SLUC Nancy (France) 76–75 (Italy) Bennet Cantù
    - Caja Laboral (Spain) 90–85 (OT) (Turkey) Fenerbahçe Ülker
      - Standings: Caja Laboral 4–2, (Greece) Olympiacos, Bennet Cantù, Fenerbahçe Ülker, SLUC Nancy 3–3, (Spain) Gescrap Bizkaia 2–4.
  - Group B:
    - Unicaja (Spain) 76–77 (Greece) Panathinaikos
    - KK Zagreb (Croatia) 86–74 (Germany) Brose Baskets
      - Standings: (Russia) **CSKA Moscow** 6–0, Panathinaikos 4–2, Unicaja 3–3, Brose Baskets, KK Zagreb 2–4, (Lithuania) Žalgiris Kaunas 1–5.
  - Group C:
    - Real Madrid (Spain) 93–89 (Belgium) Spirou Charleroi
    - Maccabi Tel Aviv (Israel) 85–76 (Italy) EA7 Emporio Armani
      - Standings: Maccabi Tel Aviv 5–1, Real Madrid 4–2, (Turkey) Anadolu Efes, (Serbia) Partizan Mt:s Belgrade 3–3, EA7 Emporio Armani 2–4, Spirou Basket 1–5.
  - Group D:
    - Galatasaray Medical Park (Turkey) 78–76 (OT) (Poland) Asseco Prokom Gdynia
    - **FC Barcelona Regal** (Spain) 72–46 (Slovenia) Union Olimpija Ljubljana
      - With 14 points during the game, FC Barcelona Regal's Juan Carlos Navarro (ESP) becomes the all-time Euroleague points-scoring leader, surpassing the mark of Marcus Brown (USA).
      - Standings: FC Barcelona Regal 6–0, (Italy) Montepaschi Siena, (Russia) UNICS Kazan 4–2, Galatasaray Medical Park 3–3, Union Olimpija Ljubljana 1–5, Asseco Prokom Gdynia 0–6.

==== Chess ====
- Women's World Championship in Tirana, Albania:
  - Game 8: Koneru Humpy (IND) ½–½ Hou Yifan (CHN). **Hou wins series 5½–2½**.
    - Hou retains her title.

==== Cricket ====
- West Indies in India:
  - 3rd Test in Mumbai, day 3: West Indies 590 (184.1 overs; Ravichandran Ashwin 5/156); India 281/3 (80 overs). India trail by 309 runs with 7 wickets remaining in the 1st innings.

==== Curling ====
- Pacific-Asia Championships in Nanjing, China:
  - Men (teams in **bold** advance to the playoffs):
    - Draw 10:
      - Japan 7–8 **China**
      - **New Zealand** 5–2 Chinese Taipei
      - **Australia** 6–5 **South Korea**
        - Final standings: China 9–1, South Korea 7–3, New Zealand, Australia 5–5, Chinese Taipei 3–7, Japan 1–9.
  - Women:
    - Draw 6:
      - South Korea 9–1 New Zealand
      - China 7–6 Japan
        - Final standings: China, South Korea 5–1, Japan 2–4, New Zealand 0–6.

==== Football (soccer) ====
- FIFA World Cup qualification – OFC first round in Apia, Samoa:
  - American Samoa 1–1 Cook Islands
  - Samoa 1–1 Tonga
    - Standings (after 2 matches): Samoa, American Samoa 4 points, Cook Islands, Tonga 1.
- UEFA Women's Euro 2013 qualifying Matchday 6:
  - Group 2:
    - Switzerland 8–1 Kazakhstan
    - Spain 2–2 Germany
      - Standings (after 6 matches unless stated): Spain 13 points (5 matches), Germany 10 (4), Romania 9, Switzerland 6 (4), Kazakhstan 4, Turkey 1 (5).
  - Group 5: Ukraine 0–1 Belarus
    - Standings (after 3 matches unless stated): Slovakia 7 points, Belarus 7 (4), Finland 4 (2), Ukraine 4, Estonia 0 (4).
  - Group 6: Netherlands 2–0 Croatia
    - Standings (after 4 matches unless stated): Netherlands 13 points (5 matches), England 8, Serbia 7 (5), Croatia, Slovenia 1.
- Copa Sudamericana Semifinals first leg: LDU Quito (Ecuador) 2–0 (Argentina) Vélez Sársfield

==== Volleyball ====
- FIVB Men's World Cup in Japan, Matchday 4:
  - Argentina 3–1 Cuba
  - Poland 2–3 Iran
  - Serbia 3–2 Japan
  - Egypt 0–3 United States
  - Brazil 3–0 Russia
  - Italy 3–0 China
    - Standings (after 4 matches): Brazil, Poland 10 points, Russia 9, Italy, Argentina 8, Iran 7, United States, Cuba 6, Serbia, Egypt 3, Japan 2, China 0.

=== November 23, 2011 (Wednesday) ===
==== Basketball ====
- Euroleague Regular Season Matchday 6 (team in **bold** qualify for Top 16):
  - Group A: Olympiacos (Greece) 88–81 (Spain) Gescrap Bizkaia
    - Standings: (Spain) Caja Laboral, (Italy) Bennet Cantù, (Turkey) Fenerbahçe Ülker 3–2, Olympiacos 3–3, (France) SLUC Nancy 2–3, Gescrap Bizkaia 2–4.
  - Group B: **CSKA Moscow** (Russia) 95–82 (Lithuania) Žalgiris
    - Standings: CSKA Moscow 6–0, (Greece) Panathinaikos, (Spain) Unicaja 3–2, (Germany) Brose Baskets 2–3, (Croatia) KK Zagreb 1–4, Žalgiris 1–5.
  - Group C: Anadolu Efes (Turkey) 67–58 (Serbia) Partizan Mt:s Belgrade
    - Standings: (Israel) Maccabi Tel Aviv 4–1, (Spain) Real Madrid 3–2, Anadolu Efes, Partizan Mt:s Belgrade 3–3, (Italy) EA7 Emporio Armani 2–3, (Belgium) Spirou Charleroi 1–4.
  - Group D: Montepaschi Siena (Italy) 73–79 (Russia) UNICS Kazan
    - Standings: (Spain) FC Barcelona Regal 5–0, Montepaschi Siena, UNICS Kazan 4–2, (Turkey) Galatasaray Medical Park 2–3, (Slovenia) Union Olimpija Ljubljana 1–4, (Poland) Asseco Prokom Gdynia 0–5.

==== Chess ====
- Women's World Championship in Tirana, Albania:
  - Game 7: Hou Yifan (CHN) 1–0 Koneru Humpy (IND). Hou leads series 5–2.

==== Cricket ====
- West Indies in India:
  - 3rd Test in Mumbai, day 2: West Indies 575/9 (181 overs; Darren Bravo 166); India.
- Pakistan vs Sri Lanka in UAE:
  - 5th ODI in Abu Dhabi: Sri Lanka 218/9 (50 overs); Pakistan 219/7 (47.2 overs). **Pakistan win by 3 wickets; win 5-match series 4–1.**

==== Curling ====
- Pacific-Asia Championships in Nanjing, China:
  - Men: (teams in **bold** advance to the playoffs)
    - Draw 8:
      - New Zealand 7–2 Japan
      - Chinese Taipei 5–9 Australia
      - **China** 4–3 **South Korea**
    - Draw 9:
      - Japan 8–12 **South Korea**
      - Australia 8–5 New Zealand
      - Chinese Taipei 5–8 **China**
        - Standings: China 8–1, South Korea 7–2, New Zealand, Australia 4–5, Chinese Taipei 3–6, Japan 1–8.
  - Women:
    - Draw 5:
      - South Korea 7–5 Japan
      - China 8–3 New Zealand
        - Standings: China, South Korea 4–1, Japan 2–3, New Zealand 0–5.

==== Football (soccer) ====
- UEFA Women's Euro 2013 qualifying Matchday 6:
  - Group 1:
    - North Macedonia 0–3 Poland
    - Italy 2–0 Greece
      - Standings (after 4 matches unless stated): Italy 15 points (5 matches), Russia 9, Poland 9 (5), Bosnia and Herzegovina 3, Greece, Macedonia 1.
  - Group 2: Turkey 1–2 Romania
    - Standings (after 5 matches unless stated): Spain 12 points (4 matches), Germany 9 (3), Romania 9 (6), Kazakhstan 4, Switzerland 3 (3), Turkey 1.
  - Group 3:
    - Bulgaria 0–1 Belgium
    - Hungary 2–2 Northern Ireland
      - Standings (after 5 matches unless stated): Iceland 13 points, Belgium 10, Northern Ireland 7 (4), Norway 6 (4), Hungary 4, Bulgaria 0.
  - Group 6: England 2–0 Serbia
    - Standings (after 3 matches unless stated): England 8 points (4 matches), Netherlands 7 (3), Serbia 4 (4), Croatia 1 (2), Slovenia 1.
  - Group 7: Denmark 11–0 Armenia
    - Standings (after 4 matches unless stated): Denmark 12 points, Czech Republic 7 (3), Austria 7, Portugal 3, Armenia 0 (5).
- 2012 Olympics Men's Asian qualifiers preliminary round 3, Matchday 2:
  - Group A:
    - Qatar 1–1 South Korea
    - Oman 2–0 Saudi Arabia
      - Standings (after 2 matches): South Korea 4 points, Oman 3, Qatar 2, Saudi Arabia 1.
  - Group B: United Arab Emirates 0–0 Uzbekistan
    - Standings (after 2 matches): Uzbekistan 4 points, Australia, United Arab Emirates 2, Iraq 1.
  - Group C: Malaysia 0–2 Syria
    - Standings (after 2 matches): Syria, Japan 6 points, Bahrain, Malaysia 0.
- UEFA Champions League group stage Matchday 5 (teams in **bold** qualify for Round of 16):
  - Group E:
    - **Bayer Leverkusen** (Germany) 2–1 (England) Chelsea
    - Valencia (Spain) 7–0 (Belgium) Genk
      - Standings (after 5 matches): Bayer Leverkusen 9 points, Chelsea, Valencia 8, Genk 2.
  - Group F:
    - Marseille (France) 0–1 (Greece) Olympiacos
    - **Arsenal** (England) 2–1 (Germany) Borussia Dortmund
      - Standings (after 5 matches): Arsenal 11 points, Marseille 7, Olympiacos 6, Borussia Dortmund 4.
  - Group G:
    - Zenit St. Petersburg (Russia) 0–0 (Cyprus) **APOEL**
    - Shakhtar Donetsk (Ukraine) 0–2 (Portugal) Porto
      - Standings (after 5 matches): APOEL 9 points, Zenit St. Petersburg 8, Porto 7, Shakhtar Donetsk 2.
        - APOEL become the first Cypriot team to reach the last 16 of the Champions League.
  - Group H:
    - BATE Borisov (Belarus) 0–1 (Czech Republic) Viktoria Plzeň
    - **Milan** (Italy) 2–3 (Spain) **Barcelona**
      - Standings (after 5 matches): Barcelona 13 points, Milan 8, Viktoria Plzeň 4, BATE Borisov 2.
- Copa Sudamericana Semifinals first leg: Vasco da Gama (Brazil) 1–1 Universidad de Chile

=== November 22, 2011 (Tuesday) ===
==== Baseball ====
- Major League Baseball awards:
  - National League Most Valuable Player: Ryan Braun, Milwaukee Brewers
    - Braun becomes the first Brewer to win the Award since Robin Yount in 1989.

==== Cricket ====
- West Indies in India:
  - 3rd Test in Mumbai, day 1: West Indies 267/2 (91 overs); India.

==== Curling ====
- Pacific-Asia Championships in Nanjing, China:
  - Men: (teams in **bold** advance to the playoffs)
    - Draw 6:
      - China 6–2 Australia
      - South Korea 5–6 New Zealand
      - Japan 6–8 Chinese Taipei
    - Draw 7:
      - **South Korea** 9–6 Chinese Taipei
      - Japan 8–6 Australia
      - **China** 6–4 New Zealand
        - Standings: China, South Korea 6–1, Chinese Taipei, New Zealand 3–4, Australia 2–5, Japan 1–6.
  - Women:
    - Draw 4:
      - Japan 9–1 New Zealand
      - China 9–7 South Korea
        - Standings: China, South Korea 3–1, Japan 2–2, New Zealand 0–4.

==== Football (soccer) ====
- FIFA World Cup qualification – OFC first round in Apia, Samoa:
  - American Samoa 2–1 Tonga
    - American Samoa win their first game as a member of FIFA.
  - Cook Islands 2–3 Samoa
- 2012 Olympics Men's Asian qualifiers preliminary round 3, Matchday 2:
  - Group B: Iraq 0–0 Australia
    - Standings: Uzbekistan 3 points (1 match), Australia 2 (2), United Arab Emirates 1 (1), Iraq 1 (2).
  - Group C: Bahrain 0–2 Japan
    - Standings: Japan 6 points (2 matches), Syria 3 (1), Bahrain 0 (2), Malaysia 0 (1).
- UEFA Champions League group stage Matchday 5 (teams in **bold** qualify for Round of 16):
  - Group A:
    - Napoli (Italy) 2–1 (England) Manchester City
    - **Bayern Munich** (Germany) 3–1 (Spain) Villarreal
      - Standings (after 5 matches): Bayern Munich 13 points, Napoli 8, Manchester City 7, Villarreal 0.
  - Group B:
    - CSKA Moscow (Russia) 0–2 (France) Lille
    - Trabzonspor (Turkey) 1–1 (Italy) **Internazionale**
      - Standings (after 5 matches): Internazionale 10 points, Trabzonspor 6, Lille, CSKA Moscow 5.
  - Group C:
    - Oțelul Galați (Romania) 2–3 (Switzerland) Basel
    - Manchester United (England) 2–2 (Portugal) **Benfica**
      - Standings (after 5 matches): Benfica, Manchester United 9 points, Basel 8, Oțelul Galați 0.
  - Group D:
    - **Real Madrid** (Spain) 6–2 (Croatia) Dinamo Zagreb
    - Lyon (France) 0–0 (Netherlands) Ajax
      - Standings (after 5 matches): Real Madrid 15 points, Ajax 8, Lyon 5, Dinamo Zagreb 0.

==== Snooker ====
- Mike Dunn compiles the 79th official maximum break at the qualifying stages of the 2012 German Masters.

==== Volleyball ====
- FIVB Men's World Cup in Japan, Matchday 3:
  - Iran 3–2 Serbia
  - Poland 3–1 Argentina
  - Japan 0–3 Cuba
  - China 0–3 Egypt
  - Italy 3–2 Brazil
  - United States 0–3 Russia
    - Standings (after 3 matches): Russia, Poland 9 points, Brazil 7, Cuba 6, Argentina, Italy, Iran 5, United States, Egypt 3, Japan, Serbia 1, China 0.

=== November 21, 2011 (Monday) ===
==== Baseball ====
- Major League Baseball awards:
  - American League Most Valuable Player: Justin Verlander, Detroit Tigers
    - Verlander becomes the first pitcher to be named MVP since Dennis Eckersley in 1992, and the first Tiger since Willie Hernández in 1984.

==== Chess ====
- Women's World Championship in Tirana, Albania:
  - Game 6: Koneru Humpy (IND) 0–1 Hou Yifan (CHN). Hou leads series 4–2.

==== Cricket ====
- Australia in South Africa:
  - 2nd Test in Johannesburg, day 5: South Africa 266 & 339; Australia 296 & 310/8 (86.5 overs; Vernon Philander 5/70). **Australia win by 2 wickets; 2-match series drawn 1–1**.

==== Curling ====
- Pacific-Asia Championships in Nanjing, China:
  - Men:
    - Draw 4:
      - South Korea 10–4 Japan
      - China 10–2 Chinese Taipei
      - New Zealand 8–3 Australia
    - Draw 5:
      - Chinese Taipei 8–5 New Zealand
      - China 6–4 Japan
      - South Korea 9–1 Australia
        - Standings: South Korea 5–0, China 4–1, Chinese Taipei, Australia, New Zealand 2–3, Japan 0–5.
  - Women:
    - Draw 3:
      - Japan 4–8 China
      - New Zealand 3–9 South Korea
        - Standings: South Korea 3–0, China 2–1, Japan 1–2, New Zealand 0–3.

==== Volleyball ====
- FIVB Men's World Cup in Japan, Matchday 2:
  - Cuba 3–0 Iran
  - Serbia 1–3 Poland
  - Argentina 3–2 Japan
  - Egypt 0–3 Italy
  - Brazil 3–1 United States
  - Russia 3–0 China
    - Standings (after 2 matches): Brazil, Russia, Poland 6 points, Argentina 5, Italy, United States, Cuba, Iran 3, Japan 1, Serbia, China, Egypt 0.

=== November 20, 2011 (Sunday) ===
==== Auto racing ====
- Sprint Cup Series – Chase for the Sprint Cup:
  - Ford 400 in Homestead, Florida: (1) (Indiana) Tony Stewart (Chevrolet; Stewart Haas Racing) (2) (Missouri) Carl Edwards (Ford; Roush Fenway Racing) (3) (New Jersey) Martin Truex Jr. (Toyota; Michael Waltrip Racing)
    - Final drivers' championship standings: (1) Stewart 2403 points (5 wins) (2) Edwards 2403 (1 win) (3) (California) Kevin Harvick (Chevrolet; Richard Childress Racing) 2345
      - Stewart wins his third Cup title, and becomes the first owner-driver to win a championship since Alan Kulwicki in 1992.
- V8 Supercars:
  - Norton 360 Sandown Challenge in Melbourne, Victoria (all AUS):
    - Race 26: (1) Jamie Whincup (Triple Eight Race Engineering; Holden VE Commodore) (2) Mark Winterbottom (Ford Performance Racing; Ford FG Falcon) (3) Will Davison (Ford Performance Racing; Ford FG Falcon)
      - Drivers' championship standings (after 26 of 28 races): (1) Whincup 3033 points (2) Craig Lowndes (Triple Eight Race Engineering; Holden VE Commodore) 2845 (3) Winterbottom 2449
- World Touring Car Championship:
  - Race of Macau in Macau:
    - Race 1: (1) Robert Huff (GBR) (Chevrolet; Chevrolet Cruze) (2) Yvan Muller (FRA) (Chevrolet; Chevrolet Cruze) (3) Gabriele Tarquini (ITA) (Lukoil – SUNRED; SEAT León)
    - Race 2: (1) Huff (2) Tom Coronel (NED) (ROAL Motorsport; BMW 320 TC) (3) Muller
      - Final drivers' championship standings: (1) Muller 433 points (2) Huff 430 (3) Alain Menu (SUI) (Chevrolet; Chevrolet Cruze) 323
        - Muller wins his third world title.

==== Badminton ====
- BWF Super Series:
  - Hong Kong Super Series in Hong Kong (CHN unless stated):
    - Men's singles: **Lin Dan** def. Chen Jin 21–12, 21–19
    - Women's singles: **Wang Xin** def. Tine Baun (DEN) 21–17, 21–14
    - Men's doubles: **Cai Yun**/**Fu Haifeng** def. Jung Jae-sung/Lee Yong-dae (KOR) 14–21, 24–22, 21–19
    - Women's doubles: **Wang Xiaoli**/**Yu Yang** def. Tian Qing/Zhao Yunlei 21–12, 14–2 retired
    - Mixed doubles: **Zhang Nan**/**Zhao** def. Joachim Fischer Nielsen/Christinna Pedersen (DEN) 15–21, 21–17, 21–17

==== Baseball ====
- Japan Series, Game 7 in Fukuoka: Fukuoka SoftBank Hawks 3, Chunichi Dragons 0. **Hawks win series 4–3.**
  - The Hawks win the Japan Series for the first time since 2003, and the fifth time overall. Hawks first baseman Hiroki Kokubo is named series MVP.

==== Canadian football ====
- CFL Playoffs:
  - Division Finals:
    - East in Winnipeg, Manitoba: **Winnipeg Blue Bombers** 19, Hamilton Tiger-Cats 3
    - West in Vancouver, British Columbia: **BC Lions** 40, Edmonton Eskimos 23

==== Chess ====
- Women's World Championship in Tirana, Albania:
  - Game 5: Hou Yifan (CHN) ½–½ Koneru Humpy (IND). Hou leads series 3–2.

==== Cricket ====
- Australia in South Africa:
  - 2nd Test in Johannesburg, day 4: South Africa 266 & 339 (110 overs; Hashim Amla 105, Pat Cummins 6/79); Australia 296 & 142/3 (37 overs). Australia require another 168 runs with 7 wickets remaining.
- Pakistan vs Sri Lanka in UAE:
  - 4th ODI in Sharjah: Pakistan 200 (49.3 overs); Sri Lanka 174 (45.2 overs; Shahid Afridi 5/35). **Pakistan win by 26 runs; lead 5-match series 3–1.**

==== Cross-country skiing ====
- World Cup in Sjusjøen, Norway:
  - Women's 4 × 5 km relay: (gold) Norway I (Vibeke Skofterud, Therese Johaug, Kristin Størmer Steira, Marit Bjørgen) 51:50.1 (silver) Norway II (Astrid Uhrenholdt Jacobsen, Ingvild Flugstad Østberg, Tora Berger, Marthe Kristoffersen) 52:16.1 (bronze) Finland (Krista Lähteenmäki, Aino-Kaisa Saarinen, Riitta-Liisa Roponen, Riikka Sarasoja-Lilja) 52:29.2
  - Men's 4 x 10 km relay: (gold) Norway I (Eldar Rønning, Finn Hågen Krogh, Lars Berger, Petter Northug) 1:35:24.8 (silver) Norway III (John Kristian Dahl, Ronny Ansnes, Morten Eilifsen, Sjur Røthe) 1:35:25.6 (bronze) Sweden (Marcus Hellner, Daniel Richardsson, Johan Olsson, Calle Halfvarsson) 1:35:25.9

==== Curling ====
- Pacific-Asia Championships in Nanjing, China:
  - Men:
    - Draw 2:
      - South Korea 8–7 Chinese Taipei
      - New Zealand 1–6 China
      - Australia 9–7 Japan
    - Draw 3:
      - Australia 5–3 Chinese Taipei
      - Japan 6–8 New Zealand
      - South Korea 9–6 China
        - Standings: South Korea 3–0, Australia, China 2–1, Chinese Taipei, New Zealand 1–2, Japan 0–3.
  - Women:
    - Draw 2:
      - New Zealand 1–11 China
      - Japan 3–12 South Korea
        - Standings: South Korea 2–0, China, Japan 1–1, New Zealand 0–2.

==== Football (soccer) ====
- UEFA Women's Euro 2013 qualifying Matchday 5:
  - Group 2: Romania 0–4 Spain
    - Standings (after 3 matches unless stated): Spain 12 points (4 matches), Germany 9, Romania 6, Kazakhstan 4 (5), Switzerland 3, Turkey 1 (4).
  - Group 4: Israel 0–2 Wales
    - Standings (after 4 matches unless stated): France 12 points, Republic of Ireland 6 (3), Scotland 4 (2), Wales 4, Israel 0 (5).
  - Group 7: Czech Republic 5–0 Armenia
    - Standings (after 4 matches unless stated): Denmark 9 points (3 matches), Czech Republic 7 (3), Austria 7, Portugal 3, Armenia 0.
- OFC Champions League group stage Matchday 2:
  - Group A: Waitakere United (New Zealand) 4–0 (Fiji) Ba
    - Standings (after 2 matches): Waitakere United 6 points, Ba 3, (New Caledonia) Mont-Dore, (French Polynesia) Tefana 1.
- (United States) MLS Cup Final in Carson, California: Houston Dynamo 0–1 **Los Angeles Galaxy**

==== Golf ====
- European Tour:
  - Iskandar Johor Open in Johor Bahru, Malaysia:
    - Winner: Joost Luiten (NED) 198 (−15)
      - Luiten wins his first European Tour title.
  - Alfred Dunhill Championship in Malalane, South Africa:
    - Winner: Garth Mulroy (RSA) 269 (−19)
      - Mulroy wins his first European Tour title.
- LPGA Tour:
  - CME Group Titleholders in Orlando, Florida:
    - Winner: Hee Young Park (KOR) 279 (−9)
      - Park wins her first LPGA Tour title.
- Presidents Cup in Melbourne, Australia: Internationals 15–19 **United States**
  - The United States win the Cup for the fourth successive time.

==== Gymnastics ====
- Trampoline World Championships in Birmingham, England:
  - Double Mini Trampoline Individual men: (gold) Bruno Martini (BRA) 73.300 points (silver) Austin White (USA) 72.800 (bronze) Evgeny Chernoivanov (RUS) 71.800
  - Double Mini Trampoline Individual women: (gold) Svetlana Balandina (RUS) 70.200 points (silver) Bianca Zoonekynd (RSA) 69.700 (bronze) Victoria Voronina (RUS) 68.700
  - Tumbling Individual men: (gold) Yang Song (CHN) 79.100 points (silver) Zhang Luo (CHN) 76.500 (bronze) Andrey Krylov (RUS) 75.800
  - Tumbling Individual women: (gold) Jia Fangfang (CHN) 71.700 points (silver) Anna Korobeynikova (RUS) 70.900 (bronze) Anzhelika Soldatkina (RUS) 68.400
  - Synchronised men: (gold) Tu Xiao/Dong Dong (CHN) 52.400 points (silver) Takashi Sakamoto/Yasuhiro Ueyama (JPN) 51.900 (bronze) Viatchaslau Modzel/Mikalai Kazak (BLR) 50.700
  - Trampoline Individual women: (gold) He Wenna (CHN) 56.275 points (silver) Rosannagh MacLennan (CAN) 55.360 (bronze) Li Dan (CHN) 55.330

==== Rugby union ====
- Heineken Cup pool stage Matchday 2:
  - Pool 3:
    - Leinster (Ireland) 38–13 (Scotland) Glasgow Warriors
    - Bath (England) 16–13 (France) Montpellier
      - Standings (after 2 matches): Leinster 7 points, Bath 5, Glasgow Warriors 4, Montpellier 3.
- Amlin Challenge Cup pool stage Matchday 2:
  - Pool 3: London Wasps (England) 38–7 (Italy) Rovigo
    - Standings (after 2 matches): London Wasps 10 points, (France) Bayonne 9, (France) Bordeaux Bègles, Rovigo 0.
  - Pool 5: Agen (France) 8–29 (France) Brive
    - Standings (after 2 matches): Brive 8 points, (England) Sale Sharks, Agen 5, (Spain) La Vila 0.

==== Speed skating ====
- World Cup 1 in Chelyabinsk, Russia:
  - Men's 1000m: (gold) Stefan Groothuis (NED) 1:08.49 (silver) Kjeld Nuis (NED) 1:08.56 (bronze) Denny Morrison (CAN) 1:09.26
  - Men's team pursuit: (gold) Netherlands (Sven Kramer, Jan Blokhuijsen, Wouter olde Heuvel) 3:41.25 (silver) United States (Shani Davis, Jonathan Kuck, Brian Hansen) 3:44.52 (bronze) Germany (Patrick Beckert, Marco Weber, Alexej Baumgartner) 3:45.29
  - Women's 1000m: (gold) Christine Nesbitt (CAN) 1:15.97 (silver) Margot Boer (NED) 1:16.52 (bronze) Marrit Leenstra (NED) 1:16.77
  - Women's team pursuit: (gold) Canada (Brittany Schussler, Cindy Klassen, Nesbitt) 3:02.07 (silver) Netherlands (Ireen Wüst, Diane Valkenburg, Leenstra) 3:02.72 (bronze) Russia (Yuliya Skokova, Yekaterina Lobysheva, Yekaterina Shikhova) 3:03.37

==== Volleyball ====
- FIVB Men's World Cup in Japan, Matchday 1:
  - Serbia 0–3 Argentina
  - Poland 3–0 Cuba
  - Iran 3–1 Japan
  - China 0–3 United States
  - Italy 1–3 Russia
  - Egypt 0–3 Brazil

=== November 19, 2011 (Saturday) ===
==== Auto racing ====
- Nationwide Series:
  - Ford 300 in Homestead, Florida: (1) (Michigan) Brad Keselowski (Dodge; Penske Racing) (2) (Mississippi) Ricky Stenhouse Jr. (Ford; Roush Fenway Racing) (3) (Missouri) Carl Edwards (Ford; Roush Fenway Racing)
    - Final drivers' championship standings: (1) Stenhouse Jr. 1222 points (2) (Virginia) Elliott Sadler (Chevrolet; Kevin Harvick Incorporated) 1177 (3) (Illinois) Justin Allgaier (Chevrolet; Turner Motorsports) 1105
      - Stenhouse Jr. wins the title for the first time.
- V8 Supercars:
  - Norton 360 Sandown Challenge in Melbourne, Victoria (AUS, Holden VE Commodore unless stated):
    - Race 25: (1) Rick Kelly (Kelly Racing) (2) James Courtney (Holden Racing Team) (3) Todd Kelly (Kelly Racing)
      - Drivers' championship standings (after 25 of 28 races): (1) Jamie Whincup (Triple Eight Race Engineering) 2883 points (2) Craig Lowndes (Triple Eight Race Engineering) 2725 (3) Shane van Gisbergen (NZL) (Stone Brothers Racing; Ford FG Falcon) 2312

==== Baseball ====
- Japan Series, Game 6 in Fukuoka: Chunichi Dragons 2, Fukuoka SoftBank Hawks 1. Series tied 3–3.

==== Cricket ====
- Australia in South Africa:
  - 2nd Test in Johannesburg, day 3: South Africa 266 & 229/3 (69 overs); Australia 296. South Africa lead by 199 runs with 7 wickets remaining.

==== Cross-country skiing ====
- World Cup in Sjusjøen, Norway:
  - Men's 15 km Free Individual: (gold) Johan Olsson (SWE) 32:40.9 (silver) Petter Northug (NOR) 33:12.1 (bronze) Roland Clara (ITA) 33:12.3
  - Women's 10 km Free Individual: (gold) Marit Bjørgen (NOR) 24:22.3 (silver) Charlotte Kalla (SWE) 24:49.4 (bronze) Vibeke Skofterud (NOR) 24:51.3
    - Bjørgen wins her 47th World Cup race, and surpasses Bjørn Dæhlie (NOR) for the most wins in World Cup racing.

==== Curling ====
- Pacific-Asia Championships in Nanjing, China:
  - Men:
    - Draw 1:
      - New Zealand 5–9 South Korea
      - Australia 4–11 China
      - Chinese Taipei 6–3 Japan
  - Women:
    - Draw 1:
      - New Zealand 2–8 Japan
      - South Korea 9–4 China

==== Figure skating ====
- ISU Grand Prix:
  - Trophée Eric Bompard in Paris, France:
    - Men: (gold) Patrick Chan (CAN) 240.60 points (silver) Song Nan (CHN) 224.10 (bronze) Michal Březina (CZE) 218.60
      - Standings (after 5 of 6 events): Chan 30 points (2 events), Daisuke Takahashi (JPN) & Březina 26 (2), Song & Takahiko Kozuka (JPN) 24 (2), Adam Rippon (USA) 18 (2).
    - Pairs: (gold) Tatiana Volosozhar/Maxim Trankov (RUS) 194.13 points (silver) Vera Bazarova/Yuri Larionov (RUS) 184.91 (bronze) Meagan Duhamel/Eric Radford (CAN) 176.62
      - Standings (after 5 of 6 events): Volosozhar/Trankov & Yuko Kavaguti/Alexander Smirnov (RUS) 30 points (2 events), Aliona Savchenko/Robin Szolkowy (GER) & Zhang Dan/Zhang Hao (CHN) 26 (2), Narumi Takahashi/Mervin Tran (JPN), Duhamel/Radford & Kirsten Moore-Towers/Dylan Moscovitch (CAN) 22 (2).
    - Ladies: (gold) Elizaveta Tuktamysheva (RUS) 182.89 points (silver) Carolina Kostner (ITA) 179.32 (bronze) Alissa Czisny (USA) 179.15
      - Standings (after 5 of 6 events): Tuktamysheva 30 points (2 events), Kostner & Akiko Suzuki (JPN) 28 (2), Czisny 26 (2), Mirai Nagasu (USA), Ashley Wagner (USA) & Alena Leonova (RUS) 20 (2).
    - Ice Dance: (gold) Tessa Virtue/Scott Moir (CAN) 176.93 points (silver) Nathalie Péchalat/Fabian Bourzat (FRA) 164.56 (bronze) Anna Cappellini/Luca Lanotte (ITA) 153.76
      - Standings (after 5 of 6 events): Virtue/Moir 30 points (2 events), Maia Shibutani/Alex Shibutani (USA) 28 (2), Péchalat/Bourzat & Kaitlyn Weaver/Andrew Poje (CAN) 26 (2), Cappellini/Lanotte 22 (2), Elena Ilinykh/Nikita Katsalapov (RUS) 20 (2).

==== Football (soccer) ====
- UEFA Women's Euro 2013 qualifying Matchday 5:
  - Group 1:
    - North Macedonia 2–6 Bosnia and Herzegovina
    - Greece 0–4 Russia
    - Poland 0–5 Italy
      - Standings (after 4 matches unless stated): Italy 12 points, Russia 9, Poland 6, Bosnia and Herzegovina 3, Greece, Macedonia 1 (3).
  - Group 2: Germany 17–0 Kazakhstan
    - Standings (after 3 matches unless stated): Germany, Spain 9 points, Romania 6 (4), Kazakhstan 4 (5), Switzerland 3, Turkey 1 (4).
  - Group 3:
    - Belgium 5–0 Bulgaria
    - Northern Ireland 3–1 Norway
      - Standings (after 4 matches unless stated): Iceland 13 points (5 matches), Belgium 7, Northern Ireland 6 (3), Norway 6, Hungary 3, Bulgaria 0.
  - Group 5: Slovakia 3–0 Belarus
    - Standings (after 3 matches unless stated): Slovakia 7 points, Finland 4 (2), Belarus 4, Ukraine 4 (2), Estonia 0 (4).
  - Group 6:
    - Serbia 4–2 Croatia
    - Slovenia 0–2 Netherlands
      - Standings (after 4 matches unless stated): Netherlands 10 points, Serbia 7, England 5 (3), Slovenia 1, Croatia 1 (3).
  - Group 7: Portugal 0–1 Austria
    - Standings (after 4 matches unless stated): Denmark 9 points (3 matches), Austria 7, Czech Republic 4 (2), Portugal 3, Armenia 0 (3).
- CAF Confederation Cup Final first leg: Club Africain (Tunisia) 1–0 (Morocco) Maghreb de Fès
- OFC Champions League group stage Matchday 2:
  - Group B:
    - Auckland City (New Zealand) 2–0 (Papua New Guinea) Hekari United
    - Amicale (Vanuatu) 2–0 (Solomon Islands) Koloale
      - Standings (after 2 matches): Auckland City 6 points, Amicale 4, Hekari United 1, Koloale 0.

==== Gymnastics ====
- Trampoline World Championships in Birmingham, England:
  - Double Mini Trampoline Team men: (gold) Canada (Denis Vachon, Alexander Seifert, Keegan Soehn, Jonathon Schwaiger) 108.600 points (silver) Brazil (Edmon de Abreu, Arthur Iotte, Bruno Martini, Rodrigo Bachur) 103.200 (bronze) United States (Ryan Roberts, Austin White, Kalon Ludvigson, Trey Katz) 85.600
  - Double Mini Trampoline Team women: (gold) Canada (Gillian Bruce, Mariah Madigan, Corissa Boychuk, Chelsea Nerpio) 104.100 points (silver) Portugal (Joana Pereira da Silva, Andreia Robalo, Silvia Saiote, Ana Robalo) 102.900 (bronze) United States (Kristle Lowell, Marina Moskalenko, Erin Jauch, Erica Owen) 100.800
  - Tumbling Team men: (gold) China (Zhang Lingfeng, Zhang Luo, Yang Song, Tao Yi) 115.500 points (silver) Russia (Grigory Noskov, Tagir Murtazaev, Andrey Krylov, Mikhail Kostyanov) 113.000 (bronze) Canada (Schwaiger, Jocelyn Charpentier-Leclerc, Seifert, Vincent Lavoie) 103.100
  - Tumbling Team women: (gold) China (Chen Lingxi, Jia Fangfang, Zhang Yuanyuan, Guan Shuang) 102.000 points (silver) Russia (Victoria Danilenko, Anzhelika Soldatkina, Anna Korobeynikova, Elena Krasnokutskaya) 101.000 (bronze) France (Mathilde Millory, Lauriane Lamperim, Jessica Courrèges-Clercq) 95.200
  - Synchronised women: (gold) Anna Dogonadze/Jessica Simon (GER) 48.100 points (silver) Karen Cockburn/Rosannagh MacLennan (CAN) 47.600 (bronze) Amanda Parker/Kat Driscoll (GBR) 47.000
  - Trampoline Individual men: (gold) Lu Chunlong (CHN) 62.145 points (silver) Dong Dong (CHN) 61.460 (bronze) Masaki Ito (JPN) 60.864

==== Mixed martial arts ====
- UFC 139 in San Jose, California, United States (USA unless stated):
  - Light Heavyweight bout: **Dan Henderson** def. Maurício Rua (BRA) via unanimous decision (48–47, 48–47, 48–47)
  - Middleweight bout: **Wanderlei Silva** (BRA) def. Cung Le via TKO (knees and punches)
  - Bantamweight bout: **Urijah Faber** def. Brian Bowles via submission (guillotine choke)
  - Welterweight bout: **Martin Kampmann** (DEN) def. Rick Story via unanimous decision (30–27, 30–27, 29–28)
  - Light Heavyweight bout: **Stephan Bonnar** def. Kyle Kingsbury via unanimous decision (30–27, 30–25, 30–27)

==== Rugby league ====
- Four Nations Final in Leeds: **Australia** 30–8 England
  - Australia win the title for the second time.

==== Rugby union ====
- Heineken Cup pool stage Matchday 2:
  - Pool 1: Castres (France) 24–27 (Ireland) Munster
    - Standings (after 2 matches): (Wales) Scarlets 9 points, Munster 8, (England) Northampton Saints 2, Castres 1.
  - Pool 4: Leicester Tigers (England) 20–9 (Ireland) Ulster
    - Standings (after 2 matches): Leicester Tigers 8 points, (France) Clermont 6, Ulster 4, (Italy) Aironi 0.
  - Pool 5:
    - Biarritz (France) 15–10 (England) Saracens
    - Benetton Treviso (Italy) 26–26 (Wales) Ospreys
      - Standings (after 2 matches): Saracens, Ospreys 6 points, Biarritz 5, Benetton Treviso 2.
  - Pool 6:
    - Gloucester (England) 9–28 (England) Harlequins
    - Connacht (Ireland) 10–36 (France) Toulouse
      - Standings (after 2 matches): Toulouse, Harlequins 8 points, Gloucester 1, Connacht 0.
- Amlin Challenge Cup pool stage Matchday 2:
  - Pool 1: Crociati Parma (Italy) 3–34 (England) Worcester Warriors
    - Standings (after 2 matches): (France) Stade Français 9 points, Worcester Warriors, (Romania) București Oaks 5, Crociati Parma 0.
  - Pool 2:
    - Petrarca Padova (Italy) 3–34 (England) Newcastle Falcons
    - Lyon (France) 19–26 (France) Toulon
      - Standings (after 2 matches): Toulon, Newcastle Falcons 9 points, Lyon 1, Petrarca Padova 0.
  - Pool 4: Exeter Chiefs (England) 68–0 (Italy) Cavalieri Prato
    - Standings (after 2 matches): (Wales) Newport Gwent Dragons 9 points, Exeter Chiefs 6, (France) Perpignan 4, Cavalieri Prato 0.

==== Speed skating ====
- World Cup 1 in Chelyabinsk, Russia:
  - 500 m women: (gold) Yu Jing (CHN) 37.65 (silver) Lee Sang-Hwa (KOR) 38.09 (bronze) Jenny Wolf (GER) 38.22
    - Standings (after 2 of 12 races): (1) Yu 200 points (2) Thijsje Oenema (NED) 140 (3) Lee 130
  - 500 m men: (gold) Joji Kato (JPN) 34.92 (silver) Mo Tae-Bum (KOR) 35.01 (bronze) Yūya Oikawa (JPN) 35.14
    - Standings (after 2 of 12 races): (1) Kato 145 points (2) Oikawa 140 (3) Jan Smeekens (NED) 130
  - 1500 m women: (gold) Ireen Wüst (NED) 1:57.02 (silver) Christine Nesbitt (CAN) 1:57.44 (bronze) Marrit Leenstra (NED) 1:58.27
  - 5000 m men (all NED): (gold) Jorrit Bergsma 6:18.74 (silver) Sven Kramer 6:20.60 (bronze) Bob de Jong 6:21.96

==== Snowboarding ====
- World Cup in Stockholm, Sweden:
  - Big Air men: (gold) Niklas Mattsson (SWE) 172.4 points (silver) Michael Macho (AUT) 167.4 (bronze) Alexey Sobolev (RUS) 163.4
    - Big Air standings: (1) Mattsson 1160 points (2) Janne Korpi (FIN) 1020 (3) Seppe Smits (BEL) 850
    - Freestyle Overall standings: (1) Korpi 2620 points (2) Dimi de Jong (NED) 1480 (3) Mattsson 1160

=== November 18, 2011 (Friday) ===
==== Chess ====
- Women's World Championship in Tirana, Albania:
  - Game 4: Hou Yifan (CHN) ½–½ Koneru Humpy (IND). Hou leads series 2½–1½.

==== Cricket ====
- Australia in South Africa:
  - 2nd Test in Johannesburg, day 2: South Africa 266 & 0/0 (0.4 overs); Australia 296 (76.4 overs). South Africa trail by 30 runs with 10 wickets remaining.
- Pakistan vs Sri Lanka in UAE:
  - 3rd ODI in Dubai: Pakistan 257/8 (50 overs); Sri Lanka 236 (48.5 overs). **Pakistan win by 21 runs; lead 5-match series 2–1.**

==== Gymnastics ====
- Trampoline World Championships in Birmingham, England:
  - Trampoline team men: (gold) Japan (Tetsuya Sotomura, Yasuhiro Uyeyama, Masaki Ito) 175.474 points (silver) China (Tu Xiao, Lu Chunlong, Dong Dong) 154.440 (bronze) Russia (Aleksey Ilichev, Nikita Fedorenko, Dmitry Ushakov) 152.030
  - Trampoline team women: (gold) China (He Wenna, Le Dan, Huang Shanshan) 164.485 points (silver) United Kingdom (Kat Driscoll, Laura Gallagher, Emma Smith) 159.585 (bronze) Canada (Karen Cockburn, Rosannagh MacLennan, Samantha Smith) 159.085

==== Rugby union ====
- Heineken Cup pool stage Matchday 2:
  - Pool 1: Northampton Saints (England) 23–28 (Wales) Scarlets
    - Standings: Scarlets 9 points (2 matches), (Ireland) Munster 4 (1), Northampton Saints 2 (2), (France) Castres 0 (1).
  - Pool 2:
    - Cardiff Blues (Wales) 24–18 (England) London Irish
    - Edinburgh (Scotland) 48–47 (France) Racing Métro
      - Standings (after 2 matches): Edinburgh 9 points, Cardiff Blues 8, Racing Métro 3, London Irish 2.
  - Pool 4: Clermont (France) 54–3 (Italy) Aironi
    - Standings: Clermont 6 points (2 matches), (England) Leicester Tigers, (Ireland) Ulster 4 (1), Aironi 0 (2).
- Amlin Challenge Cup pool stage Matchday 2:
  - Pool 1: Stade Français (France) 49–3 (Romania) București Oaks
    - Standings: Stade Français 9 points (2 matches), București Oaks 5 (2), (England) Worcester Warriors, (Italy) Crociati Parma 0 (1).
  - Pool 5: Sale Sharks (England) 59–6 (Spain) La Vila
    - Standings: Sale Sharks 5 points (2 matches), (France) Agen 5 (1), (France) Brive 4 (1), La Vila 0 (2).

==== Speed skating ====
- World Cup 1 in Chelyabinsk, Russia:
  - Men's 500m: (gold) Pekka Koskela (FIN) 35.00 (silver) Jan Smeekens (NED) 35.01 (bronze) Yūya Oikawa (JPN) 35.07
  - Men's 1500m: (gold) Stefan Groothuis (NED) 1:45.70 (silver) Shani Davis (USA) 1:46.27 (bronze) Ivan Skobrev (RUS) 1:46.47
  - Women's 500m: (gold) Yu Jing (CHN) 37.81 (silver) Maki Tsuji (JPN) & Thijsje Oenema (NED) 38.22(3)
  - Women's 3000m: (gold) Martina Sáblíková (CZE) 4:06.54 (silver) Ireen Wüst (NED) 4:07.16 (bronze) Claudia Pechstein (GER) 4:07.81

==== Volleyball ====
- FIVB Women's World Cup in Japan, Matchday 11 (teams in **bold** qualify for the 2012 Olympics):
  - **Italy** 3–0 Kenya
  - **China** 3–0 Germany
  - Japan 3–0 **United States**
  - Algeria 0–3 Serbia
  - Dominican Republic 0–3 Brazil
  - Argentina 0–3 South Korea
    - Final standings: Italy 28 points, United States, China 26, Japan 24, Brazil 21, Germany 20, Serbia 18, Dominican Republic 12, South Korea 11, Argentina 9, Algeria 3, Kenya 0.
      - Italy win the Cup for the second successive time.

=== November 17, 2011 (Thursday) ===
==== Baseball ====
- Japan Series, Game 5 in Nagoya: Fukuoka SoftBank Hawks 5, Chunichi Dragons 0. Hawks lead series 3–2.
- Major League Baseball awards:
  - National League Cy Young Award: Clayton Kershaw, Los Angeles Dodgers

==== Basketball ====
- Euroleague Regular Season Matchday 5:
  - Group B: Brose Baskets (Germany) 79–76 (Greece) Panathinaikos
    - Standings: (Russia) CSKA Moscow 5–0, Panathinaikos, (Spain) Unicaja 3–2, Brose Baskets 2–3, (Lithuania) Žalgiris, (Croatia) KK Zagreb 1–4.
  - Group C:
    - Maccabi Tel Aviv (Israel) 69–59 (Belgium) Spirou Charleroi
    - Real Madrid (Spain) 104–84 (Turkey) Anadolu Efes
    - EA7 Emporio Armani (Italy) 65–69 (Serbia) Partizan Mt:s Belgrade
      - Standings: Maccabi Tel Aviv 4–1, Real Madrid, Partizan Mt:s Belgrade 3–2, EA7 Emporio Armani, Anadolu Efes 2–3, Spirou Charleroi 1–4.
  - Group D:
    - UNICS Kazan (Russia) 81–51 (Slovenia) Union Olimpija Ljubljana
    - Galatasaray Medical Park (Turkey) 66–70 (Spain) FC Barcelona Regal
    - Montepaschi Siena (Italy) 84–73 (Poland) Asseco Prokom Gdynia
      - Standings: FC Barcelona Regal 5–0, Montepaschi Siena 4–1, UNICS Kazan 3–2, Galatasaray Medical Park 2–3, Union Olimpija Ljubljana 1–4, Asseco Prokom Gdynia 0–5.

==== Chess ====
- Women's World Championship in Tirana, Albania:
  - Game 3: Koneru Humpy (IND) 0–1 Hou Yifan (CHN). Hou leads series 2–1.

==== Cricket ====
- West Indies in India:
  - 2nd Test in Kolkata, day 4: India 631/7d; West Indies 153 & 463 (f/o, 126.3 overs; Darren Bravo 136). **India win by an innings and 15 runs; lead 3-match series 2–0.**
- Australia in South Africa:
  - 2nd Test in Johannesburg, day 1: South Africa 266 (71 overs); Australia.

==== Football (soccer) ====
- Copa Sudamericana Quarterfinals second leg (first leg scores in parentheses):
  - **Universidad de Chile** 3–0 (2–1) (Argentina) Arsenal. Universidad de Chile win 6–0 on points.
  - Libertad (Paraguay) 1–0 (0–1) (Ecuador) **LDU Quito**. 3–3 on points, 1–1 on aggregate; LDU Quito win 5–4 on penalties.

==== Rugby union ====
- Amlin Challenge Cup pool stage Matchday 2:
  - Pool 3: Bayonne (France) 20–3 (France) Bordeaux Bègles
    - Standings: Bayonne 9 points (2 matches), (England) London Wasps 5 (1), Bordeaux Bègles 0 (2), (Italy) Rovigo 0 (1).
  - Pool 4: Newport Gwent Dragons (Wales) 23–13 (France) Perpignan
    - Standings: Newport Gwent Dragons 9 points (2 matches), Perpignan 4 (2), (England) Exeter Chiefs 1 (1), (Italy) Cavalieri Prato 0 (1).

==== Volleyball ====
- FIVB Women's World Cup in Japan, Matchday 10 (teams in **bold** qualify for the 2012 Olympics):
  - China 3–0 Kenya
  - **Italy** 1–3 **United States**
  - Japan 3–2 Germany
  - Dominican Republic 3–2 South Korea
  - Algeria 0–3 Brazil
  - Argentina 0–3 Serbia
    - Standings (after 10 matches): United States 26 points, Italy 25, China 23, Japan 21, Germany 20, Brazil 18, Serbia 15, Dominican Republic 12, Argentina 9, South Korea 8, Algeria 3, Kenya 0.

=== November 16, 2011 (Wednesday) ===
==== Baseball ====
- Japan Series, Game 4 in Nagoya: Fukuoka SoftBank Hawks 2, Chunichi Dragons 1. Series tied 2–2.
- Major League Baseball awards:
  - Managers of the Year:
    - American League: Joe Maddon, Tampa Bay Rays
    - National League: Kirk Gibson, Arizona Diamondbacks

==== Basketball ====
- Euroleague Regular Season Matchday 5:
  - Group A:
    - Fenerbahçe Ülker (Turkey) 85–83 (OT) (Italy) Bennet Cantù
    - Caja Laboral (Spain) 84–89 (Spain) Gescrap Bizkaia
    - Olympiacos (Greece) 91–78 (France) SLUC Nancy
      - Standings: Caja Laboral, Bennet Cantù, Fenerbahçe Ülker 3–2, Olympiacos, Gescrap Bizkaia, SLUC Nancy 2–3.
  - Group B:
    - CSKA Moscow (Russia) 77–66 (Spain) Unicaja
    - KK Zagreb (Croatia) 80–78 (Lithuania) Žalgiris
      - Standings: CSKA Moscow 5–0, (Greece) Panathinaikos 3–1, Unicaja 3–2, (Germany) Brose Baskets 1–3, Žalgiris, KK Zagreb 1–4.

==== Cricket ====
- West Indies in India:
  - 2nd Test in Kolkata, day 3: India 631/7d; West Indies 153 (48 overs) & 195/3 (f/o, 62 overs). West Indies trail by 283 runs with 7 wickets remaining.

==== Football (soccer) ====
- 2014 FIFA World Cup qualification (CAF) First round, second leg (first leg score in parentheses): **Ethiopia** 5–0 (0–0) Somalia. Ethiopia win 5–0 on aggregate.

==== Volleyball ====
- FIVB Women's World Cup in Japan, Matchday 9 (team in **bold** qualify for the 2012 Olympics):
  - China 2–3 United States
  - **Italy** 3–2 Germany
  - Japan 3–0 Kenya
  - Dominican Republic 3–2 Serbia
  - Algeria 0–3 South Korea
  - Argentina 0–3 Brazil
    - Standings (after 9 matches): Italy 25 points, United States 23, China 20, Japan, Germany 19, Brazil 15, Serbia 12, Dominican Republic 10, Argentina 9, South Korea 7, Algeria 3, Kenya 0.

=== November 15, 2011 (Tuesday) ===
==== Baseball ====
- Japan Series, Game 3 in Nagoya: Fukuoka SoftBank Hawks 4, Chunichi Dragons 2. Dragons lead series 2–1.
- Major League Baseball awards:
  - American League Cy Young Award: Justin Verlander, Detroit Tigers

==== Chess ====
- Women's World Championship in Tirana, Albania:
  - Game 2: Hou Yifan (CHN) ½–½ Koneru Humpy (IND). Series tied 1–1.

==== Cricket ====
- West Indies in India:
  - 2nd Test in Kolkata, day 2: India 631/7d (151.2 overs; V. V. S. Laxman 176*, Mahendra Singh Dhoni 144); West Indies 34/2 (12 overs). West Indies trail by 597 runs with 8 wickets remaining in the 1st innings.

==== Football (soccer) ====
- UEFA Euro 2012 Qualifying play-offs, second leg (first leg scores in parentheses):
  - **Croatia** 0–0 (3–0) Turkey. Croatia win 3–0 on aggregate.
  - Montenegro 0–1 (0–2) **Czech Republic**. Czech Republic win 3–0 on aggregate.
  - **Republic of Ireland** 1–1 (4–0) Estonia. Republic of Ireland win 5–1 on aggregate.
  - **Portugal** 6–2 (0–0) Bosnia and Herzegovina. Portugal win 6–2 on aggregate.
- 2014 FIFA World Cup qualification (CONMEBOL) Matchday 4:
  - Colombia 1–2 Argentina
  - Ecuador 2–0 Peru
  - Chile 2–0 Paraguay
  - Venezuela 1–0 Bolivia
    - Standings (after 4 matches unless stated): Uruguay 7 points (3 matches), Argentina, Venezuela 7, Ecuador 6 (3), Chile 6, Colombia 4 (3), Paraguay 4, Peru 3 (3), Bolivia 1.
- 2014 FIFA World Cup qualification (CAF) First round, second leg (first leg scores in parentheses):
  - Burundi 2–1 (0–1) **Lesotho**. 2–2 on aggregate; Lesotho win on away goals.
  - Madagascar 2–1 (0–2) **Equatorial Guinea**. Equatorial Guinea win 3–2 on aggregate.
  - **Togo** 1–0 (1–1) Guinea-Bissau. Togo win 2–1 on aggregate.
  - **Rwanda** 3–1 (1–1) Eritrea. Rwanda win 4–2 on aggregate.
  - **Congo** 1–1 (5–0) São Tomé and Príncipe. Congo win 6–1 on aggregate.
  - **Tanzania** 0–1 (2–1) Chad. 2–2 on aggregate; Tanzania win on away goals.
  - **Kenya** 4–0 (3–0) Seychelles. Kenya win 7–0 on aggregate.
  - **Mozambique** 4–1 (1–0) Comoros. Mozambique win 5–1 on aggregate.
  - **Namibia** 4–0 (4–0) Djibouti. Namibia win 8–0 on aggregate.
  - **DR Congo** 5–1 (3–1) Swaziland. Congo DR win 8–2 on aggregate.
- 2014 FIFA World Cup qualification (AFC) Third round, matchday 5 (teams in **bold** advance to the fourth round):
  - Group A:
    - Singapore 0–4 China
    - **Jordan** 1–3 **Iraq**
      - Standings (after 5 matches): Jordan, Iraq 12 points, China PR 6, Singapore 0.
  - Group B:
    - Lebanon 2–1 South Korea
    - Kuwait 2–1 United Arab Emirates
      - Standings (after 5 matches): South Korea, Lebanon 10 points, Kuwait 8, United Arab Emirates 0.
  - Group C:
    - North Korea 1–0 **Japan**
    - **Uzbekistan** 3–0 Tajikistan
      - Standings (after 5 matches): Uzbekistan 13 points, Japan 10, North Korea 6, Tajikistan 0.
  - Group D:
    - Thailand 0–1 **Australia**
    - Saudi Arabia 0–0 Oman
      - Standings (after 5 matches): Australia 12 points, Saudi Arabia 6, Oman 5, Thailand 4.
  - Group E:
    - Indonesia 1–4 **Iran**
    - Qatar 0–0 Bahrain
      - Standings (after 5 matches): Iran 11 points, Qatar 9, Bahrain 6, Indonesia 0.
- 2014 FIFA World Cup qualification (CONCACAF) Second round, matchday 6 (teams in **bold** advance to the Third round):
  - Group A: **El Salvador** 4–0 Suriname
    - Final standings: El Salvador 18 points, Dominican Republic 8, Suriname 7, Cayman Islands 1.
  - Group B: Trinidad and Tobago 2–0 **Guyana**
    - Final standings: Guyana 13 points, Trinidad and Tobago 12, Bermuda 10, Barbados 0.
  - Group C: **Panama** 3–0 Dominica
    - Final standings: Panama 12 points, Nicaragua 6, Dominica 0.
  - Group D: **Canada** 4–0 Saint Kitts and Nevis
    - Final standings: Canada 14 points, Puerto Rico 9, Saint Kitts and Nevis 7, Saint Lucia 1.
  - Group E:
    - Grenada 1–4 **Guatemala**
    - Saint Vincent and the Grenadines 0–2 Belize
      - Final standings: Guatemala 18 points, Belize 7, Saint Vincent and the Grenadines 5, Grenada 4.
  - Group F:
    - Haiti 2–1 **Antigua and Barbuda**
    - Curaçao 6–1 U.S. Virgin Islands
      - Final standings: Antigua and Barbuda 15 points, Haiti 13, Curaçao 7, U.S. Virgin Islands 0.
- Friendly internationals (top 10 in FIFA World Rankings):
  - Costa Rica 2–2 (1) Spain
  - (3) Germany 3–0 (2) Netherlands
  - (6) Italy 0–1 (4) Uruguay
  - (7) England 1–0 Sweden
  - (10) Denmark 2–1 Finland

=== November 14, 2011 (Monday) ===
==== Baseball ====
- Major League Baseball awards:
  - Rookies of the Year:
    - American League: Jeremy Hellickson, Tampa Bay Rays
    - National League: Craig Kimbrel, Atlanta Braves
- Nippon Professional Baseball awards:
  - Eiji Sawamura Award: Masahiro Tanaka, Tohoku Rakuten Golden Eagles

==== Chess ====
- Women's World Championship in Tirana, Albania:
  - Game 1: Koneru Humpy (IND) ½–½ Hou Yifan (CHN)

==== Cricket ====
- West Indies in India:
  - 2nd Test in Kolkata, day 1: India 346/5 (87.3 overs; Rahul Dravid 119); West Indies.
- Pakistan vs Sri Lanka in UAE:
  - 2nd ODI in Dubai: Sri Lanka 235/7 (50 overs); Pakistan 210 (46.3 overs). **Sri Lanka win by 25 runs; 5-match series tied 1–1.**

==== Football (soccer) ====
- 2014 FIFA World Cup qualification (CONCACAF) Second round, matchday 6 (teams in **bold** advance to the Third round):
  - Group A: Cayman Islands 1–1 Dominican Republic
    - Standings: **El Salvador** 15 points (5 matches), Dominican Republic 8 (6), Suriname 7 (5), Cayman Islands 1 (6).
  - Group B: Barbados 1–2 Bermuda
    - Standings: **Guyana** 13 points (5 matches), Bermuda 10 (6), Trinidad and Tobago 9 (5), Barbados 0 (6).
  - Group D: Puerto Rico 3–0 Saint Lucia
    - Standings: **Canada** 11 points (5 matches), Puerto Rico 9 (6), Saint Kitts and Nevis 7 (5), Saint Lucia 1 (6).
- Friendly international in Al Rayyan, Qatar (top 10 in FIFA World Rankings): Egypt 0–2 (5) Brazil

==== Golf ====
- European Tour:
  - Barclays Singapore Open in Sentosa, Singapore:
    - Winner: Gonzalo Fernández-Castaño (ESP) 199 (−14)^{PO}
      - Fernández-Castaño defeats Juvic Pagunsan (PHI) on the second playoff hole, to win his fifth European Tour title and first since 2008.

=== November 13, 2011 (Sunday) ===
==== Auto racing ====
- Formula One:
  - Abu Dhabi Grand Prix in Yas Island, United Arab Emirates: (1) Lewis Hamilton (GBR) (McLaren–Mercedes) (2) Fernando Alonso (ESP) (Ferrari) (3) Jenson Button (GBR) (McLaren-Mercedes)
    - Drivers' championship standings (after 18 of 19 races): (1) Sebastian Vettel (GER) (Red Bull–Renault) 374 points (2) Button 255 (3) Alonso 245
- Sprint Cup Series – Chase for the Sprint Cup:
  - Kobalt Tools 500 in Avondale, Arizona: (1) (Washington (state)) Kasey Kahne (Toyota; Red Bull Racing Team) (2) (Missouri) Carl Edwards (Ford; Roush Fenway Racing) (3) (Indiana) Tony Stewart (Chevrolet; Stewart Haas Racing)
    - Drivers' championship standings (after 35 of 36 races): (1) Edwards 2359 points (2) Stewart 2356 (3) (California) Kevin Harvick (Chevrolet; Richard Childress Racing) 2308
- V8 Supercars:
  - Falken Tasmania Challenge in Launceston, Tasmania (all AUS):
    - Race 24: (1) Jamie Whincup (Triple Eight Race Engineering; Holden VE Commodore) (2) Will Davison (Ford Performance Racing; Ford FG Falcon) (3) Mark Winterbottom (Ford Performance Racing; Ford FG Falcon)
      - Drivers' championship standings (after 24 of 28 races): (1) Whincup 2817 points (2) Craig Lowndes (Triple Eight Race Engineering; Holden VE Commodore) 2623 (3) Winterbottom 2215
- World Rally Championship:
  - Wales Rally GB in Cardiff, Great Britain (all Ford Fiesta RS WRC): (1) Jari-Matti Latvala/Miikka Anttila (FIN) (2) Mads Østberg (NOR)/Jonas Andersson (SWE) (3) Henning Solberg (NOR)/Ilka Minor (AUT)
    - Final drivers' championship standings: (1) Sébastien Loeb (FRA) (Citroën DS3 WRC) 222 points (2) Mikko Hirvonen (FIN) (Ford Fiesta RS WRC) 214 (3) Sébastien Ogier (FRA) (Citroën DS3 WRC) 196
      - Loeb wins his eighth consecutive world title.

==== Baseball ====
- Japan Series, Game 2 in Fukuoka: Chunichi Dragons 2, Fukuoka SoftBank Hawks 1 (F/10). Dragons lead series 2–0.

==== Figure skating ====
- ISU Grand Prix:
  - NHK Trophy in Sapporo, Japan:
    - Men: (gold) Daisuke Takahashi (JPN) 259.75 points (silver) Takahiko Kozuka (JPN) 235.02 (bronze) Ross Miner (USA) 212.36
      - Standings (after 4 of 6 events): Takahashi 26 points (2 events), Kozuka 24 (2), Kevin van der Perren (BEL) & Miner 16 (2), Patrick Chan (CAN), Jeremy Abbott (USA) & Michal Březina (CZE) 15 (1).

==== Football (soccer) ====
- Kazakhstan Cup Final in Almaty: Tobol 0–1 **Ordabasy**
  - Ordabasy win the Cup for the first time.

==== Golf ====
- European Tour:
  - Barclays Singapore Open in Sentosa, Singapore: Playoff suspended due to lightning; play continues November 14.
- LPGA Tour:
  - Lorena Ochoa Invitational in Guadalajara, Mexico:
    - Winner: Catriona Matthew (SCO) 276 (−12)
      - Matthew wins her fourth LPGA Tour title.

==== Rugby league ====
- Four Nations in England and Wales (teams in **bold** advance to the Final):
  - Round three in Wrexham: Wales 14–56 **Australia**
    - Final standings: Australia 6 points, **England** 4, New Zealand 2, Wales 0.

==== Rugby union ====
- Heineken Cup pool stage Matchday 1:
  - Pool 3: Glasgow Warriors (Scotland) 26–21 (England) Bath
  - Pool 5: Saracens (England) 42–17 (Italy) Benetton Treviso
  - Pool 6: Toulouse (France) 21–17 (England) Gloucester
- Amlin Challenge Cup pool stage Matchday 1:
  - Pool 1: Bucharest Wolves (Romania) 34–7 (Italy) Crociati Parma

==== Snooker ====
- Players Tour Championship – Event 9: Antwerp Open in Antwerp, Belgium:
  - Final: Ronnie O'Sullivan (ENG) 3–4 **Judd Trump** (ENG)
    - Trump wins his sixth professional title.
    - Order of Merit (after 9 of 12 events): (1) O'Sullivan 29,600 (2) Trump 28,900 (3) Neil Robertson (AUS) 27,100

==== Tennis ====
- ATP World Tour:
  - BNP Paribas Masters in Paris, France:
    - Final: **Roger Federer** (SUI) def. Jo-Wilfried Tsonga (FRA) 6–1, 7–6(3)
      - Federer wins his third title of the year, and 69th of his career.

==== Volleyball ====
- FIVB Women's World Cup in Japan, Matchday 8:
  - Italy 3–0 Serbia
  - China 3–0 South Korea
  - Japan 3–0 Brazil
  - Argentina 0–3 Germany
  - Algeria 3–1 Kenya
  - Dominican Republic 0–3 United States
    - Standings (after 8 matches): Italy 23 points, United States 21, China 19, Germany 18, Japan 16, Brazil 12, Serbia 11, Argentina 9, Dominican Republic 8, South Korea 4, Algeria 3, Kenya 0.

==== Weightlifting ====
- World Championships in Paris, France:
  - Men's +105 kg:
    - Snatch: (gold) Behdad Salimi (IRN) 214 kg (WR) (silver) Ihor Shymechko (UKR) 200 kg (bronze) Sajjad Anoushiravani (IRN) 198 kg
    - Clean & Jerk: (gold) Salimi 250 kg (silver) Anoushiravani 241 kg (bronze) Jeon Sang-Guen (KOR) 241 kg
    - Total: (gold) Salimi 464 kg (silver) Anoushiravani 439 kg (bronze) Jeon 433 kg
  - Women's +75 kg:
    - Snatch: (gold) Tatiana Kashirina (RUS) 147 kg (WR) (silver) Zhou Lulu (CHN) 146 kg (bronze) Olha Korobka (UKR) 127 kg
    - Clean & Jerk: (gold) Zhou 182 kg (silver) Kashirina 175 kg (bronze) Korobka 157 kg
    - Total: (gold) Zhou 328 kg (WR) (silver) Kashirina 322 kg (bronze) Korobka 284 kg

=== November 12, 2011 (Saturday) ===
==== Auto racing ====
- Nationwide Series:
  - WYPALL* 200 Powered by Kimberly-Clark Professional in Avondale, Arizona: (1) (Ohio) Sam Hornish Jr. (Dodge; Penske Racing) (2) (Michigan) Brad Keselowski (Dodge; Penske Racing) (3) (Missouri) Carl Edwards (Ford; Roush Fenway Racing)
    - Drivers' championship standings (after 33 of 34 races): (1) (Mississippi) Ricky Stenhouse Jr. (Ford; Roush Fenway Racing) 1179 points (2) (Virginia) Elliott Sadler (Chevrolet; Kevin Harvick Incorporated) 1138 (3) (Illinois) Justin Allgaier (Chevrolet; Turner Motorsports) 1074
- V8 Supercars:
  - Falken Tasmania Challenge in Launceston, Tasmania (AUS unless stated):
    - Race 23 (all Holden VE Commodore): (1) Jamie Whincup (Triple Eight Race Engineering) (2) Craig Lowndes (Triple Eight Race Engineering) (3) Garth Tander (Holden Racing Team)
      - Drivers' championship standings (after 23 of 28 races): (1) Whincup 2667 points (2) Lowndes 2512 (3) Shane van Gisbergen (Stone Brothers Racing; Ford FG Falcon) 2105

==== Baseball ====
- Japan Series, Game 1 in Fukuoka: Chunichi Dragons 2, Fukuoka SoftBank Hawks 1 (F/10). Dragons lead series 1–0.

==== Figure skating ====
- ISU Grand Prix:
  - NHK Trophy in Sapporo, Japan:
    - Ice dancing: (gold) Maia Shibutani/Alex Shibutani (USA) 151.85 points (silver) Kaitlyn Weaver/Andrew Poje (CAN) 151.76 (bronze) Elena Ilinykh/Nikita Katsalapov (RUS) 149.48
      - Standings (after 4 of 6 events): Shibutani/Shibutani 28 points (2 events), Weaver/Poje 26 (2), Nelli Zhiganshina/Alexander Gazsi (GER) 18 (2), Tessa Virtue/Scott Moir (CAN), Meryl Davis/Charlie White (USA) & Ekaterina Bobrova/Dmitri Soloviev (RUS) 15 (1).
    - Pairs: (gold) Yuko Kavaguti/Alexander Smirnov (RUS) 177.51 points (silver) Narumi Takahashi/Mervin Tran (JPN) 172.09 (bronze) Aliona Savchenko/Robin Szolkowy (GER) 171.68
      - Standings (after 4 of 6 events): Kavaguti/Smirnov 30 points (2 events), Savchenko/Szolkowy & Zhang Dan/Zhang Hao (CHN) 26 (2), Takahashi/Tran & Kirsten Moore-Towers/Dylan Moscovitch (CAN) 22 (2), Sui Wenjing/Han Cong (CHN) 20 (2).
    - Ladies: (gold) Akiko Suzuki (JPN) 185.98 points (silver) Mao Asada (JPN) 184.19 (bronze) Alena Leonova (RUS) 170.68
      - Standings (after 4 of 6 events): Carolina Kostner (ITA) & Suzuki 28 points (2 events), Mirai Nagasu (USA), Ashley Wagner (USA) & Leonova 20 (2), Alissa Czisny (USA) & Elizaveta Tuktamysheva (RUS) 15 (1).

==== Football (soccer) ====
- 2014 FIFA World Cup qualification (CAF) First round, first leg: Somalia 0–0 Ethiopia in Djibouti
- Friendly international (top 10 in FIFA World Rankings): (7) England 1–0 (1) Spain
- CAF Champions League Final second leg (first leg score in parentheses): **Espérance ST** (Tunisia) 1–0 (0–0) (Morocco) Wydad Casablanca
  - Espérance ST win the title for the second time, and qualify for the Club World Cup.

==== Mixed martial arts ====
- UFC on Fox: Velasquez vs. Dos Santos in Anaheim, California, United States:
  - Heavyweight Championship bout: **Junior dos Santos** (BRA) def. Cain Velasquez (USA) (c) via KO (punches)

==== Rugby league ====
- Four Nations in England and Wales (teams in **bold** advance to the Final):
  - Round three in Hull: **England** 28–6 New Zealand
    - Standings: England 4 points (3 matches), **Australia** 4 (2), New Zealand 2 (3), Wales 0 (2).

==== Rugby union ====
- Heineken Cup pool stage Matchday 1:
  - Pool 1:
    - Scarlets (Wales) 31–23 (France) Castres
    - Munster (Ireland) 23–21 (England) Northampton Saints
  - Pool 2: London Irish (England) 19–20 (Scotland) Edinburgh
  - Pool 3: Montpellier (France) 16–16 (Ireland) Leinster
  - Pool 4:
    - Aironi (Italy) 12–28 (England) Leicester Tigers
    - Ulster (Ireland) 16–11 (France) Clermont
  - Pool 5: Ospreys (Wales) 28–21 (France) Biarritz
- Amlin Challenge Cup pool stage Matchday 1:
  - Pool 2: Newcastle Falcons (England) 27–19 (France) Lyon
  - Pool 3:
    - Rugby Rovigo (Italy) 10–43 (France) Bayonne
    - Bordeaux-Bègles (France) 14–47 (England) London Wasps
  - Pool 4: Cavalieri Prato (Italy) 3–33 (Wales) Newport Gwent Dragons
  - Pool 5:
    - La Vila (Spain) 10–50 (France) Agen
    - Brive (France) 26–18 (England) Sale Sharks

==== Volleyball ====
- FIVB Women's World Cup in Japan, Matchday 7:
  - Italy 3–0 Brazil
  - China 3–1 Serbia
  - Japan 3–0 South Korea
  - Dominican Republic 3–2 Germany
  - Argentina 3–0 Kenya
  - Algeria 0–3 United States
    - Standings (after 7 matches): Italy 20 points, United States 18, China 16, Germany 15, Japan 13, Brazil 12, Serbia 11, Argentina 9, Dominican Republic 8, South Korea 4, Kenya, Algeria 0.

==== Weightlifting ====
- World Championships in Paris, France:
  - Men's 94 kg:
    - Snatch: (gold) Aleksandr Ivanov (RUS) 186 kg (silver) Artem Ivanov (UKR) 186 kg (bronze) Kim Min-Jae (KOR) 182 kg
    - Clean & Jerk: (gold) Ilya Ilin (KAZ) 226 kg (silver) Ruslan Nurudinov (UZB) 221 kg (bronze) Saeid Mohammadpour (IRN) 221 kg
    - Total: (gold) Ilin 407 kg (silver) Artem Ivanov 407 kg (bronze) Mohammadpour 402 kg
  - Men's 105 kg:
    - Snatch: (gold) Khadzhimurat Akkayev (RUS) 198 kg (silver) Dmitry Klokov (RUS) 196 kg (bronze) Gia Machavariani (GEO) 187 kg
    - Clean & Jerk: (gold) Akkayev 232 kg (silver) Klokov 232 kg (bronze) Oleksiy Torokhtiy (UKR) 229 kg
    - Total: (gold) Akkayev 430 kg (silver) Klokov 428 kg (bronze) Torokhtiy 410 kg

=== November 11, 2011 (Friday) ===
==== Cricket ====
- Australia in South Africa:
  - 1st Test in Cape Town, day 3: Australia 284 & 47; South Africa 96 & 236/2 (50.2 overs; Hashim Amla 112, Graeme Smith 101*). **South Africa win by 8 wickets; lead 2-match series 1–0.**
- Pakistan vs Sri Lanka in UAE:
  - 1st ODI in Dubai: Sri Lanka 131 (40.3 overs); Pakistan 132/2 (21.5 overs). **Pakistan win by 8 wickets; lead 5-match series 1–0.**

==== Football (soccer) ====
- UEFA Euro 2012 Qualifying play-offs, first leg:
  - Bosnia and Herzegovina 0–0 Portugal
  - Turkey 0–3 Croatia
  - Czech Republic 2–0 Montenegro
  - Estonia 0–4 Republic of Ireland
- 2014 FIFA World Cup qualification (CONMEBOL) Matchday 3:
  - Argentina 1–1 Bolivia
  - Uruguay 4–0 Chile
  - Colombia 1–1 Venezuela
  - Paraguay 2–1 Ecuador
    - Standings (after 3 matches unless stated): Uruguay 7 points, Argentina 4, Colombia 4 (2), Paraguay, Venezuela 4, Ecuador, Peru 3 (2), Chile 3, Bolivia 1.
- 2014 FIFA World Cup qualification (CAF) First round, first leg:
  - Djibouti 0–4 Namibia
  - Comoros 0–1 Mozambique
  - São Tomé and Príncipe 0–5 Congo
  - Eritrea 1–1 Rwanda
  - Chad 1–2 Tanzania
  - Equatorial Guinea 2–0 Madagascar
  - Seychelles 0–3 Kenya
  - Guinea-Bissau 1–1 Togo
  - Mauritius – **Liberia**. Liberia advance to the Second round due to Mauritius' withdrawal.
  - Swaziland 1–3 DR Congo
  - Lesotho 1–0 Burundi
- 2014 FIFA World Cup qualification (AFC) Third round, matchday 4 (teams in **bold** advance to the fourth round):
  - Group A:
    - Iraq 1–0 China
    - **Jordan** 2–0 Singapore
      - Standings (after 4 matches): Jordan 12 points, Iraq 9, China PR 3, Singapore 0.
  - Group B:
    - United Arab Emirates 0–2 South Korea
    - Kuwait 0–1 Lebanon
      - Standings (after 4 matches): South Korea 10 points, Lebanon 7, Kuwait 5, United Arab Emirates 0.
  - Group C:
    - Tajikistan 0–4 **Japan**
    - **Uzbekistan** 1–0 North Korea
      - Standings (after 4 matches): Japan, Uzbekistan 10 points, North Korea 3, Tajikistan 0.
  - Group D:
    - Oman 1–0 Australia
    - Saudi Arabia 3–0 Thailand
      - Standings (after 4 matches): Australia 9 points, Saudi Arabia 5, Thailand, Oman 4.
  - Group E:
    - Bahrain 1–1 Iran
    - Qatar 4–0 Indonesia
      - Standings (after 4 matches): Iran, Qatar 8 points, Bahrain 5, Indonesia 0.
- 2014 FIFA World Cup qualification (CONCACAF) Second round, matchday 5 (teams in **bold** advance to the Third round):
  - Group A:
    - Dominican Republic 4–0 Cayman Islands
    - Suriname 1–3 **El Salvador**
      - Standings (after 5 matches): El Salvador 15 points, Dominican Republic, Suriname 7, Cayman Islands 0.
  - Group B:
    - Bermuda 2–1 Barbados
    - **Guyana** 2–1 Trinidad and Tobago
      - Standings (after 5 matches): Guyana 13 points, Trinidad and Tobago 9, Bermuda 7, Barbados 0.
  - Group C: Nicaragua 1–0 Dominica
    - Standings: **Panama** 9 points (3 matches), Nicaragua 6 (4), Dominica 0 (3).
  - Group D:
    - Saint Kitts and Nevis 0–0 **Canada**
    - Saint Lucia 0–4 Puerto Rico
      - Standings (after 5 matches): Canada 11 points, Saint Kitts and Nevis 7, Puerto Rico 6, Saint Lucia 1.
  - Group E:
    - Belize 1–1 Saint Vincent and the Grenadines
    - **Guatemala** 3–0 Grenada
      - Standings (after 5 matches): Guatemala 15 points, Saint Vincent and the Grenadines 5, Belize, Grenada 4.
  - Group F:
    - U.S. Virgin Islands 0–3 Curaçao
    - **Antigua and Barbuda** 1–0 Haiti
      - Standings (after 5 matches): Antigua and Barbuda 15 points, Haiti 10, Curaçao 4, U.S. Virgin Islands 0.
- Friendly internationals (top 10 in FIFA World Rankings):
  - (2) Netherlands 0–0 Switzerland
  - Ukraine 3–3 (3) Germany
  - Poland 0–2 (6) Italy
  - (8) Greece 1–1 Russia
  - (10) Denmark 2–0 Sweden

==== Rugby union ====
- Heineken Cup pool stage Matchday 1:
  - Pool 2: Racing Métro (France) 20–26 (Wales) Cardiff Blues
  - Pool 6: Harlequins (England) 25–17 (Ireland) Connacht
- Amlin Challenge Cup pool stage Matchday 1:
  - Pool 4: Perpignan (France) 15–12 (England) Exeter Chiefs

==== Volleyball ====
- FIVB Women's World Cup in Japan, Matchday 6:
  - Italy 3–0 South Korea
  - China 2–3 Brazil
  - Japan 0–3 Serbia
  - Dominican Republic 3–1 Kenya
  - Algeria 0–3 Germany
  - Argentina 0–3 United States
    - Standings (after 6 matches): Italy 17 points, United States 15, Germany 14, China 13, Brazil 12, Serbia 11, Japan 10, Dominican Republic, Argentina 6, South Korea 4, Kenya, Algeria 0.

==== Weightlifting ====
- World Championships in Paris, France:
  - Men's 85 kg:
    - Snatch: (gold) Andrei Rybakou (BLR) 178 kg (silver) Adrian Zieliński (POL) 174 kg (bronze) Kianoush Rostami (IRN) 173 kg
    - Clean & Jerk: (gold) Rostami 209 kg (silver) Benjamin Hennequin (FRA) 208 kg (bronze) Yoelmis Hernández (CUB) 205 kg
    - Total: (gold) Rostami 382 kg (silver) Hennequin 378 kg (bronze) Zieliński 376 kg

=== November 10, 2011 (Thursday) ===
==== Basketball ====
- Euroleague Regular Season Matchday 4:
  - Group A: SLUC Nancy (France) 90–85 (Spain) Caja Laboral
    - Standings: Caja Laboral, (Italy) Bennet Cantù 3–1, SLUC Nancy, (Turkey) Fenerbahçe Ülker 2–2, (Spain) Bizkaia Bilbao Basket, (Greece) Olympiacos 1–3.
  - Group B:
    - Žalgiris Kaunas (Lithuania) 81–70 (Germany) Brose Baskets
    - Panathinaikos (Greece) 76–78 (OT) (Russia) CSKA Moscow
      - Standings: CSKA Moscow 4–0, Panathinaikos, (Spain) Unicaja 3–1, Brose Baskets, Žalgiris Kaunas 1–3, (Croatia) KK Zagreb 0–4.
  - Group C:
    - Anadolu Efes (Turkey) 72–79 (Israel) Maccabi Tel Aviv
    - Spirou Charleroi (Belgium) 76–81 (Italy) EA7 Emporio Armani
    - Partizan Mt:s Belgrade (Serbia) 80–79 (Spain) Real Madrid
      - Standings: Maccabi Tel Aviv 3–1, Real Madrid, Anadolu Efes, EA7 Emporio Armani, Partizan Mt:s Belgrade 2–2, Spirou Charleroi 1–3.
  - Group D: FC Barcelona Regal (Spain) 92–75 (Italy) Montepaschi Siena
    - Standings: FC Barcelona Regal 4–0, Montepaschi Siena 3–1, (Turkey) Galatasaray Medical Park, (Russia) UNICS Kazan 2–2, (Slovenia) Union Olimpija Ljubljana 1–3, (Poland) Asseco Prokom Gdynia 0–4.

==== Cricket ====
- Australia in South Africa:
  - 1st Test in Cape Town, day 2: Australia 284 (75 overs; Michael Clarke 151) & 47 (18 overs; Vernon Philander 5/15); South Africa 96 (24.3 overs; Shane Watson 5/17) & 81/1 (17 overs). South Africa require another 155 runs with 9 wickets remaining.
    - Australia record their lowest complete innings total since 1902.
    - 23 wickets fall during the day, the most in a day since 1902.

==== Football (soccer) ====
- Friendly international (top 10 in FIFA World Rankings): Gabon 0–2 (5) Brazil
- UEFA Women's Champions League Round of 16 second leg (first leg scores in parentheses):
  - **LdB Malmö** (Sweden) 1–0 (3–1) (Austria) SV Neulengbach. LdB Malmö win 4–1 on aggregate.
  - **Göteborg FC** (Sweden) 3–2 (1–0) (Denmark) Fortuna Hjørring. Göteborg FC win 4–2 on aggregate.
  - Glasgow City (Scotland) 0–7 (0–10) (Germany) **Turbine Potsdam**. Turbine Potsdam win 17–0 on aggregate.
- Copa Sudamericana Quarterfinals second leg (first leg score in parentheses): **Vélez Sársfield** (Argentina) 3–2 (1–1) (Colombia) Santa Fe. Vélez Sársfield win 4–1 on points.

==== Rugby union ====
- Amlin Challenge Cup pool stage Matchday 1:
  - Pool 1: Worcester Warriors (England) 14–23 (France) Stade Français
  - Pool 2: Toulon (France) 53–22 (Italy) Petrarca Padova

==== Weightlifting ====
- World Championships in Paris, France:
  - Men's 77 kg:
    - Snatch: (gold) Lü Xiaojun (CHN) 170 kg (silver) Su Dajin (CHN) 166 kg (bronze) Tigran Gevorg Martirosyan (ARM) 166 kg
    - Clean & Jerk: (gold) Su 206 kg (silver) Lu 205 kg (bronze) Sa Jae-Hyouk (KOR) 203 kg
    - Total: (gold) Lu 375 kg (silver) Su 372 kg (bronze) Sa 360 kg
      - Lu wins the title for the second time.
  - Women's 75 kg:
    - Snatch: (gold) Svetlana Podobedova (KAZ) 131 kg (silver) Nadezhda Yevstyukhina (RUS) 130 kg (bronze) Iryna Kulesha (BLR) 121 kg
    - Clean & Jerk: (gold) Yevstyukhina 163 kg (WR) (silver) Podobedova 156 kg (bronze) Kim Un-Ju (PRK) 151 kg
    - Total: (gold) Yevstyukhina 293 kg (silver) Podobedova 287 kg (bronze) Kim 265 kg

=== November 9, 2011 (Wednesday) ===
==== Basketball ====
- Euroleague Regular Season Matchday 4:
  - Group A:
    - Bennet Cantù (Italy) 64–63 (Greece) Olympiacos
    - Bizkaia Bilbao Basket (Spain) 70–73 (Turkey) Fenerbahçe Ülker
      - Standings: (Spain) Caja Laboral 3–0, Bennet Cantù 3–1, Fenerbahçe Ülker 2–2, (France) SLUC Nancy 1–2, Bizkaia Bilbao Basket, Olympiacos 1–3.
  - Group B: Unicaja (Spain) 99–85 (Croatia) KK Zagreb
    - Standings: (Russia) CSKA Moscow, (Greece) Panathinaikos 3–0, Unicaja 3–1, (Germany) Brose Baskets 1–2, (Lithuania) Žalgiris Kaunas 0–3, KK Zagreb 0–4.
  - Group D:
    - Union Olimpija Ljubljana (Slovenia) 70–79 (Turkey) Galatasaray Medical Park
    - Asseco Prokom Gdynia (Poland) 68–72 (Russia) UNICS Kazan
      - Standings: (Spain) FC Barcelona Regal, (Italy) Montepaschi Siena 3–0, Galatasaray Medical Park, UNICS Kazan 2–2, Union Olimpija Ljubljana 1–3, Asseco Prokom Gdynia 0–4.

==== College football ====
- The Penn State Board of Trustees fires head coach Joe Paterno after 46 years in charge, over his alleged knowledge of the Penn State child sex abuse scandal.

==== Cricket ====
- West Indies in India:
  - 1st Test in Delhi, day 4: West Indies 304 & 180; India 209 & 276/5 (80.4 overs). **India win by 5 wickets; lead 3-match series 1–0.**
- Australia in South Africa:
  - 1st Test in Cape Town, day 1: Australia 214/8 (55 overs; Michael Clarke 107*); South Africa.

==== Football (soccer) ====
- UEFA Women's Champions League Round of 16 second leg (first leg scores in parentheses):
  - **Arsenal** (England) 5–1 (1–1) (Spain) Rayo Vallecano. Arsenal win 6–2 on aggregate.
  - **WFC Rossiyanka** (Russia) 3–3 (4–0) (Russia) FC Energy Voronezh. Rossiyanka win 7–3 on aggregate.
  - **Olympique Lyon** (France) 6–0 (6–0) (Czech Republic) Sparta Praha. Lyon win 12–0 on aggregate.
  - Torres (Italy) 1–3 (1–2) (Denmark) **Brøndby IF**. Brøndby IF win 5–2 on aggregate.
  - Paris Saint-Germain (France) 2–1 (0–3) (Germany) **1. FFC Frankfurt**. 1. FFC Frankfurt win 4–2 on aggregate.
- Copa Sudamericana Quarterfinals second leg (first leg score in parentheses): **Vasco da Gama** (Brazil) 5–2 (0–2) (Peru) Universitario. 3–3 on points; Vasco da Gama win 5–4 on aggregate.

==== Volleyball ====
- FIVB Women's World Cup in Japan, Matchday 5:
  - Argentina 0–3 China
  - Algeria 0–3 Italy
  - Dominican Republic 0–3 Japan
  - Kenya 0–3 South Korea
  - Brazil 3–2 Serbia
  - Germany 3–0 United States
    - Standings (after 5 matches): Italy 14 points, United States, China 12, Germany 11, Brazil, Japan 10, Serbia 8, Argentina 6, South Korea 4, Dominican Republic 3, Kenya, Algeria 0.

==== Weightlifting ====
- World Championships in Paris, France:
  - Women's 69 kg:
    - Snatch: (gold) Oksana Slivenko (RUS) 118 kg (silver) Xiang Yanmei (CHN) 116 kg (bronze) Huang Shih-hsu (TPE) 116 kg
    - Clean & Jerk: (gold) Slivenko 148 kg (silver) Xiang 148 kg (bronze) Tatiana Matveyeva (RUS) 143 kg
    - Total: (gold) Slivenko 266 kg (silver) Xiang 264 kg (bronze) Matveyeva 253 kg
      - Slivenko wins the title for the third time.

=== November 8, 2011 (Tuesday) ===
==== Cricket ====
- West Indies in India:
  - 1st Test in Delhi, day 3: West Indies 304 & 180 (57.3 overs; Ravichandran Ashwin 6/47); India 209 & 152/2 (44 overs). India require another 124 runs with 8 wickets remaining.

==== Volleyball ====
- FIVB Women's World Cup in Japan, Matchday 4:
  - China 3–1 Dominican Republic
  - Italy 3–0 Argentina
  - Japan 3–0 Algeria
  - United States 3–0 Kenya
  - South Korea 2–3 Brazil
  - Serbia 2–3 Germany
    - Standings (after 4 matches): United States 12 points, Italy 11, China 9, Germany, Brazil 8, Japan, Serbia 7, Argentina 6, Dominican Republic 3, South Korea 1, Kenya, Algeria 0.

==== Weightlifting ====
- World Championships in Paris, France:
  - Men's 69 kg:
    - Snatch: (gold) Mete Binay (TUR) 157 kg (silver) Oleg Chen (RUS) 156 kg (bronze) Tang Deshang (CHN) 155 kg
    - Clean & Jerk: (gold) Tang 186 kg (silver) Wu Chao (CHN) 185 kg (bronze) Won Jeong-Sik (KOR) 182 kg
    - Total: (gold) Tang 341 kg (silver) Chen 336 kg (bronze) Wu 335 kg
  - Women's 63 kg:
    - Snatch: (gold) Svetlana Tsarukayeva (RUS) 117 kg (WR) (silver) Ouyang Xiaofang (CHN) 113 kg (bronze) Maiya Maneza (KAZ) 109 kg
    - Clean & Jerk: (gold) Maneza 139 kg (silver) Tsarukayeva 138 kg (bronze) Roxana Cocoş (ROM) 136 kg
    - Total: (gold) Tsarukayeva 255 kg (silver) Maneza 248 kg (bronze) Ouyang 246 kg

=== November 7, 2011 (Monday) ===
==== Cricket ====
- Pakistan vs Sri Lanka in UAE:
  - 3rd Test in Sharjah, day 5: Sri Lanka 413 & 181/6d (58 overs); Pakistan 340 & 87/4 (57 overs). **Match drawn; Pakistan win the 3-match series 1–0**.
- West Indies in India:
  - 1st Test in Delhi, day 2: West Indies 304 (108.2 overs; Shivnarine Chanderpaul 118, Pragyan Ojha 6/72) & 21/2 (14 overs); India 209 (52.5 overs). West Indies lead by 116 runs with 8 wickets remaining.

==== Surfing ====
- Men's World Tour:
  - Rip Curl Search in San Francisco, United States: (1) Gabriel Medina (BRA) (2) Joel Parkinson (AUS) (3) Taylor Knox (USA) & Alejo Muniz (BRA)
    - Standings (after 10 of 11 events): (1) Kelly Slater (USA) 63,350 points (2) Parkinson 48,600 (3) Owen Wright (AUS) 47,900
      - Slater wins the title for the 11th time.

==== Weightlifting ====
- World Championships in Paris, France:
  - Women's 58 kg:
    - Snatch: (gold) Li Xueying (CHN) 103 kg (silver) Nastassia Novikava (BLR) 101 kg (bronze) Romela Begaj (ALB) 100 kg
    - Clean & Jerk: (gold) Novikava 136 kg (silver) Li 133 kg (bronze) Pimsiri Sirikaew (THA) 131 kg
    - Total: (gold) Novikava 237 kg (silver) Li 236 kg (bronze) Sirikaew 230 kg

=== November 6, 2011 (Sunday) ===
==== Athletics ====
- World Marathon Majors:
  - New York City Marathon (KEN unless stated):
    - Men: (gold) Geoffrey Mutai 2:05:06 (Course record) (silver) Emmanuel Kipchirchir Mutai 2:06:28 (bronze) Tsegaye Kebede (ETH) 2:07:13
    - Women: (gold) Firehiwot Dado (ETH) 2:23:15 (silver) Bizunesh Deba (ETH) 2:23:19 (bronze) Mary Jepkosgei Keitany 2:23:38
  - Final World Marathon Majors standings:
    - Men: (1) Emmanuel Mutai 70 points (2) Geoffrey Mutai 65 (3) Patrick Makau Musyoki 60
    - Women: (1) Liliya Shobukhova (RUS) 90 points (2) Edna Kiplagat 60 (3) Keitany 45

==== Auto racing ====
- Sprint Cup Series – Chase for the Sprint Cup:
  - AAA Texas 500 in Fort Worth, Texas: (1) (Indiana) Tony Stewart (Chevrolet; Stewart Haas Racing) (2) (Missouri) Carl Edwards (Ford; Roush Fenway Racing) (3) (Washington (state)) Kasey Kahne (Toyota; Red Bull Racing Team)
    - Drivers' championship standings (after 34 of 36 races): (1) Edwards 2316 points (2) Stewart 2313 (3) (California) Kevin Harvick (Chevrolet; Richard Childress Racing) 2283
- World Touring Car Championship:
  - Race of China in Shanghai:
    - Race 1: (1) Alain Menu (SUI) (Chevrolet; Chevrolet Cruze) (2) Colin Turkington (GBR) (Wiechers-Sport; BMW 320 TC) (3) Robert Huff (GBR) (Chevrolet; Chevrolet Cruze)
    - Race 2: (1) Yvan Muller (FRA) (Chevrolet; Chevrolet Cruze) (2) Gabriele Tarquini (ITA) (Lukoil – SUNRED; SEAT León) (3) Huff
      - Drivers' championship standings (after 11 of 12 rounds): (1) Muller 400 points (2) Huff 380 (3) Menu 323

==== Badminton ====
- World Junior Championships in Taipei, Chinese Taipei:
  - Boys singles: **Zulfadli Zulkiffli** (MAS) def. Viktor Axelsen (DEN) 21–18, 9–21, 21–19
  - Girls singles: **Ratchanok Inthanon** (THA) def. Elyzabeth Purwaningtyas (INA) 21–6, 18–21, 21–13
  - Boys doubles: **Nelson Heg Wei Keat**/**Teo Ee Yi** (MAS) def. Huang Po Jui/Lin Chia Yu (TPE) 21–17, 21–17
  - Girls doubles: **Lee So Hee**/**Shin Seung Chan** (KOR) def. Shella Devi Aulia/Anggia Shitta Awanda (INA) 21–16, 13–21, 21–9
  - Mixed doubles: **Alfian Eko Prasetya**/**Gloria Widjaja** (INA) def. Ronald Alexander/Tiara Rosalia Nuraidah (INA) 12–21, 21–17, 25–23

==== Baseball ====
- Nippon Professional Baseball Climax Series:
  - Central League Final Stage, Game 5 in Nagoya: Chunichi Dragons 2, Tokyo Yakult Swallows 1. **Dragons win series 4–2.**
    - The Dragons advance to the Japan Series for the second successive year. Dragons starting pitcher Kazuki Yoshimi is named stage MVP.

==== Cricket ====
- Pakistan vs Sri Lanka in UAE:
  - 3rd Test in Sharjah, day 4: Sri Lanka 413 & 164/5 (53.4 overs); Pakistan 340 (138.2 overs; Chanaka Welegedara 5/87). Sri Lanka lead by 237 runs with 5 wickets remaining.
- West Indies in India:
  - 1st Test in Delhi, day 1: West Indies 256/5 (91 overs; Shivnarine Chanderpaul 111*); India.

==== Cue sports ====
- World Seniors Championship in Peterborough, England:
  - Quarter-finals:
    - Dene O'Kane (NZL) 0–2 **Steve Davis** (ENG)
    - **Darren Morgan** (WAL) 2–0 Cliff Thorburn (CAN)
    - Dennis Taylor (NIR) 0–2 **Jimmy White** (ENG)
    - **John Parrott** (ENG) 2–1 Karl Townsend (ENG)
  - Semi-finals:
    - **Davis** 2–0 Parrott
    - White 0–2 **Morgan**
  - Final: Davis 1–2 **Morgan**
    - Morgan wins the title for the first time.

==== Football (soccer) ====
- CAF Champions League Final first leg: Wydad Casablanca (Morocco) 0–0 (Tunisia) Espérance ST
- (United States) MLS Cup Playoffs Conference finals:
  - Eastern Conference: Sporting Kansas City 0–2 **Houston Dynamo**
  - Western Conference: **Los Angeles Galaxy** 3–1 Real Salt Lake
- (Norway) Norwegian Cup Final in Oslo: Brann 1–2 **Aalesund**
  - Aalesund win the Cup for the second time.
- (Republic of Ireland) FAI Cup Final in Dublin: Shelbourne 1–1 (1–4 pen.) **Sligo Rovers**
  - Sligo Rovers win the Cup for the second successive time and fourth time overall.

==== Golf ====
- World Golf Championships:
  - WGC-HSBC Champions in Shanghai, China:
    - Winner: Martin Kaymer (GER) 268 (−20)
      - Kaymer wins his tenth European Tour title.
- LPGA Tour:
  - Mizuno Classic in Shima, Mie, Japan:
    - Winner: Momoko Ueda (JPN) 200 (−16)^{PO}
      - Ueda defeats Feng Shanshan (CHN) on the third playoff hole, to win her second LPGA Tour title.
- Champions Tour:
  - Charles Schwab Cup Championship in San Francisco:
    - Winner: Jay Don Blake (USA) 276 (−8)
      - Blake wins his second Champions Tour title.

==== Motorcycle racing ====
- Moto GP:
  - Valencian Grand Prix in Cheste, Spain:
    - MotoGP: (1) Casey Stoner (AUS) (Honda) (2) Ben Spies (USA) (Yamaha) (3) Andrea Dovizioso (ITA) (Honda)
      - Final riders' championship standings: (1) Stoner 350 points (2) Jorge Lorenzo (ESP) (Yamaha) 260 (3) Dovizioso 228
    - Moto2: (1) Michele Pirro (ITA) (Moriwaki) (2) Mika Kallio (FIN) (Suter) (3) Dominique Aegerter (SUI) (Suter)
      - Final riders' championship standings: (1) Stefan Bradl (GER) 274 points (2) Marc Márquez (ESP) (Suter) 251 (3) Andrea Iannone (ITA) (Suter) 177
        - Bradl becomes Germany's first World Champion in any class since Dirk Raudies in 1993.
    - 125cc (all ESP, Aprilia): (1) Maverick Viñales (2) Nicolás Terol (3) Héctor Faubel
      - Final riders' championship standings: (1) Terol 302 points (2) Johann Zarco (FRA) (Derbi) 262 (3) Viñales 248
        - Terol becomes the final 125cc World Champion.

==== Tennis ====
- Fed Cup World Group Final in Moscow, day 2: Russia 2–3 **Czech Republic**
  - Petra Kvitová (CZE) def. Svetlana Kuznetsova (RUS) 4–6, 6–2, 6–3
  - Anastasia Pavlyuchenkova (RUS) def. Lucie Šafářová (CZE) 6–2, 6–4
  - Lucie Hradecká/Květa Peschke (CZE) def. Maria Kirilenko/Elena Vesnina (RUS) 6–4, 6–2
    - The Czech Republic win the title for the first time as a separate nation.
- ATP World Tour:
  - Valencia Open 500 in Valencia, Spain:
    - Final: **Marcel Granollers** (ESP) def. Juan Mónaco (ARG) 6–2, 4–6, 7–6(3)
      - Granollers wins his third ATP Tour title.
  - Swiss Indoors in Basel, Switzerland:
    - Final: **Roger Federer** (SUI) def. Kei Nishikori (JPN) 6–1, 6–3
      - Federer wins the title for the fifth time in six years, and his 68th ATP Tour title overall.
- WTA Tour:
  - Commonwealth Bank Tournament of Champions in Bali, Indonesia:
    - Final: **Ana Ivanovic** (SRB) def. Anabel Medina Garrigues (ESP) 6–3, 6–0
      - Ivanovic defends her title, to win her eleventh WTA Tour title.

==== Volleyball ====
- FIVB Women's World Cup in Japan, Matchday 3:
  - Dominican Republic 0–3 Italy
  - Argentina 3–1 Algeria
  - China 3–2 Japan
  - Kenya 1–3 Serbia
  - Germany 1–3 Brazil
  - United States 3–0 South Korea
    - Standings (after 3 matches): United States 9 points, Italy 8, Argentina, Brazil, China, Germany, Serbia 6, Japan 4, Dominican Republic 3, South Korea, Algeria, Kenya 0.

==== Weightlifting ====
- World Championships in Paris, France:
  - Men's 62 kg:
    - Snatch: (gold) Kim Un-Guk (PRK) 150 kg (silver) Zhang Jie (CHN) 145 kg (bronze) Bünyamin Sezer (TUR) 141 kg
    - Clean & Jerk: (gold) Zhang 176 kg (silver) Eko Yuli Irawan (INA) 171 kg (bronze) Kim 170 kg
    - Total: (gold) Zhang 321 kg (silver) Kim 320 kg (bronze) Irawan 310 kg
  - Women's 53 kg:
    - Snatch: (gold) Zulfiya Chinshanlo (KAZ) 97 kg (silver) Yudelquis Contreras (DOM) 95 kg (bronze) Hsu Shu-ching (TPE) 93 kg
    - Clean & Jerk: (gold) Chinshanlo 130 kg (WR) (silver) Aylin Daşdelen (TUR) 126 kg (bronze) Ji Jing (CHN) 121 kg
    - Total: (gold) Chinshanlo 227 kg (silver) Daşdelen 219 kg (bronze) Ji 214 kg
      - Chinshanlo wins the title for the second time.

=== November 5, 2011 (Saturday) ===
==== Auto racing ====
- Nationwide Series:
  - O'Reilly Auto Parts Challenge in Fort Worth, Texas: (1) (Tennessee) Trevor Bayne (Ford; Roush Fenway Racing) (2) (Virginia) Denny Hamlin (Toyota; Joe Gibbs Racing) (3) (Missouri) Carl Edwards (Ford; Roush Fenway Racing)
    - Drivers' championship standings (after 32 of 34 races): (1) (Mississippi) Ricky Stenhouse Jr. (Ford; Roush Fenway Racing) 1138 points (2) (Virginia) Elliott Sadler (Chevrolet; Kevin Harvick Incorporated) 1121 (3) (Illinois) Justin Allgaier (Chevrolet; Turner Motorsports) & (Florida) Aric Almirola (Chevrolet; JR Motorsports) 1039

==== Baseball ====
- Nippon Professional Baseball Climax Series:
  - Central League Final Stage, Game 4 in Nagoya: Chunichi Dragons 5, Tokyo Yakult Swallows 1. Dragons lead series 3–2.
  - Pacific League Final Stage, Game 3 in Fukuoka: Fukuoka SoftBank Hawks 2, Saitama Seibu Lions 1 (F/12). **Hawks win series 4–0.**
    - The Hawks advance to the Japan Series for the first time since 2003. Hawks outfielder Seiichi Uchikawa is named stage MVP.

==== Cricket ====
- New Zealand in Zimbabwe:
  - Only Test in Bulawayo, day 5: New Zealand 426 & 252/8d; Zimbabwe 313 & 331 (108.1 overs, Brendan Taylor 117, Doug Bracewell 5/85). **New Zealand win by 34 runs**.
- Pakistan vs Sri Lanka in UAE:
  - 3rd Test in Sharjah, day 3: Sri Lanka 413; Pakistan 282/6 (110 overs, Younis Khan 122). Pakistan trail by 131 runs with 4 wickets remaining in the 1st innings.

==== Cue sports ====
- World Seniors Championship in Peterborough, England, last 16:
  - Tony Drago (MLT) 1–2 **Steve Davis** (ENG)
  - **Dene O'Kane** (NZL) 2–1 Neal Foulds (ENG)
  - **Karl Townsend** (ENG) 2–0 Steve Ventham (ENG)
  - **John Parrott** (ENG) 2–1 Joe Johnson (ENG)
  - **Jimmy White** (ENG) 2–0 Tony Knowles (ENG)
  - Nigel Bond (ENG) 0–2 **Dennis Taylor** (NIR)
  - Gary Wilkinson (ENG) 0–2 **Darren Morgan** (WAL)
  - **Cliff Thorburn** (CAN) 2–1 Doug Mountjoy (WAL)

==== Equestrianism ====
- Show jumping – World Cup, North American League East Coast:
  - 7th competition in Lexington KY (CSI 4*-W): (gold) Richard Spooner (USA) on Cristallo (silver) Nick Skelton (GBR) on Carlo (bronze) Jessica Springsteen (USA) on Cincinnati

==== Figure skating ====
- ISU Grand Prix:
  - Cup of China in Beijing, China:
    - Ice Dancing: (gold) Ekaterina Bobrova/Dmitri Soloviev (RUS) 163.52 points (silver) Maia Shibutani/Alex Shibutani (USA) 148.40 (bronze) Pernelle Carron/Lloyd Jones (FRA) 130.97
      - Standings (after 3 of 6 events): Tessa Virtue/Scott Moir (CAN), Meryl Davis/Charlie White (USA) & Bobrova/Soloviev 15 points (1 event), Nathalie Péchalat/Fabian Bourzat (FRA), Kaitlyn Weaver/Andrew Poje (CAN) & Shibutani/Shibutani 13 (1), Anna Cappellini/Luca Lanotte (ITA), Isabella Tobias/Deividas Stagniūnas (LTU) & Carron/Jones 11 (1).
    - Ladies: (gold) Carolina Kostner (ITA) 182.14 points (silver) Mirai Nagasu (USA) 173.22 (bronze) Adelina Sotnikova (RUS) 159.95
      - Standings (after 3 of 6 events): Kostner 28 points (2 events), Nagasu 20 (2), Alissa Czisny (USA) & Elizaveta Tuktamysheva (RUS) 15 (1), Akiko Suzuki (JPN) 13 (1), Viktoria Helgesson (SWE), Sotnikova & Ashley Wagner (USA) 11 (1).
    - Men: (gold) Jeremy Abbott (USA) 228.49 points (silver) Nobunari Oda (JPN) 227.11 (bronze) Song Nan (CHN) 226.75
      - Standings (after 3 of 6 events): Kevin van der Perren (BEL) 16 points (2 events), Patrick Chan (CAN), Abbott & Michal Březina (CZE) 15 (1), Richard Dornbush (USA) & Denis Ten (KAZ) 14 (2), Javier Fernández (ESP) & Oda 13 (1), Daisuke Takahashi (JPN), Song & Takahiko Kozuka (JPN) 11 (1).
    - Pairs: (gold) Yuko Kavaguti/Alexander Smirnov (RUS) 186.74 points (silver) Zhang Dan/Zhang Hao (CHN) 177.67 (bronze) Kirsten Moore-Towers/Dylan Moscovitch (CAN) 172.04
      - Standings (after 3 of 6 events): Zhang/Zhang 26 points (2 events), Moore-Towers/Moscovitch 22 (2), Sui Wenjing/Han Cong (CHN) 20 (2), Aliona Savchenko/Robin Szolkowy (GER), Tatiana Volosozhar/Maxim Trankov (RUS) & Kavaguti/Smirnov 15 (1), Meagan Duhamel/Eric Radford (CAN) 11 (1).

==== Football (soccer) ====
- AFC Champions League Final in Jeonju, South Korea: Jeonbuk Hyundai Motors 2–2 (2–4 pen.) (Qatar) **Al-Sadd**
  - Al-Sadd win the title for the second time, and qualify for the FIFA Club World Cup.
- (Sweden) Svenska Cupen Final in Helsingborg: **Helsingborgs IF** 3–1 Kalmar FF
  - Helsingborgs win the Cup for the fifth time.
- (Latvia) Higher League, matchday 32 (team in **bold** qualify for Champions League, teams in italics qualify for Europa League):
  - Gulbene 0–1 Liepājas
  - **Ventspils** 0–0 Skonto
    - Final standings: Ventspils 71 points, Liepājas 70, Daugava 63.
      - Ventspils win the title for the fourth time.

==== Horse racing ====
- Breeders' Cup in Louisville, Kentucky (jockey, trainer, USA unless stated):
  - Marathon: (gold) Afleet Again (Cornelio Velásquez (PAN), Robert Reid Jr.) (silver) Birdrun (bronze) Giant Oak
  - Juvenile Turf: (gold) Wrote (Ryan L. Moore (GBR), Aidan O'Brien (IRL)) (silver) Excaper (bronze) Farraaj
  - Dirt Sprint: (gold) Amazombie (Mike E. Smith, Bill Spawr) (silver) Force Freeze (bronze) Jackson Bend
  - Turf Sprint: (gold) Regally Ready (Corey Nakatani, Steve Asmussen) (silver) Country Day (bronze) Perfect Officer
  - Juvenile Dirt: (gold) Caleb's Posse (Rajiv Maragh, Donnie Von Hemel) (silver) Shackleford (bronze) Tres Borrachos
  - Turf Mile: (gold) St Nicholas Abbey (Joseph O'Brien (IRL), Aidan O'Brien) (silver) Sea Moon (bronze) Brilliant Speed
  - Dirt Mile: (gold) Hansen (Ramon A. Dominguez (VEN), Michael J. Maker) (silver) Union Rags (bronze) Creative Cause
  - Turf: (gold) Court Vision (Robby Albarado, Dale L. Romans) (silver) Turallure (bronze) Goldikova
  - Classic: (gold) Drosselmeyer (Smith, William I. Mott) (silver) Game On Dude (bronze) Ruler On Ice
    - Smith wins his 15th Breeders' Cup race, tying the record held by Jerry D. Bailey.

==== Korfball ====
- World Championship in Shaoxing, China:
  - Bronze medal match: (bronze) **Chinese Taipei** 33–16 Catalonia
  - Final: (gold) **Netherlands** 32–26 (silver) Belgium
    - The Netherlands win the title for the fifth successive time and eighth overall.

==== Mixed martial arts ====
- UFC 138 in Birmingham, England:
  - Lightweight bout: **Terry Etim** (ENG) def. Eddie Faaloloto (USA) via submission
  - Light Heavyweight bout: **Anthony Perosh** (AUS) def. Cyrille Diabaté (FRA) via submission
  - Welterweight bout: **Thiago Alves** (BRA) def. Papy Abedi (SWE) via submission
  - Bantamweight bout: **Renan Barão** (BRA) def. Brad Pickett (ENG) via submission
  - Middleweight bout: **Mark Muñoz** (USA) def. Chris Leben (USA) via TKO

==== Rugby league ====
- Four Nations in England and Wales:
  - Round two in London (team in **bold** qualify for Final):
    - Wales 0–36 New Zealand
    - England 20–36 **Australia**
      - Standings (after 2 matches): Australia 4 points, England, New Zealand 2, Wales 0.
- Autumn International Series in Limerick, Republic of Ireland: Ireland 16–34 France

==== Tennis ====
- Fed Cup World Group Final in Moscow, day 1: Russia 1–1 Czech Republic
  - Petra Kvitová (CZE) def. Maria Kirilenko (RUS) 6–2, 6–2
  - Svetlana Kuznetsova (RUS) def. Lucie Šafářová (CZE) 6–2, 6–3

==== Volleyball ====
- FIVB Women's World Cup in Japan, Matchday 2:
  - Algeria 0–3 Dominican Republic
  - Italy 3–2 China
  - Japan 3–0 Argentina
  - South Korea 0–3 Germany
  - Serbia 0–3 United States
  - Brazil 3–0 Kenya
    - Standings (after 2 matches): Germany, United States 6 points, Italy 5, China 4, Brazil, Dominican Republic, Japan, Serbia, Argentina 3, South Korea, Algeria, Kenya 0.

==== Weightlifting ====
- World Championships in Paris, France:
  - Men's 56 kg:
    - Snatch: (gold) Wu Jingbiao (CHN) 133 kg (silver) Zhao Chaojun (CHN) 128 kg (bronze) Khalil El-Maaoui (TUN) 127 kg
    - Clean & Jerk: (gold) Wu 159 kg (silver) Zhao 156 kg (bronze) Valentin Xristov (AZE) 154 kg
    - Total: (gold) Wu 292 kg (silver) Zhao 284 kg (bronze) Xristov 276 kg
      - Wu wins the title for the second time.
  - Women's 48 kg:
    - Snatch: (gold) Tian Yuan (CHN) 90 kg (silver) Genny Pagliaro (ITA) 83 kg (bronze) Marzena Karpińska (POL) 82 kg
    - Clean & Jerk: (gold) Tian 117 kg (silver) Panida Khamsri (THA) 107 kg (bronze) Nurdan Karagöz (TUR) 103 kg
    - Total: (gold) Tian (CHN) 207 kg (silver) Khamsri 187 kg (bronze) Karagöz 183 kg

=== November 4, 2011 (Friday) ===
==== Baseball ====
- Nippon Professional Baseball Climax Series:
  - Central League Final Stage, Game 3 in Nagoya: Tokyo Yakult Swallows 2, Chunichi Dragons 1. Series tied 2–2.
  - Pacific League Final Stage, Game 2 in Fukuoka: Fukuoka SoftBank Hawks 7, Saitama Seibu Lions 2. Hawks lead series 3–0.

==== Basketball ====
- Euroleague Regular Season Matchday 3:
  - Group B: Panathinaikos (Greece) 92–75 (Lithuania) Žalgiris
    - Standings: (Russia) CSKA Moscow, Panathinaikos 3–0, (Spain) Unicaja 2–1, (Germany) Brose Baskets 1–2, Žalgiris, (Croatia) KK Zagreb 0–3.

==== Cricket ====
- New Zealand in Zimbabwe:
  - Only Test in Bulawayo, day 4: New Zealand 426 & 252/8d (71 overs; Kyle Jarvis 5/64); Zimbabwe 313 & 61/2 (23.4 overs). Zimbabwe require another 305 runs with 8 wickets remaining.
- Pakistan vs Sri Lanka in UAE:
  - 3rd Test in Sharjah, day 2: Sri Lanka 413 (153.3 overs; Kumar Sangakkara 144); Pakistan 35/2 (20 overs). Pakistan trail by 378 runs with 8 wickets remaining in the 1st innings.

==== Cycling (track) ====
- Track Cycling World: Astana
  - Women's Team Sprint: (1) Germany, (2) France, (3)Great Britain
  - Men's Scratch Race: (1) Gijs Van Hoecke (BEL), (2) Ángel Colla (ARG), (3) Nikias Arndt (GER)
  - Women's Team Pursuit: (1) Netherlands (Ellen van Dijk, Kirsten Wild, Amy Pieters) (2) China (Fan Jiang, Wenwen Jiang, Jing Liang), (3) Germany (Lisa Brennauer, Charlotte Becker, Madeleine Sandig)
  - Men's Team Sprint: (1) Germany, (2) France, (3)Great Britain
  - Women's 500m Time Trial: (1) Olga Panarina (BLR), (2) Sandie Clair (FRA), (3) Miriam Welte (GER)
  - Women's Points Race: (1) Na Ah-reum (KOR), (2) Stephanie Pohl (GER), (3) Elena Cecchini (ITA)
  - Men's Team Pursuit: (1) Russia (Team RVL), (2) Australia, (3) Netherlands

==== Horse racing ====
- Breeders' Cup in Louisville, Kentucky (jockey, trainer, USA unless stated otherwise):
  - Juvenile Sprint: (gold) Secret Circle (Rafael Bejarano (PER), Bob Baffert) (silver) Shumoos (bronze) Holdin Bullets
  - Juvenile Fillies Turf: (gold) Stephanie's Kitten (John R. Velazquez (PUR), Wayne M. Catalano) (silver) Stopshoppingmaria (bronze) Sweet Cat
  - Filly & Mare Sprint: (gold) Musical Romance (Juan Leyva (MEX), William Kaplan) (silver) Switch (bronze) Her Smile
  - Juvenile Fillies Dirt: (gold) My Miss Aurelia (Corey Nakatani, Steve Asmussen) (silver) Grace Hall (bronze) Weemissfrankie
  - Filly & Mare Turf: (gold) Perfect Shirl (Velazquez, Roger Attfield (CAN)) (silver) Nahrain (bronze) Misty For Me
  - Ladies' Classic: (gold) Royal Delta (Jose Lezcano (PAN), William I. Mott) (silver) It's Tricky (bronze) Pachattack

==== Volleyball ====
- FIVB Women's World Cup in Japan, Matchday 1:
  - China 3–0 Algeria
  - Dominican Republic 1–3 Argentina
  - Italy 3–1 Japan
  - Serbia 3–0 South Korea
  - Kenya 0–3 Germany
  - United States 3–1 Brazil

=== November 3, 2011 (Thursday) ===
==== Baseball ====
- Nippon Professional Baseball Climax Series:
  - Central League Final Stage, Game 2 in Nagoya: Tokyo Yakult Swallows 3, Chunichi Dragons 1. Dragons lead series 2–1.
  - Pacific League Final Stage, Game 1 in Fukuoka: Fukuoka SoftBank Hawks 4, Saitama Seibu Lions 2. Hawks lead series 2–0.

==== Basketball ====
- Euroleague Regular Season Matchday 3:
  - Group A:
    - Fenerbahçe Ülker (Turkey) 90–86 (France) SLUC Nancy
    - Bennet Cantù (Italy) 78–69 (Spain) Bizkaia Bilbao
      - Standings: (Spain) Caja Laboral 3–0, Bennet Cantù 2–1, SLUC Nancy, Fenerbahçe Ülker, Bizkaia Bilbao, (Greece) Olympiacos 1–2.
  - Group B: Brose Baskets (Germany) 78–79 (Spain) Unicaja
    - Standings: (Russia) CSKA Moscow 3–0, (Greece) Panathinaikos 2–0, Unicaja 2–1, Brose Baskets 1–2, (Lithuania) Žalgiris Kaunas 0–2, (Croatia) KK Zagreb 0–3.
  - Group C:
    - Partizan Mt:s Belgrade (Serbia) 91–81 (Belgium) Spirou Charleroi
    - EA7 Emporio Armani (Italy) 54–62 (Turkey) Anadolu Efes
    - Maccabi Tel Aviv (Israel) 88–82 (Spain) Real Madrid
      - Standings: Real Madrid, Anadolu Efes, Maccabi Tel Aviv 2–1, Partizan Mt:s Belgrade, EA7 Emporio Armani, Spirou Charleroi 1–2.
  - Group D: UNICS Kazan (Russia) 65–93 (Spain) FC Barcelona Regal
    - Standings: FC Barcelona Regal, (Italy) Montepaschi Siena 3–0, FC Barcelona Regal 2–0, (Turkey) Galatasaray Medical Park, UNICS Kazan, (Slovenia) Union Olimpija Ljubljana 1–2, (Poland) Asseco Prokom Gdynia 0–3.

==== Cricket ====
- New Zealand in Zimbabwe:
  - Only Test in Bulawayo, day 3: New Zealand 426 & 28/2 (7 overs); Zimbabwe 313 (121.5 overs; Daniel Vettori 5/70). New Zealand lead by 141 runs with 8 wickets remaining.
- Pakistan vs Sri Lanka in UAE:
  - 3rd Test in Sharjah, day 1: Sri Lanka 245/2 (86 overs; Kumar Sangakkara 112*); Pakistan.
- Other news: Pakistan cricketers Salman Butt, Mohammad Asif and Mohammad Amir are jailed for between 6 and 30 months after being found guilty of conspiracy to cheat and conspiracy to accept corrupt payments, in relation to spot-fixing during the fourth Test against England, at Lord's in August 2010.

==== Football (soccer) ====
- UEFA Europa League group stage Matchday 4 (teams in **bold** qualify for Round of 32):
  - Group A:
    - Rubin Kazan (Russia) 1–0 (England) Tottenham Hotspur
    - Shamrock Rovers (Republic of Ireland) 1–3 (Greece) PAOK
      - Standings (after 4 matches): P.A.O.K. 8 points, Rubin Kazan, Tottenham Hotspur 7, Shamrock Rovers 0.
  - Group B:
    - Vorskla Poltava (Ukraine) 1–3 (Belgium) Standard Liège
    - Copenhagen (Denmark) 1–2 (Germany) Hannover 96
      - Standings (after 4 matches): Standard Liège, Hannover 96 8 points, Copenhagen 4, Vorskla Poltava 1.
  - Group C:
    - **Legia Warsaw** (Poland) 3–1 (Romania) Rapid București
    - **PSV Eindhoven** (Netherlands) 3–3 (Israel) Hapoel Tel Aviv
      - Standings (after 4 matches): PSV Eindhoven 10 points, Legia Warsaw 9, Rapid București 3, Hapoel Tel Aviv 1.
  - Group D:
    - Vaslui (Romania) 1–0 (Portugal) **Sporting CP**
    - Lazio (Italy) 1–0 (Switzerland) Zürich
      - Standings (after 4 matches): Sporting CP 9 points, Lazio, Vaslui 5, Zürich 2.
  - Group E:
    - Maccabi Tel Aviv (Israel) 1–2 (England) Stoke City
    - Beşiktaş (Turkey) 1–0 (Ukraine) Dynamo Kyiv
      - Standings (after 4 matches): Stoke City 10 points, Beşiktaş 6, Dynamo Kyiv 5, Maccabi Tel Aviv 1.
  - Group F:
    - Red Bull Salzburg (Austria) 0–1 (Spain) **Athletic Bilbao**
    - Paris Saint-Germain (France) 1–0 (Slovakia) Slovan Bratislava
      - Standings (after 4 matches): Athletic Bilbao 10 points, Paris Saint-Germain 7, Red Bull Salzburg 4, Slovan Bratislava 1.
  - Group G:
    - Metalist Kharkiv (Ukraine) 3–1 (Sweden) Malmö FF
    - Austria Wien 2–2 (Netherlands) AZ
      - Standings (after 4 matches): Metalist Kharkiv 10 points, AZ 6, Austria Wien 5, Malmö FF 0.
  - Group H:
    - Braga (Portugal) 5–1 (Slovenia) Maribor
    - Birmingham City (England) 2–2 (Belgium) Club Brugge
      - Standings (after 4 matches): Braga, Club Brugge, Birmingham City 7 points, Maribor 1.
  - Group I:
    - Celtic (Scotland) 3–1 (France) Rennes
    - Atlético Madrid (Spain) 4–0 (Italy) Udinese
      - Standings (after 4 matches): Atlético Madrid, Udinese 7 points, Celtic 5, Rennes 2.
  - Group J:
    - Schalke 04 (Germany) 0–0 (Cyprus) AEK Larnaca
    - Steaua București (Romania) 4–2 (Israel) Maccabi Haifa
      - Standings (after 4 matches): Schalke 04 8 points, Maccabi Haifa 6, Steaua București 5, AEK Larnaca 2.
  - Group K:
    - **Twente** (Netherlands) 3–2 (Denmark) Odense
    - Fulham (England) 4–1 (Poland) Wisła Kraków
      - Standings (after 4 matches): Twente 10 points, Fulham 7, Odense, Wisła Kraków 3.
  - Group L:
    - AEK Athens (Greece) 1–3 (Russia) Lokomotiv Moscow
    - **Anderlecht** (Belgium) 3–0 (Austria) Sturm Graz
      - Standings (after 4 matches): Anderlecht 12 points, Lokomotiv Moscow 9, Sturm Graz 3, AEK Athens 0.
- Copa Sudamericana Quarterfinals first leg:
  - Arsenal (Argentina) 1–2 Universidad de Chile
  - LDU Quito (Ecuador) 1–0 (Paraguay) Libertad
- UEFA Women's Champions League Round of 16 first leg:
  - Sparta Praha (Czech Republic) 0–6 (France) Olympique Lyon
  - FC Energy Voronezh (Russia) 0–4 (Russia) WFC Rossiyanka
  - Rayo Vallecano (Spain) 1–1 (England) Arsenal
- (United States) MLS Cup Playoffs Conference Semifinals, second leg (first leg scores in parentheses):
  - Eastern Conference: **Houston Dynamo** 1–0 (2–1) Philadelphia Union. Houston Dynamo win 3–1 on aggregate.
  - Western Conference: **Los Angeles Galaxy** 2–1 (1–0) New York Red Bulls. Los Angeles Galaxy win 3–1 on aggregate.

==== Snowboarding ====
- World Cup in Saas-Fee, Switzerland:
  - Men's halfpipe: (gold) Yuri Podladchikov (SUI) 95.3 points (silver) Ryō Aono (JPN) 91.3 (bronze) Janne Korpi (FIN) 87.0
    - Halfpipe standings (after 2 of 5 events): (1) Korpi 1600 points (2) Aono 1040 (3) Podladchikov 1000
    - Freestyle overall standings: (1) Korpi 2600 points (2) Dimi de Jong (NED) 1220 (3) Aono 1040
  - Women's halfpipe: (gold) Queralt Castellet (ESP) 87.0 points (silver) Sophie Rodriguez (FRA) 75.3 (bronze) Ursina Haller (SUI) 75.0
    - Halfpipe standings (after 2 of 5 events) & Freestyle overall standings: (1) Haller 1200 points (2) Castellet 1180 (3) Cai Xuetong (CHN) 1000

=== November 2, 2011 (Wednesday) ===
==== Baseball ====
- Nippon Professional Baseball Climax Series:
  - Central League Final Stage, Game 1 in Nagoya: Chunichi Dragons 2, Tokyo Yakult Swallows 1. Dragons lead series 2–0.

==== Basketball ====
- Euroleague Regular Season Matchday 3:
  - Group A: Caja Laboral (Spain) 81–79 (Greece) Olympiacos
    - Standings: Caja Laboral 3–0, (France) SLUC Nancy, (Spain) Bizkaia Bilbao, (Italy) Bennet Cantù 1–1, Olympiacos 1–2, (Turkey) Fenerbahçe Ülker 0–2.
  - Group B: KK Zagreb (Croatia) 47–89 (Russia) CSKA Moscow
    - Standings: CSKA Moscow 3–0, (Greece) Panathinaikos 2–0, (Germany) Brose Baskets, (Spain) Unicaja 1–1, (Lithuania) Žalgiris Kaunas 0–2, KK Zagreb 0–3.
  - Group D:
    - Montepaschi Siena (Italy) 103–77 (Turkey) Galatasaray Medical Park
    - Union Olimpija Ljubljana (Slovenia) 70–62 (Poland) Asseco Prokom Gdynia
      - Standings: Montepaschi Siena 3–0, (Spain) FC Barcelona Regal 2–0, (Russia) UNICS Kazan 1–1, Galatasaray Medical Park, Union Olimpija Ljubljana 1–2, Asseco Prokom Gdynia 0–3.

==== Cricket ====
- West Indies in Bangladesh:
  - 2nd Test in Dhaka, day 5: West Indies 355 & 383/5d; Bangladesh 231 & 278 (80.2 overs, Devendra Bishoo 5/90). **West Indies win by 229 runs; win 2-match series 1–0**.
- New Zealand in Zimbabwe:
  - Only Test in Bulawayo, day 2: New Zealand 426 (143.3 overs); Zimbabwe 82/1 (40 overs). Zimbabwe trail by 344 runs with 9 wickets remaining in the 1st innings.

==== Football (soccer) ====
- UEFA Champions League group stage Matchday 4 (teams in **bold** qualify for Round of 16):
  - Group A:
    - Bayern Munich (Germany) 3–2 (Italy) Napoli
    - Villarreal (Spain) 0–3 (England) Manchester City
      - Standings (after 4 matches): Bayern Munich 10 points, Manchester City 7, Napoli 5, Villarreal 0.
  - Group B:
    - Trabzonspor (Turkey) 0–0 (Russia) CSKA Moscow
    - Internazionale (Italy) 2–1 (France) Lille
      - Standings (after 4 matches): Internazionale 9 points, CSKA Moscow, Trabzonspor 5, Lille 2.
  - Group C:
    - Manchester United (England) 2–0 (Romania) Oțelul Galați
    - Benfica (Portugal) 1–1 (Switzerland) Basel
      - Standings (after 4 matches): Manchester United, Benfica 8 points, Basel 5, Oțelul Galați 0.
  - Group D:
    - Lyon (France) 0–2 (Spain) **Real Madrid**
    - Ajax (Netherlands) 4–0 (Croatia) Dinamo Zagreb
      - Standings (after 4 matches): Real Madrid 12 points, Ajax 7, Lyon 4, Dinamo Zagreb 0.
- Copa Sudamericana Quarterfinals first leg: Universitario (Peru) 2–0 (Brazil) Vasco da Gama
- UEFA Women's Champions League Round of 16 first leg:
  - 1. FFC Frankfurt (Germany) 3–0 (France) Paris Saint-Germain
  - Turbine Potsdam (Germany) 10–0 (Scotland) Glasgow City
  - Brøndby IF (Denmark) 2–1 (Italy) Torres
  - SV Neulengbach (Austria) 1–3 (Sweden) LdB Malmö
  - Fortuna Hjørring (Denmark) 0–1 (Sweden) Göteborg FC
- (United States) MLS Cup Playoffs Conference Semifinals, second leg (first leg scores in parentheses):
  - Eastern Conference: **Sporting Kansas City** 2–0 (2–0) Colorado Rapids. Sporting Kansas City win 4–0 on aggregate.
  - Western Conference: Seattle Sounders FC 2–0 (0–3) **Real Salt Lake**. Real Salt Lake win 3–2 on aggregate.

=== November 1, 2011 (Tuesday) ===
==== Cricket ====
- West Indies in Bangladesh:
  - 2nd Test in Dhaka, day 4: West Indies 355 & 383/5d (111.3 overs; Darren Bravo 195); Bangladesh 231 & 164/3 (47 overs). Bangladesh require another 344 runs with 7 wickets remaining.
- New Zealand in Zimbabwe:
  - Only Test in Bulawayo, day 1: New Zealand 275/3 (90 overs; Martin Guptill 109); Zimbabwe.

==== Football (soccer) ====
- UEFA Champions League group stage Matchday 4 (teams in **bold** qualify for Round of 16):
  - Group E:
    - Valencia (Spain) 3–1 (Germany) Bayer Leverkusen
    - Genk (Belgium) 1–1 (England) Chelsea
      - Standings (after 4 matches): Chelsea 8 points, Bayer Leverkusen 6, Valencia 5, Genk 2.
  - Group F:
    - Arsenal (England) 0–0 (France) Marseille
    - Borussia Dortmund (Germany) 1–0 (Greece) Olympiacos
      - Standings (after 4 matches): Arsenal 8 points, Marseille 7, Borussia Dortmund 4, Olympiacos 3.
  - Group G:
    - Zenit St. Petersburg (Russia) 1–0 (Ukraine) Shakhtar Donetsk
    - APOEL (Cyprus) 2–1 (Portugal) Porto
      - Standings (after 4 matches): APOEL 8 points, Zenit St. Petersburg 7, Porto 4, Shakhtar Donetsk 2.
  - Group H:
    - BATE Borisov (Belarus) 1–1 (Italy) **Milan**
    - Viktoria Plzeň (Czech Republic) 0–4 (Spain) **Barcelona**
      - Standings (after 4 matches): Barcelona 10 points, Milan 8, BATE Borisov 2, Viktoria Plzeň 1.
- Copa Sudamericana Quarterfinals first leg: Santa Fe (Colombia) 1–1 (Argentina) Vélez Sarsfield
- (Estonia) Meistriliiga, matchday 35 (team in **bold** qualify for Champions League, teams in italics qualify for Europa League): **Flora** 4–0 Viljandi
  - Standings: Flora 83 points, Kalju 79, Trans 73.
    - Flora win the title for the ninth time.

==== Horse racing ====
- Melbourne Cup in Melbourne: (gold) Dunaden (jockey: Christophe Lemaire (FRA), trainer: Mikel Delzangles) (silver) Red Cadeaux (bronze) Lucas Cranach
