= South American Gymnastics Championships =

Sports competition

The South American Gymnastics Confederation (CONSUGI) organizes South American Gymnastics Championships in different disciplines of gymnastics: men's and women's artistic gymnastics, rhythmic gymnastics, trampoline and tumbling, as well as aerobic gymnastics.

== History ==
The first edition of the South American Artistic Gymnastics Championships was held in 1957 in Buenos Aires. It was only the third time a major artistic gymnastics tournament was started in the Americas, after the gymnastics competitions at the Central American and Caribbean Games, first held in 1946, and the gymnastics competitions at the Pan American Games, first held in 1951. At the inaugural edition, in 1957, only men's events were competed. Women's events would be competed for the first time at the second edition of the championships, in 1969.

In 1978, the first edition of the South American Games, then titled the Southern Cross Games, was held in La Paz, Bolivia. One of the sports contested at the tournament was artistic gymnastics, and this served as the continental championships for that year. However, that same year, another edition of the South American Championships was held in Peru only ten days after the conclusion of the gymnastics events at the 1978 Southern Cross Games. In 1982, the gymnastics events at Southern Cross Games also served as the South American Gymnastics Championships for that year. This also seemed to be true in 1986, 1990, 1994, 1998 and 2002. However, in recent years, the gymnastics competitions at the South American Games seem to have been retroactively considered independent events by CONSUGI, since the 2021 South American Artistic Gymnastics Championships are officially considered the 18th edition of the championships.

In 1984, the first South American Championships in rhythmic gymnastics was held in Londrina, Brazil. However, the event was organized for athletes to represent clubs, instead of national committees. The first known event in rhythmic gymnastics where athletes represented their nations was held in 1988 in Rosario, Argentina. Similar to the stance adopted concerning the artistic gymnastics championships, rhythmic gymnastics events at the 1990, 1994, 1998 and 2002 South American Games were once considered part of the South American Championships.

Senior South American Championships have also been organized for aerobic gymnastics and trampoline gymnastics. South American championships in acrobatic gymnastics and in parkour were hosted for the first time in 2024.

== Senior events ==
=== Aerobic gymnastics ===
Year	Event	Location	Ref.
2013	2013 South American Aerobic Gymnastics Championships	(Colombia) Cali	
2014	2014 South American Aerobic Gymnastics Championships	(Paraguay) Asunción	
2015	2015 South American Aerobic Gymnastics Championships	(Peru) Lima	
2016	2016 South American Aerobic Gymnastics Championships	(Colombia) Bogotá	
2017	2017 South American Aerobic Gymnastics Championships	(Peru) Lima	
2018	2018 South American Aerobic Gymnastics Championships	(Peru) Lima	
2019	2019 South American Aerobic Gymnastics Championships	(Colombia) Melgar	
2021	2021 South American Aerobic Gymnastics Championships	(Colombia) Ibagué	
2022	2022 South American Aerobic Gymnastics Championships	(Peru) Lima	
2023	2023 South American Aerobic Gymnastics Championships	(Uruguay) Punta del Este	
2024	2024 South American Aerobic Gymnastics Championships	(Brazil) Aracaju	
2025	2025 South American Aerobic Gymnastics Championships	(Uruguay) Maldonado	

=== Artistic gymnastics ===
Year	Edition	Event	Location	Ref.
1957	I	1957 South American Artistic Gymnastics Championships	(Argentina) Buenos Aires	
1969	II	1969 South American Artistic Gymnastics Championships	(Brazil) Porto Alegre	
1976	III	1976 South American Artistic Gymnastics Championships	(Brazil) Porto Alegre	
1978	IV	1978 South American Artistic Gymnastics Championships	(Peru) Lima	
1980	V	1980 South American Artistic Gymnastics Championships	(Chile) Santiago	
1988	VI	1988 South American Artistic Gymnastics Championships	(Argentina) Rosario	
1996	VII	1996 South American Artistic Gymnastics Championships	(Bolivia) Santa Cruz de la Sierra	
2007	VIII	2007 South American Artistic Gymnastics Championships	(Colombia) Villavicencio	
2009	IX	2009 South American Artistic Gymnastics Championships	(Colombia) Sogamoso	
2011	X	2011 South American Artistic Gymnastics Championships	(Chile) Santiago	
2012	XI	2012 South American Artistic Gymnastics Championships	(Argentina) Rosario	
2013	XII	2013 South American Artistic Gymnastics Championships	(Chile) Santiago	
2014	XIII	2014 South American Artistic Gymnastics Championships	(Bolivia) Cochabamba	
2015	XIV	2015 South American Artistic Gymnastics Championships	(Colombia) Cali	
2016	XV	2016 South American Artistic Gymnastics Championships	(Peru) Lima	
2017	XVI	2017 South American Artistic Gymnastics Championships	(Bolivia) Cochabamba	
2019	XVII	2019 South American Artistic Gymnastics Championships	(Chile) Santiago	
2021	XVIII	2021 South American Artistic Gymnastics Championships	(Argentina) San Juan	
2022	XIX	2022 South American Artistic Gymnastics Championships	(Peru) Lima	
2023	XX	2023 South American Artistic Gymnastics Championships	(Colombia) Cali	
2024	XXI	2024 South American Artistic Gymnastics Championships	(Brazil) Aracaju	
2025	XXII	2025 South American Artistic Gymnastics Championships	(Colombia) Medellín	

=== Rhythmic gymnastics ===
Year	Event	Location	Ref.
1988	1988 South American Rhythmic Gymnastics Championships	(Argentina) Rosario	
1996	1996 South American Rhythmic Gymnastics Championships	(Bolivia) Santa Cruz de la Sierra	
2007	2007 South American Rhythmic Gymnastics Championships	(Venezuela) San Cristóbal	
2009	2009 South American Rhythmic Gymnastics Championships	(Ecuador) Guayaquil	
2010	2010 South American Rhythmic Gymnastics Championships	(Bolivia) Cochabamba	
2011	2011 South American Rhythmic Gymnastics Championships	(Venezuela) Maracaibo	
2012	2012 South American Rhythmic Gymnastics Championships	(Colombia) Cali	
2013	2013 South American Rhythmic Gymnastics Championships	(Chile) Santiago	
2014	2014 South American Rhythmic Gymnastics Championships	(Colombia) Cúcuta	
2015	2015 South American Rhythmic Gymnastics Championships	(Bolivia) Cochabamba	
2016	2016 South American Rhythmic Gymnastics Championships	(Colombia) Paipa	
2017	2017 South American Rhythmic Gymnastics Championships	(Bolivia) Cochabamba	
2018	2018 South American Rhythmic Gymnastics Championships	(Colombia) Melgar	
2019	2019 South American Rhythmic Gymnastics Championships	(Colombia) Bogotá	
2021	2021 South American Rhythmic Gymnastics Championships	(Colombia) Cali	
2022	2022 South American Rhythmic Gymnastics Championships	(Colombia) Paipa	
2023	2023 South American Rhythmic Gymnastics Championships	(Colombia) Barranquilla	
2024	2024 South American Rhythmic Gymnastics Championships	(Chile) Santiago	
2025	2025 South American Rhythmic Gymnastics Championships	(Bolivia) Cochabamba	
2026	2026 South American Rhythmic Gymnastics Championships	(Paraguay) Asunción	

=== Trampoline and tumbling ===
Year	Edition	Event	Location	Ref.
2013	I	2013 South American Trampoline Championships	(Colombia) Bogotá	
2014	II	2014 South American Trampoline Championships	(Bolivia) Cochabamba	
2015	III	2015 South American Trampoline Championships	(Colombia) Bogotá	
2016	IV	2016 South American Trampoline Championships	(Colombia) Bogotá	
2017	V	2017 South American Trampoline Championships	(Colombia) Paipa	
2018	VI	2018 South American Trampoline Championships	(Bolivia) Cochabamba	
2019	VII	2019 South American Trampoline Championships	(Colombia) Paipa	
2021	VIII	2021 South American Trampoline Championships	(Bolivia) Cochabamba	
2022	IX	2022 South American Trampoline Championships	(Colombia) Bucaramanga	
2023	X	2023 South American Trampoline Championships	(Argentina) Rio Negro	
2024	XI	2024 South American Trampoline Championships	(Colombia) Barranquilla	
2025	XII	2025 South American Trampoline Championships	(Bolivia) Cochabamba	

== Junior events ==
Year	Event	Location	Ref.
1985	1985 Junior South American Artistic Gymnastics Championships	(Peru) Lima	
1987	1987 Junior South American Artistic Gymnastics Championships	(Brazil) Porto Alegre	
1987	1987 Junior South American Rhythmic Gymnastics Championships	(Ecuador) Unknown	
1989	1989 Junior South American Rhythmic Gymnastics Championships	(Chile) Santiago	
1991	1991 Junior South American Artistic and Rhythmic Gymnastics Championships	(Argentina) Salta	
1993	1993 Junior South American Artistic and Rhythmic Gymnastics Championships	(Ecuador) Portoviejo	
1995	1995 Youth South American Rhythmic Gymnastics Championships	(Peru) Lima	
1997	1997 Junior South American Artistic Gymnastics Championships	(Chile) La Serena	
1999	1999 Junior South American Artistic Gymnastics Championships	(Venezuela) Maracaibo	
1999	1999 Youth South American Artistic Gymnastics Championships	(Chile) La Serena	
2001	2001 Junior South American Artistic and Rhythmic Gymnastics Championships	(Uruguay) Paysandú	
2002	2002 Junior South American Artistic Gymnastics Championships	(Ecuador) Guayaquil	
2003	2003 Junior South American Artistic Gymnastics Championships	(Ecuador) Quito	
2004	2004 Junior South American Artistic Gymnastics Championships	(Ecuador) Guayaquil	
2005	2005 Junior South American Artistic Gymnastics Championships	(Ecuador) Portoviejo	
2006	2006 Junior South American Artistic and Rhythmic Gymnastics Championships	(Ecuador) Portoviejo	
2008	2008 Junior South American Artistic Gymnastics Championships	(Peru) Lima	
2010	2010 Junior South American Artistic Gymnastics Championships	(Colombia) Medellín	
2012	2012 Junior South American Artistic Gymnastics Championships	(Bolivia) Cochabamba	
2012	2012 Junior South American Rhythmic Gymnastics Championships	(Colombia) Cali	
2013	2013 Junior South American Artistic Gymnastics Championships	(Colombia) Sogamoso	
2013	2013 Junior South American Rhythmic Gymnastics Championships	(Bolivia) Santa Cruz de la Sierra	
2014	2014 Junior South American Artistic Gymnastics Championships	(Peru) Trujillo	
2015	2015 Junior South American Artistic Gymnastics Championships	(Argentina) Rosario	
2017	2017 Junior South American Artistic Gymnastics Championships	(Argentina) Mar del Plata	
2017	2017 Junior South American Rhythmic Gymnastics Championships	(Ecuador) Guayaquil	
2018	2018 Junior South American Artistic Gymnastics Championships	(Peru) Lima	
2019	2019 Junior South American Artistic Gymnastics Championships	(Colombia) Cali	
2019	2019 Junior South American Rhythmic Gymnastics Championships	(Peru) Lima	
2021	2021 Junior South American Artistic Gymnastics Championships	(Bolivia) Cochabamba	
2021	2021 Junior South American Rhythmic Gymnastics Championships	(Colombia) Cali	
2022	2022 Junior South American Artistic Gymnastics Championships	(Ecuador) Guayaquil	
2022	2022 Junior South American Rhythmic Gymnastics Championships	(Colombia) Paipa	
2023	2023 Junior South American Artistic Gymnastics Championships	(Argentina) Rio Negro	
2023	2023 Junior South American Rhythmic Gymnastics Championships	(Paraguay) Asunción	
2024	2024 Junior South American Artistic Gymnastics Championships	(Paraguay) Asunción	
2024	2024 Junior South American Rhythmic Gymnastics Championships	(Brazil) Aracaju	
2025	2025 Junior South American Artistic Gymnastics Championships	(Colombia) Medellín	
2025	2025 Junior South American Rhythmic Gymnastics Championships	(Argentina) Posadas	
2026	2026 Junior South American Artistic Gymnastics Championships	(Bolivia) Santa Cruz	
2026	2026 Junior South American Rhythmic Gymnastics Championships	(Colombia) Medellín	

== See also ==
- Gymnastics at the South American Games
- Pan American Gymnastics Championships
