= Pan American Gymnastics Championships =

Sports competition

The Pan American Gymnastics Union organizes Pan American Gymnastics Championships in different disciplines of gymnastics: men's and women's artistic gymnastics, rhythmic gymnastics, acrobatic gymnastics, trampoline and tumbling, as well as aerobic gymnastics. The Pan American Gymnastics Championships are considered by the International Gymnastics Federation to be the official continental championships for the Americas (comprising North America, South America, Central America and the Caribbean). It have also been organized for the sport of aesthetic group gymnastics.

== History ==
Artistic gymnastics competitions have been contested in the Americas since 1946, at the fifth edition of the Central American and Caribbean Games. In 1951, the sport was contested at the inaugural edition of the Pan American Games, and in 1957 the first edition of the South American championships in artistic gymnastics was held in Buenos Aires, Argentina. In 1964, the North American Championships in artistic gymnastics was contested for the first time. The meet would be staged until 1968, and in 1969 the competition changed its name to Copa de las Americas (Cup of the Americas) to allow South American nations to compete. At least one South American nation, Brazil, intended to compete, but eventually the event was attended only by North American nations.

Only in 1987, with the development and growth of gymnastics around the world, a tournament for junior gymnasts from the Americas was established with competitions in artistic and rhythmic gymnastics. The event was originally scheduled to take place in 1986, but was ultimately held from February 20 to 28, 1987, in Barquisimeto, Venezuela. It was the first international tournament held on a continental level in the Americas outside of the gymnastics events at the Pan American Games, and the first of its kind for junior gymnasts. A tournament for senior artistic and rhythmic gymnasts took place for the first time in 1989, named the Pan American Cup. A second edition of the tournament was scheduled for four years later, in December 1993, in Maracaibo, Venezuela, with events in men's and women's artistic gymnastics.

In 1997, the title Pan American Cup was dropped in favor of Pan American Gymnastics Championships. The title Pan American Cup would then be used to represent tournaments between clubs, instead of tournaments between national representatives. The 1997 Pan American Gymnastics Championships was held in Medellín, Colombia, and was attended by artistic and rhythmic gymnasts. In 1995, the International Gymnastics Federation (FIG) recognized aerobic gymnastics (then sport aerobics) as a new competitive gymnastics discipline. The first edition of the Pan American Aerobic Gymnastics Championships was held in Mérida, Venezuela, in 1999.

The FIG recognized two new gymnastics disciplines, acrobatic gymnastics, as well as trampoline and tumbling, in 1999. In 2004, the Pan American Trampoline and Tumbling Championships was organized for the first time in Tampa, United States. The first edition of the Pan American Acrobatic Gymnastics Championships was organized in 2015. In 2018, parkour was introduced by the FIG as a gymnastics discipline. To date, no Pan American Championships in parkour have been held.

Pan American championships also exist for the sport of aesthetic group gymnastics, a discipline not recognized by the FIG, organized, instead, by the International Federation of Aesthetic Group Gymnastics (IFAGG). The first edition of the tournament was organized in 2017 in Mérida, Mexico.

== Senior editions ==
=== Acrobatic gymnastics ===
Year	Event	Edition	Location	Ref.
2015	2015 Pan American Acrobatic Gymnastics Championships	I	(Puerto Rico) Caguas	
2017	2017 Pan American Acrobatic Gymnastics Championships	II	(United States) Daytona Beach	
2019	2019 Pan American Acrobatic Gymnastics Championships	III	(Mexico) Monterrey	
2022	2022 Pan American Acrobatic Gymnastics Championships	IV	(Colombia) Bogotá	
2023	2023 Pan American Acrobatic Gymnastics Championships	V	(Colombia) Ibagué	
2025	2025 Pan American Acrobatic Gymnastics Championships	VI	(Puerto Rico) Carolina	

=== Aerobic gymnastics ===
Year	Event	Edition	Location	Ref.
1999	1999 Pan American Aerobic Gymnastics Championships	I	(Venezuela) Mérida	
2001	2001 Pan American Aerobic Gymnastics Championships	II	(Chile) Santiago	
2005	2005 Pan American Aerobic Gymnastics Championships	III	Mexico City	
2006	2006 Pan American Aerobic Gymnastics Championships	IV	(Venezuela) San Cristobal	
2007	2007 Pan American Aerobic Gymnastics Championships	V	(Mexico) Morelos	
2009	2009 Pan American Aerobic Gymnastics Championships	VI	(Mexico) Morelos	
2010	2010 Pan American Aerobic Gymnastics Championships	VII	(Brazil) Balneário Camboriú	
2011	2011 Pan American Aerobic Gymnastics Championships	VIII	(Venezuela) Yaracuy	
2012	2012 Pan American Aerobic Gymnastics Championships	IX	(Mexico) Acapulco	
2013	2013 Pan American Aerobic Gymnastics Championships	X	(Chile) Santiago	
2015	2015 Pan American Aerobic Gymnastics Championships	XI	(Mexico) Morelos	
2016	2016 Pan American Aerobic Gymnastics Championships	XII	(Peru) Lima	
2017	2017 Pan American Aerobic Gymnastics Championships	XIII	(Colombia) Bogotá	
2018	2018 Pan American Aerobic Gymnastics Championships	XIV	(Peru) Lima	
2019	2019 Pan American Aerobic Gymnastics Championships	XV	(Argentina) Buenos Aires	
2021	2021 Pan American Aerobic Gymnastics Championships	XVI	(Mexico) Oaxtepec	
2022	2022 Pan American Aerobic Gymnastics Championships	XVII	(Colombia) Cúcuta	
2023	2023 Pan American Aerobic Gymnastics Championships	XVIII	(Peru) Lima	
2024	2024 Pan American Aerobic Gymnastics Championships	XIX	Panama City	
2025	2025 Pan American Aerobic Gymnastics Championships	XX	(Uruguay) Montevideo	

=== Artistic gymnastics ===
Year	Event	Location	Ref.
1997	1997 Pan American Gymnastics Championships	(Colombia) Medellín	
2001	2001 Pan American Gymnastics Championships	(Mexico) Cancún	
2004	2004 Pan American Individual Event Artistic Gymnastics Championships	(Venezuela) Maracaibo	
2005	2005 Pan American Gymnastics Championships	(Brazil) Rio de Janeiro	
2008	2008 Pan American Individual Event Artistic Gymnastics Championships	(Argentina) Rosario	
2010	2010 Pan American Gymnastics Championships	(Mexico) Guadalajara	
2012	2012 Pan American Individual Event Artistic Gymnastics Championships	(Colombia) Medellín	
2013	2013 Pan American Individual Event Artistic Gymnastics Championships	(Puerto Rico) San Juan	
2014	2014 Pan American Gymnastics Championships	(Canada) Mississauga	
2016	2016 Pan American Individual Event Artistic Gymnastics Championships	(Bolivia) Sucre	
2017	2017 Pan American Individual Event Artistic Gymnastics Championships	(Peru) Lima	
2018	2018 Pan American Gymnastics Championships	(Peru) Lima	
2021	2021 Pan American Gymnastics Championships	(Brazil) Rio de Janeiro	
2022	2022 Pan American Gymnastics Championships	(Brazil) Rio de Janeiro	
2023	2023 Pan American Artistic Gymnastics Championships	(Colombia) Medellín	
2024	2024 Pan American Artistic Gymnastics Championships	(Colombia) Santa Marta	
2025	2025 Pan American Artistic Gymnastics Championships	Panama City	
2026	2026 Pan American Artistic Gymnastics Championships	(Brazil) Rio de Janeiro	

=== Rhythmic gymnastics ===
Year	Event	Location	Ref.
1997	1997 Pan American Gymnastics Championships	(Colombia) Medellín	
2001	2001 Pan American Gymnastics Championships	(Mexico) Cancún	
2005	2005 Pan American Gymnastics Championships	(Brazil) Vitória	
2010	2010 Pan American Gymnastics Championships	(Mexico) Guadalajara	
2014	2014 Pan American Gymnastics Championships	(Canada) Mississauga	
2016	2016 Pan American Rhythmic Gymnastics Championships	(Mexico) Merida	
2017	2017 Pan American Rhythmic Gymnastics Championships	(United States) Daytona Beach	
2018	2018 Pan American Gymnastics Championships	(Peru) Lima	
2021	2021 Pan American Gymnastics Championships	(Brazil) Rio de Janeiro	
2022	2022 Pan American Gymnastics Championships	(Brazil) Rio de Janeiro	
2023	2023 Pan American Rhythmic Gymnastics Championships	(Mexico) Guadalajara	
2024	2024 Pan American Rhythmic Gymnastics Championships	Guatemala City	
2025	2025 Pan American Rhythmic Gymnastics Championships	(Paraguay) Asunción	
2026	2026 Pan American Rhythmic Gymnastics Championships	(Brazil) Rio de Janeiro	

=== Trampoline and tumbling ===
Year	Event	Edition	Location	Ref.
2004	2004 Pan American Trampoline and Tumbling Championships	I	(United States) Tampa	
2006	2006 Pan American Trampoline and Tumbling Championships	II	(Mexico) Monterrey	
2008	2008 Pan American Trampoline and Tumbling Championships	III	(Argentina) Buenos Aires	
2010	2010 Pan American Trampoline and Tumbling Championships	IV	(United States) Daytona Beach	
2012	2012 Pan American Trampoline and Tumbling Championships	V	(Mexico) Querétaro	
2014	2014 Pan American Gymnastics Championships	VI	(Canada) Mississauga	
2016	2016 Pan American Trampoline and Tumbling Championships	VII	(Colombia) Bogotá	
2018	2018 Pan American Gymnastics Championships	VIII	(Peru) Lima	
2021	2021 Pan American Gymnastics Championships	IX	(Brazil) Rio de Janeiro	
2022	2022 Pan American Gymnastics Championships	X	(Brazil) Rio de Janeiro	
2023	2023 Pan American Trampoline and Tumbling Championships	XI	(Mexico) Monterrey	
2024	2024 Pan American Trampoline and Tumbling Championships	XII	(Peru) Lima	
2025	2025 Pan American Trampoline and Tumbling Championships	XIII	(El Salvador) Santa Tecla	
2026	2026 Pan American Trampoline and Tumbling Championships	XIV	(Colombia) Medellín	

== All-time medal table ==
=== Acrobatic gymnastics ===
2015–2025; Senior events
Rank	Nation	Gold	Silver	Bronze	Total
1	United States (USA)	33	0	0	33
2	Canada (CAN)	4	4	0	8
3	Brazil (BRA)	2	5	0	7
4	Colombia (COL)	1	1	0	2
5	Puerto Rico (PUR)	1	0	0	1
Totals (5 entries)		41	10	0	51

=== Artistic gymnastics ===
1997–2026; Senior events
Rank	Nation	Gold	Silver	Bronze	Total
1	United States (USA)	75	59	31	165
2	Brazil (BRA)	45	43	50	138
3	Cuba (CUB)	20	21	15	56
4	Mexico (MEX)	16	13	15	44
5	Colombia (COL)	15	23	16	54
6	Canada (CAN)	15	22	25	62
7	Venezuela (VEN)	10	13	9	32
8	Argentina (ARG)	9	13	28	50
9	Puerto Rico (PUR)	6	15	15	36
10	Guatemala (GUA)	6	2	3	11
11	Chile (CHI)	4	7	7	18
12	Panama (PAN)	3	2	0	5
13	Dominican Republic (DOM)	3	0	2	5
14	Peru (PER)	1	2	1	4
15	Ecuador (ECU)	1	1	1	3
16	Costa Rica (CRC)	1	1	0	2
17	Uruguay (URU)	0	0	2	2
18	Jamaica (JAM)	0	0	1	1
Totals (18 entries)		230	237	221	688

=== Rhythmic gymnastics ===
1997–2026; Senior events
Rank	Nation	Gold	Silver	Bronze	Total
1	Brazil (BRA)	56	40	28	124
2	United States (USA)	37	35	32	104
3	Mexico (MEX)	21	29	25	75
4	Canada (CAN)	5	6	15	26
5	Cuba (CUB)	4	6	6	16
6	Argentina (ARG)	1	7	8	16
7	Chile (CHI)	0	0	4	4
7	Venezuela (VEN)	0	0	4	4
9	Colombia (COL)	0	0	1	1
Totals (9 entries)		124	123	123	370

=== Trampoline and tumbling ===
2004–2026; Senior events
Rank	Nation	Gold	Silver	Bronze	Total
1	Canada (CAN)	52	37	23	112
2	United States (USA)	40	32	19	91
3	Brazil (BRA)	16	24	25	65
4	Argentina (ARG)	9	16	27	52
5	Colombia (COL)	6	3	8	17
6	Mexico (MEX)	5	11	13	29
7	Bolivia (BOL)	0	1	1	2
8	Ecuador (ECU)	0	0	1	1
Totals (8 entries)		128	124	117	369

== Best results by event and nation ==
=== Artistic gymnastics ===
Event		(Argentina) ARG	(Brazil) BRA	(Canada) CAN	(Chile) CHI	(Colombia) COL	(Costa Rica) CRC	(Cuba) CUB	(Dominican Republic) DOM	(Ecuador) ECU	(Guatemala) GUA	(Jamaica) JAM	(Mexico) MEX	(Panama) PAN	(Peru) PER	(Puerto Rico) PUR	(United States) USA	(Uruguay) URU	(Venezuela) VEN
M A G
M A G	Team	3rd place, bronze medalist(s)	1st place, gold medalist(s)	1st place, gold medalist(s)		2nd place, silver medalist(s)		1st place, gold medalist(s)								2nd place, silver medalist(s)	1st place, gold medalist(s)		
M A G	Individual all-around	3rd place, bronze medalist(s)	1st place, gold medalist(s)	2nd place, silver medalist(s)	2nd place, silver medalist(s)	1st place, gold medalist(s)		1st place, gold medalist(s)					1st place, gold medalist(s)			2nd place, silver medalist(s)	1st place, gold medalist(s)		1st place, gold medalist(s)
M A G	Floor exercise	2nd place, silver medalist(s)	1st place, gold medalist(s)	1st place, gold medalist(s)	1st place, gold medalist(s)	2nd place, silver medalist(s)		2nd place, silver medalist(s)		1st place, gold medalist(s)	1st place, gold medalist(s)		1st place, gold medalist(s)		1st place, gold medalist(s)	1st place, gold medalist(s)	1st place, gold medalist(s)	3rd place, bronze medalist(s)	2nd place, silver medalist(s)
M A G	Pommel horse	1st place, gold medalist(s)	1st place, gold medalist(s)	1st place, gold medalist(s)		2nd place, silver medalist(s)		1st place, gold medalist(s)		2nd place, silver medalist(s)		3rd place, bronze medalist(s)	1st place, gold medalist(s)			1st place, gold medalist(s)	1st place, gold medalist(s)		1st place, gold medalist(s)
M A G	Still rings	1st place, gold medalist(s)	1st place, gold medalist(s)	1st place, gold medalist(s)	1st place, gold medalist(s)	2nd place, silver medalist(s)		2nd place, silver medalist(s)					1st place, gold medalist(s)			1st place, gold medalist(s)	2nd place, silver medalist(s)		1st place, gold medalist(s)
M A G	Vault	3rd place, bronze medalist(s)	1st place, gold medalist(s)	1st place, gold medalist(s)	1st place, gold medalist(s)	2nd place, silver medalist(s)		1st place, gold medalist(s)	1st place, gold medalist(s)		1st place, gold medalist(s)		1st place, gold medalist(s)		2nd place, silver medalist(s)	1st place, gold medalist(s)	1st place, gold medalist(s)	3rd place, bronze medalist(s)	2nd place, silver medalist(s)
M A G	Parallel bars	2nd place, silver medalist(s)	1st place, gold medalist(s)	1st place, gold medalist(s)		1st place, gold medalist(s)		1st place, gold medalist(s)	3rd place, bronze medalist(s)		3rd place, bronze medalist(s)		1st place, gold medalist(s)			3rd place, bronze medalist(s)	1st place, gold medalist(s)		1st place, gold medalist(s)
M A G	Horizontal bar	1st place, gold medalist(s)	1st place, gold medalist(s)	1st place, gold medalist(s)	3rd place, bronze medalist(s)	1st place, gold medalist(s)		2nd place, silver medalist(s)	1st place, gold medalist(s)				2nd place, silver medalist(s)			2nd place, silver medalist(s)	1st place, gold medalist(s)		1st place, gold medalist(s)
W A G
W A G	Team	3rd place, bronze medalist(s)	1st place, gold medalist(s)	2nd place, silver medalist(s)				3rd place, bronze medalist(s)					2nd place, silver medalist(s)				1st place, gold medalist(s)		
W A G	Individual all-around	2nd place, silver medalist(s)	1st place, gold medalist(s)	2nd place, silver medalist(s)			2nd place, silver medalist(s)	2nd place, silver medalist(s)					1st place, gold medalist(s)				1st place, gold medalist(s)		2nd place, silver medalist(s)
W A G	Vault	3rd place, bronze medalist(s)	1st place, gold medalist(s)	2nd place, silver medalist(s)		3rd place, bronze medalist(s)		1st place, gold medalist(s)	1st place, gold medalist(s)	3rd place, bronze medalist(s)			1st place, gold medalist(s)	1st place, gold medalist(s)	3rd place, bronze medalist(s)	2nd place, silver medalist(s)	1st place, gold medalist(s)		
W A G	Uneven bars	3rd place, bronze medalist(s)	1st place, gold medalist(s)	1st place, gold medalist(s)		1st place, gold medalist(s)		2nd place, silver medalist(s)					1st place, gold medalist(s)				1st place, gold medalist(s)		2nd place, silver medalist(s)
W A G	Balance beam	1st place, gold medalist(s)	1st place, gold medalist(s)	1st place, gold medalist(s)	3rd place, bronze medalist(s)		1st place, gold medalist(s)	3rd place, bronze medalist(s)			1st place, gold medalist(s)		2nd place, silver medalist(s)				1st place, gold medalist(s)		2nd place, silver medalist(s)
W A G	Floor exercise	1st place, gold medalist(s)	1st place, gold medalist(s)	1st place, gold medalist(s)	2nd place, silver medalist(s)	2nd place, silver medalist(s)		3rd place, bronze medalist(s)					2nd place, silver medalist(s)			2nd place, silver medalist(s)	1st place, gold medalist(s)		2nd place, silver medalist(s)

== Junior editions ==
The first edition of the Pan American Championships for youth and junior gymnasts was originally scheduled to take place in Barquisimeto, Venezuela, in 1986, but was ultimately postponed to February 1987.

=== Artistic gymnastics ===
Year	Event	Location	Ref.
1987	1987 Junior Pan American Artistic Gymnastics Championships	(Venezuela) Barquisimeto	
1988	1988 Junior Pan American Artistic Gymnastics Championships	(Puerto Rico) Ponce	
1990	1990 Junior Pan American Artistic Gymnastics Championships	(United States) Tallahassee	
1992	1992 Junior Pan American Artistic Gymnastics Championships	(Brazil) São Paulo	
1994	1994 Junior Pan American Artistic Gymnastics Championships	(Mexico) Monterrey	
1996	1996 Junior Pan American Artistic Gymnastics Championships	Guatemala City	
1998	1998 Junior Pan American Artistic Gymnastics Championships	(United States) Houston	
2000	2000 Junior Pan American Artistic Gymnastics Championships	(Brazil) Curitiba	
2002	2002 Junior Pan American Artistic Gymnastics Championships	(Dominican Republic) Santo Domingo	
2004	2004 Junior Pan American Artistic Gymnastics Championships	(El Salvador) San Salvador	
2006	2006 Junior Pan American Artistic Gymnastics Championships	(Canada) Québec	
2007	2007 Junior Pan American Artistic Gymnastics Championships	Guatemala City	
2009	2009 Junior Pan American Artistic Gymnastics Championships	(Brazil) Aracaju	
2012	2012 Junior Pan American Artistic Gymnastics Championships	(Colombia) Medellín	
2014	2014 Junior Pan American Artistic Gymnastics Championships	(Brazil) Aracaju	
2016	2016 Junior Pan American Artistic Gymnastics Championships	(Bolivia) Sucre	
2018	2018 Junior Pan American Artistic Gymnastics Championships	(Argentina) Buenos Aires	
2021	2021 Junior Pan American Artistic Gymnastics Championships	(Mexico) Guadalajara	
2022	2022 Pan American Gymnastics Championships	(Brazil) Rio de Janeiro	
2024	2024 Pan American Artistic Gymnastics Championships	(Colombia) Santa Marta	
2026	2026 Pan American Artistic Gymnastics Championships	(Brazil) Rio de Janeiro	

=== Rhythmic gymnastics ===
Year	Event	Location	Ref.
1987	1987 Junior Pan American Rhythmic Gymnastics Championships	(Venezuela) Barquisimeto	
1988	1988 Junior Pan American Rhythmic Gymnastics Championships	(Puerto Rico) Salinas	
1990	1990 Junior Pan American Rhythmic Gymnastics Championships	(United States) Tallahassee	
1992	1992 Junior Pan American Rhythmic Gymnastics Championships	(Brazil) São Paulo	
1994	1994 Junior Pan American Rhythmic Gymnastics Championships	(Mexico) Monterrey	
1996	1996 Junior Pan American Rhythmic Gymnastics Championships	Guatemala City	
1998	1998 Junior Pan American Rhythmic Gymnastics Championships	(United States) Houston	
2000	2000 Junior Pan American Rhythmic Gymnastics Championships	(Venezuela) San Felipe	
2002	2002 Junior Pan American Rhythmic Gymnastics Championships	(Dominican Republic) Santo Domingo	
2004	2004 Junior Pan American Rhythmic Gymnastics Championships	(El Salvador) San Salvador	
2006	2006 Junior Pan American Rhythmic Gymnastics Championships	(Canada) Toronto	
2007	2007 Junior Pan American Rhythmic Gymnastics Championships	(Venezuela) San Cristóbal	
2009	2009 Junior Pan American Rhythmic Gymnastics Championships	(Cuba) Havana	
2012	2012 Junior Pan American Rhythmic Gymnastics Championships	(Argentina) Córdoba	
2014	2014 Junior Pan American Rhythmic Gymnastics Championships	(United States) Daytona Beach	
2016	2016 Junior Pan American Rhythmic Gymnastics Championships	(Mexico) Merida	
2017	2017 Junior Pan American Rhythmic Gymnastics Championships	(United States) Daytona Beach	
2018	2018 Junior Pan American Rhythmic Gymnastics Championships	(Colombia) Medellín	
2019	2019 Junior Pan American Rhythmic Gymnastics Championships	(Mexico) Monterrey	
2021	2021 Junior Pan American Rhythmic Gymnastics Championships	Guatemala City	
2022	2022 Pan American Gymnastics Championships	(Brazil) Rio de Janeiro	
2023	2023 Pan American Rhythmic Gymnastics Championships	(Mexico) Guadalajara	
2024	2024 Pan American Rhythmic Gymnastics Championships	Guatemala City	
2025	2025 Pan American Rhythmic Gymnastics Championships	(Paraguay) Asunción	
2026	2026 Pan American Rhythmic Gymnastics Championships	(Brazil) Rio de Janeiro	

=== Other disciplines ===
Year	Event	Location	Discipline(s) competed	Ref.
2006	2006 Pan American Trampoline and Tumbling Championships	(Mexico) Monterrey	Trampoline	
2012	2012 Pan American Aerobic Gymnastics Championships	(Mexico) Acapulco	Aerobic gymnastics	
2014	2014 Pan American Trampoline Championships	(United States) Daytona Beach	Trampoline and tumbling	
2015	2015 Pan American Acrobatic Gymnastics Championships	(Puerto Rico) Caguas	Acrobatic gymnastics	
2017	2017 Pan American Acrobatic Gymnastics Championships	(United States) Daytona Beach	Acrobatic gymnastics	
2018	2018 Pan American Trampoline Championships	(Bolivia) Cochabamba	Trampoline and tumbling	
2019	2019 Pan American Acrobatic Gymnastics Championships	(Mexico) Monterrey	Acrobatic gymnastics	
2021	2021 Pan American Gymnastics Championships	(Brazil) Rio de Janeiro	Trampoline	
2022	2022 Pan American Gymnastics Championships	(Brazil) Rio de Janeiro	Trampoline	
2024	2024 Pan American Trampoline and Tumbling Championships	(Peru) Lima	Trampoline	
2025	2025 Pan American Acrobatic Gymnastics Championships	(Puerto Rico) Carolina	Acrobatic gymnastics	

== All-time medal table ==
=== Artistic gymnastics ===
1987–2026; Junior events
Rank	Nation	Gold	Silver	Bronze	Total
1	United States (USA)	165	123	83	371
2	Brazil (BRA)	40	38	59	137
3	Canada (CAN)	33	59	57	149
4	Colombia (COL)	26	12	17	55
5	Cuba (CUB)	25	13	5	43
6	Puerto Rico (PUR)	8	9	16	33
7	Mexico (MEX)	7	11	23	41
8	Argentina (ARG)	6	20	27	53
9	Venezuela (VEN)	2	2	5	9
10	Chile (CHI)	1	4	4	9
11	Guatemala (GUA)	1	4	2	7
12	Ecuador (ECU)	1	1	0	2
13	Dominican Republic (DOM)	1	0	2	3
14	El Salvador (ESA)	1	0	0	1
15	Peru (PER)	0	3	2	5
16	Costa Rica (CRC)	0	1	0	1
17	Jamaica (JAM)	0	0	1	1
Totals (17 entries)		317	300	303	920

=== Rhythmic gymnastics ===
1987–2026; Junior events
Rank	Nation	Gold	Silver	Bronze	Total
1	United States (USA)	103	69	46	218
2	Canada (CAN)	37	43	39	119
3	Brazil (BRA)	26	34	32	92
4	Mexico (MEX)	15	34	40	89
5	Argentina (ARG)	5	12	10	27
6	Venezuela (VEN)	4	4	5	13
7	Cuba (CUB)	3	3	8	14
8	Chile (CHI)	2	0	11	13
9	Peru (PER)	1	0	1	2
10	Puerto Rico (PUR)	0	0	2	2
Totals (10 entries)		196	199	194	589

== Aesthetic group gymnastics ==
Senior

Year	Event	Location	Gold	Silver	Bronze	Ref.
2017	2017 Pan American Aesthetic Group Gymnastics Championships	(Mexico) Mérida	Brazil; Marrie Cotia	Mexico; Charlottes	Canada; Rhythmic Expressions	
2018	2018 Pan American Aesthetic Group Gymnastics Championships	(Brazil) Santos	Canada; Rhythmic Expressions	Brazil; Cuba Team	None awarded	
2020	~~2020 Pan American Aesthetic Group Gymnastics Championships~~	(Canada) Toronto	Canceled due to the COVID-19 pandemic in Canada			

== See also ==
- Gymnastics at the Pan American Games
- South American Gymnastics Championships
