= Daienne Lima =

Brazilian trampoline gymnast

- Full name: Daienne Cardoso Lima
- Born: 9 June 1993 (age 33) Rio de Janeiro, Brazil.

Gymnastics career
- Discipline: Trampoline gymnastics
- Country represented: Brazil (2010(?)-)
- Club: MINAS TENIS CLUBE
Medal record
Pan American Championships
Silver medal – second place	2016 Bogotá	Synchro
Bronze medal – third place	2018 Lima	Synchro
South American Championships
Gold medal – first place	2016 Bogotá	Individual
Gold medal – first place	2017 Paipa	Individual
Silver medal – second place	2017 Paipa	Team

Daienne Cardoso Lima (born 9 June 1993) is a Brazilian individual trampolinist who has represented the nation at international competitions.

She has competed at world championships, including at the 2010, 2011, 2015 Trampoline World Championships. She has also competed at the 2010 Summer Youth Olympics.

== Personal ==
Lima currently resides in Belo Horizonte.
