= Lucas Tobias =

Brazilian trampoline gymnast

- Full name: Lucas Junio Tobias
- Born: 28 December 1999 (age 26) Ouro Preto, Brazil

Gymnastics career
- Discipline: Trampoline gymnastics
- Country represented: Brazil
Medal record
Men's trampoline gymnastics
Representing Brazil
Pan American Games
Bronze medal – third place	2023 Santiago	Synchro
Pan American Championships
Silver medal – second place	2018 Lima	Synchro
Silver medal – second place	2023 Monterrey	Synchro
South American Games
Bronze medal – third place	2022 Asunción	Individual
South American Championships
Gold medal – first place	2023 Bariloche	Team
Silver medal – second place	2017 Paipa	Double mini
Silver medal – second place	2022 Bucaramanga	Team
Bronze medal – third place	2017 Paipa	Individual
Bronze medal – third place	2019 Paipa	Team
Bronze medal – third place	2022 Bucaramanga	Synchro

Lucas Junio Tobias (born 28 December 1999) is a Brazilian individual and synchronised trampoline gymnast, representing his nation at international competitions. He competed at Trampoline Gymnastics World Championships in 2019, 2022 and 2023.
