= Marcela Lopez =

Brazilian aerobic gymnast

- Nickname: Ma or Ce
- Born: October 13, 1982 (age 43) São Paulo, Brazil
- Height: 158 cm (5 ft 2 in)

Gymnastics career
- Discipline: Aerobic gymnastics
- Country represented: Brazil
- Head coach: Luciana July
- Retired: 2011
Medal record
World Games
Gold medal – first place	2009 Kaohsiung	Individual
World Championships
Gold medal – first place	2004 Sofia	Trio
Gold medal – first place	2006 Nanjing	Individual
Gold medal – first place	2008 Ulm	Individual
Gold medal – first place	2010 Rodez	Individual
Bronze medal – third place	2008 Ulm	Trio
Pan American Championships
Gold medal – first place	2006 San Cristóbal	Individual
Gold medal – first place	2006 San Cristóbal	Trio
Gold medal – first place	2007 Morelos	Individual
Gold medal – first place	2010 Balneário Camboriú	Individual
Gold medal – first place	2010 Balneário Camboriú	Trio

Marcela Lopez (born October 13, 1982) is a Brazilian aerobic gymnast who finished 1st in the Women's Individual event at the 10th Aerobic Gymnastics World Championships held in Ulm
