= 2024 South American Aerobic Gymnastics Championships =

The 2024 South American Aerobic Gymnastics Championships was held in Aracaju, Brazil, from June 12 to 15, 2024. The competition was organized by the Brazilian Gymnastics Federation and approved by the International Gymnastics Federation.

== Medalists ==
Event	Gold	Silver	Bronze
Individual men	Lucas Barbosa (BRA)	Diego Ramirez (URU)	William Nascimento (BRA)
Individual women	Tamires Silva (BRA)	Bianca Henriquez (CHI)	Josefina Canales (PER)
Mixed pair	Brazil; Lucas Barbosa; Tamires Silva	Uruguay; Diego Ramirez; Julieta Perazza	Brazil; William Nascimento; Letícia Nunes
Trio	Peru	Peru	Chile
Group	Peru	Peru	Uruguay
Dance	Peru	Brazil	—N/a
