= 2025 South American Aerobic Gymnastics Championships =

The 2025 South American Aerobic Gymnastics Championships was held in Punta del Este, Uruguay, from June 16 to 22, 2025. The competition was organized by the Uruguayan Gymnastics Federation and approved by the International Gymnastics Federation.

== Medalists ==
| Event | Gold | Silver | Bronze |
|---|---|---|---|
| Individual men | Diego Ramirez (URU) | Joaquin Presa (ARG) | Mário Nunes (BRA) |
| Individual women | Guadalupe Aberastain (ARG) | Thais Fernandez (PER) | Julieta Perazza (URU) |
| Mixed pair | Brazil; Lucas Barbosa; Tamires Silva | Uruguay; Diego Ramirez; Julieta Perazza | Chile; Victor Retamal; Haylen Navarrete |
| Trio | Peru | Peru | Argentina |
| Group | Peru | Uruguay | — |
