= 1996 South American Artistic Gymnastics Championships =

International artistic gymnastics competition

The 1996 South American Artistic Gymnastics Championships were held in Santa Cruz de la Sierra, Bolivia, November 12–17, 1996.

== Medalists ==
Event	Gold	Silver	Bronze
Men
Team all-around	Argentina; Sergio Alvariño; Marcelo Palacio; Higinio de la Barrera; Gustavo Pisos	Colombia; Leonardo González; Jorge Giraldo; Alexander Rangel	Brazil; Cristiano Albino
Individual all-around	Leonardo González (COL)	Sergio Alvariño (ARG)	Marcelo Palacio (ARG)
Floor exercise	Marcelo Palacio (ARG)	Sergio Alvariño (ARG)	Leonardo González (COL)
Pommel horse	Alexander Rangel (COL)	Higino de la Barrera (ARG)	Marcelo Palacio (ARG)
Rings	Sergio Alvariño (ARG)	R. Gonzalez (VEN)	Cristiano Albino (BRA)
Vault	Cristiano Albino (BRA)	Unknown	Unknown
Parallel bars	Jorge Giraldo (COL)	Higino de la Barrera (ARG)	Cristiano Albino (BRA)
Horizontal bar	Caricel Briceño (VEN)	Leonardo González (COL)	Higino de la Barrera (ARG)
Women
Team all-around	Brazil; Leticia Ishii; Ursula Flores	Argentina; Romina Mazzoni; Jesica Neri; Lucia Mancioli	Colombia
Individual all-around	Romina Mazzoni (ARG)	Leticia Ishii (BRA)	Ursula Flores (BRA)
Vault	Romina Mazzoni (ARG)	Leticia Ishii (BRA)	Unknown
Uneven bars	Romina Mazzoni (ARG)	Unknown	Unknown
Balance beam	Romina Mazzoni (ARG)	Jesica Neri (ARG)	Unknown
Floor exercise	Romina Mazzoni (ARG)	Leticia Ishii (BRA)	Ursula Flores (BRA)
