= 2002 Junior Pan American Rhythmic Gymnastics Championships =

International sports competition

The 2002 Junior Pan American Rhythmic Gymnastics Championships was held in Santo Domingo, Dominican Republic, November 4–10, 2002.

== Medal summary ==
Event	Gold	Silver	Bronze
Team	United States; Bree McDonough; Alina Bakchajian; Alexandra Licona	Brazil; Karen Piccinin; Ana Paula Ribeiro; Mariana Borges	Canada; Stefany Carew; Jessica Krushen; Olisia Jakov
All-Around	Bree McDonough (USA)	Karen Piccinin (BRA)	Ana Paula Ribeiro (BRA) Analia Serenelli (ARG)
Hoop	Bree McDonough (USA)	Ana Paula Ribeiro (BRA)	Alexandra Licona (USA)
Ball	Bree McDonough (USA)	Ana Paula Ribeiro (BRA)	Karen Piccinin (BRA)
Clubs	Bree McDonough (USA)	Vanessa Robles (ARG)	Analia Serenelli (ARG)
Ribbon	Bree McDonough (USA)	Ana Paula Ribeiro (BRA)	Alina Bakchajian (USA)

== Medal table ==
Rank	Nation	Gold	Silver	Bronze	Total
1	United States	6	0	2	8
2	Brazil	0	5	2	7
3	Argentina	0	1	2	3
4	Canada	0	0	1	1
Totals (4 entries)		6	6	7	19
