= 1996 Junior Pan American Artistic Gymnastics Championships =

International sports competition

Junior Pan American Artistic Gymnastics Championships
- Location: Guatemala City, Guatemala
- Date: December 3–9, 1996

The 1996 Junior Pan American Artistic Gymnastics Championships was held in Guatemala City, Guatemala, December 3–9, 1996.

== Medal summary ==
| Event | Gold | Silver | Bronze |
|---|---|---|---|
Women
| Team | Brazil; Daniele Hypólito | United States; Lindsay Wing; Elise Ray; Carri Nagle; Melinda Baimbridge | Canada; Carly Dockendorf; Shannon Johnson |
| All Around | Lindsay Wing (USA) | Elise Ray (USA) | Daniele Hypólito (BRA) |
| Vault | Lindsay Wing (USA) | Romina Mazzoni (ARG) | Carly Dockendorf (CAN) |
| Uneven bars | Elise Ray (USA) | Lindsay Wing (USA) | Shannon Johnson (CAN) |
| Balance beam | Lindsay Wing (USA) | Daniele Hypólito (BRA) | Elise Ray (USA) |
| Floor exercise | Elise Ray (USA) | Romina Mazzoni (ARG) | Daniele Hypólito (BRA) |
Men
| Team | Cuba; Johandy Diaz; Adonis Vasquez | Canada; Alexander Jeltkov; John Hay; Justin Gerson; Rob Popkin | United States; Paul Hamm; Jamie Natalie; Sterling Richards; Kris Zimmerman |
| All Around | Alexander Jeltkov (CAN) | Johandy Diaz (CUB) | Adonis Vasquez (CUB) |
| Floor exercise | Johandy Diaz (CUB) | Eric Pedercini (ARG) | Sterling Richards (USA) |
| Pommel horse | Antonio Cesar (MEX) | Johandy Diaz (CUB) | John Hay (CAN) |
| Rings | Alexander Jeltkov (CAN) | Adonis Vasquez (CUB) | Ronald Gonzalez (VEN) Justin Gerson (CAN) |
| Vault | Alexander Jeltkov (CAN) | Johandy Diaz (CUB) | Gustavo da Fonte (BRA) |
| Parallel bars | Jorge Hugo Giraldo (COL) | Adonis Vasquez (CUB) | Rob Popkin (CAN) |
| Horizontal bar | John Hay (CAN) | Alexander Jeltkov (CAN) Julio Garcia (MEX) | — |

== Medal table ==
| Rank | Nation | Gold | Silver | Bronze | Total |
|---|---|---|---|---|---|
| 1 | United States | 5 | 3 | 3 | 11 |
| 2 | Canada | 4 | 2 | 6 | 12 |
| 3 | Cuba | 2 | 5 | 1 | 8 |
| 4 | Brazil | 1 | 1 | 3 | 5 |
| 5 | Mexico | 1 | 1 | 0 | 2 |
| 6 | Colombia | 1 | 0 | 0 | 1 |
| 7 | Argentina | 0 | 3 | 0 | 3 |
| 8 | Venezuela | 0 | 0 | 1 | 1 |
| Totals (8 entries) | | 14 | 15 | 14 | 43 |
