= 1990 Junior Pan American Rhythmic Gymnastics Championships =

International sports competition

The 1990 Junior Pan American Rhythmic Gymnastics Championships was held in Tallahassee, United States, July 16–23, 1990.

== Medal summary ==
=== Junior division ===
Event	Gold	Silver	Bronze
Team	United States; Naomi Hewitt-Couturier; Christy Neuman; Bianca Sapetto	Canada; Ivy Leishman; Paula Gaum; Camille Martens	Cuba; Yoxy Garcia Diaz; Daimelis Baez
All-Around	Naomi Hewitt-Couturier (USA)	Christy Neuman (USA)	Ivy Leishman (CAN)
Rope	Paula Gaum (CAN)	Bianca Sapetto (USA)	Julieta Torres (ARG) Ivy Leishman (CAN) Christy Neuman (USA)
Hoop	Naomi Hewitt-Couturier (USA)	Christy Neuman (USA) Yoxy Garcia Diaz (CUB)	—
Ball	Camille Martens (CAN)	Christy Neuman (USA) Ivy Leishman (CAN) Naomi Hewitt-Couturier (USA)	—
Clubs	Naomi Hewitt-Couturier (USA)	Christy Neuman (USA)	Yoxy Garcia Diaz (CUB) Daimelis Baez (CUB)

=== Children's division ===
Event	Gold	Silver	Bronze
Team	Canada; Lindsay Richards; Leela Hemmings; Simone Lazor	United States; Anna Keel; Lily Chiang; Bonnie Chang Argentina; Luciana Eslava; Carolina Rizzi; Natali Elbaum	—
All-Around	Mirie Napoles (CUB)	Lindsay Richards (CAN)	Anna Keel (USA) Leela Hemmings (CAN)
Rope	Lindsay Richards (CAN)	Anna Keel (USA)	Mirie Napoles (CUB)
Ball	Mirie Napoles (CUB)	Anna Keel (USA)	Luciana Eslava (ARG)

== Medal table ==
Rank	Nation	Gold	Silver	Bronze	Total
1	United States	4	9	2	15
2	Canada	4	3	3	10
3	Cuba	2	1	4	7
4	Argentina	0	1	2	3
Totals (4 entries)		10	14	11	35
