= 1969 South American Artistic Gymnastics Championships =

International artistic gymnastics competition

The 1969 South American Artistic Gymnastics Championships were held in Porto Alegre, Brazil, October 9–12, 1969. This was the second edition of the South American Artistic Gymnastics Championships, and for the first time women's events were also competed.

== Participating nations ==
- Argentina
- Brazil

== Medalists ==
| Event | Gold | Silver | Bronze |
|---|---|---|---|
Men
| Team all-around | Argentina; Carlos Pizzini; Hugo Pelatto; Juan Pecci; Orlando Auciello; Leopoldo Gavagnin | Brazil; Marcelino Pinent; Jairo Cordioli; Jairo Brandão; Nilson Olsson; Carlos Pinent | —N/a |
| Individual all-around | Carlos Pizzini (ARG) | Hugo Pelatto (ARG) | Marcelino Pinent (BRA) |
| Floor exercise | Unknown | Hugo Pelatto (ARG) | Unknown |
| Pommel horse | Carlos Pizzini (ARG) | Unknown | Unknown |
| Vault | Carlos Pizzini (ARG) | Unknown | Unknown |
| Parallel bars | Carlos Pizzini (ARG) | Unknown | Unknown |
| Horizontal bar | Carlos Pizzini (ARG) | Unknown | Unknown |
Women
| Team all-around | Brazil; Silvia Pinent; Berenice Arruda; Eneida Flecha; Yumi Yamamoto; Dayse Brandão; Maria Martini | Argentina; Marta Deschamps; Elizabeth Kranner; Friga Kleiss; Tiziana Pietrangelli | —N/a |
| Individual all-around | Silvia Pinent (BRA) | Berenice Arruda (BRA) | Eneida Flecha (BRA) |
