= 2023 South American Aerobic Gymnastics Championships =

The 2023 South American Aerobic Gymnastics Championships were held in Punta del Este, Uruguay, from June 28 to July 3, 2023. The competition was organized by the Uruguayan Gymnastics Federation and approved by the International Gymnastics Federation.

== Medalists ==
Event	Gold	Silver	Bronze
Individual men	Lucas Barbosa (BRA)	Kevin Riveros (ARG)	Marcelo Arouche (BRA)
Individual women	Tamires Silva (BRA)	Thais Fernandez (PER)	Bianca Henriquez (CHI)
Mixed pair	Brazil; Lucas Barbosa; Tamires Silva	Argentina; Henry Garcia; Brenda Weber	Chile; Giovanni Espinoza; Paula Zuñiga
Trio	Peru	Chile	Argentina
Group	Argentina	Peru	—N/a
Team	Argentina	Uruguay	Brazil
