= 2000 Junior Pan American Rhythmic Gymnastics Championships =

International sports competition

The 2000 Junior Pan American Rhythmic Gymnastics Championships was held in San Felipe, Venezuela, October 9–15, 2000.

== Medal summary ==
| Event | Gold | Silver | Bronze |
|---|---|---|---|
| Team | United States; Brenann Stacker; Jacquelyn Jampolsky; Taryn Look | Brazil; Tayanne Mantovanelli; Larissa Barata; Juliana Rodrigues | Canada; Alexandra Orlando; Judy Berecz; Kelemoi Tedeneke |
| All-Around | Alexandra Orlando (CAN) | Catherine Cortez (VEN) | Brenann Stacker (USA) |
| Rope | Catherine Cortez (VEN) | Alexandra Orlando (CAN) | Larissa Barata (BRA) |
| Hoop | Catherine Cortez (VEN) | Alexandra Orlando (CAN) | Eugenia Gamboa (MEX) Xiolisbeth Griman (VEN) Jacquelyn Jampolsky (USA) |
| Ball | Alexandra Orlando (CAN) | Catherine Cortez (VEN) | Brenann Stacker (USA) |
| Clubs | Catherine Cortez (VEN) | Alexandra Orlando (CAN) | Tayanne Mantovanelli (BRA) |
| Group | Venezuela | United States | Canada |
