= 2007 Junior Pan American Rhythmic Gymnastics Championships =

International sports competition

The 2007 Junior Pan American Rhythmic Gymnastics Championships was held in San Cristóbal, Venezuela, October 4–7, 2007.

== Medal summary ==
Event	Gold	Silver	Bronze
Team	Mexico; Fernanda Zertuche; Alejandra Vázquez; Yeraldine Alarcón	Argentina; Ayelen Páez; Evelyn Mast; Gabriela Herbon	Venezuela; Michelle Sánchez; Kimberly Ordóñez
Individual all-around	Fernanda Zertuche (MEX)	Ayelen Páez (ARG)	Alejandra Vázquez (MEX)
Rope	Unknown	Evelyn Mast (ARG)	Unknown
Ball	Unknown	Ayelen Páez (ARG)	Unknown
Ribbon	Unknown	Gabriela Herbon (ARG)	Unknown
