= 1987 Junior Pan American Rhythmic Gymnastics Championships =

International sports competition

The 1987 Junior Pan American Rhythmic Gymnastics Championships was held in Barquisimeto, Venezuela. The event was originally scheduled to take place in 1986, but was ultimately held from February 20 to 28, 1987.

== Medal summary ==
Event	Gold	Silver	Bronze
Rope	Dacon Lister (USA)	Alexandra Feldman (USA)	Claudia Corrié (VEN)
Hoop	Dacon Lister (USA)	Alexandra Feldman (USA)	Kelly Tanko (USA)
Ball	Zoila Robles (PER)	Claudia Corrié (VEN)	Maria de la Puente (PER)
Ribbon	Alexandra Feldman (USA)	Kelly Tanko (USA)	Darling Navas (VEN)

== Medal table ==
Rank	Nation	Gold	Silver	Bronze	Total
1	United States	3	3	1	7
2	Peru	1	0	1	2
3	Venezuela	0	1	2	3
Totals (3 entries)		4	4	4	12
