= 2011 Pan American Aerobic Gymnastics Championships =

The 2011 Pan American Aerobic Gymnastics Championships were held in Yaracuy, Venezuela, August 2–8, 2011.

== Medalists ==
Event	Gold	Silver	Bronze
Individual men	Iván Veloz (MEX)	Leonardo Perez (ARG)	Osvaldo Solis (MEX)
Individual women	Daiana Nanzer (ARG)	Sol Magdaleno (ARG)	Lorenz Durán (VEN)
Mixed pair	Daiana Nanzer (ARG); Leonardo Perez (ARG)	Lorenz Durán (VEN); Marcos Fuentes (VEN)	Jean Ruiz (VEN); Vanessa Guerra (VEN)
Trio	Mexico; Aldrin Rodriguez; Osvaldo Solis; Iván Veloz	Argentina; Rocio Veliz; Barbara Rivas; Sol Magdaleno	Venezuela; Yelu Ballestas; Lenin Chevez; Denjoset Navarro
Group	Argentina; Rocio Veliz; Barbara Rivas; Sol Magdaleno; Silvina Gun; Amilcar Corti; Antonio Nahuel	Venezuela; Yelu Ballestas; Lenin Chevez; Denjoset Navarro; Zoranyi Baquero; Andres Santamaria; Marlon Brito	Venezuela; Lorenz Durán; Marcos Fuentes; Reiner Bazan; Dimas Marin; Alejandra Castejon; Animsay Parra
