= 2006 Junior Pan American Rhythmic Gymnastics Championships =

International sports competition

The 2006 Junior Pan American Rhythmic Gymnastics Championships was held in Toronto, Canada, August 27–29, 2006.

== Medal summary ==
Event	Gold	Silver	Bronze
Team	United States; Anastasia Torba; Rachel Marmer; Marlee Shape	Canada; Demetra Mantcheva; Jessica Ho; Rose Cossar	Mexico; Sofia Sanchez
All-Around	Angelica Kvieczynski (BRA)	Rachel Marmer (USA)	Sofia Sanchez (MEX)
Rope	Rachel Marmer (USA)	Angelica Kvieczynski (BRA)	Marlee Shape (USA)
Hoop	Rachel Marmer (USA)	Demetra Mantcheva (CAN)	Angelica Kvieczynski (BRA) Natália Gaudio (BRA)
Clubs	Angelica Kvieczynski (BRA)	Rachel Marmer (USA)	Marlee Shape (USA)
Ribbon	Rachel Marmer (USA)	Angelica Kvieczynski (BRA)	Natália Gaudio (BRA)
Group	Canada	Brazil	Mexico

== Medal table ==
Rank	Nation	Gold	Silver	Bronze	Total
1	United States	4	2	2	8
2	Brazil	2	3	3	8
3	Canada	1	2	0	3
4	Mexico	0	0	3	3
Totals (4 entries)		7	7	8	22
