= 2012 Junior Pan American Rhythmic Gymnastics Championships =

International sports competition

The 2012 Junior Pan American Rhythmic Gymnastics Championships was held in Córdoba, Argentina, August 28–September 2, 2012.

== Medal summary ==
Event	Gold	Silver	Bronze
Team	Brazil; Andressa Jardim; Mayra Siñeriz; Stephany Gonçalves; Bruna da Silva	Canada; Patricia Bezzoubenko; Kaylie Choi; Carmen Whelan; Lisa Huh	Mexico; Edna Garcia; Cindy Gallegos; Marialicia Ortega
Individual all-around	Patricia Bezzoubenko (CAN)	Andressa Jardim (BRA)	Mayra Siñeriz (BRA)
Hoop	Andressa Jardim (BRA)	Patricia Bezzoubenko (CAN)	Edna Garcia (MEX)
Ball	Andressa Jardim (BRA)	Patricia Bezzoubenko (CAN)	Carmen Whelan (CAN)
Clubs	Patricia Bezzoubenko (CAN)	Andressa Jardim (BRA)	Melissa Kinderlan (CUB)
Ribbon	Patricia Bezzoubenko (CAN)	Andressa Jardim (BRA)	Edna Garcia (MEX)
Group all-around	United States	Brazil	Canada
5 ropes	United States	Mexico	Brazil
5 balls	United States	Canada	Mexico
