= 2024 Pan American Trampoline and Tumbling Championships =

International sports competition

The 2024 Pan American Trampoline and Tumbling Championships were held in Lima, Peru, from May 17 to 19, 2024. The competition was organized by the Peruvian Gymnastics Federation and approved by the International Gymnastics Federation.

== Medalists ==
=== Senior ===
Event	Gold	Silver	Bronze
Men
Individual trampoline	(Argentina) Santiago Ferrari	(United States) Elijah Vogel	(United States) Cody Gesuelli
Synchronized trampoline	(United States) Cody Gesuelli (United States) Paul Bretscher	(Brazil) Lucas Tobias (Brazil) Gabriel Sousa	(Canada) Alexan Adjemian (Canada) Etienne Cloutier
Trampoline team	Mexico; David Carballo; Jose Hugo Marín; Sergio Serrano	Brazil; Vinicius Celestino; Wallace Celestino; Gabriel Sousa; Lucas Tobias	Argentina; Santiago Ferrari; Tomas Roberti; Tobias Weise
Double mini	(Canada) Simon Neufeld	(Argentina) Santiago Ferrari	(Argentina) Tobias Weise
Women
Individual trampoline	(United States) Ava Dehanes	(Brazil) Maria Luiza Oliveira	(Canada) Rielle Bonne
Synchronized trampoline	(Mexico) Mariola Garcia (Mexico) Dafne Navarro	(United States) Ava Dehanes (United States) Leah Edelman	(Brazil) Maria Luiza Marcante (Brazil) Luara Rezende
Trampoline team	United States; Ava Dehanes; Leah Edelman; Logan McCoy; Trinity Van Natta	Canada; Rielle Bonne; Kasha Noga-Bard; Kalena Soehn	Mexico; Veronica Borges; Mariola Garcia; Michelle Mares; Patricia Nuñez
Double mini	(Canada) Kalena Soehn	(Canada) Mckayla Maureen	(Bolivia) Maya Quinteros

=== Junior ===
Event	Gold	Silver	Bronze
Men
Individual trampoline	(Brazil) Arthur Ferreira	(United States) Nate Erkert	(Mexico) Jorge Montijo
Synchronized trampoline	(Brazil) Icaro Amorim (Brazil) Arthur Ferreira	(Mexico) Roberto Gutierrez (Mexico) Santiago Gutierrez	(United States) Rafael Pikofsky-Christiansen (United States) Mick Seyler
Double mini	(Canada) Tristan Bloom	(Argentina) Santiago Verasay	Not awarded
Women
Individual trampoline	(United States) Alexandra Mytnik	(United States) Grace Danley	(Brazil) Gabriela Rodrigues
Synchronized trampoline	(United States) Grace Danley (United States) Annabella Ursu	(Brazil) Julia Silva (Brazil) Eduarda Vicente	(Bolivia) Ariana Asper (Bolivia) Luciana Meneses
Double mini	(Canada) Brooklyn Lee-Mcmeeken	(Brazil) Maria Carvalho	(Bolivia) Ariana Asper

== Medal table ==
* Host nation (Peru)

Rank	Nation	Gold	Silver	Bronze	Total
1	United States	5	4	2	11
2	Canada	4	2	2	8
3	Brazil	2	5	2	9
4	Mexico	2	1	2	5
5	Argentina	1	2	2	5
6	Bolivia	0	0	3	3
Totals (6 entries)		14	14	13	41
