= 2010 Pan American Aerobic Gymnastics Championships =

International sports competition

The 2010 Pan American Aerobic Gymnastics Championships were held in Balneário Camboriú, Brazil, November 18–21, 2010. The competition was organized by the Brazilian Gymnastics Federation, and approved by the International Gymnastics Federation.

== Medalists ==
Event	Gold	Silver	Bronze
Individual men	Iván Veloz (MEX)	Marcisnei Oliveira (BRA)	Marcos Fuentes (VEN)
Individual women	Marcela Lopez (BRA)	Carolina Oliveira (BRA)	Daiana Nanzer (ARG)
Mixed pair	Daiana Nanzer (ARG); Leonardo Perez (ARG)	Sol Magdaleno (ARG); Martin Brizzi (ARG)	Jean Ruiz (VEN); Vanessa Guerra (VEN)
Trio	Brazil; Marcela Lopez; Cibele Rosito; Marina Lopez	Brazil; Lorena Dias; Marcisnei Oliveira; Carolina Oliveira	Argentina; Yanina Muratore; Barbara Rivas; Sol Magdaleno
Group	Argentina	Brazil	Chile
Team	Brazil	Argentina	Venezuela
