= 1988 Junior Pan American Rhythmic Gymnastics Championships =

International sports competition

The 1988 Junior Pan American Rhythmic Gymnastics Championships was held in Salinas, Puerto Rico, August 8, 1988.

== Medal summary ==
=== Junior division ===
Event	Gold	Silver	Bronze
Team	Canada	United States	Brazil
All-Around	Jenifer Lovell (USA)	Madonna Gimotea (CAN)	Miyeko Yamashita (CAN)

=== Children's division ===
Event	Gold	Silver	Bronze
All-Around	Kim Johnson (CAN)	Franca Abbatiello (USA)	Lindsay Richards (CAN)
