= 1994 Junior Pan American Artistic Gymnastics Championships =

International sports competition

Junior Pan American Artistic Gymnastics Championships
- Location: Monterrey, Mexico
- Date: September 20–22, 1994

The 1994 Junior Pan American Artistic Gymnastics Championships was held in Monterrey, Mexico, September 20–22, 1994.

== Medal summary ==
Event	Gold	Silver	Bronze
Women
Team	United States; Andreé Pickens; Tara Tagliarino; Marissa Medal; Deidra Graham	Canada	Argentina
All Around	Andreé Pickens (USA)	Tara Tagliarino (USA)	Marissa Medal (USA) Katie Rowland (CAN)
Vault	Unknown	Andreé Pickens (USA)	Unknown
Uneven bars	Unknown	Tara Tagliarino (USA) Deidra Graham (USA)	—
Balance beam	Marissa Medal (USA) Deidra Graham (USA)	—	Andreé Pickens (USA)
Floor exercise	Andreé Pickens (USA)	Unknown	Tara Tagliarino (USA)
Men
Team	United States; Mike Morgan; Mike Dutka; Jason Katsampes; Tim Elsner	Argentina	Mexico
All Around	Mike Morgan (USA)	Mike Dutka (USA)	Jason Katsampes (USA)
Floor exercise	Mike Dutka (USA)	Unknown	Unknown
Pommel horse	Mike Dutka (USA) Jason Katsampes (USA)	—	Unknown
Rings	Unknown	Mike Morgan (USA)	Unknown
Vault	Mike Morgan (USA)	Unknown	Unknown
Parallel bars	Mike Dutka (USA)	Jason Katsampes (USA)	Unknown
Horizontal bar	Mike Dutka (USA)	Unknown	Unknown

== Medal table ==
Rank	Nation	Gold	Silver	Bronze	Total
1	United States	13	7	4	24
2	Argentina	0	1	1	2
2	Canada	0	1	1	2
4	Mexico	0	0	1	1
Totals (4 entries)		13	9	7	29
