= 1987 Junior Pan American Artistic Gymnastics Championships =

International sports competition

Junior Pan American Artistic Gymnastics Championships
- Location: Barquisimeto, Venezuela
- Date: February 20–28, 1987

The 1987 Junior Pan American Artistic Gymnastics Championships was held in Barquisimeto, Venezuela. The event was originally scheduled to take place in 1986, but was ultimately held from February 20 to 28, 1987.

== Medal summary ==
Event	Gold	Silver	Bronze
Women
Vault	Adriana Carrera (VEN)	Oriana Méndez (VEN)	Catalina Sierra (COL)
Uneven bars	Oriana Méndez (VEN)	Carla Egurriola (GUA)	Mailara Santana (PUR)
Balance beam	Oriana Méndez (VEN)	Carola Robles (PER)	Mailara Santana (PUR)
Floor exercise	Oriana Méndez (VEN)	Ruby Smith (PER)	Marianela Garboreche (PER)
Men
Team	United States; Adam Cooper; Terry Notary; Trent Dimas	Puerto Rico	Venezuela
All-around	Adam Cooper (USA)	Trent Dimas (USA)	Terry Notary (USA)
