= 1992 Junior Pan American Rhythmic Gymnastics Championships =

International sports competition

The 1992 Junior Pan American Rhythmic Gymnastics Championships was held in São Paulo, Brazil, December 8–14, 1992.

== Medal summary ==
=== Junior division ===
Event	Gold	Silver	Bronze
Team	Canada; Lindsay Richards; Erika Stirton	United States; Christi Tucay; Sally Ward; Jessica Davis	Argentina; Noelia Ali; Alejandra Unsain
All-Around	Lindsay Richards (CAN)	Erika Stirton (CAN)	Christi Tucay (USA)
Hoop	Erika Stirton (CAN)	Noelia Ali (ARG)	Alejandra Unsain (ARG)
Ball	Lindsay Richards (CAN)	Noelia Ali (ARG)	Danas Canela (CUB)
Clubs	Alejandra Unsain (ARG)	Erika Stirton (CAN)	Lindsay Richards (CAN)
Ribbon	Lindsay Richards (CAN)	Noelia Ali (ARG) Danas Canela (CUB)	—

=== Children's division ===
Event	Gold	Silver	Bronze
Team	Argentina; Luciana Eslava; Maria de los Angeles; Maria Cobo	Canada; Andrea Sellen	United States; Tina Tharp; Kelsi Kemper; Jennifer Lim
All-Around	Luciana Eslava (ARG)	Andrea Sellen (CAN)	Maria de los Angeles (ARG)
Rope	Luciana Eslava (ARG)	Andrea Sellen (CAN)	Arletis Seull (CUB)
Hoop	Luciana Eslava (ARG)	Andrea Sellen (CAN)	Tina Tharp (USA)
Ball	Arletis Seull (CUB)	Maria Cobo (ARG)	Luciana Eslava (ARG)
