= 2021 Pan American Aerobic Gymnastics Championships =

International sports competition

The 2021 Pan American Aerobic Gymnastics Championships were held in Oaxtepec, Mexico, from December 10 to 13, 2021. The competition was approved by the International Gymnastics Federation.

== Medalists ==
=== Senior ===
Event	Gold	Silver	Bronze
Individual men	Lucas Barbosa (BRA)	Iván Veloz (MEX)	Kevin Riveros (ARG)
Individual women	Tamires Santos (BRA)	Thais Fernandez (PER)	Catalina Juri (ARG)
Mixed pairs	Brazil	Argentina	Argentina
Trio	Peru	Peru	Chile
Group	Argentina	Peru	Argentina
Dance	Mexico	—	—
