= 1996 Junior Pan American Rhythmic Gymnastics Championships =

International sports competition

The 1996 Junior Pan American Rhythmic Gymnastics Championships was held in Guatemala City, Guatemala, December 5–8, 1996.

== Medal summary ==
Event	Gold	Silver	Bronze
Team	Canada; Emilie Livingston; Julie Lombara	United States; Kate Jeffress; Johanna Shoemaker; Kassy Scharringhausen; Tara McCargo	Brazil; Kizzy Antualpa; Alice Sirângelo; Priscila Roland; Fernanda Umpierre
All-Around	Kate Jeffress (USA)	Emilie Livingston (CAN) Julie Lombara (CAN)	—N/a
Rope	Emilie Livingston (CAN)	Anahi Sosa (ARG) Kate Jeffress (USA)	—N/a
Hoop	Emilie Livingston (CAN) Kate Jeffress (USA)	—N/a	Lorena Garrocq (ARG)
Clubs	Emilie Livingston (CAN) Julie Lombara (CAN)	—N/a	Johanna Shoemaker (USA)
Ribbon	Emilie Livingston (CAN) Kate Jeffress (USA)	—N/a	Julie Lombara (CAN)
