= 1969 Copa de las Americas =

The 1969 Copa de las Americas (Cup of the Americas) was an artistic gymnastics tournament held in Mexico City, Mexico, July 12–15, 1969. The competition was a follow-up to the North American Championships, held from 1964 until 1968, and changed its name from North American Championships to Cup of the Americas so that South American countries would be allowed to enter. At least one South American nation, Brazil, intended to compete, but eventually the event was attended only by North American nations.

== Participating nations ==
- Canada
- Cuba
- Mexico
- United States

== Medalists ==
=== Artistic gymnastics ===
Event	Gold	Silver	Bronze
Men
Team all-around	United States	Cuba	Canada
Individual all-around	Dave Thor (USA)	Richard Tucker (USA)	Paul Tickenoff (USA)
Floor exercise	Dave Thor (USA)	Unknown	Unknown
Pommel horse	Dave Thor (USA)	Richard Tucker (USA)	Fred Dennis (USA)
Rings	Fred Turoff (USA)	Fred Dennis (USA)	Sid Jensen (CAN)
Vault	Jorge Cuervo (CUB)	Dave Thor (USA)	Paul Tickenoff (USA)
Parallel bars	Dave Thor (USA)	Paul Tickenoff (USA)	Andres Gonzalez (CUB)
Horizontal bar	Richard Tucker (USA)	Dave Thor (USA)	Sid Jensen (CAN)
Women
Team all-around	United States	Canada	Cuba
Individual all-around	Linda Metheny (USA)	Joyce Tanac (USA)	Jeannette Boyd (USA)
Vault	Jennifer Diachun (CAN)	Joyce Tanac (USA)	Glenna Sebastyn (CAN)
Uneven bars	Linda Metheny (USA)	Joyce Tanac (USA)	Jeannette Boyd (USA)
Balance beam	Joyce Tanac (USA)	Zulema Bregado (CUB)	Linda Metheny (USA)
Floor exercise	Linda Metheny (USA)	Zulema Bregado (CUB) Nancy Aldama (USA)	Jeannette Boyd (USA)
