= 2015 Pan American Aerobic Gymnastics Championships =

International sports competition

The 2015 Pan American Aerobic Gymnastics Championships were held in Oaxtepec, Mexico, December 13–19, 2015. The competition was organized by the Mexican Gymnastics Federation, and approved by the International Gymnastics Federation.

== Participating countries ==
- Argentina
- Brazil
- Mexico
- Peru
- United States

== Medalists ==
Event	Gold	Silver	Bronze
Individual men	Iván Veloz (MEX)	José de Oliveira (BRA)	Edson Nunes (BRA)
Individual women	Daiana Nanzer (ARG)	Luamar Martin (BRA)	Lucila Medina (ARG)
Mixed pair	Argentina	Argentina	Mexico
Trio	Brazil	Argentina	Argentina
Group	Argentina	Argentina	Mexico
Aero-dance	Argentina	Argentina	Mexico
Team	Brazil	Argentina	Mexico
