= 2013 South American Aerobic Gymnastics Championships =

South American aerobic gymnastics Championship

The 2013 South American Aerobic Gymnastics Championships were held in Cali, Colombia, July 27–30, 2013. The competition was organized by the Colombian Gymnastics Federation, and approved by the International Gymnastics Federation.

== Participating countries ==
- Argentina
- Brazil
- Chile
- Colombia
- Peru
- Venezuela

== Medalists ==
Event	Gold	Silver	Bronze
Individual men	Alejandro Castejon (VEN)	Orlando Parra (VEN)	Carlos Prieto (COL)
Individual women	Daiana Nanzer (ARG)	Lorenz Duran (VEN)	Andrea Plaza (VEN)
Mixed pair	Venezuela	Chile	Colombia
Trio	Colombia	Argentina	Venezuela
