= 2019 Pan American Acrobatic Gymnastics Championships =

International sports competition

The 3rd Pan American Acrobatic Gymnastics Championships were held in Monterrey, Mexico from November 22 to 24, 2019. The competition was organized by the Mexican Gymnastics Federation and approved by the International Gymnastics Federation.

== Participating nations ==
- Brazil (Junior and age groups)
- Canada (Junior and age groups)
- Mexico (Age groups)
- Puerto Rico (Age groups)
- United States (Senior, junior and age groups)

== Results ==
=== Senior ===
Event	Gold	Silver	Bronze
Men's Pair Balance	United States	—	—
Men's Pair Dynamic	United States	—	—
Men's Pair Combined	United States	—	—
Men's Pair All-Around	United States	—	—
Women's Group Balance	United States	—	—
Women's Group Dynamic	United States	—	—
Women's Group Combined	United States	—	—
Women's Group All-Around	United States	—	—

=== Junior and age groups ===
Event	Gold	Silver	Bronze
Age Group 1 Men's Pair Balance	Mexico	—	—
Age Group 1 Men's Pair Dynamic	Mexico	—	—
Age Group 1 Women's Pair Balance	United States	Canada	Canada
Age Group 1 Women's Pair Dynamic	United States	Canada	United States
Age Group 1 Women's Group Balance	United States	Canada	United States
Age Group 1 Women's Group Dynamic	United States	United States	Canada
Age Group 2 Women's Pair Balance	United States	Brazil	—
Age Group 2 Women's Pair Dynamic	United States	Brazil	—
Age Group 2 Women's Pair Combined	United States	Brazil	—
Age Group 2 Women's Pair All-Around	United States	Brazil	—
Age Group 2 Men's Pair Balance	Canada	—	—
Age Group 2 Men's Pair Dynamic	Canada	—	—
Age Group 2 Men's Pair Combined	Canada	—	—
Age Group 2 Men's Pair All-Around	Canada	—	—
Age Group 2 Mixed Pair Balance	Canada	United States	Puerto Rico
Age Group 2 Mixed Pair Dynamic	Canada	United States	Puerto Rico
Age Group 2 Mixed Pair Combined	Canada	United States	Puerto Rico
Age Group 2 Mixed Pair All-Around	Canada	United States	Puerto Rico
Age Group 2 Women's Group Balance	United States	Canada	Canada
Age Group 2 Women's Group Dynamic	United States	Canada	United States
Age Group 2 Women's Group Combined	Canada	United States	United States
Age Group 2 Women's Group All-Around	United States	Canada	United States
Junior Women's Pair Balance	United States	Brazil	—
Junior Women's Pair Dynamic	United States	Brazil	—
Junior Women's Pair Combined	United States	Brazil	—
Junior Women's Pair All-Around	United States	Brazil	—
Junior Mixed Pair Balance	United States	—	—
Junior Mixed Pair Dynamic	United States	—	—
Junior Mixed Pair Combined	United States	—	—
Junior Mixed Pair All-Around	United States	—	—
Junior Women's Group Balance	United States	Canada	Brazil
Junior Women's Group Dynamic	United States	Canada	Brazil
Junior Women's Group Combined	United States	Canada	Brazil
Junior Women's Group All-Around	United States	Canada	Brazil

== Medal table ==
Rank	Nation	Gold	Silver	Bronze	Total
1	United States	31	6	5	42
2	Canada	9	10	3	22
3	Mexico	2	0	0	2
4	Brazil	0	8	4	12
5	Puerto Rico	0	0	4	4
Totals (5 entries)		42	24	16	82
