= 2006 Pan American Aerobic Gymnastics Championships =

International sports competition

The 2006 Pan American Aerobic Gymnastics Championships were held in San Cristóbal, Venezuela, December 12–17, 2006. The competition was organized by the Venezuelan Gymnastics Federation.

== Medalists ==
Event	Gold	Silver	Bronze
Individual women	Marcela Lopez (BRA)	Unknown	Lorena Lopez (ARG)
Mixed pair	Unknown	Unknown	Lorena Luisio (ARG); Jorge Fillon (ARG)
Trio	Brazil; Marcela Lopez; Cibele Oliani; Marcela Matos	Unknown	Unknown
Group	Argentina; Lorena Luisio; Jorge Fillon; Amilcar Corti; Florencia Riopa; Barbara Rivas; Matin Brizzi	Unknown	Unknown
Team	Brazil	Venezuela	Argentina
