= 2017 Pan American Aerobic Gymnastics Championships =

International sports competition

The 2017 Pan American Aerobic Gymnastics Championships were held in Bogotá, Colombia, October 27–29, 2017. The competition was organized by the Colombian Gymnastics Federation, and approved by the International Gymnastics Federation.

== Participating countries ==
- Argentina
- Brazil
- Chile
- Colombia
- Mexico
- Peru
- Venezuela

== Medalists ==
Event	Gold	Silver	Bronze
Individual men	Iván Veloz (MEX)	Lucas Barbosa (BRA)	Jose Oliveira (BRA)
Individual women	Daiana Nanzer (ARG)	Daniela Pinto (ARG)	Thais Fernandez (PER)
Mixed pairs	Brazil	Brazil	Argentina
Trio	Argentina	Mexico	Brazil
Group	Argentina	Argentina	Mexico
Aerodance	Mexico	Brazil	Mexico
