= 2009 Pan American Aerobic Gymnastics Championships =

International sports competition

The 2009 Pan American Aerobic Gymnastics Championships were held in Morelos, Mexico. The competition was organized by the Mexican Gymnastics Federation.

== Medalists ==
Event	Gold	Silver	Bronze
Individual men	Iván Veloz (MEX)	Unknown	Martin Brizzi (ARG)
Individual women	Daiana Nanzer (ARG)	Carolina Oliveira (BRA)	Andrea Plaza (VEN)
Mixed pair	Argentina	Unknown	Argentina
Trio	Unknown	Unknown	Argentina
Group	Argentina	Mexico	Mexico
