= 2015 South American Trampoline Championships =

The 2015 South American Trampoline Championships were held in Bogotá, Colombia, October 29 – November 2, 2015. The competition was organized by the Colombian Gymnastics Federation and approved by the International Gymnastics Federation.

== Medalists ==
Event	Gold	Silver	Bronze
Men's synchronized trampoline	Ángel Hernández (COL); Alvaro Calero (COL)	Vladimir Hoyos (VEN); Nelson Ramirez (VEN)	Edwin Quintero (COL); Juan Carlos Valcarcel (COL)
Women's synchronized trampoline	Carolayn Lopez (VEN); Alida Rojo (VEN)	Mara Colombo (ARG); Marianela Galli (ARG)	Katish Hernandez (COL); Luisa Mercado (COL)
Men's trampoline team	Venezuela; Vladimir Hoyos; Nelson Ramirez; Santiago Marcano	Argentina; Lucas Adorno; Bernardo Aquino; Federico Cury	Colombia; Ángel Hernández; Edwin Quintero; Alvaro Calero; Juan Carlos Valcarcel
Women's trampoline team	Brazil; Larissa Aladim; Ingrid Maior; Marcela Martins	Argentina; Mara Colombo; Marianela Galli; Ludmila Skovich; Julieta Espeche	Colombia; Katish Hernandez; Luisa Mercado; Paola Suarez
Men's individual trampoline	Alvaro Calero (COL)	Lucas Adorno (ARG)	Federico Cury (ARG)
Women's individual trampoline	Katish Hernandez (COL)	Larissa Aladim (BRA)	Alida Rojo (VEN)
Men's double mini trampoline	Federico Cury (ARG)	Mario Santana (BRA)	Juan Carlos Valcarcel (COL)
Women's double mini trampoline	Mara Colombo (ARG)	Marianela Galli (ARG)	Juana Abriola (ARG)
