= 2024 South American Trampoline Championships =

The 2024 South American Trampoline Championships were held in Barranquilla, Colombia, from September 23 to 29, 2024. The competition was organized by the Colombian Gymnastics Federation and approved by the International Gymnastics Federation.

== Medalists ==
Event	Gold	Silver	Bronze
Men
Men's individual trampoline	Wallace Celestino (BRA)	Vinícius Celestino (BRA)	Tobias Weise (ARG)
Men's synchronized trampoline	Tobias Weise (ARG); Agustín Messuti (ARG)	Diego Giraldo (COL); Cristian Nieto (COL)	Gabriel Gomes (BRA); Gabriel Ferreira (BRA)
Men's double mini	Santiago Ferrari (ARG)	Matias Pacheco (ARG)	Deyvison Gonçalves (BRA)
Men's tumbling	Emanuel Lofiego (ARG)	Jheferson Torres (PER)	Ezequias Baez (ARG)
Women
Women's individual trampoline	Nicole Castellanos (COL)	Alma Figueredo (ARG)	Lucila Maldonado (ARG)
Women's synchronized trampoline	Nicole Castellanos (COL); Anny Sánchez (COL)	Isabel Goon Lan (PAN); Maria Corbett (PAN)	Alma Figueredo (ARG); Yazmin Roberts (ARG)
Women's double mini	Alma Figueredo (ARG)	Yazmin Roberts (ARG)	—
Women's tumbling	Julieta Logarzo (ARG)	Paula Alvarez (ARG)	Maria Jose Sanchez (ECU)
