= 2023 South American Trampoline Championships =

The 2023 South American Trampoline Championships were held in Bariloche, Rio Negro, Argentina, from September 8 to 10, 2023. The competition was organized by the Argentine Gymnastics Federation and approved by the International Gymnastics Federation.

== Medalists ==
Event	Gold	Silver	Bronze
Men's individual trampoline	Vinícius Celestino (BRA)	Matias Pacheco (ARG)	Tobias Weise (ARG)
Women's individual trampoline	Nicole Castellanos (COL)	Lucila Maldonado (ARG)	Ana Pereira Soares (BRA)
Men's synchronized trampoline	Santiago Ferrari (ARG); Tomas Roberti (ARG)	Joel Yzquierdo (PER); Miguel Valencia (PER)	Vinícius Celestino (BRA); Wallace Celestino (BRA)
Women's synchronized trampoline	Ana Pereira Soares (BRA); Maria Lopes Oliveira (BRA)	Alma Figueredo (ARG); Martina Quintana (ARG)	Nicole Castellanos (COL); Gilary Riascos (COL)
Men's trampoline team	Brazil; Vinícius Celestino; Wallace Celestino; Gabriel Sousa; Lucas Tobias	Argentina; Santiago Ferrari; Matias Pacheco; Tomas Roberti; Tobias Weise	Peru; Miguel Valencia; David Figueroa; Joel Yzquierdo
Men's double mini trampoline	Matias Pacheco (ARG)	Santiago Ferrari (ARG)	Delmar Marcos (BRA)
Women's double mini trampoline	Maya Quinteros (BOL)	Florencia Braun (ARG)	Gabriela Pizarro (PER)
Men's tumbling	Erick Ledesma (ECU)	Ignacio Torres (ARG)	Diego Vilcas (PER)
