= 2009 South American Rhythmic Gymnastics Championships =

International rhythmic gymnastics competition

The 2009 South American Rhythmic Gymnastics Championships were held in Guayaquil, Ecuador, December 14–20, 2009. The competition was organized by the Ecuadorian Gymnastics Federation.

== Participating nations ==
- Argentina
- Bolivia
- Chile
- Colombia
- Ecuador
- Venezuela

== Medalists ==
Senior

Event	Gold	Silver	Bronze
Team all-around	Argentina	Unknown	Unknown
Individual all-around	Darya Shara (ARG)	Ayelén Páez (ARG)	Florencia Aracama (ARG)
Rope	Darya Shara (ARG)	Ayelén Páez (ARG)	Unknown
Hoop	Ayelén Páez (ARG)	Florencia Aracama (ARG)	Unknown
Ball	Darya Shara (ARG)	Florencia Aracama (ARG)	Unknown
Ribbon	Darya Shara (ARG)	Ayelén Páez (ARG)	Unknown
