= 2014 South American Aerobic Gymnastics Championships =

The 2014 South American Aerobic Gymnastics Championships were held in Asunción, Paraguay, November 25–30, 2014. The competition was organized by the Paraguayan Gymnastics Federation.

== Participating countries ==
- Argentina
- Brazil
- Chile
- Colombia
- Paraguay
- Peru

== Medalists ==
Event	Gold	Silver	Bronze
Individual men	Lucas Barbosa (BRA)	John Medina (COL)	Edson Nunes (BRA)
Individual women	Daiana Nanzer (ARG)	Jessica Lemes (BRA)	Luamar Martin (BRA)
Mixed pair	Brazil	Colombia	Unknown
Trio	Argentina	Brazil	Argentina
Group	Argentina	Brazil	Brazil
Aerodance	Argentina	—	—
