= Marcelo Palacio =

Argentine gymnast (born 1975)

- Born: 4 April 1975 (age 51)

Gymnastics career
- Discipline: Men's artistic gymnastics
- Country represented: Argentina

Marcelo Palacio (born 4 April 1975) is an Argentine gymnast. He competed at the 1996 Summer Olympics.
