= 2012 Pan American Aerobic Gymnastics Championships =

International sports competition

The 2012 Pan American Aerobic Gymnastics Championships were held in Acapulco, Mexico, November 21–26, 2012. The competition was organized by the Mexican Gymnastics Federation, and approved by the International Gymnastics Federation.

== Medalists ==
Event	Gold	Silver	Bronze
Junior
Age group 1	Venezuela	Peru	Brazil
Age group 2	Argentina	Brazil	Venezuela
Senior
Individual men	Iván Veloz (MEX)	Juan José Quiroz (MEX)	Leonardo Perez (ARG)
Individual women	Daiana Nanzer (ARG)	Sol Magdaleno (ARG)	Andrea Plaza (VEN)
Mixed pair	Iván Veloz (MEX); Fiona Irish Rojas (MEX)	Daiana Nanzer (ARG); Leonardo Perez (ARG)	Jean Ruiz (VEN); Vanessa Guerra (VEN) Natalia Bravo (CHI); Victor Retamal (CHI)
Trio	Mexico; Iván Veloz; Juan José Quiroz; Osvaldo Solís Martinéz	Argentina; Barbara Rivas; Rocio Veliz; Sol Magdaleno	Mexico; Jimmy Diego Hernandez; Josue Alexander Ramirez; Daniel Antonio Reyes
Group	Argentina	Argentina	Venezuela
Aero-dance	Argentina	Mexico	Colombia
