= 2017 South American Aerobic Gymnastics Championships =

The 2017 South American Aerobic Gymnastics Championships were held in Lima, Peru, August 23–25, 2017. The competition was organized by the Peruvian Gymnastics Federation and approved by the International Gymnastics Federation.

== Medalists ==
Event	Gold	Silver	Bronze
Individual men	Lucas Barbosa (BRA)	Paulo Santos (BRA)	Francisco Sosa (ARG)
Individual women	Daiana Nanzer (ARG)	Thais Fernandez (PER)	Luamar Martin (BRA)
Mixed pair	Brazil	Argentina	Chile
Trio	Brazil	Argentina	Argentina
Team	Brazil	Argentina	Chile
