= 2022 Pan American Aerobic Gymnastics Championships =

International sports competition

The 2022 Pan American Aerobic Gymnastics Championships was held in Cúcuta, Colombia, from October 26 to 29, 2022. The competition was approved by the International Gymnastics Federation.

== Medalists ==
=== Senior ===
Event	Gold	Silver	Bronze
Individual men	Lucas Barbosa (BRA)	Alberto Nava (MEX)	Iván Veloz (MEX)
Individual women	Thais Fernandez (PER)	Catalina Juri (ARG)	Brenda Weber (ARG)
Mixed pairs	Argentina	Mexico	Argentina
Trio	Chile	Argentina	Peru
Group	Argentina	Peru	Mexico
Dance	Argentina	Mexico	Uruguay
Team	Argentina	Mexico	—
