= 2018 South American Trampoline Championships =

The 2018 South American Trampoline Championships were held in Cochabamba, Bolivia, from December 5 to 10, 2018. The competition was organized by the Bolivian Gymnastics Federation, and approved by the International Gymnastics Federation.

== Medalists ==
Event	Gold	Silver	Bronze
Men's individual trampoline	Lucas Adorno (ARG)	Bernardo Aquino (ARG)	Alvaro Calero (COL)
Women's individual trampoline	Lucila Maldonado (ARG)	Mara Colombo (ARG)	Lorrane Souza (BRA)
Women's synchronized trampoline	Lorrane Souza (BRA); Luara Sampaio (BRA)	Lucila Maldonado (ARG); Mara Colombo (ARG)	—
Men's double mini trampoline	Bernardo Aquino (ARG)	Federico Cury (ARG)	—
Women's double mini trampoline	Lucila Maldonado (ARG)	—	—
