= 2015 South American Aerobic Gymnastics Championships =

International aerobic gymnastics competition

The 2015 South American Aerobic Gymnastics Championships were held in Lima, Peru, August 24–30, 2015. The competition was organized by the Peruvian Gymnastics Federation, and approved by the International Gymnastics Federation.

== Participating countries ==
- Argentina
- Brazil
- Chile
- Colombia
- Peru
- Venezuela

== Medalists ==
Event	Gold	Silver	Bronze
Individual men	Lucas Barbosa (BRA)	Alejandro Castejon (VEN)	John Medina (COL)
Individual women	Daiana Nanzer (ARG)	Luamar Martin (BRA)	Sol Magdaleno (ARG)
Mixed pair	Argentina	Chile	Argentina
Trio	Brazil	Argentina	Argentina
Group	Argentina	Brazil	Argentina
Aero-dance	Argentina	—N/a	—N/a
