= 2017 South American Trampoline Championships =

The 2017 South American Trampoline Championships were held in Paipa, Colombia, September 15–17, 2017. The competition was organized by the Colombian Gymnastics Federation, and approved by the International Gymnastics Federation.

== Medalists ==
Event	Gold	Silver	Bronze
Men's individual trampoline	Alvaro Calero (COL)	Federico Cury (ARG)	Lucas Tobias (BRA)
Women's individual trampoline	Daienne Lima (BRA)	Ingrid Maior (BRA)	Alida Rojo (VEN)
Women's trampoline team	Argentina; Mara Colombo; Marianela Galli; Delfina Podesta	Brazil; Daienne Lima; Alice Gomes; Lorrane Sampaio; Ingrid Maior	Venezuela; Grisbel Gutierrez; Carolayn Lopez; Alida Rojo
Men's double mini trampoline	Lucas Adorno (ARG)	Lucas Tobias (BRA)	Juan Carlos Varcarcel (COL)
Women's double mini trampoline	Mara Colombo (ARG)	Marianela Galli (ARG)	—
Men's tumbling	Nelson Ayala (COL)	Jhonny Calle (COL)	—
Women's tumbling	Thais Carneiro (BRA)	—	—
