= Orlando Auciello =

Materials scientist and physicist

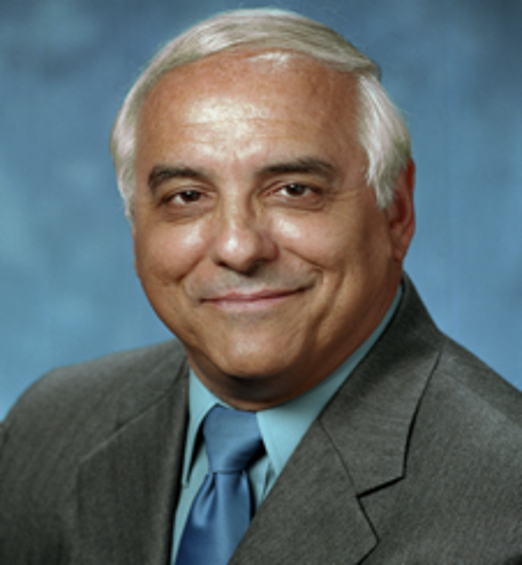
- Auciello in 2025
- Born: Córdoba, Argentina
- Education: National University of Cuyo (PhD, MS); National University of Córdoba (Electronic Engineering)
- Known for: Ultrananocrystalline diamond films
- Awards: American Association for the Advancement of Science Fellow (2008); Materials Research Society Fellow (2009); R&D 100 Award (2003, 2008, 2009, 2011); International Association of Advanced Materials (IAAM) Fellow (2023)
- Scientific career
- Fields: Materials science, Physics
- Workplaces: University of Texas at Dallas; Argonne National Laboratory; North Carolina State University

Orlando Auciello is an Argentine-born materials scientist and physicist. He is a Distinguished Endowed Chair Professor in the Departments of Materials Science and Engineering and Bioengineering at the University of Texas at Dallas (2013–present).

He previously served as a Distinguished Fellow and senior scientist at Argonne National Laboratory (1996-2012), where he co-developed ultrananocrystalline diamond (UNCD) thin-film technology. Auciello co-founded Advanced Diamond Technologies in 2003 to commercialize UNCD-based products, including mechanical pump seals, bearings, and AFM tips with significantly enhanced performance; the company's industrial division was acquired by John Crane in 2019.

He also co-founded Original Biomedical Implants (OBI-USA, 2013–present; OBI-México, 2016-present), focused on developing and commercializing next-generation medical implants and prostheses coated with biocompatible UNCD for applications such as dental implants, orthopedic devices, and biosensors.

== Early life and education ==
Auciello was born in Córdoba, Argentina. He completed a program in electronic engineering at the National University of Córdoba from 1964 to 1970. He received his MS in physics in 1973 and PhD in physics in 1976 from the Physics Institute "Dr. Balseiro" at the Universidad Nacional de Cuyo-Argentina.

== Career ==
Auciello conducted research as postdoc at McMaster University (1977-1979) and Senior Scientists the University of Toronto (1979-1984). He was an associate professor at North Carolina State University (1985-1988) and a senior scientist at the Microelectronics Center of North Carolina (1988-1996). At Argonne National Laboratory (1996-2012), becoming a Distinguished Fellow in 2010.

In 2012, Auciello became a Distinguished Endowed Chair Professor at the University of Texas at Dallas. He has held adjunct professorships at the University of Colorado Colorado Springs and Michigan State University. Auciello retired from UTD in December 31, 2025

Auciello was president of the Materials Research Society in 2013.

== Research ==
Auciello R&D focuses on multifunctional oxide thin films for ferroelectric random-access memory (FeRAM), high-dielectric constant films for super-capacitors, and piezoelectric films for new generation of sensors. He co-developed UNCD films for applications in MEMS / NEMS, electron emitters, and biomedical devices.

UNCD coating technology contributed to the coating of the Argus II retinal prosthesis, which returned partial vision to people blind by retinas pigmentosa.

As of 2026, Auciello has an h-index of 79 and over 28,000 citations. He holds 20 patents.

=== Oxide thin films ===
Auciello has worked on oxide thin films for applications in ferroelectric random-access memories (FeRAMs], high-dielectric constant devices, and supercapacitors.

=== Ultrananocrystalline diamond ===
Auciello co-invented (with Gruen and Krauss) the UNCD film technology with grain sizes of 2-5 nm. Applications include RF MEMS/NEMS, field emission cathodes, and coatings for mechanical seals, bearings, AFM tips and biomedical implants.

== Entrepreneurship ==
Auciello co-founded (with J.A. Carlisle and N. Kane) Advanced Diamond Technologies (ADT) in 2003 to commercialize the UNCD coating technology. The company was acquired by John Crane Inc. in 2019., which continues to commercialize the UNCD-coated industrial products.

Auciello founded Original Biomedical Implants, LLC (OBI-USA) in 2013, and co-founded (with Dr. J.L. Rubio-MD) OBI-México in 2016, to develop and market UNCD-coated medical devices and prostheses.

== Awards and honors ==
- Fellow, American Association for the Advancement of Science (2009)
- Fellow, Materials Research Society (2009)
- Seven R&D 100 Awards (including 2003 for large area ultrananocrystalline diamond technology, 2008 for commercialization of ultrananocrystalline diamond-coated mechanical pump seals, 2009 for artificial retina, 2011)
- Fellow, International Association of Advanced Materials (IAAM) (2023)

== Selected publications ==
- Auciello, Orlando; Scott, James F.; Ramesh, Ramamoorthy (July 1998). "The Physics of Ferroelectric Memories". Physics Today. 51 (7). American Institute of Physics: 22–27. doi:10.1063/1.882324.
- Fong, D.D.; Stephenson, G.B.; Streiffer, S.K.; Eastman, J.A.; Auciello, O.; Fuoss, P.H.; Thompson, C. (2004). "Ferroelectricity in ultrathin perovskite films". Science. 304 (5677): 1650–1653. doi:10.1126/science.1098252. PMID 15192223.
- Yang, W.; Auciello, O.; Butler, J.E.; Cai, W.; Carlisle, J.A.; Gerbi, J.E.; Gruen, D.M.; Knickerbocker, T.; Lasseter, T.L.; Russell, J.N.; Smith, S.R.; Hamers, R.J. (2002). "DNA-modified nanocrystalline diamond thin-films as stable, biologically active substrates". Nature Materials. 1 (4): 253–257. doi:10.1038/nmat779. PMID 12618788.
- Nagarajan, V.; Roytburd, A.; Stanishevsky, A.; Prasertchoung, S.; Zhao, T.; Chen, L.; Melngailis, J.; Auciello, O.; Ramesh, R. (2003). "Dynamics of ferroelastic domains in ferroelectric thin films". Nature Materials. 2 (1): 43–47. doi:10.1038/nmat800. PMID 12652672.
