= 2018 Pan American Aerobic Gymnastics Championships =

International sports competition

The 2018 Pan American Aerobic Gymnastics Championships were held in Lima, Peru, from November 29 to December 1, 2018. The competition was organized by the Peruvian Gymnastics Federation, and approved by the International Gymnastics Federation.

== Medalists ==
=== Senior ===
Event	Gold	Silver	Bronze
Individual men	Iván Veloz (MEX)	Lucas Barbosa (BRA)	Alejandro Castejón (VEN)
Individual women	Tamires Santos (BRA)	Thais Fernandez (PER)	Daniela Pinto (ARG)
Mixed pairs	Brazil	Argentina	Chile
Trio	Argentina	Chile	Mexico
Group	Argentina	Argentina	Mexico
Dance	Argentina	Mexico	—
Team	Argentina	Mexico	Brazil
