= 2025 South American Trampoline Championships =

The 2025 South American Trampoline Championships was held in Cochabamba, Bolivia, from September 25 to 28, 2025. The competition was organized by the Bolivian Gymnastics Federation.

== Medalists ==
Event	Gold	Silver	Bronze
Men
Men's individual trampoline	Tobias Weise (ARG)	Wallace Celestino (BRA)	Zackdhyel Montoya (VEN)
Men's synchronized trampoline	Tobias Weise (ARG); Agustín Messuti (ARG)	Guilherme Pinto (BRA); Marcos Pedro (BRA)	Miguel Valencia (PER); Joel Yzquierdo (PER)
Men's double mini	Guilherme Pinto (BRA)	Joel Yzquierdo (PER)	Joseph Solórzano (ECU)
Men's tumbling	Joseph Solórzano (ECU)	Diego Vilcas (PER)	Jheremy Chimarro (ECU)
Women
Women's individual trampoline	Júlia Rocha (BRA)	Martina Quintana (ARG)	Maria Marcante (BRA)
Women's synchronized trampoline	Júlia Rocha (BRA); Maria Marcante (BRA)	Alida Rojo (VEN); Alberti Parvati (VEN)	Agustina Escudero (ARG); Julieta Sivori (ARG)
Women's double mini	Giulia Belcorso (BRA)	Maya Quinteros (BOL)	Julieta Sivori (ARG)
Women's tumbling	Giriham Correa (PER)	Agustina Escudero (ARG)	—
Mixed
Mixed synchronized trampoline	Miguel Valencia (PER); Angela Pacheco (PER)	Zackdhyel Montoya (VEN); Alida Rojo (VEN)	—
