= 2017 Pan American Acrobatic Gymnastics Championships =

International sports competition

The 2nd Pan American Acrobatic Gymnastics Championships were held in Daytona Beach, United States, from October 13 to 15, 2017. The competition was organized by USA Gymnastics, and approved by the International Gymnastics Federation.

== Participating nations ==
- Brazil
- Canada
- Mexico
- Puerto Rico
- United States

== Results ==
=== Senior ===
Event	Gold	Silver	Bronze
Women's pair	United States	Brazil	—N/a
Mixed pair	United States	—N/a	—N/a
Women's group	Brazil	—N/a	—N/a

==== Junior and age groups ====
Event	Gold	Silver	Bronze
Junior women's pair	United States	—N/a	—N/a
Junior men's pair	United States	—N/a	—N/a
Junior women's group	Canada	—N/a	—N/a
Women's pair 12–18	United States	Canada	United States
Mixed pair 12–18	United States	United States	Brazil
Women's group 12–18	United States	United States	Canada
Men's group 12–18	United States	—N/a	—N/a
Women's pair 11–16	United States	United States	Canada
Men's pair 11–16	Canada	—N/a	—N/a
Mixed pair 11–16	Canada	Brazil	—N/a
Women's group 11–16	United States	United States	Canada

== Medal table ==
Rank	Nation	Gold	Silver	Bronze	Total
1	United States	10	4	1	15
2	Canada	3	1	3	7
3	Brazil	1	2	1	4
Totals (3 entries)		14	7	5	26
