= 2001 Pan American Aerobic Gymnastics Championships =

International sports competition

The 2001 Pan American Aerobic Gymnastics Championships were held in Santiago, Chile. The competition was organized by the Chilean Gymnastics Federation.

== Medalists ==
Event	Gold	Silver	Bronze
Mixed pair	Unknown	Argentina	Unknown
