= 2025 Pan American Aerobic Gymnastics Championships =

International sports competition

The 2025 Pan American Aerobic Gymnastics Championships was held in Montevideo, Uruguay, from October 6 to 13, 2025. The competition was organized by the Uruguayan Gymnastics Federation.

== Medalists ==
=== Senior ===
Event	Gold	Silver	Bronze
Individual men	Iván Veloz (MEX)	Kevin Riveros (ARG)	Mario Nava (MEX)
Individual women	Guadalupe Aberastain (ARG)	María Fernanda González (MEX)	Thais Fernandez (PER)
Mixed pairs	Uruguay	Argentina	Chile
Trio	Mexico	Argentina	Peru
Group	Peru	Mexico	Argentina
Dance	Mexico	Argentina	Mexico
