= 2022 South American Trampoline Championships =

The 2022 South American Trampoline Championships were held in Bucaramanga, Colombia, from September 5 to 12, 2022. The competition was organized by the Colombian Gymnastics Federation and approved by the International Gymnastics Federation.

== Medalists ==
Event	Gold	Silver	Bronze
Men's individual trampoline	Santiago Ferrari (ARG)	Manuel Sierra (COL)	Vinícius Celestino (BRA)
Women's individual trampoline	Luara Rezende (BRA)	Florencia Braun (ARG)	Julia Rocha (BRA)
Men's synchronized trampoline	Federico Cury (ARG); Santiago Escallier (ARG)	Diego Giraldo (COL); Manuel Sierra (COL)	Vinícius Celestino (BRA); Lucas Tobias (BRA)
Women's synchronized trampoline	Sofia Cardenas (COL); Cely Alisson (COL)	Florencia Braun (ARG); Florencia Jara (ARG)	Nathalia Rodrigues (BRA); Luara Rezende (BRA)
Men's trampoline team	Argentina; Federico Cury; Santiago Ferrari; Tobias Weise	Brazil; Vinícius Celestino; Cauã Rodrigues; Lucas Tobias	Colombia; Diego Giraldo; Santiago Parra; Manuel Sierra
Women's trampoline team	Argentina; Florencia Braun; Florencia Jara; Candela Sacca	Colombia; Cely Alisson; Sofia Cardenas; Sara Garcia	Brazil; Luara Rezende; Julia Rocha; Nathalia Rodrigues
Men's double mini	Santiago Escallier (ARG)	Federico Cury (ARG)	Nelson Ayala (COL)
Women's double mini	Julia Cano (ARG)	Florencia Braun (ARG)	—
Men's tumbling	Nelson Ayala (COL)	Gustavo Diaz (COL)	Erick Ledesma (ECU)
