= 2025 Pan American Acrobatic Gymnastics Championships =

Gymnastics event in Carolina, Puerto Rico

- Location: Carolina, Puerto Rico
- Date: November 12–16, 2025

The 2025 Pan American Acrobatic Gymnastics Championships was held in Carolina, Puerto Rico, from November 12 to 16, 2025.

== Results ==
=== Senior ===
| Event | Gold | Silver | Bronze |
|---|---|---|---|
| Women's Pair All-Around | United States; Sydney Padios; Willow Noble | Canada; Juliana Summers; Lauren Marttila | Not awarded |
| Women's Pair Balance | United States; Sydney Padios; Willow Noble | Canada; Juliana Summers; Lauren Marttila | Not awarded |
| Women's Pair Dynamic | United States; Sydney Padios; Willow Noble | Canada; Juliana Summers; Lauren Marttila | Not awarded |
| Women's Pair Combined | United States; Sydney Padios; Willow Noble | Canada; Juliana Summers; Lauren Marttila | Not awarded |
| Men's Pair All-Around | United States; Vsevolod Ossolodkov; Yaroslav Ossolodkov | Not awarded | |
| Men's Pair Balance | United States; Vsevolod Ossolodkov; Yaroslav Ossolodkov | Not awarded | |
| Men's Pair Dynamic | United States; Vsevolod Ossolodkov; Yaroslav Ossolodkov | Not awarded | |
| Men's Pair Combined | United States; Vsevolod Ossolodkov; Yaroslav Ossolodkov | Not awarded | |
| Women's Group All-Around | Canada; Katherine Thompson; Maegan Kasian; Jerusha Weekes | Not awarded | |
| Women's Group Balance | Canada; Katherine Thompson; Maegan Kasian; Jerusha Weekes | Not awarded | |
| Women's Group Dynamic | Canada; Katherine Thompson; Maegan Kasian; Jerusha Weekes | Not awarded | |
| Women's Group Combined | Canada n Maegan Kasian; Jerusha Weekes | Not awarded | |

=== Junior ===
| Event | Gold | Silver | Bronze |
|---|---|---|---|
| Team | United States | Canada | Not awarded |
| Women's Pair All-Around | United States; Sophia Robertson; Isabella Brookins | Not awarded | |
| Women's Pair Balance | United States; Sophia Robertson; Isabella Brookins | Not awarded | |
| Women's Pair Dynamic | United States; Sophia Robertson; Isabella Brookins | Not awarded | |
| Women's Pair Combined | United States; Sophia Robertson; Isabella Brookins | Not awarded | |
| Women's Group All-Around | United States; Juli Williams; Carmelle Djoumgoue; Aubrie Cunningham | United States; Roni Azerrad; Layla DeVaul; Ayden Rawls-Blodgett | Canada; Victoria Giroux; Corélia Gaudreault-Cloutier; Rosie Laflamme |
| Women's Group Balance | United States; Juli Williams; Carmelle Djoumgoue; Aubrie Cunningham | United States; Roni Azerrad; Layla DeVaul; Ayden Rawls-Blodgett | Canada; Victoria Giroux; Corélia Gaudreault-Cloutier; Rosie Laflamme |
| Women's Group Dynamic | United States; Juli Williams; Carmelle Djoumgoue; Aubrie Cunningham | United States; Roni Azerrad; Layla DeVaul; Ayden Rawls-Blodgett | Canada; Victoria Giroux; Corélia Gaudreault-Cloutier; Rosie Laflamme |
| Women's Group Combined | United States; Juli Williams; Carmelle Djoumgoue; Aubrie Cunningham | United States; Roni Azerrad; Layla DeVaul; Ayden Rawls-Blodgett | Canada; Victoria Giroux; Corélia Gaudreault-Cloutier; Rosie Laflamme |

=== Age Group ===
| Event | Gold | Silver | Bronze |
|---|---|---|---|
| Team | United States | Canada | Brazil |
| Women's Pair All-Around | Canada; Nantia Chotza; Suah Choi | United States; Kelly Gillum; Cecilia Hiemcke | United States; Alora McCastle; Maci Mills |
| Women's Pair Balance | Canada; Nantia Chotza; Suah Choi | United States; Alora McCastle; Maci Mills | United States; Kelly Gillum; Cecilia Hiemcke |
| Women's Pair Dynamic | Canada; Nantia Chotza; Suah Choi | United States; Kelly Gillum; Cecilia Hiemcke | United States; Alora McCastle; Maci Mills |
| Mixed Pair All-Around | United States; Arianna Khuu; Nicholas Elbaz | Not awarded | |
| Mixed Pair Balance | United States; Arianna Khuu; Nicholas Elbaz | Not awarded | |
| Mixed Pair Dynamic | United States; Arianna Khuu; Nicholas Elbaz | Not awarded | |
| Women's Group All-Around | Canada; Natalie Rup; Ella Fedoration; Judy Ghafari | United States; Alexia Irreno; Zoe DeShields; Miah Collazo | United States; Ella Azerrad; Kyra Veiga; Berlin Morgan |
| Women's Group Balance | Canada; Natalie Rup; Ella Fedoration; Judy Ghafari | United States; Alexia Irreno; Zoe DeShields; Miah Collazo | United States; Ella Azerrad; Kyra Veiga; Berlin Morgan |
| Women's Group Dynamic | Canada; Natalie Rup; Ella Fedoration; Judy Ghafari | United States; Ella Azerrad; Kyra Veiga; Berlin Morgan | United States; Alexia Irreno; Zoe DeShields; Miah Collazo |
| Men's Group All-Around | United States; Dean Miller; Caleb Hoffmann; Noah Alvarado; Joshua Hoffmann | Not awarded | |
| Men's Group Balance | United States; Dean Miller; Caleb Hoffmann; Noah Alvarado; Joshua Hoffmann | Not awarded | |
| Men's Group Dynamic | United States; Dean Miller; Caleb Hoffmann; Noah Alvarado; Joshua Hoffmann | Not awarded | |

== Medal table ==
* Host nation (Puerto Rico)

| Rank | Nation | Gold | Silver | Bronze | Total |
|---|---|---|---|---|---|
| 1 | United States | 24 | 10 | 6 | 40 |
| 2 | Canada | 10 | 6 | 4 | 20 |
| 3 | Brazil | 0 | 0 | 1 | 1 |
| Totals (3 entries) | | 34 | 16 | 11 | 61 |
