= 2023 Pan American Aerobic Gymnastics Championships =

International sports competition

The 2023 Pan American Aerobic Gymnastics Championships was held in Lima, Peru, from November 7 to 11, 2023. The competition was approved by the International Gymnastics Federation.

== Medalists ==
=== Senior ===
| Event | Gold | Silver | Bronze |
|---|---|---|---|
| Individual men | Lucas Barbosa (BRA) | Iván Veloz (MEX) | Alberto Nava (MEX) |
| Individual women | Tamires Silva (BRA) | Thais Fernandez (PER) | Bianca Henriquez (CHI) |
| Mixed pairs | Brazil | Argentina | Argentina |
| Trio | Argentina | Peru | Argentina |
| Group | Argentina | Peru | Argentina |
| Dance | Argentina | Mexico | Uruguay |
