= 2016 South American Aerobic Gymnastics Championships =

The 2016 South American Aerobic Gymnastics Championships were held in Bogotá, Colombia, August 24–29, 2016. The competition was organized by the Colombian Gymnastics Federation, and approved by the International Gymnastics Federation.

== Participating countries ==
- Argentina
- Brazil
- Chile
- Colombia
- Paraguay
- Peru
- Venezuela

== Medalists ==
| Event | Gold | Silver | Bronze |
|---|---|---|---|
| Individual men | Lucas Barbosa (BRA) | Alejandro Castejon (VEN) | Etiel Retamal (CHI) |
| Individual women | Daiana Nanzer (ARG) | Caroline dos Santos (BRA) | Thais Fernandez (PER) |
| Mixed pair | Brazil | Chile | Argentina |
| Trio | Brazil | Argentina; Chile | — |
| Group | Argentina | Chile | — |
| Aero-dance | Colombia | — | — |
