= 2016 Pan American Aerobic Gymnastics Championships =

International sports competition

The 2016 Pan American Aerobic Gymnastics Championships were held in Lima, Peru, November 24–27, 2016. The competition was organized by the Peruvian Gymnastics Federation, and approved by the International Gymnastics Federation.

== Participating countries ==
- Argentina
- Brazil
- Chile
- Colombia
- Peru
- Uruguay
- Venezuela

== Medalists ==
Event	Gold	Silver	Bronze
Individual men	Lucas Barbosa (BRA)	Leonardo Pérez (ARG)	Paulo Santos (BRA)
Individual women	Daiana Nanzer (ARG)	Thais Fernandez (PER)	Tamires Silva (BRA)
Mixed pairs	Brazil; Lucas Barbosa; Tamires Silva	Brazil; Luamar Martin; Paulo Santos	Argentina; Bryan Saavedra; Valentina Medina Argentina; Leonardo Pérez; Lucila Medina
Trio	Argentina; Rocio Veliz; Florencia Cagnola; Catalina Juri	Brazil; Caroline Santiago; Lucas Barbosa; Tamires Silva	Argentina; Lucila Medina; Valentina Medina; Brenda Weber
Group	Argentina; Rocio Veliz; Florencia Cagnola; Catalina Juri; Micaela Villa; Sol Magdaleno	Brazil; Christian Andrade; Edson Nunes; José Henrique Oliveira; Maelton Siqueira; Marcelo Martins	Argentina; Lucila Medina; Valentina Medina; Brenda Weber; Camila Bravo; Yanina Muratore
Aerodance	Brazil; Christian Andrade; Edson Nunes; José Henrique Oliveira; Maelton Siqueira; Marcelo Martins; Adrielle Lopes; Cibele Oliani; Marina Lopez	—N/a	—N/a
