= 2021 South American Aerobic Gymnastics Championships =

The 2021 South American Aerobic Gymnastics Championships were held in Ibagué, Colombia, from November 9 to 14, 2021. The competition was organized by the Colombian Gymnastics Federation and approved by the International Gymnastics Federation.

== Medalists ==
Event	Gold	Silver	Bronze
Individual men	Elian Florez (COL)	Mário Santos (BRA)	Marcelo Arouche (BRA)
Individual women	Thais Fernandez (PER)	Maricielo de Jesus (PER)	Daniela Acosta (COL)
Mixed pair	Chile	Colombia	—
Trio	Chile	Peru	—
Team	Brazil	Peru	Chile
