= Sid Jensen =

Canadian gymnast (1947–2025)

- Full name: Sidney Allen Jensen
- Born: 11 August 1947 Halifax, Nova Scotia, Canada
- Died: 18 November 2025 (aged 78)

Gymnastics career
- Discipline: Men's artistic gymnastics
- Country represented: Canada
- College team: Michigan Wolverines (1968–1970)

Sidney Allen Jensen (11 August 1947 – 18 November 2025) was a Canadian gymnast. He competed in eight events at the 1968 Summer Olympics. Jensen died on 18 November 2025, at the age of 78.
