= 2024 Pan American Aerobic Gymnastics Championships =

International sports competition

The 2024 Pan American Aerobic Gymnastics Championships was held in Panama City, Panama, from November 13 to 16, 2024. The competition was approved by the International Gymnastics Federation.

== Medalists ==
=== Senior ===
Event	Gold	Silver	Bronze
Individual men	Iván Veloz (MEX)	Alberto Nava (MEX)	Diego Grachot (URU)
Individual women	Thais Fernandez (PER)	Bianca Henriquez (CHI)	Guadalupe Aberastain (ARG)
Mixed pairs	Mexico	Argentina	Uruguay
Trio	Peru	Peru	Argentina
Group	Argentina	Peru	Peru
Dance	Argentina	Uruguay	Argentina
