= 2019 Pan American Aerobic Gymnastics Championships =

International sports competition

The 2019 Pan American Aerobic Gymnastics Championships were held in Buenos Aires, Argentina, from October 10 to 13, 2019. The competition was approved by the International Gymnastics Federation.

== Medalists ==
=== Senior ===
Event	Gold	Silver	Bronze
Individual men	Iván Veloz (MEX)	Jorge Guerrero (MEX)	Alejandro Castejón (VEN)
Individual women	Thais Fernandez (PER)	Daniela Pinto (ARG)	Daiana Nanzer (ARG)
Mixed pairs	Argentina	Chile	Mexico
Trio	Argentina	Chile	Peru
Group	Argentina	Peru	Argentina
Dance	Argentina	Mexico	Peru
