= 2007 Pan American Aerobic Gymnastics Championships =

International sports competition

The 2007 Pan American Aerobic Gymnastics Championships were held in Morelos, Mexico. The competition was organized by the Mexican Gymnastics Federation.

== Medalists ==
Event	Gold	Silver	Bronze
Individual women	Marcela Lopez (BRA)	Daiana Nanzer (ARG)	Lorena Lopez (VEN)
