= 1988 South American Rhythmic Gymnastics Championships =

South American Championship

The 1988 South American Rhythmic Gymnastics Championships were held in Rosario, Argentina, October 1988.

== Medalists ==
| Event | Gold | Silver | Bronze |
|---|---|---|---|
| Team all-around | Brazil; Rosana Favila; Jacqueline Pedreira; Françoise Biot | Argentina | Unknown |
| Individual all-around | Françoise Biot (BRA) | Rosana Favila (BRA) | Jacqueline Pedreira (BRA) |
