= 2005 Pan American Aerobic Gymnastics Championships =

International sports competition

The 2005 Pan American Aerobic Gymnastics Championships were held in Mexico City, Mexico. The competition was organized by the Mexican Gymnastics Federation.

== Medalists ==
Event	Gold	Silver	Bronze
Mixed pair	Unknown	Argentina	Unknown
Trio	Unknown	Argentina	Unknown
