= 2016 South American Trampoline Championships =

The 2016 South American Trampoline Championships were held in Bogotá, Colombia, November 26–29, 2016. The competition was organized by the Colombian Gymnastics Federation, and approved by the International Gymnastics Federation.

== Medalists ==
Event	Gold	Silver	Bronze
Men's synchronized trampoline	Ángel Hernández (COL); Alvaro Calero (COL)	Lucas Adorno (ARG); Federico Cury (ARG)	Edwin Quintero (COL); Sebastian Jimenez (COL)
Women's synchronized trampoline	Mara Colombo (ARG); Marianela Galli (ARG)	Katish Hernandéz (COL); Angie Peña (COL)	Alida Rojo (VEN); Grisvel Gutierrez (VEN)
Men's individual trampoline	Lucas Adorno (ARG)	Ángel Hernández (COL)	Bernardo Aquino (ARG)
Women's individual trampoline	Daienne Lima (BRA)	Katish Hernandez (COL)	Ingrid Maior (BRA)
Men's double mini trampoline	Lucas Adorno (ARG)	Juan Carlos Varcacel (COL)	Johnny Calle (COL)
Women's double mini trampoline	Mara Colombo (ARG)	Julieta Espeche (ARG)	Marianela Galli (ARG)
Men's tumbling	Lucas Nascimento (BRA)	Bernardo Aquino (ARG)	Walter Ruiz (ARG)
Women's tumbling	Thais Carneiro (BRA)	—	—
