= 2018 South American Aerobic Gymnastics Championships =

The 2018 South American Aerobic Gymnastics Championships were held in Lima, Peru, from July 10 to 15, 2018. The competition was organized by the Peruvian Gymnastics Federation and approved by the International Gymnastics Federation.

== Medalists ==
| Event | Gold | Silver | Bronze |
|---|---|---|---|
| Individual men | Lucas Barbosa (BRA) | Kevin Riveros (ARG) | Alejandro Castejon (VEN) |
| Individual women | Thais Fernandez (PER) | Tamires Silva (BRA) | Alessandra Petrozzi (PER) |
| Mixed pair | Brazil; Lucas Barbosa; Tamires Silva | Chile; Vanessa Guerra; Victor Retamal | Colombia; Lina Guzman; Christian Camacho |
| Trio | Chile; Vanessa Guerra; Etiel Retamal; Victor Retamal | — | — |
| Group | Peru; Thais Fernandez; Alessandra Petrozzi; Alessandra Sempertegui; Manuela Montero; Alessia Rodriguez | — | — |
