= 2023 Pan American Acrobatic Gymnastics Championships =

Gymnastics event in Ibagué, Colombia

- Location: Ibagué, Colombia
- Date: December 8–10, 2023

The 2023 Pan American Acrobatic Gymnastics Championships was held in Ibagué, Colombia from December 8 to 10, 2023.

== Participating nations ==
- Brazil
- Canada
- Colombia
- Mexico
- Puerto Rico
- United States

== Results ==
=== Senior ===
Event	Gold	Silver	Bronze
Women's Pair Balance	United States; Ariana Katsov; Mo Arthur	Not awarded	
Women's Pair Dynamic	United States; Ariana Katsov; Mo Arthur	Not awarded	
Women's Pair All-Around	United States; Ariana Katsov; Mo Arthur	Not awarded	
Women's Trio Balance	United States; Mariam Tutberidze; Kayla Vonder Haar; Grace Vonder Haar	Not awarded	
Women's Trio Dynamic	United States; Mariam Tutberidze; Kayla Vonder Haar; Grace Vonder Haar	Not awarded	
Women's Trio All-Around	United States; Mariam Tutberidze; Kayla Vonder Haar; Grace Vonder Haar	Not awarded	

=== Junior and age groups ===
Event	Gold	Silver	Bronze
AG1(11-16) Team	United States; Faith Nicol; Peter Vonder Haar; Leana Borodayev; Isabella Brookins; Alani Do; Jordana Beyer; Silver Weddle	Not awarded	
AG1(11-16) Men's Pair Balance	Colombia; David Diaz; Ilian Lozano	Not awarded	
AG1(11–16) Men's Pair Dynamic	Colombia; David Diaz; Ilian Lozano	Not awarded	
AG1(11–16) Women's Pair Balance	United States; Leana Borodayev; Isabella Brookins	Puerto Rico; Annaira Rodriguez; Alianis Ocasio Mexico; Abigail Dominguez; María José Lara	Not awarded
AG1(11-16) Women's Pair Dynamic	United States; Leana Borodayev; Isabella Brookins	Mexico; Sofía Rodriguez; Nora Guzmán	Mexico; Abigail Dominguez; María José Lara
AG1(11-16) Women's Trio Balance	Canada; Mackenzie Yelic; Kenna Erickson; Alejandra Sochacki	United States; Alani Do; Jordana Beyer; Silver Weddle	Brazil; Beatriz Sabia Barretto; Fernanda Borges Duarte; Manuela Veras Batista
AG1(11-16) Women's Trio Dynamic	United States; Alani Do; Jordana Beyer; Silver Weddle	Brazil; Beatriz Sabia Barretto; Fernanda Borges Duarte; Manuela Veras Batista	Canada; Mackenzie Yelic; Kenna Erickson; Alejandra Sochacki
AG1(11-16) Mixed Pair Balance	United States; Faith Nicol; Peter Vonder Haar	Not awarded	
AG1(11–16) Mixed Pair Dynamic	United States; Faith Nicol; Peter Vonder Haar	Not awarded	
Junior (12-18 / 13-19) Team	United States; Maddy Hunt; Avery Puleo; Anna Sullivan; Maya Lissenknova; Bernice Moshos; Sydney Padios; Willow Noble	Not awarded	
AG2(12-18) Women's Pair Balance	United States; Maya Lissenknova; Bernice Moshos	Puerto Rico; Karla Joy; Zohali Soto	Not awarded
AG2(12-18) Women's Pair Dynamic	United States; Maya Lissenknova; Bernice Moshos	Puerto Rico; Karla Joy; Zohali Soto	Not awarded
AG2(12-18) Women's Pair All-Around	United States; Maya Lissenknova; Bernice Moshos	Puerto Rico; Karla Joy; Zohali Soto	Not awarded
AG2(12-18) Women's Trio Balance	United States; Avery Puleo; Anna Sullivan; Maddy Hunt	Canada; Lauren Marttila; Jorden Diana; Karyzza Guillermo	Canada; Amanda Chen; Kaitlyn Tofflemire; Sara Meneses
AG2(12-18) Women's Trio Dynamic	United States; Avery Puleo; Anna Sullivan; Maddy Hunt	Canada; Lauren Marttila; Jorden Diana; Karyzza Guillermo	Brazil; Anali Oliveira; Isabela Azevedo; Mayanna Mariana Mango
AG2(12-18) Women's Trio All-Around	United States; Avery Puleo; Anna Sullivan; Maddy Hunt	Canada; Lauren Marttila; Jorden Diana; Karyzza Guillermo	Brazil; Anali Oliveira; Isabela Azevedo; Mayanna Mariana Mango
AG2(12-18) Mixed Pair Balance	United States; Rylee Cummins; George Yeramishyn	United States; Layla Lugo; Tyler Berg	Not awarded
AG2(12-18) Mixed Pair Dynamic	United States; Rylee Cummins; George Yeramishyn	United States; Layla Lugo; Tyler Berg	Not awarded
AG2(12-18) Mixed Pair All-Around	United States; Rylee Cummins; George Yeramishyn	United States; Layla Lugo; Tyler Berg	Not awarded
AG3(13-19) Men's Pair Balance	United States; Ethan Chang; David Vonder Haar	Not awarded	
AG3(13-19) Men's Pair Dynamic	United States; Ethan Chang; David Vonder Haar	Not awarded	
AG3(13-19) Men's Pair All-Around	United States; Ethan Chang; David Vonder Haar	Not awarded	
AG3(13-19) Women's Pair Balance	United States; Sydney Padios; Willow Noble	Canada; Chloe Fiore; Maeve Doherty	Canada; Lily Ronneberg; Fiona Jones
AG3(13-19) Women's Pair Dynamic	United States; Sydney Padios; Willow Noble	Canada; Chloe Fiore; Maeve Doherty	Canada; Lily Ronneberg; Fiona Jones
AG3(13-19) Women's Pair All-Around	United States; Sydney Padios; Willow Noble	Canada; Chloe Fiore; Maeve Doherty	Canada; Lily Ronneberg; Fiona Jones
AG3(13-19) Women's Trio Balance	Canada; Ella Fedoration; Aleksandra Pioun; Juliana Summers	Not awarded	
AG3(13-19) Women's Trio Dynamic	Canada; Ella Fedoration; Aleksandra Pioun; Juliana Summers	Not awarded	
AG3(13-19) Women's Trio All-Around	Canada; Ella Fedoration; Aleksandra Pioun; Juliana Summers	Not awarded	

== Medal table ==
Rank	Nation	Gold	Silver	Bronze	Total
1	United States	28	4	0	32
2	Canada	4	6	5	15
3	Colombia	2	0	0	2
4	Puerto Rico	0	4	0	4
5	Mexico	0	2	1	3
6	Brazil	0	1	3	4
Totals (6 entries)		34	17	9	60
