= 2004 Pan American Trampoline and Tumbling Championships =

International sports competition

The 2004 Pan American Trampoline and Tumbling Championships were held in Tampa, United States, July 20–21, 2004. The event was the inaugural edition of the Pan American Trampoline and Tumbling Championships.

== Medalists ==
Event	Gold	Silver	Bronze
Men
Individual trampoline	Bryan Milonja (CAN)	Jason Burnett (CAN)	Chris Estrada (USA)
Synchronized trampoline	Jason Burnett (CAN); Charles Thibault (CAN)	Derrick Aldrich (USA); Peter Dodd (USA)	Keith Douglas (USA); Josh Vance (USA)
Double mini	David Ford (USA)	Derek Stangel (USA)	Mike Bryde (CAN)
Tumbling	Casey Finley (USA)	Daniel Walker (USA)	Sidney Gordon (USA)
Women
Individual trampoline	Sarah Charles (CAN)	Brittany Dircks (USA)	Marisol Pelletier (CAN)
Synchronized trampoline	Amanda Bailey (USA); Nicole Roethle (USA)	None awarded	None awarded
Double mini	Sarah Charles (CAN)	Julie Warnock (CAN)	Shelley Klochan (USA)
Tumbling	Amy McDonald (USA)	Lindsey Blundell (USA)	Leanne Seitzinger (USA)

Junior Medalists
Event	Gold	Silver	Bronze
Individual trampoline Junior Elite Male	Roberto Carlos Reyes (MEX)	Kyle Soehn (CAN)	Phillip Barbaro (CAN)
Individual trampoline Junior Elite Female	Rosie Maclennan (CAN)	Jenny Wescott (USA)	Alaina Hebert (USA)
Synchronized trampoline Junior Elite Male	Barbaro Philip (CAN) Kyle Soehn (CAN)	Ben Dehan (USA) Jason Thomas (USA)	Kevin Heger (USA) Andrew Muzzarelli (USA)
Synchronized trampoline Junior Elite Female	Rosie Maclennan (CAN) Samantha Sendel (CAN)	Starr Smith (USA) Ashley Terry (USA)	Ashley Grimes (USA) Nani Vercruyssen (USA)

== Medal table ==
Rank	Nation	Gold	Silver	Bronze	Total
1	Canada (CAN)	7	3	3	13
2	United States (USA)	4	8	8	20
3	Mexico (MEX)	1	0	0	1
Totals (3 entries)		12	11	11	34
