= 2019 South American Aerobic Gymnastics Championships =

The 2019 South American Aerobic Gymnastics Championships were held in Melgar, Colombia, from August 27 to September 1, 2019. The competition was organized by the Colombian Gymnastics Federation and approved by the International Gymnastics Federation.

== Medalists ==
Event	Gold	Silver	Bronze
Individual men	Lucas Barbosa (BRA)	William Florez (COL)	Kevin Riveros (ARG)
Individual women	Tamires Silva (BRA)	Lucila Medina (ARG)	Luana Barreira (BRA)
Mixed pair	Brazil	Chile	Argentina
Trio	Argentina	Chile	Peru
Group	Argentina	Peru	—
