= 2015 Pan American Acrobatic Gymnastics Championships =

International sports competition

The 1st Pan American Acrobatic Gymnastics Championships were held in Caguas, Puerto Rico from October 6 to 12, 2015. The competition was organized by the Puerto Rican Gymnastics Federation and approved by the International Gymnastics Federation.

== Participating nations ==
- Brazil
- Canada
- Mexico
- Puerto Rico
- United States

== Results ==
=== Senior ===
Event	Gold	Silver	Bronze
Women's Pair	United States	—	—
Men's Pair	Puerto Rico	—	—
Mixed Pair	United States	—	—
Women's Group	United States	Brazil	—

=== Age Groups ===
Event	Gold	Silver	Bronze
Women's Pair 11–16	United States	Canada	United States
Mixed Pair 11–16	United States	—	—
Women's Group 11–16	United States	Brazil	Puerto Rico
Men's Group 11–16	United States	—	—
Women's Pair 12–18	United States	United States	—
Mixed Pair 12–18	Brazil	—	—
Women's Group 12–18	United States	United States	Brazil
Women's Pair 13–19	Brazil	—	—
Mixed's Pair 13–19	United States	—	—

== Medal table ==
Rank	Nation	Gold	Silver	Bronze	Total
1	United States	10	2	1	13
2	Brazil	2	2	1	5
3	Puerto Rico	1	0	1	2
4	Canada	0	1	0	1
Totals (4 entries)		13	5	3	21
