= 1999 Pan American Aerobic Gymnastics Championships =

International sports competition

The 1999 Pan American Aerobic Gymnastics Championships were held in Merida, Venezuela. The competition was organized by the Venezuelan Gymnastics Federation.

== Medalists ==
Event	Gold	Silver	Bronze
Mixed pair	Chile	Unknown	Unknown
Trio	Unknown	Unknown	Cuba
