= 1976 South American Artistic Gymnastics Championships =

International artistic gymnastics competition

The 1976 South American Artistic Gymnastics Championships were held in Porto Alegre, Brazil, November 12–14, 1976.

== Participating nations ==
- Brazil
- Chile
- Ecuador
- Peru
- Venezuela

== Medalists ==
Event	Gold	Silver	Bronze
Men
Team all-around	Brazil; Luis Schick; José Abramides; Alfredo Penz; Nilson Olsson; Mário Thomaz; Hélio Kleiber	Venezuela; Raul Penaloza; Angel Guindes	Ecuador; Ivan Ayala
Individual all-around	Luis Schick (BRA)	José Abramides (BRA)	Alfredo Penz (BRA)
Floor exercise	Hélio Kleiber (BRA)	Raul Penaloza (VEN)	Luis Schick (BRA)
Pommel horse	Luis Schick (BRA)	Nilson Olsson (BRA)	Ivan Ayala (ECU)
Rings	Mário Thomaz (BRA)	Luis Schick (BRA)	Raul Penaloza (VEN)
Vault	Isac Azica (PER)	Ricardo Mazabel (PER)	Angel Guindes (VEN)
Parallel bars	Luis Schick (BRA)	Alfredo Penz (BRA)	Dante Azica (PER)
Horizontal bar	Luis Schick (BRA)	Alfredo Penz (BRA)	Isac Azica (PER)
Women
Team all-around	Brazil; Giselle Radomsky; Silvia dos Anjos; Lilian Carrascoza; Ivana Montandon; Mirian Capra; Silvia Pinent	Chile; Marcela Urzusc; Linde Scheffield; Maria Luisa Saint	None awarded
Individual all-around	Giselle Radomsky (BRA)	Silvia dos Anjos (BRA)	Lilian Carrascoza (BRA)
Vault	Giselle Radomsky (BRA)	Silvia dos Anjos (BRA)	Marcela Urzusc (CHI)
Uneven bars	Silvia dos Anjos (BRA)	Giselle Radomsky (BRA)	Maria Luisa Saint (CHI)
Balance beam	Giselle Radomsky (BRA)	Silvia dos Anjos (BRA)	Linde Scheffield (CHI)
Floor exercise	Lilian Carrascoza (BRA)	Silvia Pinent (BRA)	Giannina Otoya (PER)
