= 1978 South American Artistic Gymnastics Championships =

International artistic gymnastics competition

The 1978 South American Artistic Gymnastics Championships were held in Lima, Peru, November 22–26, 1978. This was the fourth edition of the South American Artistic Gymnastics Championships.

== Participating nations ==
- Argentina
- Chile
- Colombia
- Ecuador
- Peru

== Medalists ==
Event	Gold	Silver	Bronze
Men
Team all-around	Ecuador; Eduardo Najera; Jorge Campos	Peru; Ricardo Mazabel	Argentina; Raimundo Blanco; Néstor Schettino; Juan D'Andrea; Walter Quintero; Miguel Angel Palmeiro; Pablo Otaño
Individual all-around	Eduardo Najera (ECU)	Jorge Campos (ECU)	Ricardo Mazabel (PER)
Pommel horse	Unknown	Miguel Angel Palmeiro (ARG)	Unknown
Vault	Unknown	Néstor Schettino (ARG)	Unknown
Women
Team all-around	Peru; Giannina Otoya; Karina de Pawlikowsky	Chile; Consuelo Sáenz; María Luisa Andueza	Argentina; Helena Lario; Cecilia Almada; Patricia Miracle; Silvia Moreno; Marisa Grigioni; Patricia Giuliano
Individual all-around	Giannina Otoya (PER)	Consuelo Sáenz (CHI)	Unknown
Vault	Giannina Otoya (PER)	Silvia Ponce (COL)	Unknown
Uneven bars	María Luisa Andueza (CHI)	Consuelo Sáenz (CHI)	Unknown
Balance beam	Karina de Pawlikowsky (PER)	Consuelo Sáenz (CHI)	Unknown
Floor exercise	Karina de Pawlikowsky (PER)	Giannina Otoya (PER)	Unknown
