= 2022 South American Aerobic Gymnastics Championships =

The 2022 South American Aerobic Gymnastics Championships were held in Lima, Peru, from August 24 to 28, 2022. The competition was organized by the Peruvian Gymnastics Federation and approved by the International Gymnastics Federation.

== Medalists ==
Event	Gold	Silver	Bronze
Individual men	Kevin Riveros (ARG)	William Florez (COL)	Paulo dos Santos (BRA)
Individual women	Thais Fernandez (PER)	Bianca Henriquez (CHI)	Brenda Weber (ARG)
Mixed pair	Argentina; Kevin Riveros; Gala Jofre	Chile; Giovanni Espinoza; Paula Zuñiga	Argentina; Henry Garcia; Brenda Weber
Trio	Chile; Bianca Henriquez; Giovanni Espinoza; Paula Zuñiga	Argentina; Rocio Veliz; Catalina Juri; Valentina Ramos	Argentina; Henry Garcia; Guadalupe Aberastain; Brenda Weber
Group	Argentina; Rocio Veliz; Catalina Juri; Valentina Ramos; Daiana Nanzer; Kevin Riveros	Peru; Alessia Rodriguez; Thais Fernandez; Rafaella Danovaro; Alessandra Pettrozi; Paulina Larrea	—
Team	Argentina	Chile	Peru
