= 2013 Pan American Aerobic Gymnastics Championships =

International sports competition

The 2013 Pan American Aerobic Gymnastics Championships were held in Santiago, Chile, October 20–27, 2013. The competition was organized by the Chilean Gymnastics Federation, and approved by the International Gymnastics Federation.

== Medalists ==
Event	Gold	Silver	Bronze
Individual men	Iván Veloz (MEX)	Lucas Barbosa (BRA)	Antonio Nahuel (ARG)
Individual women	Daiana Nanzer (ARG)	Luamar Martin (BRA)	Animsay Parra (VEN)
Mixed pair	Rocio Veliz (ARG); Antonio Nahuel (ARG)	Lucila Medina (ARG); Leonardo Perez (ARG)	Andrea Plaza (VEN); Orlando Parra (VEN)
Trio	Argentina	Argentina	Brazil
Group	Argentina	Brazil	Argentina
Aero-dance	Argentina	Chile	None awarded
