= 2014 South American Trampoline Championships =

The 2014 South American Trampoline Championships were held in Cochabamba, Bolivia, December 12–14, 2014. The competition was organized by the Bolivian Gymnastics Federation and approved by the International Gymnastics Federation.

== Medalists ==
Event	Gold	Silver	Bronze
Men's synchronized trampoline	Lucas Adorno (ARG); Federico Cury (ARG)	Unknown	Unknown
Women's synchronized trampoline	Ingrid Maior (BRA); Marcela Martins (BRA)	Mara Colombo (ARG); Marianela Galli (ARG)	Unknown
Men's double mini trampoline	Lucas Adorno (ARG)	Bernardo Aquino (ARG)	Mario Santana (BRA)
Women's double mini trampoline	Mariana Aquino (BRA)	Mara Colombo (ARG)	Marianela Galli (ARG)
Men's individual trampoline	Rafael Andrade (BRA) Lucas Adorno (ARG)	—	Bernardo Aquino (ARG)
Women's individual trampoline	Ingrid Maior (BRA)	Marcela Martins (BRA)	Marianela Galli (ARG)
