= Marcos Fuentes =

Mexican footballer and manager (born 1973)

Personal information
- Full name: René Marcos Fuentes Montoya
- Date of birth: 5 June 1973 (age 53)
- Place of birth: Naucalpan, State of Mexico, Mexico
- Height: 1.79 m (5 ft 10 in)
- Position: Defender

Senior career*
Years	Team	Apps	(Gls)
1996–1997	Necaxa	5	(0)

Managerial career
- 2008: Pato Baeza F.C.
- 2009: Necaxa Rayos (Assistant)
- 2011: Guayaberos de Calvillo
- 2011: Real Cuautitlán
- 2012: Atlético San Marcos
- 2012–2014: Real Cuautitlán
- 2015: Cañoneros de Campeche
- 2015: Santos de Soledad (Assistant)
- 2016–2017: Atlético Estado de México
- 2019–2021: Dongu
- 2021–2022: Cuervos Blancos
- 2022–2023: Dongu
- * Club domestic league appearances and goals

Marcos René Fuentes Montoya (born June 5, 1973) is a Mexican football manager and former player.
