= Lucas Barbosa (gymnast) =

Brazilian aerobic gymnast

- Full name: Lucas Santiago de Melo Barbosa
- Born: 4 July 1994 (age 32) Belo Horizonte, Brazil

Gymnastics career
- Discipline: Aerobic gymnastics
- Country represented: Brazil
- Club: Universidade Federal de Minas Gerais
- Head coach: Katia Lemos
- Assistant coaches: Pedro Augusto Amorim, Luiz Henrique Maciel
Medal record
Aerobic gymnastics
Representing Brazil
Event / 1st / 2nd / 3rd; FIG World Cup series / 2 / 3 / 3
World Games
Gold medal – first place	2022 Birmingham	Mixed Pair
World Championships
Silver medal – second place	2022 Guimarães	Mixed Pair
Bronze medal – third place	2021 Baku	Individual
Bronze medal – third place	2024 Pesaro	Mixed Pair
Pan American Championships
Gold medal – first place	2016 Lima	Individual
Gold medal – first place	2016 Lima	Mixed Pair
Gold medal – first place	2017 Bogotá	Mixed Pair
Gold medal – first place	2018 Lima	Mixed Pair
Gold medal – first place	2022 Cúcuta	Individual
Silver medal – second place	2013 Santiago	Individual
Silver medal – second place	2016 Lima	Trio
Silver medal – second place	2017 Bogotá	Individual
Silver medal – second place	2018 Lima	Individual
South American Championships
Gold medal – first place	2014 Asunción	Individual
Gold medal – first place	2015 Lima	Individual
Gold medal – first place	2016 Bogotá	Individual
Gold medal – first place	2016 Bogotá	Mixed Pair
Gold medal – first place	2017 Lima	Individual
Gold medal – first place	2017 Lima	Mixed Pair
Gold medal – first place	2018 Lima	Individual
Gold medal – first place	2018 Lima	Mixed Pair
Gold medal – first place	2019 Melgar	Individual
Gold medal – first place	2019 Melgar	Mixed Pair

Lucas Barbosa (born 4 July 1994) is a Brazilian aerobic gymnast who has competed both as an individual and in mixed pairs; his longtime aerobic gymnastics partner is Tamirez Silva. He has won silver in the mixed pair event at the 2022 World Championships, as well as bronze in the men's individual event at the 2021 World Championships and in the mixed pair event at the 2024 World Championships. He also won gold in the mixed pair event at the 2022 World Games.

== Early life ==
Barbosa has a brother. He began artistic gymnastics at age 13 and later switched to aerobic gymnastics at age 16.

== Career ==
Barbosa joined the national team at age 17. There he met Silva, and they began training together, though they initially did not think their different styles would match well with each other. They train four hours a day together when they do not have upcoming competitions and eight hours a day before important championships.

At the 2017 Pan American Championships, Barbosa won silver in the individual event and gold with Silva in the mixed pairs event.

In 2018, Barbosa won three medals on the World Cup series in the men's individual competition: silver in Cantanhede, Portugal, bronze in Tokyo, and lastly gold in Plovdiv. At the end of the year, at the 2018 Pan American Championships, he once again won gold with Silva in the mixed pairs event and silver in the individual event.

In 2021, at the World Championships in Baku, Barbosa won bronze in the individual event, which was Brazil's first medal at the World Championships since 2010. His routine was set to the song I'm Still Standing by Elton John, which Barbosa said he chose because "it represents me a lot". The bronze medal meant that Barbosa, who worked as a DJ and nightclub performer, received more financial support to continue his training.

During the 2022 season, Barbosa choreographed his own individual routine for the first time; the routine was Spider-Man-themed. Barbosa said that he was pleased with his artistic score at the Cantanhede World Cup, and he added, "I'm always trying to make it more artistic." Although neither he nor Silva advanced to the individual finals at the World Championships in June, together they won silver in the mixed pair final to a routine using music from The Lion King.

In July, at the 2022 World Games held in Birmingham, Alabama, he and Silva won gold in the mixed pair event. They were selected as the World Games Athletes of the Day after their victory. Barbosa thanked the Brazilian Gymnastics Federation for their increased support and noted that the organization had begun to pay more attention to aerobic gymnastics after they were successful in an online program in 2020 during early stages of the COVID-19 pandemic.

At the 2023 Pan American Championships, Barbosa won gold both as an individual and in mixed pairs.

In 2024, at the World Championships in Pesaro, he and Silva won bronze. Barbosa said that they were very happy with the result and that he was especially happy to have won the medal with Silva, because "she is my sister. We are very good friends". They announced that this was their last time competing together at the World Championships, though they were still considering whether they would compete at the upcoming 2025 World Games.
