= 1957 South American Artistic Gymnastics Championships =

International artistic gymnastics competition

The 1957 South American Artistic Gymnastics Championships were held in Buenos Aires, Argentina, December 13, 1957.

== Participating nations ==
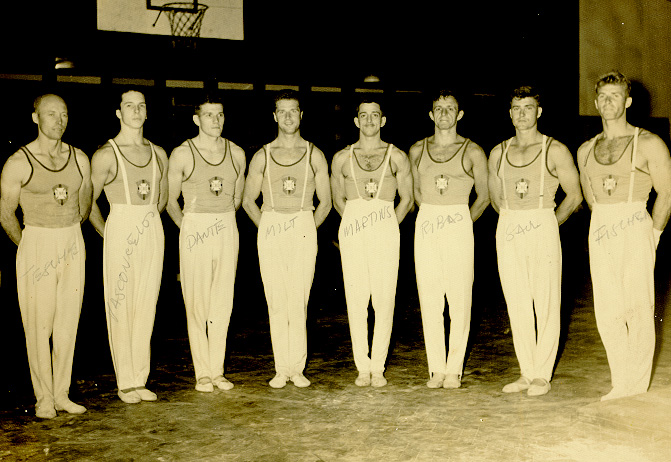
Brazil's men's team at the 1957 South American Artistic Gymnastics Championships

- Argentina
- Brazil
- Uruguay

== Medalists ==
| Event | Gold | Silver | Bronze |
|---|---|---|---|
Men
| Team all-around | Argentina; Ricardo Licenziato; César Bonoris; José Flecha; Bautista Digiacomo; Juan Caviglia; Jorge Guerreiro | Brazil; Arno Tesche; Luiz Vasconcelos; Siegfried Fischer; Nelson Saul; Dante Gnoatto; Guilherme Meyer | Uruguay; Omar Lagomarsino; Pedro Sleslisepecvie; Hugo Prigue; Manoel Alifa |
| Individual all-around | Ricardo Licenziato (ARG) | Arno Tesche (BRA) | César Bonoris (ARG) |
| Floor exercise | Juan Caviglia (ARG) | Unknown | Unknown |
| Pommel horse | Ricardo Licenziato (ARG) | Arno Tesche (BRA) | Unknown |
| Rings | Arno Tesche (BRA) | Unknown | Unknown |
| Vault | José Flecha (ARG) César Bonoris (ARG) | None awarded | Nelson Saul (BRA) Luis Vasconcelos (BRA) |
| Parallel bars | Ricardo Licenziato (ARG) | Unknown | Unknown |
| Horizontal bar | Ricardo Licenziato (ARG) | Siegfried Fischer (BRA) | Unknown |
