= 2009 Trampoline World Championships =

26th Trampoline World Championships

The 26th Trampoline World Championships were held at the Petersburg Sports and Concert Complex in Saint Petersburg, Russia from 11 to 14 November 2009.

== Programme ==
11.11.2009 Wednesday

- 11:20 - 14:40 Individual TRA Qualifications for Groups 1-4
- 15:35 - 18:05 Individual TRA Qualifications for Groups 5-7

12.11.2009 Thursday

- 11:00 - 13:00 TUM Women and DMT Men Qualifications
- 14:10 - 16:10 TUM Men and DMT Women Qualifications
- 19:00 TRA Women Team Final
- 19:46 TRA Men Team Final

13.11.2009 Friday

- 11:00 - 11:30 TRA Synchro Women and Men Qualifications
- 18:00 DMT Women Team Final
- 18:27 TUM Women Team Final
- 18:54 DMT Men Team Final
- 19:55 TRA Synchro Women Final
- 20:17 TUM Men Team Final
- 20:44 Individual TRA Men Final

14.11.2009 Saturday

- 14:00 DMT Men Final
- 14:29 TUM Men Final
- 14:57 DMT Women Final
- 16:00 TRA Synchro Men Final
- 16:22 TUM Women Final
- 16:50 Individual TRA Women Final

== Medal winners ==
Event	Gold	Silver	Bronze
Men
Trampoline Team	China (CHN)	Belarus (BLR)	Russia (RUS)
Double Mini Team	Portugal (POR)	Russia (RUS)	United States (USA)
Tumbling Team	China (CHN)	Russia (RUS)	Belarus (BLR)
Individual	Dong Dong (CHN)	Lu Chunlong (CHN)	Yasuhiro Ueyama (JPN)
Double Mini	André Lico (POR)	Tim Lunding (SWE)	André Fernandes (POR)
Tumbling	Tagir Murtazaev (RUS)	Yang Song (CHN)	Mikhail Kostyanov (RUS)
Synchro	Tetsuya Sotomura (JPN); Yasuhiro Ueyama (JPN)	Sebastien Martiny (FRA); Gregoire Pennes (FRA)	Oleksandr Chernonos (UKR); Yuriy Nikitin (UKR)
Women
Trampoline Team	China (CHN)	Russia (RUS)	Canada (CAN)
Double Mini Team	Russia (RUS)	Canada (CAN)	United States (USA)
Tumbling Team	Russia (RUS)	United States (USA)	Canada (CAN)
Synchro	Li Dan (CHN); Zhong Xingping (CHN)	Karen Cockburn (CAN); Rosannagh MacLennan (CAN)	Anna Savkina (UZB); Ekaterina Khilko (UZB)
Double Mini	Victoria Voronina (RUS)	Galina Goncharenko (RUS)	Corissa Boychuk (CAN)
Tumbling	Anna Korobeynikova (RUS)	Elena Krasnokutskaya (RUS)	Ashley Speed (CAN)
Individual	Huang Shanshan (CHN)	He Wenna (CHN)	Karen Cockburn (CAN)

== Results ==
=== Men ===
==== Individual ====
Rank	Country	Gymnast	Point
Gold medal	China	Dong Dong	42.900
Silver medal	China	Lu Chunlong	42.300
Bronze medal	Japan	Yasuhiro Ueyama	42.100
4	Japan	Masaki Ito	42.100
5	Russia	Dmitry Ushakov	41.000
6	Portugal	Diogo Ganchinho	40.200
7	Great Britain	James Higgins	39.600
8	Belarus	Mikalai Kazak	39.100

==== Synchro ====
Rank	Country	Gymnast	Point
Gold medal	Japan	Tetsuya Sotomura; Yasuhiro Ueyama	50.800
Silver medal	France	Sébastien Martiny; Grégoire Pennes	50.000
Bronze medal	Ukraine	Yuri Nikitin; Olexander Chernonos	50.000
4	China	Dong Dong; Tu Xiao	49.900
5	Canada	Jason Burnett; Charles Thibault	49.300
6	United States	Logan Dooley; Steven Gluckstein	49.300
7	Germany	Markus Kubicka; Karsten Kuritz	48.700
8	Poland	Tomasz Adamczyk; Lukasz Tomaszewski	19.300

==== Double Mini ====
Rank	Country	Gymnast	Point
Gold medal	Portugal	André Lico	75.500
Silver medal	Sweden	Tim Lunding	69.600
Bronze medal	Portugal	André Fernandes	69.300
4	Brazil	Bruno Martini	67.800
5	Russia	Evgeny Chernoivanov	60.300
6	Russia	Dmitry Fedorovskiy	59.200
7	Canada	Alexander Seifert	58.900
8	United States	Austin White	35.300

==== Tumbling ====
Rank	Country	Gymnast	Point
Gold medal	Russia	Tagir Murtazaev	77.300
Silver medal	China	Yang Song	75.000
Bronze medal	Russia	Mikhail Kostyanov	73.900
4	Ukraine	Viktor Kyforenko	73.000
5	China	Zhang Lingfeng	71.100
6	United States	Kalon Ludvigson	68.900
7	Great Britain	Michael Barrnes	63.500
8	Ukraine	Siarhei Artsemenka	52.700

==== Trampoline Team ====
Rank	Country	Gymnast	Point
Gold medal	China	Lu Chunlong; Ye Shuai; Dong Dong; Tu Xiao	126.70
Silver medal	Belarus	Yakau Rakitski; Mikalai Kazak; Yauhen Zhukouski; Viatchaslau Modzel	120.50
Bronze medal	Russia	Alexander Leven; Dmitry Fedorovskiy; Dimitri Ushakov; Sergei Chumak	117.00
4	United States	Neil Gulati; Michael Devine; Logan Dooley; Steven Gluckstein	88.90
5	Japan	Shunsuke Nagasaki; Tetsuya Sotomura; Yasuhiro Ueyama; Masaki Ito	79.50

==== Double Mini Team ====
Rank	Country	Gymnast	Point
Gold medal	Portugal	Andre Lico; André Fernandes; André Pocinho; Bruno Nobre	110.80
Silver medal	Russia	Sergey Kovalev; Kirill Ivanov; Evgeny Chernoivanov; Dmitry Fedorovskiy	110.50
Bronze medal	United States	Stephen Raymond; Anthony Doles; Austin White; Kalon Ludvigson	98.70
4	Great Britain	Dominic Swaffer; Jason Plowman; Matthew Swaffer	69.20
5	Canada	Luke Friesen; Scott Young; Alexander Seifert; Kyle Soehn	68.30

==== Tumbling Team ====
Rank	Country	Gymnast	Point
Gold medal	China	Ma Jie; Yang Song; Tao Yi; Zhang Lingfeng	110.90
Silver medal	Russia	Mikhail Kostyanov; Evgeny Zinukov; Tagir Murtazaev; Andrey Krylov	109.40
Bronze medal	Belarus	Dzmitry Darashuk; Andrei Kabishau; Siarhei Prymakou; Siarhei Artsemenka	104.50
4	Great Britain	Charlie Burrows; Michael Barnes; Greg Boosey; Daniel lannigan	102.50
5	Ukraine	Artem Pysaryev; Iurii Freiuk; Vladyslav Sheremeta; Viktor Kyforenko	96.10

=== Women ===
==== Individual ====
Rank	Country	Gymnast	Point
Gold medal	China	Huang Shanshan	39.500
Silver medal	China	He Wenna	39.400
Bronze medal	Canada	Karen Cockburn	38.700
4	Canada	Rosannagh MacLennan	38.400
5	Russia	Victoria Voronina	37.500
6	Russia	Irina Karavaeva	37.300
7	Uzbekistan	Ekaterina Khilko	37.300
8	France	Marina Ducroux	37.000

==== Synchro ====
Rank	Country	Gymnast	Point
Gold medal	China	Li Dan; Zhong Xingping	47.600
Silver medal	Canada	Karen Cockburn; Rosannagh Maclennan	48.700
Bronze medal	Uzbekistan	Ekaterina Khilko; Anna Savkina	45.300
4	Netherlands	Tara Fokke; Kirsten Boersma	45.200
5	Great Britain	Cara Jamieson; Katherine Driscoll	44.800
6	France	Marina Ducroux; Marine Jurbert	41.500
7	Ukraine	Nataliia Moskvina; Maryna Kyiko	37.300
8	Russia	Irina Karavaeva; Victoria Voronina	32.100

==== Double Mini ====
Rank	Country	Gymnast	Point
Gold medal	Russia	Victoria Voronina	68.300
Silver medal	Russia	Galina Goncharenko	68.000
Bronze medal	Canada	Corissa Boychuk	67.100
4	United States	Aubree Balkan	67.000
5	Canada	Julie Warnock	65.800
6	Portugal	Silvia Saiote	56.200
7	Portugal	Andreia Robalo	55.300
8	Great Britain	Adeva Bryan	54.900

==== Tumbling ====
Rank	Country	Gymnast	Point
Gold medal	Russia	Anna Korobeynikova	69.400
Silver medal	Russia	Elena Krasnokutskaya	66.900
Bronze medal	Canada	Ashley Speed	62.800
4	United States	Kaitlin Tortorich	66.100
5	Canada	Emily Smith	60.800
6	Great Britain	Zara McLean	60.000
7	South Africa	Bianca Budler	59.100
8	Great Britain	Rachael Letsche	28.300

==== Trampoline Team ====
Rank	Country	Gymnast	Point
Gold medal	China	Huang Shanshan; Li Dan; He Wenna; Zhong Xingping	117.00
Silver medal	Russia	Anastasia Velichko; Irina Karavayeva; Galina Goncharenko; Victoria Voronina	110.30
Bronze medal	Canada	Rosannagh MacLennan; Karen Cockburn; Kailey McLeod; Samantha Sendel	109.60
4	Belarus	Hanna Harchonak; Tatsiana Leaniuk; Katsiarynia Miranava; Tatsiana Piatrenia	103.40
5	United States	Hayley Butcher; Alaina Williams; Nani Vercruyssen	106.00

==== Double Mini Team ====
Rank	Country	Gymnast	Point
Gold medal	Russia	Svetlana Balandina; Anastasia Velichko; Galina Goncharenko; Victoria Voronina	105.10
Silver medal	Canada	Corissa Boychuk; Julie Warnock; Gillian Bruce; Chelsea Nerpio	102.60
Bronze medal	United States	Sarah Gandy; Sarah Prosen; Aubree Balkan	101.90
4	Brazil	Samantha Oliveira; Renata Teles; Barbara Silva; Virginia Lins	95.20
5	Portugal	Andreia Robalo; Silvia Saiote; Ana Simoes; Nicole Pacheco	91.50

==== Tumbling Team ====
Rank	Country	Gymnast	Point
Gold medal	Russia	Anastasia Isupova; Anzhelika Soldatkina; Elena Krasnokutskaya; Anna Korobeynikova	100.90
Silver medal	United States	Amy McDonald; Kaitlin Tortorich; Leanne Seitzinger; Susannah Johnson	94.00
Bronze medal	Canada	Kylie Petrie; Emily Smith; Ashley Speed; Jordan Sugrim	93.40
4	Great Britain	Rachael Letsche; Sarah Turner; Zara McLean; Jennifer Dawes	90.20
5	Ukraine	Olga Pashkova; Kateryna Bayeva; Orlena Orlova; Orlena Chabanenko	84.20

== Medal table ==
Rank	Nation	Gold	Silver	Bronze	Total
1	China (CHN)	6	3	0	9
2	Russia (RUS)	5	5	2	12
3	Portugal (POR)	2	0	1	3
4	Japan (JPN)	1	0	1	2
5	Canada (CAN)	0	2	5	7
6	United States (USA)	0	1	2	3
7	Belarus (BLR)	0	1	1	2
8	France (FRA)	0	1	0	1
8	Sweden (SWE)	0	1	0	1
10	Ukraine (UKR)	0	0	1	1
10	Uzbekistan (UZB)	0	0	1	1
Totals (11 entries)		14	14	14	42
