= Gymnastics at the 2011 Pan American Games – Men's trampoline =

Men's trampoline at the 2011 Pan American Games
- Venue: Nissan Gymnastics Stadium
- Dates: October 17–18
- Competitors: 8 from 5 nations

Medalists
Gold medal	Keegan Soehn	Canada
Silver medal	Rafael Andrade	Brazil
Bronze medal	Jose Alberto Vargas	Mexico

The men's trampoline competition of the trampoline events at the 2011 Pan American Games was held between October 17–18 at the Nissan Gymnastics Stadium. The draw for the competition took place on August 1, 2011 in Guadalajara. The defending Pan American Games champion was Chris Estrada of the United States.

== Schedule ==
All times are Central Standard Time (UTC-6).

Date	Time	Round
October 17, 2011	18:20	Qualification
October 18, 2011	18:00	Final

== Results ==
=== Qualification ===
Rank	Athlete	Nationality	Total	Notes
1	Keegan Soehn	Canada	104.030	Q
2	Rafael Andrade	Brazil	95.900	Q
3	Charles Thibault	Canada	94.335	Q
4	Jose Alberto Vargas	Mexico	93.470	Q
5	Nathanael Camara	Puerto Rico	92.395	Q
6	Steven Gluckstein	United States	79.260	Q
7	Jeffrey Gluckstein	United States	46.500	Q
8	Carlos Ramirez Pala	Brazil	45.015	Q

=== Final ===
Rank	Athlete	Nationality	Total	Notes
1st place, gold medalist(s)	Keegan Soehn	Canada	55.535	
2nd place, silver medalist(s)	Rafael Andrade	Brazil	52.265	
3rd place, bronze medalist(s)	Jose Alberto Vargas	Mexico	21.130	
4	Jeffrey Gluckstein	United States	17.010	
5	Carlos Ramirez Pala	Brazil	12.180	
6	Steven Gluckstein	United States	12.035	
7	Nathanael Camara	Puerto Rico	11.325	
–	Charles Thibault	Canada	–	DNS
