= Gymnastics at the 2015 Pan American Games – Men's trampoline =

Men's trampoline at the 2015 Pan American Games
- Venue: Toronto Coliseum
- Dates: July 18–19
- Competitors: 8 from 6 nations
- Winning score: 56.405

Medalists
Gold medal	Keegan Soehn	Canada
Silver medal	Steven Gluckstein	United States
Bronze medal	Ángel Hernández	Colombia

The men's trampoline gymnastic event at the 2015 Pan American Games was held on July 18 and 19 at the Toronto Coliseum.

== Schedule ==
All times are Eastern Daylight Time (UTC-4).

Date	Time	Round
July 18, 2015	20:00	Qualification 1st Routine
July 18, 2015	20:30	Qualification 2nd Routine
July 19, 2015	19:45	Finals

== Results ==
=== Qualification ===
Position	Athlete	Compulsory	Voluntary	Penalty	Total	Notes
1	Keegan Soehn (CAN)	48.470 (1)	55.400 (1)		103.870	Q
2	Steven Gluckstein (USA)	48.105 (2)	55.065 (3)		103.170	Q
3	Ángel Hernández (COL)	46.460 (7)	55.395 (2)		101.855	Q
4	Jason Burnett (CAN)	47.165 (5)	54.395 (4)		101.560	Q
5	Logan Dooley (USA)	47.815 (3)	51.485 (7)		99.300	Q
6	Jose Vargas Garcia (MEX)	46.705 (6)	51.530 (6)		98.235	Q
7	Lucas Adorno (ARG)	45.960 (8)	51.910 (5)		97.870	Q
8	Carlos Ramirez Pala (BRA)	47.790 (4)	41.955 (8)		89.745	Q

=== Final ===
Position	Athlete	Difficulty	Execution	Flight	Penalty	Total
1st place, gold medalist(s)	Keegan Soehn (CAN)	16.500	23.400	16.505		56.405
2nd place, silver medalist(s)	Steven Gluckstein (USA)	15.800	23.100	16.695		55.595
3rd place, bronze medalist(s)	Ángel Hernández (COL)	16.900	21.900	16.390		55.190
4	Jason Burnett (CAN)	16.200	22.500	16.390		55.090
5	Lucas Adorno (ARG)	14.800	22.800	16.925		54.525
6	Jose Vargas Garcia (MEX)	15.400	21.600	16.335		53.335
7	Logan Dooley (USA)	16.200	20.700	16.180		53.080
8	Carlos Ramirez Pala (BRA)	11.300	13.800	12.070		37.170
