= Samantha Sendel =

Canadian trampoline gymnast

- Full name: Samantha Faye Sendel
- Nickname: Sam
- Born: October 10, 1991 (age 34) Montreal, Quebec, Canada

Gymnastics career
- Discipline: Trampoline gymnastics
- Country represented: Canada; (2008–2016)
- Club: Skyriders Trampoline Place, Richmond Hill, ON, CAN
- Head coaches: Dave Ross, Ken Soehn
Medal record
Women's trampoline gymnastics
Representing Canada
World Championships
Silver medal – second place	2014 Daytona Beach	Synchro
Silver medal – second place	2013 Sofia	Team
Pan American Championships
Gold medal – first place	2014 Mississauga	Synchro
Gold medal – first place	2014 Mississauga	Team
Gold medal – first place	2012 Querétaro	Individual
Gold medal – first place	2010 Daytona Beach	Synchro
Gold medal – first place	2010 Daytona Beach	Team
Gold medal – first place	2008 Buenos Aires	Synchro
Silver medal – second place	2014 Mississauga	Individual
Silver medal – second place	2012 Querétaro	Synchro
Silver medal – second place	2012 Querétaro	Team
Bronze medal – third place	2008 Buenos Aires	Individual
Pacific Rim Championships
Gold medal – first place	2014 Richmond	Synchro
Silver medal – second place	2014 Richmond	Team

Samantha Faye Sendel (born October 10, 1991 in Montreal, Quebec) is a Canadian retired individual and synchronised trampoline gymnast. She is a two-time silver medalist at the World Championships (team event in 2013 and synchro event in 2014) and also a bronze medalist (2009 team event). She now performs in Cirque du Soleil.

== Gymnastics career ==
Sendel began gymnastics at age 3. She particularly enjoyed jumping on the trampoline. After her parents watched the trampoline event at the 2000 Summer Olympics, they asked her if she wanted to try it, and she joined a competitive program that year.

Sendel started competing internationally in 2007, when she won the silver medal at the World Age Group Championships held in Quebec City, Canada. She had the highest difficulty score of the female competitors in her age range. The next year, she competed at the 2008 Pan American Championships and won the bronze medal in the individual event as well as gold in the synchronized event with partner Rosie MacLennan. She also competed at the 2008 Pacific Rim Championships and won silver in the junior women's event.

Sendel competed at her first World Championships in 2009. She was part of the Canadian team that won bronze in the team event.

In 2010, Sendel competed at the 2010 Pan American Championships, where she won gold in the senior synchro event with partner Samantha Smith. Of the two teams competing in the team competition, the Canadian team, including Sendel, won gold. Individually, she placed 9th.

The next year, she competed at the 2011 World Championships and finished 15th in the synchro event. In 2012, she won the 2012 Pan American Championships individual event, then won silver with Smith in the synchro event final and silver in the team event with Smith and Anita Cirillo.

In 2013, she and Rosie MacLennan won two gold medals at FIG World Cup events. In July, they competed at the World Games and placed 4th. In November, at the 2013 World Championships, she won silver in the team event with Rosie MacLennan and Samantha Smith. Competing in the synchro event, she and MacLennan qualified in first place. They placed 8th in the synchro final after Sendel had a crash. However, she recovered to finish 5th in the individual final after attempting the highest difficulty she had ever performed in competition. She said afterward, "I had done parts of the routine in training previous to coming to the worlds but never the complete routine so that was very exciting." At the end of the year, it was announced that she was one of 67 athletes to receive a grant from the Canadian Imperial Bank of Commerce.

At the 2014 Pacific Rim Championships, held in April, she placed 4th in the individual event but won the synchro event with MacLennan and won silver in the team event. In August, she competed at the 2014 Pan American Championships, where she won silver individually and won another gold in the synchro event with MacLennan. In the team event, she, MacLennan, and Karen Cockburn took gold. Ahead of the World Championships in June, it was announced that Sendel had suffered a concussion and had withdrawn from the individual competition. She ultimately competed in the syncho event, where she and MacLennan won silver.

Sendel and MacLennan won the synchro event silver at the first World Cup of the 2015 season. At the World Championships, they finished 4th. Individually, Sendel placed 36th in qualifiers and did not advance to the final.

At the 2016 World Cup event held in Arosa, Switzerland, both Sendel and Samantha Smith attempted to break the world record for difficulty by including rare, difficult variations of triple somersaults; however, neither finished their optional routine. Sendel was Canada's alternate female trampoline competitor for the 2016 Summer Olympics in Rio de Janeiro.

== Post-gymnastics career ==
Sendel began to perform in shows while still competing, starting when she was 12. After retiring from her competitive career, she joined Cirque du Soleil.

== Personal life ==
Sendel lives in Aurora, Ontario. After the Canadian Olympic Committee unveiled LGBT initiatives in December 2014, including a partnership with You Can Play, she came out as a lesbian.

She studied kinesiology at the University of Toronto.
