= Ángel Hernández (gymnast) =

Colombian trampoline gymnast (born 1995)

- Full name: Ángel Hernández Recalde
- Born: 6 January 1995 (age 31) Albacete, Spain
- Height: 171 cm (5 ft 7 in)

Gymnastics career
- Discipline: Trampoline gymnastics
- Country represented: Colombia
- Former countries represented: Spain
- Club: Antioquia
Medal record
Men's trampoline gymnastics
Event	1st	2nd	3rd
Pacific Rim Championships	0	1	0
Pan American Games	1	0	1
Pan American Championships	5	0	0
CAC Games	1	2	0
South American Games	2	0	0
South American Championships	3	2	2
Bolivarian Games	3	0	0
European Junior Championships	1	0	0
Total	16	5	3
Representing Colombia
Pacific Rim Championships
Silver medal – second place	2018 Medellín	Individual
Pan American Games
Gold medal – first place	2023 Santiago	Individual
Bronze medal – third place	2015 Toronto	Individual
Pan American Championships
Gold medal – first place	2021 Rio de Janeiro	Individual
Gold medal – first place	2022 Rio de Janeiro	Individual
Gold medal – first place	2022 Rio de Janeiro	Synchronised
Gold medal – first place	2022 Rio de Janeiro	Team
Gold medal – first place	2023 Monterrey	Individual
Central American and Caribbean Games
Gold medal – first place	2018 Barranquilla	Individual
Silver medal – second place	2014 Veracruz	Individual
Silver medal – second place	2018 Barranquilla	Synchronised
South American Games
Gold medal – first place	2018 Cochabamba	Individual
Gold medal – first place	2022 Asunción	Individual
South American Championships
Gold medal – first place	2013 Bogotá	Individual
Gold medal – first place	2015 Bogotá	Synchronised
Gold medal – first place	2016 Bogotá	Synchronised
Silver medal – second place	2013 Bogotá	Team
Silver medal – second place	2016 Bogotá	Individual
Bronze medal – third place	2013 Bogotá	Synchronised
Bronze medal – third place	2015 Bogotá	Team
Bolivarian Games
Gold medal – first place	2017 Santa Marta	Individual
Gold medal – first place	2017 Santa Marta	Synchronised
Gold medal – first place	2022 Valledupar	Individual
Representing Spain
European Junior Championships
Gold medal – first place	2012 Saint Petersburg	Individual

Ángel Hernández Recalde (born 6 January 1995) is a Spanish-born trampoline gymnast that represents Colombia. He is the 2023 Pan American Games champion in individual trampoline and the 2015 Pan American Games bronze medalist. He is a five-time champion at the Pan American Championships and the 2018 Central American and Caribbean Games individual champion. He represented Colombia at the 2020 and 2024 Summer Olympics, finishing ninth and seventh, respectively.

Hernández represented Spain at the junior level and won the 2012 Junior European individual title.

== Early life ==
Hernández was born on 6 January 1995 in Albacete, Spain, to a Colombian mother. He started trampoline gymnastics at the age of six after following his sister into the sport. His sister, Katish Hernández, has also represented Colombia internationally in trampoline and won three medals at the 2019 South American Championships.

== Gymnastics career ==
=== 2012–2014 ===
Hernández won the individual title at the 2012 Junior European Championships. He made his senior international debut at the 2012 Albacete World Cup and finished sixth.

Hernández switched to competing for Colombia, his mother's birth country, in 2013, and moved to Bogotá. The whole family moved from Spain to Colombia, and their coach José Miguel Cantos moved with them. He won the individual title at the 2013 South American Championships which were hosted in Bogotá. He also won a silver medal in the team event and a bronze medal in the synchro event.

Hernández was on track to win the gold medal at the 2014 Central American and Caribbean Games, but a mistake on the final jump cost him the title. He then competed at his first World Championships in 2014, finished 43rd in the individual qualification round.

=== 2015–2016 ===
Hernández won a bronze medal at the 2015 Pan American Games behind Keegan Soehn and Steven Gluckstein. He then competed at the 2015 South American Championships and won a gold medal in the synchro event with his brother-in-law, Alvaro Calero. They then finished 21st in the qualification round at the 2015 World Championships, and Hernández finished 23rd in the individual semifinal.

Hernández failed to qualify for the 2016 Summer Olympics. His coach then decided to move to the United States, so Hernández's mother began coaching him in Medellín.

=== 2017–2018 ===
Hernández won gold medals in both the individual and syncho events at the 2017 Bolivarian Games. He placed seventh as an individual at the 2017 Loule World Cup and eighth in the synchro event. Then at the Valladolid World Cup, he finished sixth in the individual event and eighth in the synchro event.

Hernández won the silver medal in the individual event at the 2018 Pacific Rim Championships. He then won the gold medal at the 2018 South American Games, and he also won the individual gold medal at the 2018 Central American and Caribbean Games, where he also won a synchro silver medal.

=== 2020–2021 ===
During the start of the COVID-19 pandemic in 2020, Hernández had surgery for an old knee injury. He returned to competition in 2021, winning the gold medal in the individual event at the 2021 Pan American Championships and qualifying for the Summer Olympics. Hernández represented Colombia at the 2020 Summer Olympics, held in 2021, and finished ninth in the qualification round, making him the first reserve for the final. He was the first trampoline gymnast to represent Colombia at the Olympics. After the competition, he was temporarily stuck in Japan due to not meeting the required quarantine protocols. He criticized the Colombian Olympic Committee for a lack of organization and not purchasing the correct plane tickets for him.

=== 2022–2024 ===
Hernández led the Colombian team to a gold medal at the 2022 Pan American Championships, and he also won gold medals in the individual and synchro events. He also won an individual gold medal at the 2022 Bolivarian Games. He then successfully defended his South American Games title. He qualified for the individual final at the 2022 World Championships, finishing seventh.

Hernández won the individual gold medal at the 2023 Pan American Championships. He then won the gold medal at the 2023 Pan American Games and received the continental berth for the 2024 Summer Olympics. Less than a week later, he traveled to Birmingham for the 2023 World Championships. He made mistakes in the qualification round, finishing last out of all the competing athletes.

Hernández represented Colombia at the 2024 Summer Olympics at the age of 29, making him the oldest competitor in the men's trampoline event. He qualified for the final in eighth place and ultimately finished seventh.

== See also ==
- Nationality changes in gymnastics
