= 2010 Pan American Trampoline and Tumbling Championships =

International sports competition

The 2010 Pan American Trampoline and Tumbling Championships were held in Daytona Beach, United States, March 25–27, 2010.

== Medalists ==
Event	Gold	Silver	Bronze
Men
Individual trampoline	Steven Gluckstein (USA)	Logan Dooley (USA)	Carlos Ramirez Pala (BRA)
Synchronized trampoline	Logan Dooley (USA); Steven Gluckstein (USA)	Kyle Soehn (CAN); Keegan Soehn (CAN)	Jesse Carisse (CAN); Phil Barbaro (CAN)
Trampoline team	United States; Steven Gluckstein; Logan Dooley; Michael Devine; Neil Gulati	Canada; Keegan Soehn; Phil Barbaro; Kyle Soehn; Jesse Carisse	Brazil; Carlos Ramirez Pala; Rafael Andrade; Rodrigo Pacheco
Double mini	Austin White (USA)	Bruno Martini (BRA)	Keegan Soehn (CAN)
Double mini team	Canada; Keegan Soehn; Jon Schwaiger; Kyle Clemmer; Kyle Soehn	Brazil; Bruno Martini; Arthur Iotte; Neivaldo Neves; Edmon Abreu	None awarded
Tumbling	Bruno Martini (BRA)	Jon Schwaiger (CAN)	Junior Charpentier-Leclerc (CAN)
Women
Individual trampoline	Nani Vercruyssen (USA)	Samantha Smith (CAN)	Joana Perez (BRA)
Synchronized trampoline	Samantha Sendel (CAN); Samantha Smith (CAN)	Bethany Gee (CAN); Kailey McLeod (CAN)	Haylay Butcher (USA); Nani Vercruyssen (USA)
Trampoline team	Canada; Kailey McLeod; Samantha Smith; Bethany Gee; Samantha Sendel	Brazil; Joana Perez; Vanessa dos Santos; Taissa Garcia	None awarded
Double mini	Corissa Boychuk (CAN)	Sarah Gandy (USA)	Chelsea Nerpio (CAN)
Tumbling	Meghan Hefford (CAN)	Julie Warnock (CAN)	Catherine McNutt (CAN)

== Pan American Cup ==
Unrelated to the 2010 Pan American Trampoline Championships, an event known as the Pan American Cup was organized in Guadalajara, Mexico, on December 4, 2010, as a qualifying event for the individual trampoline competition at the 2011 Pan American Games. The results of the 2010 Pan American Cup are as follows.

Event	Gold	Silver	Bronze
Men's individual trampoline	Logan Dooley (USA)	Charles Thibault (CAN)	Rodrigo Pacheco (BRA)
Women's individual trampoline	Karen Cockburn (CAN)	Rosannagh MacLennan (CAN)	Nani Vercruyssen (USA)
