= Samantha Smith (gymnast) =

Canadian trampoline gymnast

- Born: April 1, 1992 (age 34) Toronto, Ontario
- Height: 150 cm (4 ft 11 in)

Gymnastics career
- Discipline: Trampoline gymnastics
- Country represented: Canada
- Training location: Vancouver, British Columbia
- Club: Shasta Trampoline
- Head coach: Curt De Wolff
Medal record
Women's trampoline gymnastics
Representing Canada
World Championships
Silver medal – second place	2013 Sofia	Trampoline team
Silver medal – second place	2014 Daytona Beach	Synchro
Bronze medal – third place	2011 Birmingham	Trampoline team
Bronze medal – third place	2019 Tokyo	Individual team
Bronze medal – third place	2019 Tokyo	Synchro
Pan American Games
Gold medal – first place	2019 Lima	Individual
Pan American Championships
Gold medal – first place	2010 Daytona Beach	Trampoline team
Gold medal – first place	2010 Daytona Beach	Synchro
Gold medal – first place	2014 Mississauga	Trampoline team
Gold medal – first place	2023 Monterrey	Trampoline team
Silver medal – second place	2010 Daytona Beach	Individual
Silver medal – second place	2012 Querétaro	Trampoline team
Silver medal – second place	2012 Querétaro	Individual
Silver medal – second place	2012 Querétaro	Synchro

Samantha Smith (born April 1, 1992) is a Canadian former trampoline gymnast. She is the 2019 Pan American Games individual champion and 2019 World Championships team and synchro bronze medalist. She represented Canada at the 2020 Summer Olympics and competed at every World Championships from 2010 to 2019.

== Gymnastics career ==
Smith began practicing artistic gymnastics at the age of three and switched to the trampoline discipline when she was 14. She made her international debut at the 2009 World Age Group Competition and won a gold medal in synchro and a bronze medal individually in the 17-18 age group.

At the 2010 Pan American Championships, Smith won the silver medal in the individual event and a gold medal in synchro with partner Samantha Sendel. She won a bronze medal in the team event, alongside Karen Cockburn and Rosie MacLennan at the 2011 World Championships. She was an alternate for Canada's 2012 Olympic team.

Smith, Sendel, and MacLennan won a silver medal in the team event at the 2013 World Championships. At the 2014 Pan American Championships, she helped Canada win the gold medal in the team event. She competed in the synchro competition with MacLennan at the 2014 World Championships, and they won the silver medal. She also advanced into the individual final and finished eighth. She was not selected for the 2016 Olympic team.

Smith won the individual title at the 2019 Pan American Games. She then won a bronze medal in the synchro event at the 2019 Vallodolid World Cup alongside Rachel Tam. At the 2019 Trampoline World Championships held in Tokyo, Japan, she won, alongside Sophiane Méthot, Sarah Milette and Rosie MacLennan, the bronze medal in the team event. Smith and Tam also won a bronze medal in the synchro competition. She also qualified for the individual final and finished seventh.

Smith won the individual bronze medal at the 2020 Baku World Cup, behind Chinese gymnasts Zhu Xueying and Liu Lingling. She was selected to represented Canada at the 2020 Summer Olympics. She finished 14th in the individual qualifications after major errors in her second routine and did not advance into the final.

Smith finished fifth in the individual final at the 2022 Coimbra World Cup. She won a gold medal in the team event at the 2023 Pan American Championships. She announced her retirement from the sport in September 2023.

== Personal life ==
Smith graduated from the University of British Columbia with a bachelor's degree in human kinetics in 2015. She also completed a master's degree in physical therapy from the same university in 2018. She is Jewish.

== See also ==
- List of Jews in sports
