= 2008 Continental Championships =

2008 Continental Championships may refer to:

== African Championships ==
- Athletics: 2008 African Championships in Athletics

== Asian Championships ==
- Football (soccer): 2008 AFC Women's Asian Cup
- Football (soccer): 2008 AFC Champions League
- Multisport: 2008 Asian Beach Games
- Weightlifting: 2008 Asian Weightlifting Championships

== European Championships ==
- Figure skating: 2008 European Figure Skating Championships
- Football (soccer): 2007–08 UEFA Champions League
- Football (soccer): 2007–08 UEFA Cup
- Football (soccer): UEFA Euro 2008
- Football (soccer): 2008 UEFA European Under-17 Championship
- Football (soccer): 2007–08 UEFA Women's Cup
- 2008 European Rowing Championships
- Volleyball: 2007–08 CEV Champions League
- Volleyball: 2007–08 CEV Women's Champions League
- 2008 European Karate Championships

== Oceanian Championships ==
- Football (soccer): 2007–08 OFC Champions League
- Swimming: 2008 Oceania Swimming Championships

== Pan American Championships / North American Championships ==
- Football (soccer): 2008 Caribbean Cup
- Football (soccer): 2008 CONCACAF Champions' Cup
- Gymnastics (artistic): 2008 Pan American Individual Event Artistic Gymnastics Championships
- Gymnastics (trampoline and tumbling): 2008 Pan American Trampoline and Tumbling Championships

== South American Championships ==
- Football (soccer): 2008 Copa Libertadores
- Football (soccer): 2008 Copa Sudamericana
- Football (soccer): 2008 Recopa Sudamericana

== See also ==
- 2008 World Championships (disambiguation)
- 2008 World Junior Championships (disambiguation)
- 2008 World Cup (disambiguation)
- Continental championship (disambiguation)
