= Keegan Soehn =

Canadian trampoline gymnast

- Born: August 21, 1992 (age 34) Red Deer, Alberta
- Height: 5 ft 7 in (170 cm)

Gymnastics career
- Discipline: Trampoline gymnastics
- Country represented: Canada (9)
- Club: Thunder Country Trampoline
- Head coach: Ken Soehn
- Assistant coach: Karen Soehn
Medal record
Men's trampoline gymnastics
Representing Canada
World Championships
Gold medal – first place	2011 Birmingham	Double Mini Team
Silver medal – second place	2013 Sofia	Double Mini Team
Pan American Games
Gold medal – first place	2011 Guadalajara	Individual
Gold medal – first place	2015 Toronto	Individual
Silver medal – second place	2023 Santiago	Synchro
Pan American Championships
Gold medal – first place	2018 Lima	Team
Gold medal – first place	2014 Mississauga	Team
Gold medal – first place	2012 Querétaro	Synchro
Gold medal – first place	2012 Querétaro	Double Mini Team
Gold medal – first place	2010 Daytona Beach	Double Mini Team
Silver medal – second place	2014 Mississauga	Individual
Silver medal – second place	2014 Mississauga	Double Mini Team
Silver medal – second place	2010 Daytona Beach	Synchro
Silver medal – second place	2018 Lima	Synchro
Bronze medal – third place	2014 Mississauga	Double Mini
Bronze medal – third place	2010 Daytona Beach	Double Mini
Pacific Rim Championships
Silver medal – second place	2014 Richmond	Team

Keegan Soehn (born August 21, 1992, in Red Deer, Alberta) is a Canadian trampoline gymnast. Soehn was expelled from gymnastics on June 1, 2026 after being sanctioned by Sport Integrity Canada for Physical Maltreatment, Sexual Maltreatment, Grooming and Boundary Transgressions. He won the gold medal in the individual event at the 2011 Pan American Games. He won the 2015 Pan American Games in Toronto becoming the first male to win back to back medals in the Trampoline event. He has Taken part in the 2012 and 2016 Olympic Games held in London and Rio de Janeiro respectively. He has been ranked among the top trampolinists in the world along with Jason Burnett.) In 2022, he was selected in the Canadian team in the 2022 Pan American Gymnastics Championships. He took silver in the synchronised trampoline together with Nathan Shuh and silver medal in individual trampoline.
