= 2013 South American Trampoline Championships =

The 2013 South American Trampoline Championships were held in Bogotá, Colombia, December 10–15, 2013. The competition was organized by the Colombian Gymnastics Federation and approved by the International Gymnastics Federation.

== Medalists ==
Event	Gold	Silver	Bronze
Men's synchronized trampoline	Carlos Ramirez Pala (BRA); Rafael Andrade (BRA)	Lucas Adorno (ARG); Federico Cury (ARG)	Ángel Hernández (COL); Juan Carlos Valcarcel (COL)
Women's synchronized trampoline	Camilla Gomes (BRA); Marcela Martins (BRA)	Mara Colombo (ARG); Marianela Galli (ARG)	Niny Bulla (COL); Luisa Mercado (COL)
Men's trampoline team	Argentina; Lucas Adorno; Bernardo Aquino; Federico Cury	Colombia; Ángel Hernández; Edwin Quintero; Juan Carlos Valcarcel	Brazil; Rafael Andrade; Carlos Ramirez Pala; Bruno Martini; Bernardo de Jesus
Women's trampoline team	Brazil; Camilla Gomes; Joana Perez; Marcela Martins	Colombia; Katish Hernandez; Luisa Mercado; Niny Bulla	Argentina; Mara Colombo; Marianela Galli; Ludmila Skovich; Julieta Espeche
Men's individual trampoline	Ángel Hernández (COL)	Rafael Andrade (BRA)	Bruno Martini (BRA)
Women's individual trampoline	Mara Colombo (ARG)	Marcela Martins (BRA)	Ludmila Skovich (ARG)
