= Amelia Hundley =

American artistic gymnast (born 1998)

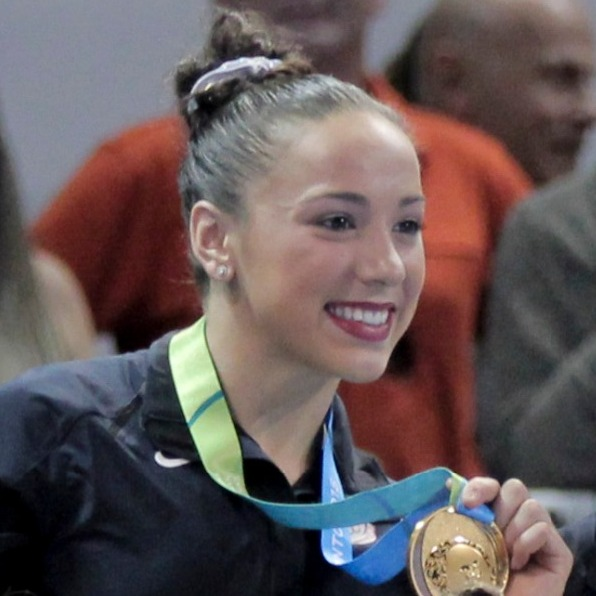
- Hundley at the 2015 Pan American Games

Personal information
- Full name: Amelia Magdalena Hundley
- Nickname: Meels
- Born: January 21, 1998 (age 28) Hamilton, Ohio, U.S.
- Height: 5 ft 5 in (165 cm)

Gymnastics career
- Discipline: Women's artistic gymnastics
- Country represented: United States (2011–2016 (USA))
- College team: Florida Gators
- Gym: Cincinnati Gymnastics Academy
- Head coach: Mary Lee Tracy
- Assistant coach: Amy Wurth
- Choreographer: Dominic Zito
- Retired: April 3, 2019
Medal record
Representing United States
Pacific Rim Championships
Gold medal – first place	2012 Seattle	Team
Pan American Games
Gold medal – first place	2015 Toronto	Team
Silver medal – second place	2015 Toronto	Floor Exercise
Bronze medal – third place	2015 Toronto	Uneven Bars
Pan American Championships
Gold medal – first place	2014 Mississauga	Team
FIG World Cup
Event / 1st / 2nd / 3rd; All-Around World Cup / 0 / 0 / 1

Amelia Magdalena Hundley (born January 21, 1998) is a former American artistic gymnast. She won a gold, silver, and bronze medal at the 2015 Pan American Games in Toronto, Ontario, Canada. She also won team gold medals competing for the United States at the 2012 Pacific Rim Gymnastics Championships and the City of Jesolo Trophy.

Hundley ended her elite gymnastics career at the 2016 Olympic gymnastics Trials in San Jose, California. She attended the University of Florida on a full athletic scholarship where she competed for the Florida Gators gymnastics team in the NCAA.

Hundley trained at the Cincinnati Gymnastics Academy under coaches Mary Lee Tracy and Amy Wert, and fitness trainer Betsy McNally, before joining the Florida Gators gymnastics team in the Fall of 2016.

== Early life ==
Born January 21, 1998, in Hamilton, Ohio, Hundley started tumbling at the age of four in the dance studio run by her mother, a professional tumbler. She proceeded into gymnastics and by age seven was competing in the level-5 (the second level of USAG competition) 2005 Gatlin Classic. In 2006, she won the all-around, balance beam and floor exercise titles at the Fiesta Bowl Invitational. By 2007, Hundley had advanced to compete as a level-7 gymnast, and in 2008 advanced again to compete as a level-10 gymnast.

== Junior career ==
Hundley, as a junior international elite gymnast from Cincinnati Gymnastics Academy (CGA) in Ohio, participated in the gold medal-winning United States team at the 2012 Pacific Rim Gymnastics Championships. In June 2012 she competed in the VISA Championships, also known as the USA Gymnastics National Championships, improving her AA score from 56.750 to 57.250. In March 2013, Hundley participated with the United States national squad in its group performance in the City of Jesolo Trophy, in Jesolo, Italy.

== Senior career ==
Hundley's senior debut came at the Secret U.S. Classic in August 2014, where she placed 6th AA, advancing to Nationals.

At the 2014 P&G Gymnastics Championships, Hundley placed sixth in the all-around, seventh on the balance beam and floor, and eighth on the uneven bars. She was named to the national team and the Pan American Championships team. At the Pan American Championships, she won a gold medal in the team competition.

At the Pan American Games in Toronto (July 11–15, 2015), she was part of the US team that won gold convincingly. She also won silver on the floor exercise, with a score of 14.200. On the uneven bars, she was the lead-off competitor with a score of 14.650, winning bronze. Her teammate Rachel Gowey won gold with a score of 14.725. Hundley also placed fourth in the all-around at the Pan-Am Games.

Hundley competed on the first night of the P&G National Gymnastics Championships. She slightly tore her meniscus on her first tumbling pass on floor, her first event. She continued the first night of competition. At the end of night one, she was in 9th place. She withdrew for night two due to the injury she sustained on floor exercise. Despite her injury, she was named to the Senior National Team and is invited to the 2015 Worlds Selection Camp in September.

On November 11, 2015, she signed the National Letter of Intent to the University of Florida. On February 29, 2016, USA Gymnastics revealed that Hundley would represent the United States at the 2016 Stuttgart World Cup on March 19.

In March 2016, it was announced that Hundley would replace the injured Nia Dennis at the 2016 Stuttgart World Cup in Stuttgart, Germany. This event concluded the C III FIG World Cup Series and competitors were vying for the All-Around title. Hundley had strong performances on every event except uneven bars, where she faltered slightly, scoring a 13.266. However, due to her three other strong events, Hundley placed 3rd All-Around, winning the bronze medal with a score of 56.499.
