= 2006 Pan American Trampoline and Tumbling Championships =

International sports competition

The 2006 Pan American Trampoline and Tumbling Championships were held in Monterrey, Mexico, August 18–19, 2006.

== Medalists ==
Event	Gold	Silver	Bronze
Men
Individual trampoline	Jason Burnett (CAN)	Chris Estrada (USA)	Ryan Weston (USA)
Trampoline team	United States; Chris Estrada; Ryan Weston	Canada; Jason Burnett; Martin Myers	Brazil; Rafael Andrade; Rodrigo Lima
Women
Individual trampoline	Karen Cockburn (CAN)	Brittany Dircks (USA)	Rosannagh MacLennan (CAN)
Trampoline team	Canada; Karen Cockburn; Rosannagh MacLennan	United States; Brittany Dircks; Amanda Bailey	Mexico; Maria Fernanda Reynaud; Viviana Ramirez
Junior
Boys' individual trampoline	Philip Barbaro (CAN)	Philip Devine (USA)	Kyle Soehn (CAN)
Girls' individual trampoline	Nani Vercruyssen (USA)	Kailey McLeod (CAN)	Dakota Earnest (USA)

== Medal table ==
Rank	Nation	Gold	Silver	Bronze	Total
1	Canada (CAN)	4	2	2	8
2	United States (USA)	2	4	2	8
3	Brazil (BRA)	0	0	1	1
3	Mexico (MEX)	0	0	1	1
Totals (4 entries)		6	6	6	18
