= Gymnastics at the 2011 Pan American Games – Women's trampoline =

Women's trampoline at the 2011 Pan American Games
- Venue: Nissan Gymnastics Stadium
- Dates: October 17–18
- Competitors: 8 from 5 nations

Medalists
Gold medal	Rosannagh MacLennan	Canada
Silver medal	Dakota Earnest	United States
Bronze medal	Alaina Williams	United States

The women's trampoline competition of the trampoline events at the 2011 Pan American Games was held between October 17–18 at the Nissan Gymnastics Stadium. The draw for the competition took place on August 1, 2011, in Guadalajara. The defending Pan American Games champion was Karen Cockburn of Canada.

== Schedule ==
All times are Central Standard Time (UTC-6).

Date	Time	Round
October 17, 2011	17:20	Qualification
October 18, 2011	17:15	Final

== Results ==
=== Qualification ===
Rank	Athlete	Nationality	Total	Notes
1	Karen Cockburn	Canada	102.390	Q
2	Rosannagh MacLennan	Canada	101.195	Q
3	Dakota Earnest	United States	95.850	Q
4	Giovanna Matheus	Brazil	95.565	Q
5	Alaina Williams	United States	92.885	Q
6	Daienne Lima	Brazil	90.990	Q
7	Yunairi Soccarras	Cuba	85.715	Q
8	Gemma Zamudio	Mexico	57.310	Q

=== Final ===
Rank	Athlete	Nationality	Total	Notes
1st place, gold medalist(s)	Rosannagh MacLennan	Canada	53.975	Q
2nd place, silver medalist(s)	Dakota Earnest	United States	51.060	Q
3rd place, bronze medalist(s)	Alaina Williams	United States	48.380	
4	Gemma Zamudio	Mexico	27.775	
5	Giovanna Matheus	Brazil	21.115	
6	Daienne Lima	Brazil	15.250	
7	Yunairi Soccarras	Cuba	9.835	
–	Karen Cockburn	Canada	–	DNS
