= 2012 Pan American Trampoline and Tumbling Championships =

International sports competition

The 2012 Pan American Trampoline and Tumbling Championships were held in Santiago de Querétaro, Mexico, November 28–December 3, 2012. The competition was organized by the Mexican Gymnastics Federation, and approved by the International Gymnastics Federation.

== Medalists ==
Event	Gold	Silver	Bronze
Men
Individual trampoline	Kyle Soehn (CAN)	Jose Alberto Vargas (MEX)	Cesar Prieto (MEX)
Synchronized trampoline	Kyle Soehn (CAN); Keegan Soehn (CAN)	Rafael Andrade (BRA); Carlos Ramirez Pala (BRA)	Juan Carlos Valcarcel (COL); Carlos Paez (COL)
Trampoline team	Brazil; Bernardo de Jesus; Rafael Andrade; Carlos Ramirez Pala; Bruno Martini	Colombia; Wilson Aranda; Carlos Paez; Juan Carlos Valcarcel	Mexico; Cesar Prieto; Oswaldo Prieto; Jose Alberto Vargas
Double mini	Denis Vachon (CAN)	Lucas Adorno (ARG)	Ryan Sheehan (CAN)
Double mini team	Canada; Denis Vachon; Ryan Sheehan; Keegan Soehn	Brazil; Bernardo de Jesus; Edmon Abreu; Ramon Abreu; Bruno Martini	Argentina; Lucas Adorno; Bernardo Aquino; Mauro Afranilie
Tumbling	Kalon Ludvigson (USA)	Junior Charpentier-Leclerc (CAN)	Austin Nacey (USA)
Women
Individual trampoline	Samantha Sendel (CAN)	Samantha Smith (CAN)	Camilla Gomes (BRA)
Synchronized trampoline	Camilla Gomes (BRA); Marcela Sobral (BRA)	Samantha Sendel (CAN); Samantha Smith (CAN)	Marianela Galli (ARG); Mara Colombo (ARG)
Trampoline team	Brazil; Carolina Aladim; Joana Perez; Camilla Gomes	Canada; Samantha Smith; Samantha Sendel; Anita Cirillo	Argentina; Romina Solis; Marianela Galli; Mara Colombo
Double mini	Corissa Boychuk (CAN)	Kristie Lowell (USA)	Carolina Aladim (BRA)
Double mini team	Canada; Corissa Boychuk; Gillian Bruce; Pamela Kriangkum	Brazil; Andressa Sandes; Carolina Aladim; Mariana Aquino	Argentina; Marianela Galli; Carolina Diaz; Mara Colombo
Tumbling	Marina Moskalenko (USA)	Paula Esboriol (BRA)	Mabel Barreiros (BRA)
