= Isadora Silva =

Brazilian rhythmic gymnast

Isadora Magalhaes Silva
- Born: 15 October 1997 (age 28)

Gymnastics career
- Discipline: Rhythmic gymnastics
- Country represented: Brazil (2014)
- Head coach: Camila Ferezin
Medal record
Pan American Championships
Gold medal – first place	2014 Mississauga	Group all-around
Gold medal – first place	2014 Mississauga	10 clubs
Gold medal – first place	2014 Mississauga	3 balls + 2 ribbons

Isadora Magalhaes Silva (born 15 October 1997) is a Brazilian group rhythmic gymnast. She represents her nation at international competitions. She competed at world championships, including at the 2014 World Rhythmic Gymnastics Championships.
