= 2008 World Junior Championships =

2008 World Junior Championships may refer to:

- Athletics: 2008 World Junior Championships in Athletics
- Figure skating: 2008 World Junior Figure Skating Championships
- Ice hockey: 2008 World Junior Ice Hockey Championships
- Motorcycle speedway:
  - 2008 Individual Speedway Junior World Championship
  - 2008 Team Speedway Junior World Championship

== See also ==
- 2008 World Cup (disambiguation)
- 2008 Continental Championships (disambiguation)
- 2008 World Championships (disambiguation)
