= David Ross (trampolinist) =

Canadian trampolining coach and manufacturer

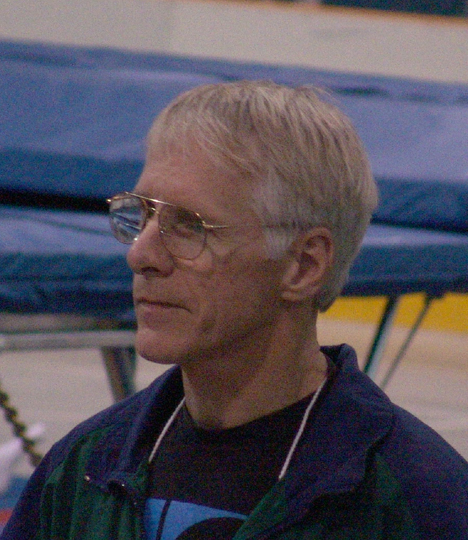
David Ross

David Ross (born April 30, 1950) is a Canadian trampolining coach and manufacturer of trampolines and trampoline equipment. Ross is arguably the person most responsible for Canadian trampolinists becoming competitive on the international scene.

As a physics student at Queen's University, Canada, David Ross developed an interested in competitive trampolining. He finished 2nd in his first Canadian National Trampoline Championship in 1972. He also became interested in manufacturing high performance trampolines and spent years in researching the design and construction of woven trampoline beds and has his own business Rebound Products Inc. Ross hand-woven trampoline beds are now used in many competitions around the world. He has also produced custom trampolines and other rebound equipment for Cirque du Soleil and similar shows.

He opened Skyriders Trampoline Place, the first custom built Canadian trampolining facility, in 1990. It is located in Richmond Hill, north of Toronto, Ontario. Many Canadian National Team athletes train there.

Ross has been the Canadian National Team coach for a number of years. He has coached four of the five Canadian Olympic trampolinists at Skyriders, Karen Cockburn, Mathieu Turgeon and Rosannagh MacLennan and Jason Burnett. His coaching style focuses on increasing the technical difficulty of the optional routine. Athletes (Burnett, Cockburn and MacLennan) coached by Ross hold the FIG world records for highest difficulty in the Men's Individual and Women's Synchronized trampoline events.
