= 2008 World Championships =

2008 World Championships may refer to:

- Athletics: 2008 IAAF World Indoor Championships
  - Cross-country running: 2008 IAAF World Cross Country Championships
  - Half marathon: 2008 IAAF World Half Marathon Championships
- Bowls: World Bowls Championships 2008
- Chess: World Chess Championship 2008
- Curling:
  - 2008 Ford World Men's Curling Championship
  - 2008 World Women's Curling Championship
- Darts: 2008 BDO World Darts Championship
- Darts: 2008 PDC World Darts Championship
- Figure skating: 2008 World Figure Skating Championships
- Ice hockey: 2008 Men's World Ice Hockey Championships
- Ice hockey: 2008 Women's World Ice Hockey Championships
- Snooker: 2008 World Snooker Championship
- Speed skating:
  - Allround: 2008 World Allround Speed Skating Championships
  - Sprint: 2008 World Sprint Speed Skating Championships
  - Single distances: 2008 World Single Distance Speed Skating Championships

== See also ==
- 2008 World Cup (disambiguation)
- 2008 Continental Championships (disambiguation)
- 2008 World Junior Championships (disambiguation)
