= 2008 World Cup =

2008 World Cup may refer to:

- 2008 Alpine Skiing World Cup
- 2008 VIVA World Cup
- 2008 World Cup (men's golf)
- 2008 FIFA Beach Soccer World Cup
- 2008 FIFA Club World Cup
- 2008 FIFA Futsal World Cup
- Speedway World Cup 2008
- Rugby League:
  - 2008 Rugby League World Cup, men's tournament
  - 2008 Women's Rugby League World Cup
  - 2008 Festival of World Cups, several competitions including university, police, defence forces and wheelchair world cups
- 2008 World Cup of Pool

== See also ==
- 2008 Continental Championships (disambiguation)
- 2008 World Championships (disambiguation)
- 2008 World Junior Championships (disambiguation)
- 2008 Australian Football International Cup
