= Alaina Williams =

American trampoline gymnast

Medal record

Women's trampoline gymnastics

Representing the United States

Pan American Games
Bronze medal – third place	2011 Guadalajara	Individual

Pan American Championships
Gold medal – first place	2008 Buenos Aires	Team
Bronze medal – third place	2008 Buenos Aires	Synchro

Pacific Rim Championships
Silver medal – second place	2012 Everett	Synchro
Bronze medal – third place	2012 Everett	Team

Alaina Williams (born January 30, 1990) is an American trampoline gymnast.

== Early life and education ==
Williams was born in Amarillo, Texas, and attended Amarillo High School. She is currently attending The University of Oklahoma.

== Career ==
Williams won the 2010 United States championship and earned a bronze medal at the 2011 Pan American Games.

== Personal life ==
Williams is married to gymnast Steven Legendre.
