= 2014 Pan American Gymnastics Championships =

International sports competition

The 2014 Pan American Gymnastics Championships were held in Mississauga, Ontario, Canada, August 20–September 1, 2014. The competition was organized by the Canadian Gymnastics Federation and approved by the International Gymnastics Federation.

== Medallists ==
=== Artistic gymnastics ===
Event	Gold	Silver	Bronze
Men
Team all-around	United States; Sean Melton; Christopher Maestas; Marvin Kimble; Jonathan Horton; Brandon Wynn; Eddie Penev	Colombia; Jossimar Calvo; Jorge Giraldo; Jhonny Munoz; Carlos Calvo; Javier Sandoval; Jorge Pena Castiblanco	Brazil; Lucas Bitencourt; Sérgio Sasaki; Caio Souza; Diego Hypólito; Francisco Barreto Júnior; Arthur Zanetti
Individual all-around	Jossimar Calvo (COL)	Manrique Larduet (CUB)	Sean Melton (USA)
Floor	Tomás González (CHI)	Diego Hypólito (BRA)	Arthur Zanetti (BRA)
Pommel horse	Daniel Corral (MEX)	Marvin Kimble (USA)	Alexander Rodriguez (PUR)
Rings	Arthur Zanetti (BRA)	Brandon Wynn (USA)	Juan Raffo (CHI)
Vault	Sérgio Sasaki (BRA)	Jorge Vega (GUA)	Caio Souza (BRA)
Parallel bars	Jorge Giraldo (COL)	Manrique Larduet (CUB)	Caio Souza (BRA)
Horizontal bar	Jossimar Calvo (COL)	Sérgio Sasaki (BRA) Manrique Larduet (CUB)	
Women
Team all-around	United States; MyKayla Skinner; Maggie Nichols; Madison Desch; Amelia Hundley; Madison Kocian; Ashton Locklear	Brazil; Julie Sinmon; Letícia Costa; Daniele Hypólito; Isabelle Cruz; Mariana Oliveira; Maria Cecília Cruz	Mexico; Alexa Moreno; Elsa García; Karla Torres; Karla Retiz; Ahtziri Sandoval; Miriana Almeida
Individual all-around	MyKayla Skinner (USA)	Jessica López (VEN)	Maggie Nichols (USA)
Vault	MyKayla Skinner (USA)	Yesenia Ferrera (CUB)	Dovélis Torres (CUB)
Uneven bars	Ashton Locklear (USA)	Madison Kocian (USA)	Ahtziri Sandoval (MEX)
Balance beam	Ana Sofía Gómez (GUA)	Jessica López (VEN)	Julie Sinmon (BRA)
Floor	MyKayla Skinner (USA)	Jessica López (VEN)	Yesenia Ferrera (CUB)

=== Rhythmic gymnastics ===
Event	Gold	Silver	Bronze
Team all-around	United States; Jasmine Kerber; Rebecca Sereda; Serena Lu; Aliya Protto	Brazil; Angélica Kvieczynski; Natália Gaudio; Andressa Jardim; Emanuelle Lima	Mexico; Cynthia Valdez; Rut Castillo; Karla Diaz; Cindy Gallegos
Individual all-around	Jasmine Kerber (USA)	Rebecca Sereda (USA)	Angélica Kvieczynski (BRA)
Group all-around	Brazil; Beatriz Francisco; Eliane Sampaio; Francielly Pereira; Gabrielle Silva; Isadora Silva; Mayra Gmach	United States; Jennifer Rokhman; Monica Rokhman; Alisa Kano; Kiana Eide; Natalie McGiffert; Kristen Shaldybin	Mexico; Marialicia Ortega; Maria Eugenia Nava; Nely Gonzalez; Diana Casillas; Alondra Rodriguez; Erendeni Nava
Ball	Patricia Bezzoubenko (CAN)	Jasmine Kerber (USA)	Angélica Kvieczynski (BRA)
Clubs	Jasmine Kerber (USA)	Patricia Bezzoubenko (CAN)	Angélica Kvieczynski (BRA)
Hoop	Patricia Bezzoubenko (CAN)	Angélica Kvieczynski (BRA)	Jasmine Kerber (USA)
Ribbon	Jasmine Kerber (USA)	Cynthia Valdez (MEX)	Angélica Kvieczynski (BRA)
Group 10 clubs	Brazil; Beatriz Francisco; Eliane Sampaio; Francielly Pereira; Gabrielle Silva; Isadora Silva; Mayra Gmach	United States; Jennifer Rokhman; Monica Rokhman; Alisa Kano; Kiana Eide; Natalie McGiffert; Kristen Shaldybin	Canada; Katrina Cameron; Maya Kojevnikov; Teija Korjus-Parker; Lucinda Nowell; Anjelika Reznik; Victoria Reznik
Group 3 balls / 2 ribbons	Brazil; Beatriz Francisco; Eliane Sampaio; Francielly Pereira; Gabrielle Silva; Isadora Silva; Mayra Gmach	Canada; Katrina Cameron; Maya Kojevnikov; Teija Korjus-Parker; Lucinda Nowell; Anjelika Reznik; Victoria Reznik	Mexico; Marialicia Ortega; Maria Eugenia Nava; Nely Gonzalez; Diana Casillas; Alondra Rodriguez; Erendeni Nava

=== Trampoline gymnastics ===
Event	Gold	Silver	Bronze
Men
Individual trampoline	Jason Burnett (CAN)	Keegan Soehn (CAN)	Logan Dooley (USA)
Synchronized trampoline	Logan Dooley (USA); Steven Gluckstein (USA)	Jeffrey Gluckstein (USA); Aliaksei Shostak (USA)	Rafael Andrade (BRA); Carlos Ramirez Pala (BRA)
Trampoline team	Canada; Keegan Soehn; Kyle Soehn; Jason Burnett; Sebastien St-Germain	United States; Steven Gluckstein; Jeffrey Gluckstein; Logan Dooley; Neil Gulati	Brazil; Carlos Ramirez Pala; Bruno Martini; Rafael Andrade; Breno Souza
Double mini	Alexander Renkert (USA)	Jon Schwaiger (CAN)	Keegan Soehn (CAN)
Double mini team	Brazil; Bruno Martini; Mario Santana; Breno Souza	Canada; Jon Schwaiger; Keegan Soehn; Douglas Armstrong; Ryan Sheehan	United States; Alexander Renkert; Casey Chandler; Austin White; Steward Pritchard
Tumbling	Austin Nacey (USA)	Michael Chaves (CAN)	Trevor Jackson (USA)
Tumbling team	United States; Trevor Jackson; Alexander Renkert; Austin Nacey; Jerrett Jensen	Canada; David Findlay; Michael Chaves; Vincent Lavoie; Junior Charpentier-Leclerc	—N/a
Women
Individual trampoline	Rosannagh Maclennan (CAN)	Samantha Sendel (CAN)	Camilla Gomes (BRA)
Synchronized trampoline	Rosannagh Maclennan (CAN); Samantha Sendel (CAN)	Camilla Gomes (BRA); Joana Conde Perez (BRA)	Charlotte Drury (USA); Shaylee Dunavin (USA)
Trampoline team	Canada; Rosannagh MacLennan; Samantha Sendel; Karen Cockburn; Samantha Smith	Mexico; Dafne Navarro; Alejandra Fernandez; Samantha Zamudio; Andrea Pinzan	Argentina; Mara Colombo; Julieta Espeche; Marianela Galli; Ludmila Skovich
Double mini	Erin Jauch (USA)	Tristan van Natta (USA)	Mara Colombo (ARG)
Double mini team	United States; Erin Jauch; Tristan van Natta; Kristle Lowell; Breanne Millard	Canada; Carine Dufour; Tiana Hesmert; Arden Oh	Argentina; Mara Colombo; Julieta Espeche; Marianela Galli
Tumbling	Jordan Sugrim (CAN)	Yuliya Stankevich-Brown (USA)	Erin Templeton (CAN)

== Medal table ==
Rank	Nation	Gold	Silver	Bronze	Total
1	United States (USA)	16	11	7	34
2	Canada (CAN)	8	9	3	20
3	Brazil (BRA)	6	6	12	24
4	Colombia (COL)	3	1	0	4
5	Mexico (MEX)	1	2	5	8
6	Guatemala (GUA)	1	1	0	2
7	Chile (CHI)	1	0	1	2
8	Cuba (CUB)	0	4	2	6
9	Venezuela (VEN)	0	3	0	3
10	Argentina (ARG)	0	0	3	3
11	Puerto Rico (PUR)	0	0	1	1
Totals (11 entries)		36	37	34	107
