= Camilla Gomes =

Brazilian trampoline gymnast

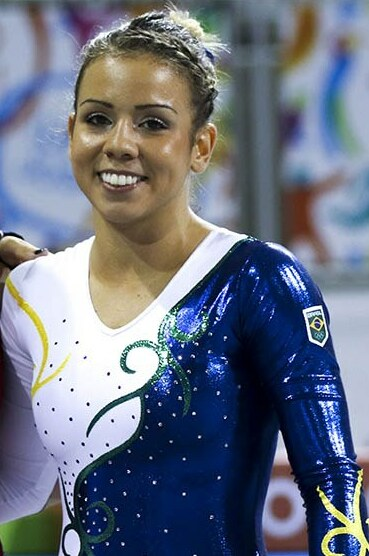
- Gomes at the 2015 Pan American Games

Personal information
- Full name: Camilla Lopes Gomes
- Born: 27 May 1994 (age 32)
- Spouse: Steven Gluckstein

Gymnastics career
- Discipline: Trampoline gymnastics
- Country represented: Brazil (since 2012)
- Club: Elite Trampoline Academy, formerly Nucleo Tatiana Figueiredo
Medal record
Women's trampoline gymnastics
Representing Brazil
FIG World Cup
Silver medal – second place	2023 Santarem	Individual
Gold medal – first place	2023 Baku	Individual
Gold medal – first place	2023 Baku	Synchro
Silver medal – second place	2023 Palm Beach	Synchro
Bronze medal – third place	2023 Coimbra	Individual
Pan American Games
Silver medal – second place	2023 Santiago	Individual
Silver medal – second place	2023 Santiago	Synchro
Pan American Championships
Gold medal – first place	2012 Querétaro	Synchro
Gold medal – first place	2012 Querétaro	Team
Gold medal – first place	2021 Rio de Janeiro	Individual
Gold medal – first place	2022 Rio de Janeiro	Individual
Gold medal – first place	2022 Rio de Janeiro	Synchro
Gold medal – first place	2023 Monterrey	Individual
Silver medal – second place	2014 Mississauga	Synchro
Silver medal – second place	2022 Rio de Janeiro	Team
Silver medal – second place	2023 Monterrey	Synchro
Bronze medal – third place	2012 Querétaro	Individual
Bronze medal – third place	2014 Mississauga	Individual
Bronze medal – third place	2018 Lima	Synchro
Bronze medal – third place	2023 Monterrey	Team
Pan American Sports Festival
Silver medal – second place	2014 Guadalajara	Individual
South American Games
Gold medal – first place	2018 Cochabamba	Individual
Gold medal – first place	2022 Asunción	Individual
South American Championships
Gold medal – first place	2013 Bogotá	Team
Gold medal – first place	2013 Bogotá	Synchro

Camilla Lopes Gomes (born 27 May 1994) is a Brazilian individual and synchronised trampoline gymnast, representing her nation at international competitions.

== Career ==
She has competed at multiple Trampoline World Championships. At the 2018 Trampoline Gymnastics World Championships, with partner Alice Gomes, she finished sixth in synchronized trampoline.

A doping ban following a positive test result for the presence of canrenone in her system after the 2019 Trampoline Gymnastics World Championships in Tokyo sidelined Gomes in 2020 even though she was found to have "no significant fault or negligence," which reduced her period of ineligibility.

In 2022, she finished 7th at the 2022 Trampoline Gymnastics World Championships in synchronized trampoline with partner Alice Gomes.

In 2023, Gomes took silver at the World Cup in Santarem and then became the first Brazilian to win gold at a World Cup event, earning double gold at the FIG World Cup 2023 AGF Trophy event held at Baku in both the individual and synchronized trampoline (with partner Alice Gomes) events. Then at the 2023 Trampoline Gymnastics World Championships, she had her highest individual finish at a world championships when finished in eighth. Following her successes in 2023, she was named as Brazil’s representative to the 2024 Paris Olympics.

== Awards ==
She was named “Trampoline Gymnast of the Year” in Brazil in the following years: 2014, 2015, 2018, and 2021.

== Personal ==
In 2014, Gomes intended to spend three months training in the United States of America with Tatiana Kovaleva. She began a relationship with Steve Gluckstein that eventually resulted in their 2016 marriage. Gomes works as a nutrition consultant and continues to train at Elite Training Academy and the couple resides in Atlantic Highlands, New Jersey.
