= 2012 Pacific Rim Gymnastics Championships =

- Location: Everett, Washington, United States
- Dates: March 16–18, 2012

The 2012 Pacific Rim Championships were held from March 16–18, 2012, at the Comcast Arena and Comcast Community Ice Rink in Everett, Washington.

== Medalists ==
=== Artistic gymnastics ===
==== Men's events ====
Event	Gold	Silver	Bronze
Team	United States	Japan	China
Seniors
All-Around	Chris Brooks (USA)	Sam Mikulak (USA)	Koji Uematsu (JPN)
Floor	Jake Dalton (USA)	Tatsuki Nakashima (JPN)	Cheng Ran (CHN)
Pommel Horse	Rongbing Liu (CHN)	Chris Brooks (USA)	Sam Mikulak (USA)
Rings	Chris Brooks (USA)	Takuya Nakase (JPN)	Joshua Jefferis (AUS)
Vault	Wai Hung Shek (HKG)	Sam Mikulak (USA)	Scott Morgan (CAN)
Parallel Bars	Jorge Giraldo (COL)	Cheng Ran (CHN)	Sam Mikulak (USA)
Horizontal Bar	Chris Brooks (USA)	Sam Mikulak (USA)	Rongbing Liu (CHN)

==== Women's events ====
Event	Gold	Silver	Bronze
Team	United States	China	Canada
Seniors
All-Around	Jordyn Wieber (USA)	Kyla Ross (USA)	Peng-Peng Lee (CAN)
Vault	Wakiko Ryu (JPN)	Wong Hiu Ying Angel (HKG)	Risa Konishi (JPN)
Uneven Bars	Gabby Douglas (USA)	Kyla Ross (USA)	Luo Peiru (CHN)
Balance Beam	Kyla Ross (USA)	Peng-Peng Lee (CAN)	Tan Sixin (CHN)
Floor	Jordyn Wieber (USA)	Peng-Peng Lee (CAN)	Kyla Ross (USA)
Juniors
All-Around	Katelyn Ohashi (USA)	Lexie Priessman (USA)	Sakura Yumoto (JPN)
Vault	Lexie Priessman (USA)	Amelia Hundley (USA)	Maegan Chant (CAN)
Uneven Bars	Katelyn Ohashi (USA)	Victoria-Kayen Woo (CAN)	Sakura Yumoto (JPN)
Balance Beam	Katelyn Ohashi (USA)	Lou Nina (CHN)	Maria Kharenkova (RUS)
Floor	Katelyn Ohashi (USA)	Amelia Hundley (USA)	Maria Kharenkova (RUS)

=== Rhythmic gymnastics ===
Event	Gold	Silver	Bronze
Team	United States	Canada	China
Seniors
All-Around	Julie Zetlin (USA)	Polina Kozitskiy (USA)	Janine Murray (AUS)
Hoop	Polina Kozitskiy (USA)	Janine Murray (AUS)	Yuqing Yang (CHN)
Ball	Julie Zetlin (USA)	Janine Murray (AUS)	Nerissa Mo (CAN)
Clubs	Linyi Peng (CHN)	Polina Kozitskiy (USA)	Veronica Navarro (MEX)
Ribbon	Julie Zetlin (USA)	Alexis Page (USA)	Yuqing Yang (CHN); Janine Murray (AUS)

=== Trampoline gymnastics ===
Event	Gold	Silver	Bronze
Men's Team	Australia: Blake Gaudry; Shaun Swadling; Luke Seal; Blake Rutherford	Russia: Aleksey Ilichev; Michail Melnik; Andrey Yudin	United States: Steven Gluckstein; Neil Gulati; Cody Gesuelli
Women's Team	Canada: Karen Cockburn; Rosie MacLennan; Lexi Giesbrecht	Russia: Galina Goncharenko; Viktoria Voronina; Susana Kockesok; Yana Pavlova	United States: Savannah Vinsant; Alaina Williams; Shaylee Dunavin; Maggie Gallagher
Seniors
Men's Individual	Jason Burnett (CAN)	Steven Gluckstein (AUS)	Aleksey Ilichev (RUS)
Men's Synchro	Australia: Blake Gaudry; Shaun Swadling	Russia: Aleksey Ilichev; Michail Melnik	United States: Steven Gluckstein; Neil Gulati
Women's Individual	Rosie MacLennan (CAN)	Karen Cockburn (CAN)	Alexandra Freeman (AUS)
Women's Synchro	Canada: Rosie MacLennan; Karen Cockburn	United States: Alaina Williams; Savannah Vinsant	Russia: Viktoria Voronina; Galina Goncharenko

== Medal count ==
Rank	Nation	Gold	Silver	Bronze	Total
1	United States	20	13	6	39
2	Canada	4	5	5	14
3	China	2	3	8	13
4	Australia	2	3	4	9
5	Japan	1	3	4	8
6	Hong Kong	1	1	0	2
7	Colombia	1	0	0	1
8	Russia	0	3	4	7
9	Mexico	0	0	1	1
Totals (9 entries)		31	31	32	94
