= Chris Estrada =

American trampoline gymnast

- Full name: Christopher Estrada
- Born: February 14, 1984 (age 42) Hobbs, New Mexico, United States

Gymnastics career
- Discipline: Trampoline gymnastics
- Country represented: United States
Medal record
Men's trampoline gymnastics
Representing the United States
Pan American Games
Gold medal – first place	2007 Rio de Janeiro	Individual
Pan American Championships
Gold medal – first place	2006 Monterrey	Team
Silver medal – second place	2006 Monterrey	Individual
Bronze medal – third place	2004 Tampa	Individual

Chris Estrada (born February 14, 1983) is an American trampoline gymnast who made his Olympic debut at the 2008 Summer Olympics, finishing in fifteenth position in the Men's Individual competition. He now is coaching in his own gym with his sister in South Texas, where he teaches children ages 14 months to 18 years on trampoline and floor tumbling.
