= Bruno Martini (gymnast) =

Brazilian trampoline gymnast

- Full name: Bruno Rosas Martini
- Born: 18 April 1987 (age 39) Barra Mansa, Rio de Janeiro

Gymnastics career
- Discipline: Trampoline gymnastics
- Country represented: Brazil (2008–2014)
Medal record
Men's trampoline gymnastics
Representing Brazil
World Games
Gold medal – first place	2013 Cali	Double mini
World Championships
Gold medal – first place	2011 Birmingham	Double mini
Silver medal – second place	2011 Birmingham	Double mini team
Pan American Championships
Gold medal – first place	2008 Buenos Aires	Double mini team
Gold medal – first place	2008 Buenos Aires	Tumbling team
Gold medal – first place	2010 Daytona Beach	Tumbling
Gold medal – first place	2012 Querétaro	Team
Gold medal – first place	2014 Mississauga	Double mini team
Silver medal – second place	2008 Buenos Aires	Double mini
Silver medal – second place	2008 Buenos Aires	Tumbling
Silver medal – second place	2010 Daytona Beach	Double mini
Silver medal – second place	2010 Daytona Beach	Double mini team
Silver medal – second place	2012 Querétaro	Double mini team
Bronze medal – third place	2014 Mississauga	Team
South American Championships
Bronze medal – third place	2013 Bogotá	Individual
Bronze medal – third place	2013 Bogotá	Team

Bruno Rosas Martini (born 18 April 1987) is a Brazilian double-mini and tumbling trampoline gymnast, representing his nation at international competitions. At the 2008 Pan American Trampoline and Tumbling Championships he won two silver medals, and at the 2010 Pan American Trampoline and Tumbling Championships, a gold and a silver medal. He competed at world championships, including at the 2009, 2011 and 2013 Trampoline World Championships, winning the silver medal in 2011 in the double-mini team event. At the 2013 World Games he won the gold medal in the individual event.
