= Jeffrey Gluckstein =

American trampoline gymnast

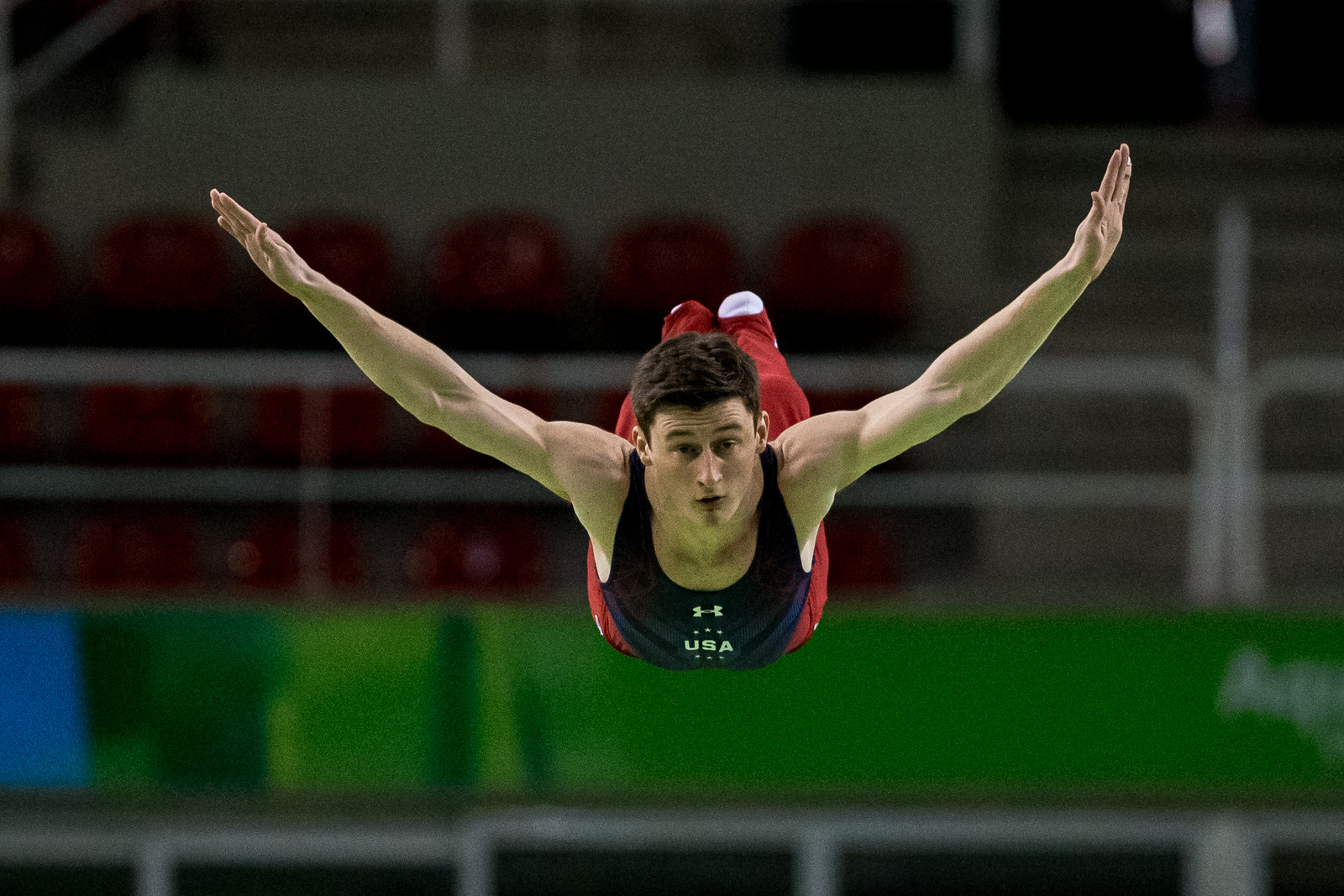
- Gluckstein competing at the 2016 Gymnastics Olympic Test Event

Personal information
- Born: February 25, 1993 (age 33)

Gymnastics career
- Discipline: Trampoline gymnastics
- Country represented: United States
Medal record
Men's trampoline gymnastics
Representing United States
Trampoline World Championships
Silver medal – second place	2019 Tokyo	All-around Team
Pan American Games
Silver medal – second place	2019 Lima	Individual
Pan American Championships
Gold medal – first place	2018 Lima	Individual
Silver medal – second place	2014 Mississauga	Synchro
Silver medal – second place	2014 Mississauga	Team
Silver medal – second place	2018 Lima	Team

Jeffrey Gluckstein (born February 25, 1993) is an American trampoline gymnast. He won the silver medal in the men's individual event at the 2019 Pan American Games held in Lima, Peru.

== Personal life ==
His older brother Steven Gluckstein is a former trampoline gymnast.

Raised in Atlantic Highlands, New Jersey, he attended Henry Hudson Regional High School.
