= Joana di Carlo Conde Perez =

Brazilian trampoline gymnast

Joana Di Carlo Conde Perez
- Born: 21 August 1990 (age 36)

Gymnastics career
- Discipline: Trampoline gymnastics
- Country represented: Brazil (2010(?)-)
Medal record
Women's trampoline gymnastics
Representing Brazil
Pan American Championships
Gold medal – first place	2012 Querétaro	Team
Silver medal – second place	2014 Mississauga	Synchro
Silver medal – second place	2010 Daytona Beach	Team
Bronze medal – third place	2010 Daytona Beach	Individual
Bronze medal – third place	2008 Buenos Aires	Team

Joana Di Carlo Conde Perez (born 21 August 1990) is a Brazilian individual trampolinist, representing her nation at international competitions. She competed at world championships, including at the 2010, 2013 and 2014 Trampoline World Championships.
