= 2008 Pan American Trampoline and Tumbling Championships =

International sports competition

The 2008 Pan American Trampoline and Tumbling Championships were held in Buenos Aires, Argentina, December 4–7, 2008.

== Medalists ==
| Event | Gold | Silver | Bronze |
|---|---|---|---|
Men
| Individual trampoline | Jason Burnett (CAN) | Michael Devine (USA) | Logan Dooley (USA) |
| Synchronized trampoline | Logan Dooley (USA); Steven Gluckstein (USA) | Martin Myers (CAN); Carl Rom-Colthoff (CAN) | Rodrigo Lima (BRA); Thiago Cardoso (BRA) |
| Trampoline team | Canada; Carl Rom-Colthoff; David Sabourin; Jason Burnett; Martin Myers | Brazil; Carlos Ramirez Pala; Rodrigo Lima; Thiago Cardoso; Rafael Andrade | Argentina; Dario Arias; Facundo Crescini; Juan Ignacio Posse Lema; Santiago Villareal |
| Double mini | Kalon Ludvigson (USA) | Bruno Martini (BRA) | Alexander Seifert (CAN) |
| Double mini team | Brazil; Bruno Martini; Bernardo de Jesus; Neivaldo Neves; Arthur Iotte | Canada; Alexander Seifert; Colton Kent; Luke Friesen | Argentina; Facundo Vallejo; Matias Bazan; Santiago Villareal; Mariano Rodriguez |
| Tumbling | Kalon Ludvigson (USA) | Bruno Martini (BRA) | Alexander Seifert (CAN) |
| Tumbling team | Brazil; Bruno Martini; John Lenon Fernandes; Tiago Romão; Thomas Chaib | Argentina; Andres Aviles; Guillermo Rivadeneira; Santiago Villareal; Nicolas Rivadeneira | None awarded |
Women
| Individual trampoline | Rosannagh MacLennan (CAN) | Nani Vercruyssen (USA) | Samantha Sendel (CAN) |
| Synchronized trampoline | Samantha Sendel (CAN); Rosannagh MacLennan (CAN) | Chelsea Nerpio (CAN); Sophie Leblanc (CAN) | Alaina Hebert (USA); Alaina Williams (USA) |
| Trampoline team | United States; Alaina Hebert; Alaina Williams; Nani Vercruyssen | Argentina; Carolina Diaz; Lucina Bellomo; Melina Wirtz; Soledad Sauad | Brazil; Joana Perez; Renata Teles; Vanessa dos Santos; Virginia Lins |
| Double mini | Julie Warnock (CAN) | Aubree Balkan (USA) | Gillian Bruce (CAN) |
| Double mini team | Canada; Chelsea Nerpio; Gillian Bruce; Julie Warnock | Brazil; Barbara Silva; Samantha de Oliveira; Virginia Lins; Renata Teles | Argentina; Carolina Diaz; Maria Eugenia Perez; Melina Wirtz; Belen Sola |
| Tumbling | Leanne Seitzinger (USA) | Teja Durante (CAN) | Amy McDonald (USA) |
| Tumbling team | Canada; Catherine McNutt; Julie Warnock; Teja Durante | Argentina; Agustina Juri; Jesica Wyse; Melina Sirolli; Jazmin Somma | Brazil; Mabel Barreiros; Thamara dos Santos; Zaira Basilato; Virginia Lins |

== Medal table ==
| Rank | Nation | Gold | Silver | Bronze | Total |
|---|---|---|---|---|---|
| 1 | Canada (CAN) | 7 | 4 | 4 | 15 |
| 2 | United States (USA) | 5 | 3 | 3 | 11 |
| 3 | Brazil (BRA) | 2 | 4 | 3 | 9 |
| 4 | Argentina (ARG) | 0 | 3 | 3 | 6 |
| Totals (4 entries) | | 14 | 14 | 13 | 41 |
