= Kalon Ludvigson =

American trampoline gymnast

Medal record

Men's trampoline gymnastics

Representing the United States

World Championships
Bronze medal – third place	2011 Birmingham	Double Mini Team

Pan American Championships
Gold medal – first place	2012 Querétaro	Tumbling
Gold medal – first place	2008 Buenos Aires	Double Mini
Gold medal – first place	2008 Buenos Aires	Tumbling

Kalon Curtis Ludvigson (born March 15, 1988) is an American trampoline and tumbling champion. Ludvigson has become the most decorated U.S. athlete in trampoline and tumbling history by winning 20 World Cup and World Championships Medals in Tumbling and Double Mini Trampoline.

== Early life ==
Ludvigson was born in Gunnison, Utah, United States to Curtis and Laurie Ludvigson.

== Career ==
Ludvigson was undefeated in the United States from 2006, after winning the U.S. National Championships, until 2013. Kalon set the World Record for Degree of Difficulty in 2008 at the Pan American Championships in Buenos Aires, Argentina.

He won the World Cup in 2009, 2011 and 2012 and set the record at the World Cup in Odense, Denmark in October 2011. In 2015 he still holds the record tied with Yang Song (CHN).

Ludvigson was also a coach. In August 2013, Ludvigson suffered a serious spinal injury during a demonstration for students, which left him paralyzed below the waist. He was hospitalized until December, and a fundraising drive was initiated to help pay for medical and physiotherapy expenses.

An international invitational gymnastic meet in Salt Lake City has been named after him.
