= Dakota Earnest =

American trampoline gymnast (born 1993)

Dakota Earnest (Tauferner)
- Born: November 16, 1993 (age 32) Lubbock, Texas, U.S.
- Spouse: Nate Tauferner

Gymnastics career
- Discipline: Trampoline gymnastics
- Country represented: United States
- Club: Acrospirits
- Head coach: Will Green
- Assistant coach: Sherry Mulkey
Medal record
Women's trampoline gymnastics
Representing the United States
Pan American Games
Silver medal – second place	2011 Guadalajara	Individual
Pan American Sports Festival
Bronze medal – third place	2014 Guadalajara	Individual

Dakota Earnest (Tauferner) (born November 16, 1993) is an American trampoline gymnast. Earnest competed in the Women's Individual Trampoline at the 2011 Pan American Games in Guadalajara and won the silver medal. Earnest was also named as the female trampoline alternate for the United States at the 2012 Summer Olympics.

== London 2012 ==
In 2011, Savannah Vinsant earned a place for the United States in the trampoline competition at the Olympics. The spot would be selected by three trial competitions during the Olympic year. The lowest scoring trial for each athlete would be dropped and the total would determine the athlete to represent the United States. The selection committee would select the alternates following that.

Dakota placed second in the first trial and third in the second and third, including Nationals. Savannah Vinsant would place first during all three, earning her place to represent the United States at the 2012 London Olympics. Dakota placed third in the Olympic trials selection points procedure. The committee selected Dakota as the first alternate. First alternates traveled to London to support their teammates and take their place if necessary.

== Accomplishments ==
=== National ===
- 2013 U.S. Elite Challenge, Frisco, Texas - 2nd-SY; 5th-TR
- 2012 USA Gymnastics Trampoline Championships, San Jose, Calif. - 3rd-TR
- 2012 Stars & Stripes Cup, Cleveland, Ohio - 3rd-TR
- 2012 Elite Challenge, Tulsa, Okla. - 2nd-TR; 3rd-SY
- 2011 U.S. Elite Championships, San Antonio, Texas - 1st-SY; 2nd-TR
- 2011 U.S. Elite Challenge, Fort Worth, Texas - 3rd-TR; 7th-DM
- 2011 Winter Classic, Houston, Texas - 1st-SY; 5th-TR
- 2010 Visa Championships, Hartford, Conn. - 3rd-TR
- 2010 Fairland Classic, Laurel, Md. - 3rd-TR
- 2009 Final Selection Event, Las Vegas, Nev. - 1st-SY; 4th-TR (15–16) (Jr. Div.)
- 2009 Visa Championships, Dallas, Texas - 1st-TR; 6th-SY (Jr. Div.)
- 2009 U.S. Elite Challenge, Ft. Smith, Ark. - 3rd-TR; 5th-SY (Jr. Div.)
- 2009 Winter Classic, Birmingham, Ala. - 7th-TR (Jr. Div.)
- 2008 Stars and Stripes Cup, Colorado Springs, Colo. - 2nd-SY; 3rd-TR (Jr. Div.)
- 2008 Visa Championships, Houston, Texas - 4th-SY; 5th-TR (Jr. Div.)
- 2008 U.S. Elite Challenge, Mobile, Ala. - 1st-TR; 5th-SY (Jr. Div.)
- 2008 Winter Classic, Tulsa, Okla. - 2nd-SY
- 2007 National Championships, Memphis, Tenn. - 1st-TR (Jr. Div.)
- 2007 U.S. Elite Challenge, Colorado Springs, Colo. - 2nd-TR (Jr. Div.)
- 2007 Winter Classic, Lubbock, Texas - 2nd-TR; 3rd-SY (Jr. Div.)
- 2006 U.S. Championships, Schaumburg, Ill. - 4th-TU (Jr. Div.)

=== International ===
- 2012 Taiyuan World Cup, Taiyuan, China - 4th-SY
- 2011 World Championships, Birmingham, England - 4th-TR (Team), SY
- 2011 Pan American Games, Guadalajara, Mexico - 2nd-TR
- 2011 Salzgitter World Cup, Salzgitter, Germany -
- 2011 Canada Cup, Alberta, Canada - 3rd-SY
- 2011 Flower Cup, Aalsmeer, Netherlands - 4th-TR
- 2010 Pan American Cup, Guadalajara, Mexico - 4th-TR
- 2010 World Championships, Metz, France -
- 2010 Frivolten Cup, Herrljunga, Sweden - 4th-TR
- 2010 Pan American Championships, Daytona Beach, Fla. - (Jr. Div.)
- 2009 World Age Group Competition, St. Petersburg, Russia - 4th-TR (15–16)
- 2009 Canada Cup, Okotoks, Alberta, Canada - 1st-SY; 7th-TR (Jr. Div.)
- 2008 Pan American Championships, Buenos Aires, Argentina - 1st-TR (Jr. Div.)
- 2008 Pacific Rim Gymnastics Championships, San Jose, Calif. - 3rd-Team; 6th-TR (Jr. Div.)
- 2006 Pan American Championships, Pan American Championships, Mexico - 3rd-TR (Jr. Div.)
