= Steven Gluckstein =

American trampoline gymnast

- Born: June 24, 1990 (age 36) Red Bank, New Jersey, United States
- Height: 5 ft 7 in (170 cm)

Gymnastics career
- Discipline: Trampoline gymnastics
- Country represented: USA; (10)
- Club: Elite Trampoline Academy
- Head coach: Tatiana Kovaleva
- Retired: 2016
Medal record
Men's trampoline gymnastics
Representing the United States
Pan American Games
Silver medal – second place	2015 Toronto	Individual
Pan American Championships
Gold medal – first place	2008 Buenos Aires	Synchro
Gold medal – first place	2010 Daytona Beach	Individual
Gold medal – first place	2010 Daytona Beach	Synchro
Gold medal – first place	2010 Daytona Beach	Team
Gold medal – first place	2014 Toronto	Synchro
Silver medal – second place	2014 Toronto	Team
Pacific Rim Championships
Silver medal – second place	2012 Everett	Individual
Bronze medal – third place	2016 Everett	Team
Bronze medal – third place	2012 Everett	Synchro
Bronze medal – third place	2012 Everett	Team
FIG World Cup
Gold medal – first place	2009 Ostend	Synchro
Gold medal – first place	2010 Davos	Synchro
Gold medal – first place	2010 Albacete	Synchro
Silver medal – second place	2010 Loule	Synchro

Steven Gluckstein (born June 24, 1990) is a former American 2012 Olympian in gymnastic trampoline. He is a six-time National Men's US Trampoline Champion, five-time National US Men's Synchronized Trampoline Champion, and a six-time World Team member. In 2009, he and his partner Logan Dooley were the first gymnastic trampolinists in Team USA history to win a gold medal at a World Cup Series event. Gluckstein retired from competitive gymnastics in 2016 and is currently the head coach of the Junior U.S. National Trampoline team, as well as a trainer at Elite Trampoline Academy in New Jersey. He also regularly works with his wife, Camilla Lopes Gomes, a top-ranked Brazilian trampolinist.

== Personal life and early career ==
Gluckstein was born in Red Bank, New Jersey and raised in Atlantic Highlands, New Jersey, the son of Loretta (née Abke) and Steven Gluckstein, Sr., a Wall Street Money Manager. He attended Henry Hudson Regional High School. He has a sister Amanda, and a brother Jeffrey who is currently an international competitive trampolinist also representing the USA. The Gluckstein brothers have created a dynasty in competitive US trampoline. Between both kin they have won every National Men's Trampoline Championship between 2009 and present (2019).

In June 2016, just days before competing in the US National Championships which assisted in deciding the one man who would represent Team USA at the 2016 Rio Olympic Games, Gluckstein married fellow trampolinist, Brazilian Camilla Lopes. They first met in Denmark in 2011 but later, after Lopes came to the US initially for a few months to train, they became romantically involved. The two currently live together in Atlantic Highlands, New Jersey. They also trained together at Gluckstein's long-time gym, Elite Trampoline Academy.

Early career

Gluckstein began his sporting life in taekwando where at 9 years old he reached the first degree of black belt. Unfortunately, shortly after reaching his new rank his school closed. Gluckstein explains how he transitioned to trampoline: "Thanks to the sport (taekwando) I was strong, flexible, fast, and disciplined. I was set up perfectly for my next sport. However, little did I know what my next sport would be. 'A jockey, a cheerleader, or a gymnast' were the options my mother gave. She made this decision because the tallest person in my ancestry up to my great grandparents was 5'11" and in my immediate family is 5'8". I was the smallest kid in my school class."

Gluckstein further explains, "Against my will my mother brought me to gymnastics. I was hesitant to go into the gym because of the 'girly' reputation gymnastics sometimes gets, but once I was in there it was a blast! I was jumping on trampolines, swinging on bars, and flipping into foam pits. I was quickly approached by a woman, Tatiana Kovaleva, who was a 1996-1999 (trampoline gymnastics) World Champion from Russia that just recently moved to the United States. She asked my parents if I would be interested in joining the Trampoline team. Despite our lack of knowledge in the sport, they knew I would be great in it."

== Competition ==
Gluckstein captured the first US Champion title of his career at the Visa Championships in August 2009, prevailing over the defending US Champion Chris Estrada with 108.8 points.

=== Trampoline and Tumbling World Cup ===
At the 2009 Trampoline World Cup in Belgium, Gluckstein and his partner, Logan Dooley, earned the first US Gold Medal in Gymnastic Trampoline at a FIG World Cup event by winning the Synchronized Men's Trampoline title. In 2010, the pair followed up that first with another for Team USA; Overall FIG Trampoline Gymnastics World Cup Series Champions - Men's Synchronized. The Series Champion in 2010 was determined by the team's top three finishes of the seven-series event. S Gluckstein/Dooley paired to take one silver and two gold medal finishes in Portugal, Switzerland and Spain, respectively. In the individual trampoline, Gluckstein finished 12th overall that year.

=== National competition results ===
- 2016 USA Gymnastics Championships, Providence, R.I. - 1st-TR, SY
- 2016 Elite Challenge, Colorado Springs, Colo. - 3rd-TR
- 2016 Winter Classic, Battle Creek, Mich. - 1st-SY; 3rd-TR
- 2015 USA Gymnastics Championships, Greensboro, N.C. - 1st-TR; 4th-SY
- 2015 Elite Challenge, Colorado Springs, Colo. - 1st-TR; 3rd-SY
- 2015 Kalon Ludvigson Invitational, Orem, Utah - 2nd-TR
- 2014 USA Gymnastics Championships, Louisville, Ky. - 1st-SY
- 2014 U.S. Elite Challenge, Spokane, Wash. - 1st-SY; 6th-TR
- 2014 Kalon Ludvigson Invitational, Salt Lake City, Utah - 1st-TR
- 2013 Stars & Stripes Cup, Daytona Beach, Fla. - 1st-TR; 3rd-SY
- 2013 U.S. T&T Championships, Kansas City, Mo. - 2nd-TR; 4th-SY
- 2013 U.S. Elite Challenge, Frisco, Texas - 1st-TR; 3rd-SY
- 2012 USA Gymnastics Trampoline Championships, San Jose, Calif. - 1st-TR; 2nd-SY
- 2012 Stars & Stripes Cup, Cleveland, Ohio - 1st-TR, SY
- 2012 Elite Challenge, Tulsa, Okla. - 1st-TR, SY
- 2011 U.S. Elite Championships, San Antonio, Texas - 4th-TR
- 2011 U.S. Elite Challenge, Fort Worth, Texas - 1st-SY; 2nd-TR
- 2011 Winter Classic, Houston, Texas - 1st-SY; 2nd-TR
- 2010 Visa Championships, Hartford, Conn. - 1st-TR, SY
- 2010 U.S. Elite Challenge, Virginia Beach, Va. - 1st-SY; 3rd-TR
- 2010 Fairland Classic, Laurel, Md. - 2nd-TR, SY
- 2009 Final Selection Event, Las Vegas, Nev. - 1st-SY; 2nd-TR
- 2009 Visa Championships, Dallas, Texas - 1st-TR, SY
- 2009 U.S. Elite Challenge, Ft. Smith, Ark. - 1st-TR, SY
- 2009 Winter Classic, Birmingham, Ala. - 1st-TR, SY
- 2008 Stars and Stripes Cup, Colorado Springs, Colo. - 1st-SY; 2nd-TR
- 2008 Final Selection Event, Kansas City, Kan. - 4th-TR
- 2008 Visa Championships, Houston, Texas - 1st-SY; 8th-TR
- 2008 U.S. Elite Challenge, Mobile, Ala. - 1st-TR, SY
- 2008 Winter Classic, Tulsa, Okla. - 1st-SY; 3rd-TR
- 2007 National Championships, Memphis, Tenn. - 1st-SY; 4th-TR
- 2007 U.S. Elite Challenge, Colorado Springs, Colo. - 2nd-TR, SY
- 2007 Winter Classic, Lubbock, Texas - 1st-TR; 2nd-SY
- 2006 U.S. Championships, Schaumburg, Ill. - 1st-DM, TR, SY (Jr. Div.)
- 2005 Men's Junior Olympic National Championships, Houston, Texas - 1st-TR
- 2004 U.S. Championships, Nashville, Tenn. - 1st-TR; 4th-SY (Jr. Div.)
- 2003 U.S. Championships, Sacramento, Calif. - 1st-TR, SY (Jr. Div.)

=== International competition results ===
- 2016 1st AERE Trampoline World Cup, Brescia, Italy - 51st-TR
- 2016 Shanghai World Cup, Shanghai, China - 9th-TR; 14th-SY
- 2016 Pacific Rim Championships, Everett, Wash. - 3rd-Team; 6th-TR
- 2015 World Championships, Odense, Denmark - 6th-Team; 8th-SY; 34th-TR
- 2015 World Cup, Mouilleron Le Captif, France - 11th-SY; 58th-TR
- 2015 World Cup, St Petersburg, Russia - 9th-TR; 27th-SY
- 2015 World Cup, Valladolid, Spain - 59th-TR; 4th-SY
- 2015 Pan American Games, Toronto, Canada - 2nd-TR
- 2014 Pan American Championships, Toronto, Canada - 1st-SY; 2nd-Team; 9th-TR
- 2014 Nissen World Cup, Arosa, Switzerland - 12th-TR; 21st-SY
- 2014 World Cup, Minsk, Belarus - 15th-SY; 16th-TR
- 2014 Stars & Stripes Cup, Daytona Beach, Fla. - 3rd-SY
- 2013 World Championships, Sofia, Bulgaria - 7th-Team; 10th-TR; 23rd-SY
- 2013 World Cup, Odense, Denmark - 7th-SY; 16th-TR
- 2013 World Cup, Valladolid, Spain - 6th-TR, SY
- 2013 Aalsmeer Flower Cup, Aalsmeer, Netherlands - 1st-TR
- 2012 Olympics, London, United Kingdom - 16th-TR
- 2012 World Cup, Taiyuan, China - 5th-TR
- 2012 Pacific Rim Championships, Everett, Wash. - 2nd-TR; 3rd-Team, SY
- 2012 Test Event, London, England - 10th-TR
- 2011 World Championships, Birmingham, England - 11th-SY; 14th-Team; 26th-TR
- 2011 Pan American Games, Guadalajara, Mexico - 6th-TR
- 2011 Salzgitter World Cup, Salzgitter, Germany - 5th-TR; 6th-SY
- 2011 Flower Cup, Aalsmeer, Netherlands - 4th-TR
- 2010 Pan American Cup, Guadalajara, Mexico - 9th-TR
- 2010 World Championships, Metz, France - 6th-SY; 12th-TR
- 2010 World Cup, Albacete, Spain - 1st-SY; 4th-TR
- 2010 World Cup, Loule, Portugal - 2nd-SY; 5th-TR
- 2010 World Cup, Davos, Switzerland - 1st-SY
- 2010 Pan American Championships, Daytona Beach, Fla. - 1st-TR, SY, Team
- 2009 World Championships, St. Petersburg, Russia - 4th-TR (Team); 6th-SY
- 2009 World Cup, Zielona Gora, Poland - 4th-SY; 8th-TR
- 2009 World Cup, Ostend, Belgium - 1st-SY; 5th-TR
- 2009 Canada Cup, Okotoks, Alberta, Canada - 2nd-SY; 4th-TR
- 2009 World Games, Kaohsiung, Taiwan - 6th-SY
- 2009 International Frivolten Cup, Herrljunga, Sweden - 1st-TR
- 2008 Pan American Championships, Buenos Aires, Argentina - 1st-SY; 4th-TR (Team)
- 2008 Grenzland Cup, Aachen, Germany - 6th-TR
- 2007 World Championships, Quebec City, Quebec, Canada - 2007 World Cup, St. Petersburg, Russia
- 2007 World Cup, Ostend, Belgium
- 2007 World Cup, Lake Placid, N.Y.
- 2007 World Cup, Quebec City, Quebec, Canada
- 2006 Flanders International Cup, Ghent, Belgium - 1st-DM, TR
- 2006 Grenzland Cup, Aachen, Germany - 1st-TR (Jr. Div.)
- 2006 Pacific Alliance Championships, Honolulu, Hawaii - 1st-TR (Jr. Div.)
- 2005 International Age Group Competition, Eindhoven, Netherlands - 2nd-DM; 8th-TR
- 2005 Flower Cup, Aalsmeer, Netherlands - 1st-TR
- 2004 Pan American Championships, Tampa, Fla. - 4th-TR
- 2003 World Age Group Games, Hannover, Germany - 9th-TR; 11th-SY
