= Logan Dooley =

American trampoline gymnast

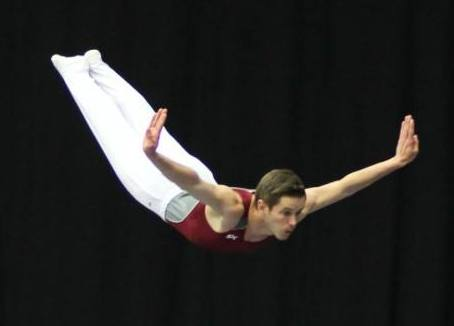
- Logan Dooley is an American trampoline athlete.

Personal information
- Born: September 26, 1987 (age 39)
- Height: 5 ft 9 in (175 cm)

Gymnastics career
- Discipline: Trampoline gymnastics
- Country represented: USA; (USA)
- Club: World Elite Gymnastics
- Head coach: Robert Null
Medal record
Men's trampoline gymnastics
Representing the United States
Pan American Championships
Gold medal – first place	2014 Mississauga	Synchro
Gold medal – first place	2010 Daytona Beach	Synchro
Gold medal – first place	2010 Daytona Beach	Team
Gold medal – first place	2008 Buenos Aires	Synchro
Silver medal – second place	2014 Mississauga	Team
Silver medal – second place	2010 Daytona Beach	Individual
Bronze medal – third place	2014 Mississauga	Individual
Bronze medal – third place	2008 Buenos Aires	Individual

Logan Dooley (born September 26, 1987) is an American trampoline gymnast. Dooley has competed at both American national and international level and was named as one of the "Fresh Faces of the 2012 Summer Olympics" by USA Today.

== Early years ==
An active child from birth, Dooley's parents gave him a trampoline for his seventh birthday as an avenue through which to channel his energy and jumping impulses. Shortly after, Dooley's parents enlisted the instruction of trampoline coach, Robert Null, who coached Dooley until he retired.

== Competition ==
Dooley's victory in a 2009 World Cup event in Ostend, Belgium, was the first ever World Cup victory by an American. In 2010, Dooley and his partner, Steven Gluckstein earned the first gold medal for the United States at a World Championship event by winning the synchronised trampoline title. They took top honours for the seven-event series based on their performances in the event at the World Cup in Albacete, Spain, the Nissen Cup in Davos, Switzerland and the World Cup in Loulé, Portugal.

Dooley was the champion in the male individual trampoline after taking out gold in 2010 during the Pan American Championships in Mexico. He also has won the gold in synchro at the 2008, 2010, and 2014 Pan American Championships. Additionally, he has won the US national synchronized trampoline title a total of six times.

Dooley served as alternate for the 2008 Beijing and 2012 London Olympic Games and earned a spot to represent Team USA at the 2016 Rio Olympics where he finished 11th, which is the highest finish for a U.S. men's trampolinist at the Olympics. In 2020, he was the coach of trampoline Olympic alternate, Charlotte Drury.

National competition results:

- 2017 USA Gymnastics Championships, Milwaukee, Wis. - 2nd-SY; 4th-TR
- 2017 Elite Challenge, Colorado Springs, Colo. - 2nd-SY; 6th-TR
- 2017 Winter Classic, Battle Creek, Mich. - 3rd-SY
- 2016 USA Gymnastics Championships, Providence, R.I. - 1st-SY; 2nd-TR
- 2016 Elite Challenge, Colorado Springs, Colo. - 1st-TR
- 2016 Winter Classic, Battle Creek, Mich. - 1st-SY; 2nd-TR
- 2015 USA Gymnastics Championships, Greensboro, N.C. - 2nd-TR; 4th-SY
- 2015 Elite Challenge, Colorado Springs, Colo. - 2nd-TR; 3rd-SY
- 2015 Kalon Ludvigson Invitational, Orem, Utah - 1st-TR
- 2014 USA Gymnastics Championships, Louisville, Ky. - 1st-SY; 3rd-TR
- 2014 U.S. Elite Challenge, Spokane, Wash. - 1st-SY; 2nd-TR
- 2014 Stars & Stripes Cup, Daytona Beach, Fla. - 3rd-SY; 6th-TR
- 2014 Kalon Ludvigson Invitational, Salt Lake City, Utah - 2nd-TR
- 2013 Stars & Stripes Cup, Daytona Beach, Fla. - 2nd-TR
- 2013 U.S. T&T Championships, Kansas City, Mo. - 1st-SY; 3rd-TR
- 2013 U.S. Elite Challenge, Frisco, Texas - 1st-SY; 2nd-TR
- 2012 USA Gymnastics Trampoline Championships, San Jose, Calif. - 2nd-TR, SY
- 2012 Stars & Stripes Cup, Cleveland, Ohio - 1st-SY; 3rd-TR
- 2012 Elite Challenge, Tulsa, Okla. - 1st-SY; 3rd-TR
- 2011 U.S. Elite Championships, San Antonio, Texas - 2nd-TR
- 2011 U.S. Elite Challenge, Fort Worth, Texas - 1st-SY; 4th-TR
- 2011 Winter Classic, Houston, Texas - 1st-TR, SY
- 2010 Visa Championships, Hartford, Conn. - 1st-SY; 2nd-TR
- 2010 U.S. Elite Challenge, Virginia Beach, Va. - 1st-TR, SY
- 2010 Fairland Classic, Laurel, Md. - 1st-TR
- 2009 Final Selection Event, Las Vegas, Nev. - 1st-TR, SY
- 2009 Visa Championships, Dallas, Texas - 1st-SY; 3rd-TR
- 2009 U.S. Elite Challenge, Ft. Smith, Ark. - 1st-SY; 2nd-TR
- 2009 Winter Classic, Birmingham, Ala. - 1st-SY; 3rd-TR
- 2008 Stars and Stripes Cup, Colorado Springs, Colo. - 1st-TR; 2nd-SY
- 2008 Final Selection Event, Kansas City, Kan. - 2nd-TR
- 2008 Visa Championships, Houston, Texas - 1st-SY; 3rd-TR
- 2008 U.S. Elite Challenge, Mobile, Ala. - 1st-SY; 3rd-TR
- 2008 Winter Classic, Tulsa, Okla. - 1st-TR, SY
- 2007 National Championships, Memphis, Tenn. - 1st-SY; 5th-TR
- 2007 U.S. Elite Challenge, Colorado Springs, Colo. - 2nd-SY
- 2007 Winter Classic, Lubbock, Texas - 1st-SY; 3rd-TR
- 2007 Winter Classic, Lubbock, Texas - 1st-SY; 3rd-TR
- 2006 U.S. Championships, Schaumburg, Ill. - 2nd-SY; 6th-TR
- 2006 U.S. Elite Challenge, Las Vegas, Nev. - 4th-TR
- 2006 Winter Classic, Birmingham, Ala. - 1st-SY; 4th-TR

International competition results:

- 2017 World Championships, Sofia, Bulgaria - 27th-TR
- 2016 Olympic Games, Rio de Janeiro, Brazil - 11th-TR
- 2016 1st AERE Trampoline World Cup, Brescia, Italy - 22nd-TR
- 2016 Shanghai World Cup, Shanghai, China - 12th-TR; 9th SY
- 2016 Aquece Rio Final Gymnastics Qualifier, Rio de Janeiro, Brazil - 6th-TR
- 2015 World Championships, Odense, Denmark - 8th-SY
- 2015 World Cup, Mouilleron Le Captif, France - 19th TR; 8th SY
- 2015 Spain World Cup, Valladolid, Spain - 4th-SY
- 2015 Pan American Games, Toronto, Canada - 7th-TR
- 2014 World Championships, Daytona Beach, Fla. - 16th TR; 14th SY
- 2014 Minsk World Cup, Minsk, Belarus - 19th TR; 14th SY
- 2014 Pan American Championships, Toronto, Canada - 1st-SY; 2nd-TR (Team); 3rd-TR
- 2013 World Championships, Sofia, Bulgaria - 7th-TR
- 2013 Odense World Cup, Odense, Denmark - 13th-TR; 10th SY
- 2013 City of Valladolid Trampoline World Cup, Valladolid, Spain - 5th-TR
- 2012 Visa International Gymnastics, London, England - 14th-TR
- 2011 World Championships, Birmingham, England - 26th-TR
- 2011 Flower Cup, Aalsmeer, Netherlands - 26th-TR
- 2010 Pan American Cup, Guadalajara, Mexico - 1st-TR
- 2010 World Championships, Metz, France - 6th-SY
- 2010 World Cup, Loule, Portugal - 2nd-SY; 5th-TR
- 2010 World Cup, Albacete, Spain - 1st-SY; 6th-TR
- 2010 Nissen Cup, Davos, Switzerland - 1st-SY; 7th-TR
- 2010 Frivolten Cup, Herrljunga, Sweden - 3rd-TR
- 2010 Pan American Championships, Daytona Beach, Fla. - 1st-SY, Team (TR); 2nd-TR
- 2009 World Championships, St. Petersburg, Russia - 4th-TR (Team); 6th-SY
- 2009 World Cup, Zielona Gora, Poland - 4th-SY
- 2009 World Cup, Ostend, Belgium - 1st-TR, SY
- 2009 Canada Cup, Okotoks, Alberta, Canada - 2nd-SY; 3rd-TR
- 2009 World Games, Kaohsiung, Taiwan - 6th-SY
- 2009 International Frivolten Cup, Herrljunga, Sweden - 2nd-TR
- 2008 Pan American Championships, Buenos Aires, Argentina - 1st-SY; 3rd-TR; 4th-TR (Team)
- 2008 Grenzland Cup, Aachen, Germany - 9th-TR
- 2007 World Championships, Quebec City, Quebec, Canada - 10th-SY
- 2007 World Cup, St. Petersburg, Russia -
- 2007 World Cup, Quebec City, Quebec, Canada -
- 2007 World Cup, Lake Placid, N.Y. -
- 2006 Frivolten Cup, Herrljunga, Sweden - 2nd-TR(T)

== Personal life ==
Dooley was born in Lake Forest, California, to Nancy and Jim Dooley. He has three older brothers: Jeffrey, Ryan, and Erik. Dooley graduated from El Toro High School in 2005 and has attended community colleges in Orange County and Colorado. He also spent some time working at Disneyland in 2005–2006. Jim Dooley died in 2012. On August 31, 2019, Dooley married Erin Porras who is a nurse and also coaches at World Elite.

== Philanthropy ==
Dooley has been known to have a special interest in The Prentice School, which is an independent, non-profit school that Dooley describes as "dedicated to empowering students with dyslexia to build their foundation for success." An alumnus of the school and a sufferer of dyslexia himself, Dooley supports The Prentice School by guest speaking in their classrooms, at leadership conferences and at fundraising events for the school.

== Endorsement ==
Dooley endorses an Australian trampoline company, Vuly Trampolines. He has appeared in their 2009 product catalogue amongst other endorsement activities. He is also endorsed by Eurotramp, a European trampoline manufacturer.
