= Rosie MacLennan =

Canadian trampoline gymnast

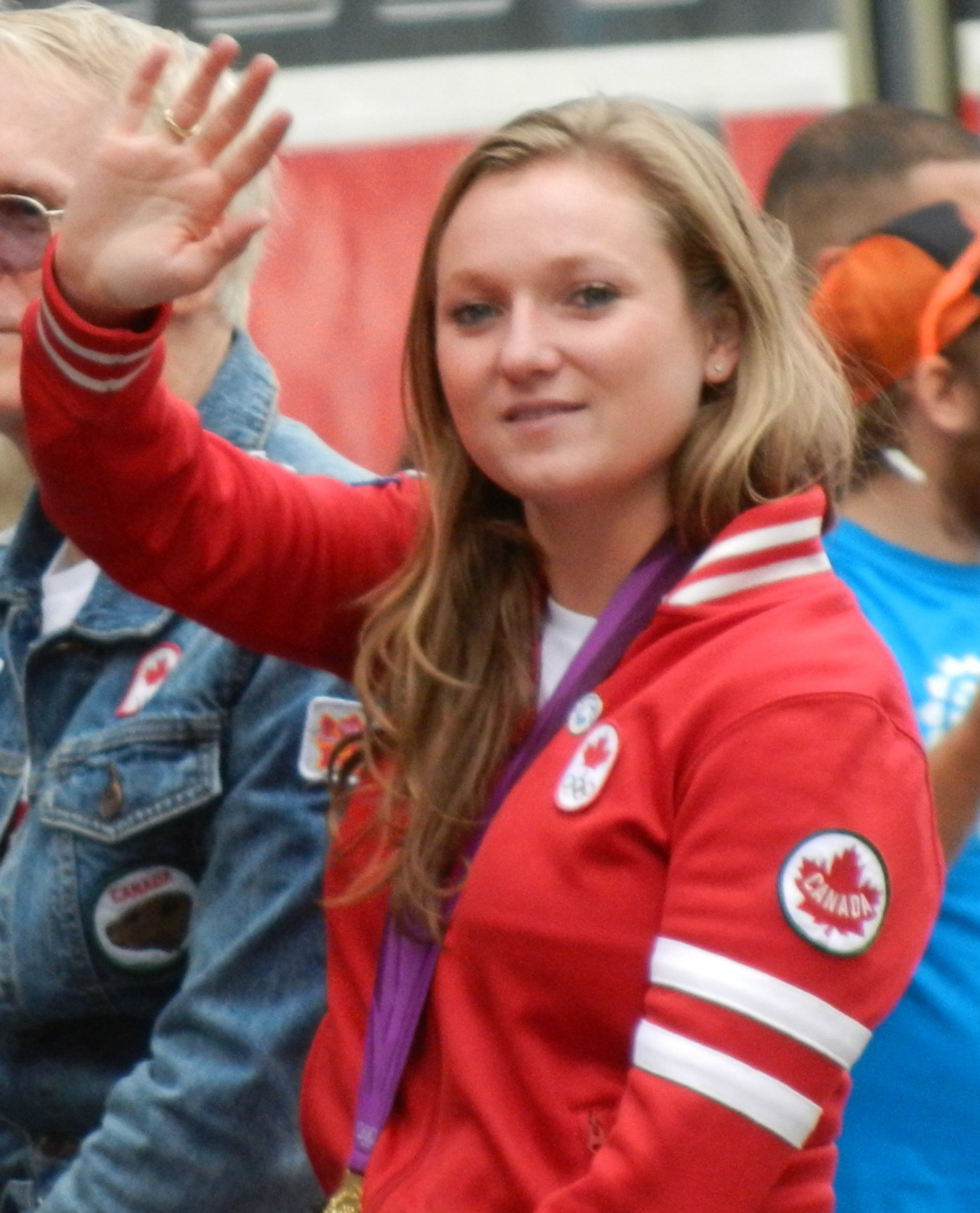
- MacLennan at the Olympic Heroes Parade in Toronto (September 2012)

Personal information
- Full name: Rosannagh MacLennan
- Nickname: Rosie
- Born: August 28, 1988 (age 38) King, Ontario, Canada
- Height: 158 cm (5 ft 2 in)

Gymnastics career
- Discipline: Trampoline gymnastics
- Country represented: Canada
- Club: Skyriders Trampoline Place
- Head coach: David Ross
Medal record
Women's trampoline gymnastics
Representing Canada
Event	1st	2nd	3rd
Olympic Games	2	0	0
World Championships	3	9	7
Pan American Games	2	1	0
Pan American Championships	6	0	1
Pacific Rim Championships	5	1	0
Total	18	11	8
Olympic Games
Gold medal – first place	2012 London	Individual
Gold medal – first place	2016 Rio de Janeiro	Individual
World Championships
Gold medal – first place	2007 Quebec	Synchro
Gold medal – first place	2013 Sofia	Individual
Gold medal – first place	2018 St. Petersburg	Individual
Silver medal – second place	2005 Eindhoven	Synchro
Silver medal – second place	2007 Quebec	Team
Silver medal – second place	2009 St Petersburg	Synchro
Silver medal – second place	2011 Birmingham	Individual
Silver medal – second place	2011 Birmingham	Synchro
Silver medal – second place	2013 Sofia	Team
Silver medal – second place	2014 Daytona Beach	Individual
Silver medal – second place	2014 Daytona Beach	Synchro
Silver medal – second place	2018 St. Petersburg	Synchro
Bronze medal – third place	2007 Quebec	Individual
Bronze medal – third place	2009 St Petersburg	Team
Bronze medal – third place	2010 Metz	Individual
Bronze medal – third place	2011 Birmingham	Team
Bronze medal – third place	2018 St. Petersburg	All-around Team
Bronze medal – third place	2019 Tokyo	Team
Bronze medal – third place	2019 Tokyo	Individual
Pan American Games
Gold medal – first place	2011 Guadalajara	Individual
Gold medal – first place	2015 Toronto	Individual
Silver medal – second place	2007 Rio de Janeiro	Individual
Pan American Championships
Gold medal – first place	2006 Monterrey	Team
Gold medal – first place	2008 Buenos Aires	Individual
Gold medal – first place	2008 Buenos Aires	Synchro
Gold medal – first place	2014 Mississauga	Individual
Gold medal – first place	2014 Mississauga	Synchro
Gold medal – first place	2014 Mississauga	Team
Bronze medal – third place	2006 Monterrey	Individual
Pacific Rim Championships
Gold medal – first place	2012 Everett	Individual
Gold medal – first place	2012 Everett	Synchro
Gold medal – first place	2012 Everett	Team
Gold medal – first place	2014 Richmond	Individual
Gold medal – first place	2014 Richmond	Synchro
Silver medal – second place	2014 Richmond	Team

Rosannagh "Rosie" MacLennan (born August 28, 1988) is a Canadian retired trampoline gymnast. She is the 2013 and 2018 World Trampoline champion, 2012 and 2016 Olympic champion, and 2011 and 2015 Pan American Games champion in the individual trampoline event. MacLennan was the Canadian National Women's champion in 2005, 2009 and 2011, and in 2007 was the World Champion in synchronized trampoline with Karen Cockburn. She has also won five silver and four bronze medals in World Championship competition in both the individual and synchro events. MacLennan trains at Skyrider's Trampoline Place in Richmond Hill, Ontario, with coach David Ross, who has coached all of Canada's Olympic trampolinists.

== Background ==
MacLennan was born in the township of King, Ontario. Her parents are Jane and John MacLennan. Her grandfather was selected as a gymnast for the 1940 Summer Olympics in Tokyo, but was unable to compete as the games were cancelled due to the outbreak of World War II. Rosie MacLennan also suffered a mild concussion before the 2015 Pan Am Games in Toronto.

== Career ==
MacLennan has competed internationally at various levels since 1999. In 2006, she paired with her training partner, the Olympian Karen Cockburn, in synchronized trampoline and the pair would go on to dominate the event internationally, winning eight consecutive World Cup events including the World Cup Finals in Birmingham in 2006. That year she also graduated from King City Secondary School, where she was a cheerleader during her final year.

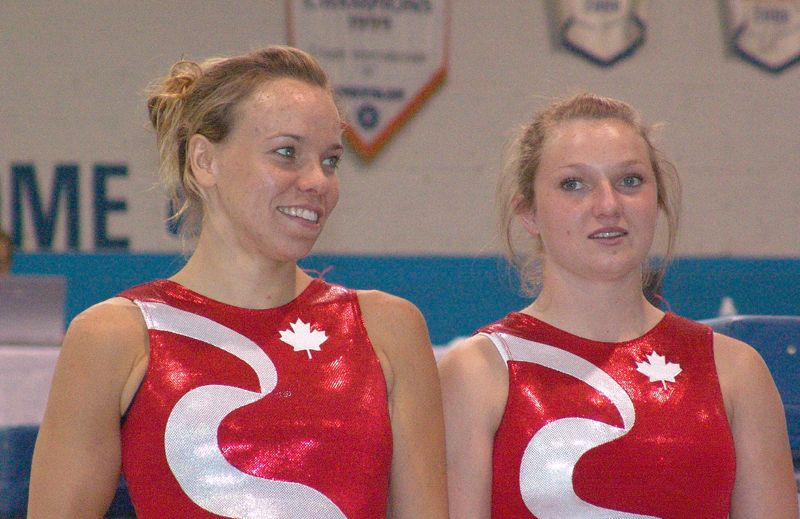
MacLennan with her synchro partner Karen Cockburn in 2007

In the 2007 World Championships in Quebec City they again won the event The pair hold the current female synchronized trampoline routine world record for difficulty with a DD of 14.20 which they scored in April 2007 at the Lake Placid Trampoline World Cup. Her results at the 2007 World Championships qualified her for the 2008 Summer Olympics in Beijing.

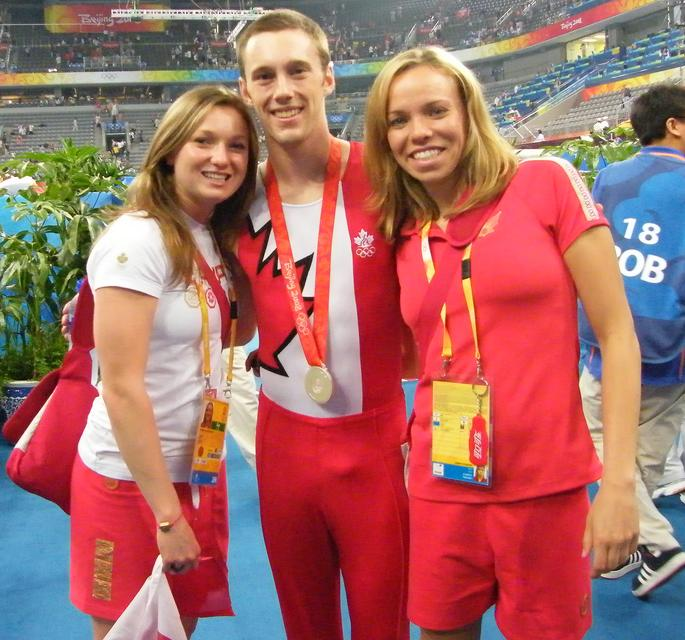
Rosie MacLennan (left) with Jason Burnett and Karen Cockburn at the Beijing Summer Olympics 2008

Following the 2007 World Championships, MacLennan came in second place in the Good Luck Beijing International Invitational Tournament, a competition held to test the facilities and organization for the 2008 Beijing Olympic Games. In June 2008, she was selected to join Karen Cockburn and Jason Burnett as one of Canada's three trampoline gymnasts at the 2008 Summer Olympics in Beijing. In the trampoline preliminary competition, she qualified in 3rd place for the Finals but eventually finished in 7th place.

After the 2008 Olympics, MacLennan won the 2009 Canadian Women's Individual title. She came in 4th place for individual trampoline in the 2009 Trampoline World Championships in St Petersburg and 3rd place for individual trampoline in the 2010 Trampoline World Championships in Metz. In 2011, she again won the Canadian Championships and came in 1st place at the Pan American Games in Guadalajara, Mexico and 2nd place in the 2011 Trampoline World Championships in Birmingham which won a place for Canadian women in the Trampoline event for the 2012 London Olympics. She obtained a Bachelor of Physical and Health Education degree from the University of Toronto in November 2011 and is returning to University of Toronto's Faculty of Kinesiology and Physical Education to pursue a master's degree.

Her next major competition was at the 2012 Gymnastics Olympic Test Event, held in the same location as the Olympics. MacLennan won that event against some of the Olympic competitors that she would later face. In May 2012 she suffered a concussion and had to be cautious in her training, missing the 2012 Canadian Trampoline Championships. However at the 2012 Summer Olympics in London, she put on her best performance ever with a finals routine of 57.305, which was the gold-medal winning score for Canada. This was the first and only gold medal for Canada at these games and the first Canadian trampoline gold medal ever. She commented on her gold medal performance: "I was shocked. It's the biggest score that I've ever gotten and I knew that it would be a tough one to catch. But you never want to get ahead of yourself, you want to wait until all the competitors are done." There were three competitors left to compete. The two Chinese competitors were both considered good gold medal prospects, but neither managed to beat her score, confirming the gold for MacLennan. China's He Wenna fell at the end of her performance but narrowly beat out MacLennan's Canadian teammate Karen Cockburn for the bronze medal. MacLennan's result as Canada's only gold-medal winner brought out support in Canada for her to be the nation's flagbearer for the closing ceremony; however, soccer player Christine Sinclair was eventually given the honour, to a little controversy.

In November 2013, MacLennan won the gold medal at the World Championship in Sofia, Bulgaria.

In May 2014, MacLennan won the Canadian National Championship in Ottawa. During training before the 2015 Pan American Games, she sustained a mild concussion when she landed on the side of a trampoline. She won the women's trampoline event at the Pan American Games two weeks later, then undertook physical and cognitive rest to recover from the concussion. She stated that she was "having some issues with spatial awareness" after the concussion with symptoms including headaches, dizziness, and photosensitivity. The concussion's effects were resolved over five months of rest, mental exercises, and finally physical exercise. She conducted exercises with a vestibular ocular therapist to restore her balance and timing, and began doing flips again by November 2015.

In 2016, she won the Canadian National Championship in Edmonton.

MacLennan was Canada's flagbearer in the opening ceremony of the 2016 Summer Olympics. She successfully defended her Olympic title on August 12, 2016. She is the first Canadian to do so in an individual sport at the Summer Olympics and the first trampolinist, male or female, to successfully defend their Olympic title.

She competed at the delayed 2020 Summer Olympics in Tokyo, Japan, where she finished fourth.

MacLennan announced her retirement from trampolining in December 2022.

== Personal life ==
MacLennan married Nick Snow, former University of Toronto basketball star, in 2018. After her retirement, she earned a Master of Business Administration (MBA) degree from Stanford University.

Olympic Games
Preceded by Hayley Wickenheiser	Flagbearer for Canada; Rio de Janeiro 2016	Succeeded by Tessa Virtue; Scott Moir
