= Carlos Ramirez Pala =

Brazilian trampoline gymnast

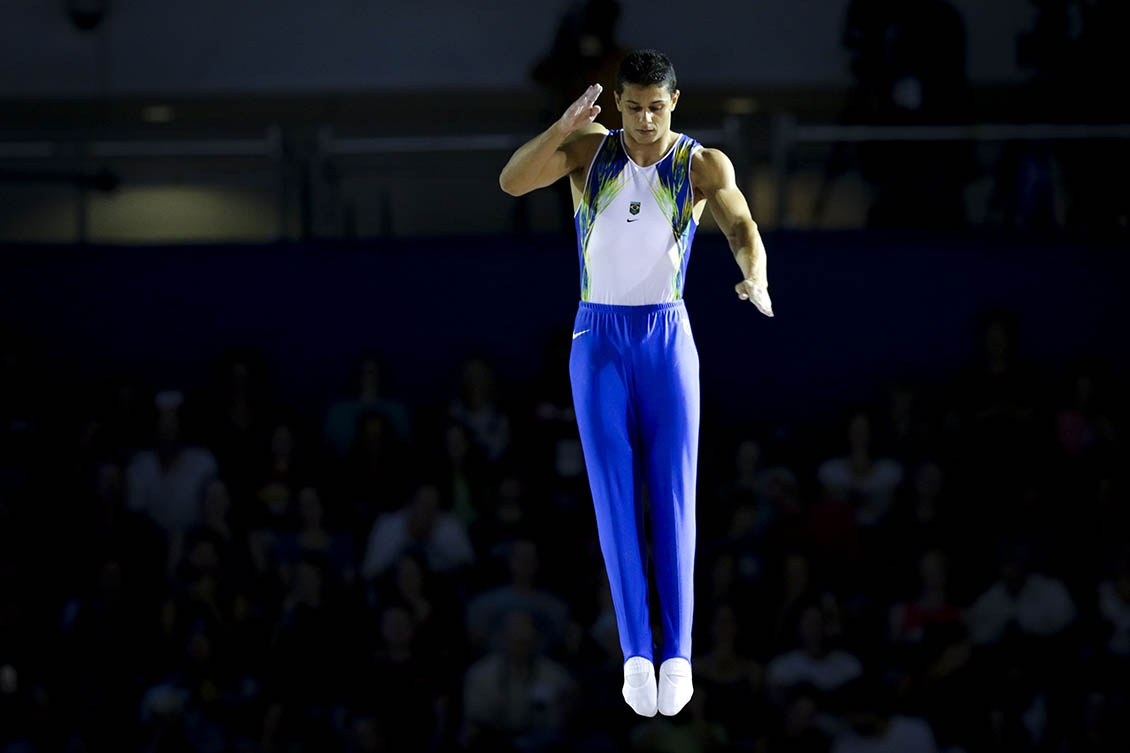
- Ramirez Pala competing at the 2015 Pan American Games

Personal information
- Full name: Carlos Ramirez de Azevedo Silva Pala
- Born: 26 July 1985 (age 41)

Gymnastics career
- Discipline: Trampoline gymnastics
- Country represented: Brazil (2010-)
Medal record
Men's trampoline gymnastics
Representing Brazil
Pan American Championships
Gold medal – first place	2012 Querétaro	Team
Silver medal – second place	2008 Buenos Aires	Team
Silver medal – second place	2012 Querétaro	Synchro
Bronze medal – third place	2010 Daytona Beach	Individual
Bronze medal – third place	2010 Daytona Beach	Team
Bronze medal – third place	2014 Mississauga	Synchro
Bronze medal – third place	2014 Mississauga	Team
South American Championships
Gold medal – first place	2013 Bogotá	Synchro
Bronze medal – third place	2013 Bogotá	Team

Carlos Ramirez de Azevedo Silva Pala (born 26 July 1985) is a Brazilian individual and synchronised trampoline gymnast, representing his nation at international competitions. He competed at world championships, including at the 2010, 2011, 2013, 2014 and 2015 Trampoline World Championships.
