= Jason Burnett =

Canadian trampoline gymnast

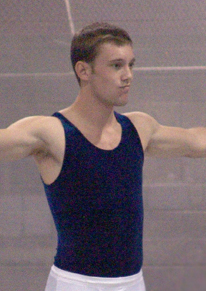
- Jason Burnett presenting before starting a routine

Personal information
- Born: December 16, 1986 (age 39) Toronto, Ontario
- Height: 5 ft 5 in (1.65 m)

Gymnastics career
- Discipline: Trampoline gymnastics
- Country represented: Canada
Medal record
Men's trampoline gymnastics
Representing Canada
Olympic Games
| Silver medal – second place | 2008 Beijing | Individual |
Pan American Games
| Silver medal – second place | 2007 Rio de Janeiro | Individual |
Pan American Championships
| Gold medal – first place | 2018 Lima | Team |
| Gold medal – first place | 2014 Mississauga | Individual |
| Gold medal – first place | 2014 Mississauga | Team |
| Gold medal – first place | 2008 Buenos Aires | Individual |
| Gold medal – first place | 2008 Buenos Aires | Team |
| Gold medal – first place | 2006 Monterrey | Individual |
| Gold medal – first place | 2004 Tampa | Synchro |
| Silver medal – second place | 2018 Lima | Individual |
| Silver medal – second place | 2006 Monterrey | Team |
| Silver medal – second place | 2004 Tampa | Individual |
Pacific Rim Championships
| Gold medal – first place | 2012 Everett | Individual |
| Silver medal – second place | 2014 Richmond | Team |

Jason Nicholas Burnett (born December 16, 1986) is a Canadian trampoline gymnast from Etobicoke, Ontario. He is noted for having completed, in training, the world's most difficult trampoline routine with a degree of difficulty of 20.6 and holding the former world record of 18.8 for a routine performed in a competition. He has placed first in the Canadian National Championships eight times in individual trampoline. In the 2008 Olympic Games he won a silver medal.

== Career ==
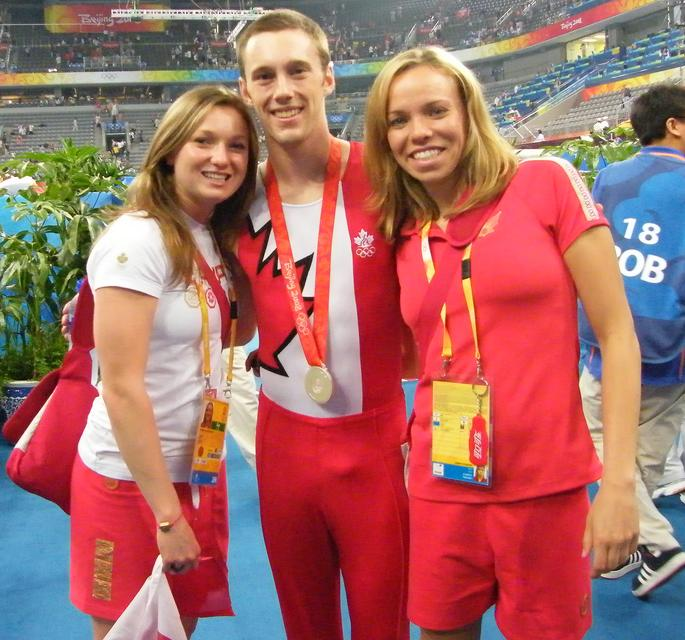
Jason Burnett (center) with the silver medal he won at the 2008 Summer Olympics

On June 12, 2010, at the Davos Trampoline World Cup he completed a routine with a degree of difficulty (DD or tariff) of 18.80 breaking his own world record of 18.0. He finished in 2nd place in the competition. He also holds the world record for a synchronised trampoline routine with his partner, Philip Barbaro, with a DD of 16.0. However, as their marks for synchronisation and execution were very low, they only came in 7th place in the competition in Quebec City in 2007.

He has won the Canadian Senior Men's Trampoline Championship eight times, most recently in Ottawa in 2014.

He currently trains at Skyriders Trampoline Place in Richmond Hill alongside Karen Cockburn and Rosannagh MacLennan with trainer Dave Ross.

In the preliminary round of the 2008 Summer Olympics in Beijing, Burnett finished in seventh place and qualified for the finals of the trampoline event after a very strong optional routine. In the finals, he won the silver medal in the event with the most difficult routine of the competition.

Before Burnett broke his fibula in 2010, he won 1st place for Men's Individual Trampoline at the Elite Canada competition in Airdrie, Alberta. At the Pacific Rim Championships, Burnett won 1st place in both Men's Individual Trampoline and Men's Synchronized Trampoline along with his partner, Charles Thibault. Moreover, Burnett took home 1st again at the Canadian Championships in Kamloops, British Columbia.

In 2011, Burnett won 1st place for Individual Trampoline at the Canada Cup in Airdrie, Alberta with a 17.8 DD. At the same competition, he also took home 2nd place for Synchronized Trampoline (again, with Charles Thibault as his partner).

In January 2012, at the 2012 Gymnastics Olympic Test Event, Burnett finished in 4th place which qualified Canada for a place in the Men's Trampoline event at the 2012 Summer Olympics in London. He was later selected as the Olympic competitor following a series of qualifying competitions. At the Olympic Games, he finished in 8th place.

In May 2014, Burnett won the Men's title in the Canadian National Championship in Ottawa. Later in 2014, he injured his leg and had to have surgery to repair knee ligaments. He managed to come back and win his 9th Canadian Individual Trampoline Championship in July 2015. In the Pan Am Games in Toronto, he came 4th.

== Honours ==
In 2012 Burnett was awarded the Queen Elizabeth II Diamond Jubilee Medal.
