= Karen Cockburn =

Canadian trampoline gymnast

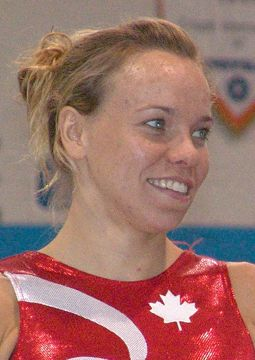
- Cockburn in 2007

Personal information
- Born: October 2, 1980 (age 45) Toronto, Ontario

Gymnastics career
- Discipline: Trampoline gymnastics
- Country represented: Canada
- Retired: July 16, 2017
Medal record
Women's trampoline gymnastics
Representing Canada
Olympic Games
Silver medal – second place	2004 Athens	Individual
Silver medal – second place	2008 Beijing	Individual
Bronze medal – third place	2000 Sydney	Individual
World Championships
Gold medal – first place	2003 Hannover	Individual
Gold medal – first place	2007 Quebec	Synchro
Silver medal – second place	2007 Quebec	Team
Silver medal – second place	2009 St Petersburg	Synchro
Silver medal – second place	2011 Birmingham	Synchro
Bronze medal – third place	2009 St Petersburg	Individual
Bronze medal – third place	2009 St Petersburg	Team
Bronze medal – third place	2011 Birmingham	Team
Pan American Games
Gold medal – first place	2007 Rio de Janeiro	Individual
Bronze medal – third place	2015 Toronto	Individual
Pan American Championships
Gold medal – first place	2006 Monterrey	Individual
Gold medal – first place	2006 Monterrey	Team
Gold medal – first place	2014 Mississauga	Team
Pacific Rim Championships
Gold medal – first place	2012 Everett	Synchro
Gold medal – first place	2012 Everett	Team
Silver medal – second place	2012 Everett	Individual

Karen Cockburn (born October 2, 1980) is a Canadian trampoline gymnast. She won a bronze medal at the 2000 Summer Olympics in the individual event. She won a gold medal at the 2003 Trampoline World Championships in Hannover, Germany in the same event and a bronze in the team event. At the 2004 Summer Olympics and 2008 Summer Olympics, she won a silver medal in the individual event.

== Background ==
Cockburn was born in Toronto and grew up in North York, Ontario. She began trampolining at age 11, and was a student at York University. She is a member of the Skyriders Trampoline Place and is coached by Dave Ross.

Following the Lake Placid and Quebec City World Cup competitions that took place in April 2007, the FIG World Rankings were updated. The women's ranking saw four time World Champion and five time World Cup Final winner Irina Karavaeva of Russia retake top place from Cockburn in Women's Individual Trampoline after Karavaeva won the gold medal at both of the World Cups. Cockburn and her partner, Rosannagh MacLennan, were ranked first in Women's Synchronised Trampoline following their two winning performances in 2007.

== Career ==
After winning the Canadian National Trampoline Championships seven years in a row, Cockburn made an error in her second routine (of three) and came in 6th place in the 2005 finals on June 1, 2005. She was beaten by her partner in synchronized trampoline, Rosannagh MacLennan. Later in June, she competed in the Trampoline World Cup and came in 3rd in the individual competition and won gold in synchronized trampoline with Rosannagh MacLennan. In September 2005 at the Trampoline World Championships in Eindhoven, Netherlands, the pair came 2nd in synchronized trampoline and Cockburn came 6th in the individual event.

In the 2006 Canadian National Trampoline championships in Quebec City, Cockburn regained her title beating MacLennan into second place, on May 20, 2006. On November 25, 2006, Cockburn won both the Individual gold medal and, with MacLennan, the synchronized gold medal at the Trampoline and Tumbling World Cup Final competition in Birmingham. In April 2007 at the Lake Placid Trampoline World Cup, the Cockburn and MacLennan achieved a new female synchronised trampoline routine world record for difficulty with a DD of 14.20.

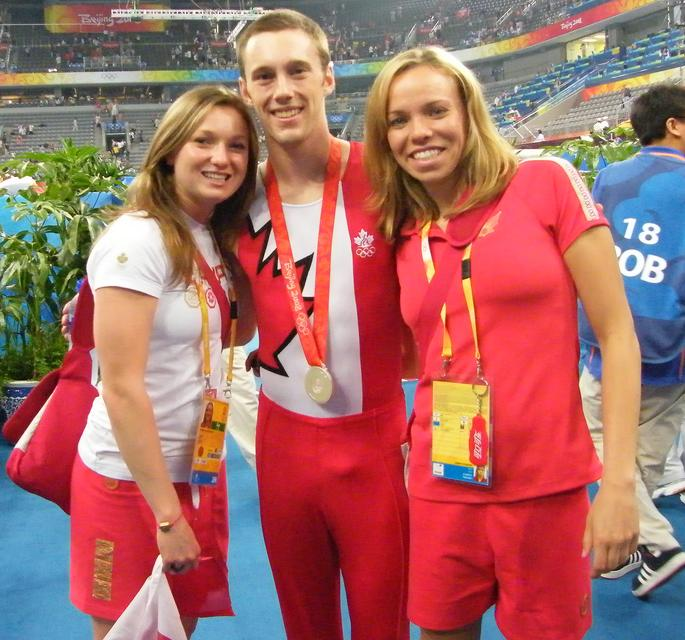
Karen Cockburn (right) at the 2008 Summer Olympics with teammates Rosannagh MacLennan (left) and Jason Burnett (center)

At the 2007 Canadian Trampoline Championships in Regina, Saskatchewan, Cockburn took first place, edging out MacLennan by 2.5 points with a score of 106.90 in the Women's Senior Individual trampoline category. In the category of synchronized trampoline, Cockburn and MacLennan won the gold with a score of 131.70.

On November 3, 2007, at the 2007 Trampoline World Championships in Quebec City, Cockburn and MacLennan won the synchronised event, maintaining their unbroken string of nine first-place finishes in World Cup and World Championships. In the individual final, Cockburn did not complete her routine and finished in 8th place. However, her and MacLennan's rankings in the preliminary round earned two women's places at the 2008 Olympic Games for Canada.

On June 7, 2008, Cockburn won her 10th Senior Women's Trampoline Canadian Championship in Calgary, beating MacLennan into second place. Both women, however, with Jason Burnett were named to compete for Canada at the 2008 Summer Olympics in Beijing.

Cockburn qualified for the finals in 4th place, and on August 18, 2008, she won a silver medal in the women's final at the 2008 Summer Olympics in Beijing. She was the only trampoline athlete to have won a medal at every Olympic Games at which the event has been competed until her 4th-place finish in the 2012 London Olympics. She was selected as Canada's flag bearer for the closing ceremonies of the Beijing 2008 Olympics.

Following the 2008 Olympic Games, Cockburn did not compete again until the 2009 Canadian National Championships in Hamilton, Ontario. She came in second place after Rosannagh MacLennan. In the synchronised competition, she paired with MacLennan but they did not complete one routine and came in second place. She regained the Canadian National Championship in 2010 at Kamloops, British Columbia with MacLennan coming in 2nd place.

In the 2009 Trampoline World Championships in St Petersburg, Russia, Cockburn won the Bronze medal in Individual trampoline in her first international competition since the Beijing Olympics. She also won a silver medal in Synchronised Trampoline with her usual partner Rosannagh Maclennan.

In 2011, Cockburn did not compete in the Canadian National Championships and was sick for the Finals of the 2011 Pan American Games. In the 2011 Trampoline World Championships in Birmingham, England, Cockburn and MacLennan secured two places for Canadian women in the 2012 Summer Olympics and Cockburn won a Silver medal for the synchronised trampoline event (with MacLennan) and a Bronze medal for the Team competition. In 2012, Cockburn finished in 4th place in the 2012 Summer Olympics's individual trampoline.

In 2014, Cockburn resumed training after giving birth to a daughter in 2013. She is attempting to qualify for the 2015 Pan-American Games to be held in Toronto. She stated that she wanted to compete in a major international event before her hometown crowd before she retired. She competed in the 2014 Canadian National Champuionships in Ottawa and was third. While training at the Trampoline World Championships in Daytona Beach, Florida, in November 2014, she landed badly and broke her ankle forcing her to withdraw from the competition.

Cockburn received the honour of being selected to pronounce the athletes' oath in front of her home crowd in Toronto during the opening ceremonies of the 2015 Pan-American Games. Competing at these games, she placed third in the women's individual trampolining event. On July 16, 2017, at the 2017 Canadian National Trampoline and Tumbling Championships, Karen Cockburn officially retired at a ceremony held to honour her contribution to the sport.

As of 2019 she was the National Team Director for Trampoline Gymnastics at Gymnastics Canada.

== Personal life ==
Cockburn was married to her fellow-Olympian and former training partner Mathieu Turgeon on December 22, 2007. In September 2013, she gave birth to a daughter.

Her autobiography, called Karen Cockburn: Soaring High, was published in November 2007.
