= Pacific Rim Championships =

Gymnastics competition

The Pacific Rim Championships is a major regional biennial gymnastics competition. It is open to teams from member nations of the Pacific Alliance of National Gymnastics Federations, namely Australia, Canada, Chile, China, Chinese Taipei, Colombia, Costa Rica, El Salvador, Hong Kong, Indonesia, Japan, Macau, Malaysia, Mexico, New Zealand, Panama, Peru, Philippines, Russia, Singapore, South Korea, Thailand and the United States. Before 2008, the event was known as the Pacific Alliance Championships.

== Locations of Pacific Rim Championships ==
#	Year	Host city	Country	Date	Ref.
1	1982	Canberra	Australia	September 20, 1982	
2	1984	Reno	United States	December 2–9, 1984	
3	1986	Macau	(Portugal) Macau	September 12–14, 1986	
4	1988	Chengdu	China		
5	1990	Manila	Philippines		
6	1992	Seoul	South Korea		
7	1994	Auckland	New Zealand		
8	1996	Kuala Lumpur	Malaysia		
9	1998	Winnipeg	Canada	July 9–12, 1998	
10	2000	Christchurch	New Zealand	April 13–15, 2000	
11	2002	Vancouver	Canada	May 3–5, 2002	
12	2004	Honolulu	United States	April 15–17, 2004	
13	2006	Honolulu	United States	April 13–15, 2006	
14	2008	San Jose	United States	March 28–30, 2008	
15	2010	Melbourne	Australia	April 27–May 2, 2010	
16	2012	Everett, Washington	United States	March 16–18, 2012	
17	2014	Richmond, B.C.	Canada	April 9–12, 2014	
18	2016	Everett	United States	April 8–10, 2016	
19	2018	Medellín	Colombia	April 27–29, 2018	
—N/a	~~2020~~	~~Tauranga~~	~~New Zealand~~	~~April 17-19, 2020~~	
20	2024	Cali	Colombia	April 21–28, 2024	

== See also ==
- Pacific Rim
